= Jean de Laforcade, Seigneur de La Fitte-Juson =

Jean de Laforcade, Seigneur de La Fitte-Juson, aka Jean de Laforcade, Seigneur de La Fitte-Suzon (sic), aka Jean de La Forcade, aka Jean de La Fourcade, aka Jean de la Fourcade, aka Jean de Lafourcade, aka Jean de Laforcade, aka Jean de Fourcade (* About 1555, presumably in Auvillar; † about 1639, in hamlet of Montclaris, in Sigalens, Gascony), was the son of Protestant nobleman Jean de Laforcade, Seigneur de La Fitte, and a descendant of the noble family of Forcade of Béarn in Navarre.

Attorney General of the Chancery of Navarre (1589–1594), Counsellor on the Conseil Souverain of Navarre and Béarn (1594–1609), Counsellor at the Criminal Court of Béarn ("Conseiller à la Chambre criminelle") (1595), Attorney in charge of Impounds ("Maître de Fourrière") for Catherine de Navarre (1596-1599), Attorney in charge of Petitions ("Maître des requêtes") (1599-1606), Judge in the Seneschalty of Sauveterre (1606–?), a Senior Diplomat for Marie de' Medici, queen mother and Regent of France (1611–1615), and the King's Prosecutor in Oloron (1619).

At least one highly-reputed 19th century genealogist, Gabriel O'Gilvy, referred to him as "…one of the most important men in Béarn…". He is cited several times as "Jean de La Fourcade" in the "Mémoires authentiques de Jacques-Nompar de Caumont, duc de La Force, Maréchal de France", Baron, Governor of Navarre and Béarn (16 March 1593-1621), Viceroy of Navarre, Captain of the Guard Corps, Lieutenant to the King in Béarn, Marquis (1609), Marshall of France (1622), then 1st "duc de La Force, Peer of France" (1637), Seigneur de Castelnaud. He is also named several times in letters between the Queen Mother of Navarre and this latter.

== Life and occupation ==
Jean de Laforcade was a lawyer by occupation. His career reflected both his own, and his family's, close relationship to Antoine of Navarre and to his wife and later widow, Jeanne d'Albret of Navarre, to Henry IV of France, and, following his assassination in 1610, to his widow, Marie de' Medici in her capacity as the queen mother of Louis XIII and de facto Regent of France from 1610–16. Medici was imprisoned by her son Louis XIII in 1617, who then banished her from France and executed many of her closest allies, at which time Jean de Laforcade's career followed a similar negative direction.

Chronology:

- The earliest known citation of Jean de Laforcade is in 1576, with the recording of a donation of 250 Bordeaux francs at the notary Arnaud-Guilhem Du Torner in Pau, made by Jean Secondat, Seigneur de Roques, President of the Chambre des Comptes of Navarre in Nérac, to Jean de Lafourcade, his godson, a student at the Royal Academy of Lescar.
- Appointed Attorney General of the Chancery of Navarre in Pau on 26 April 1589 and resigned on 10 May 1594. In 1594, the Estates of Béarn request of Mr. de Bénac, Lieutenant General, the revocation of the appointment of Jean de Laforcade, appointed as Attorney General of Navarre, because he did not understand Basque.
- 1590, payment of an allowance of 100 livres to Jean de Lafourcade, Attorney General of Navarre, to purchase a red robe.
- In 1593, a first notarized testament of Jean de Laforcade, Attorney in charge of Impounds ("Maître de Fourrière") for Catherine de Navarre, at the Notary Guilhamy de Labat in Pau.
- 1595, appointed Counsellor at the Criminal Court of Béarn ("Conseiller à la Chambre criminelle").
- In 1596, a second notarized testament of Jean de Laforcade, Attorney in charge of Impounds ("Maître de Fourrière") for Catherine de Navarre, at the Notary Pérarnaud de Camps in Pau.
- About 1598–99, the sale of tithes by Jean Du Pac, Seigneur de Bizanos, to Jean de Laforcade, Seigneur de Lafitte, Attorney in charge of Petitions ("Maître des requêtes").
- About 1599, the marriage by notarized contract in Pau between Samuel Du Jac, Minister in Anoye, and Judith de Laforcade, daughter of Jean de Laforcade, Attorney in charge of Impounds ("Maître de Fourrière") for Catherine de Navarre.
- The marriage by notarized contract at the Notary Ramon de Majourau in Pau, between Jean de Minvielle, lawyer, and Marie de Laforcade, daughter of Jean de Laforcade, Attorney in charge of Petitions ("Maître des requêtes"), between 1605 and 1606.
- Counsellor on the Conseil Souverain of Navarre and Béarn (1594-1609), resigning on 11 January 1606 in favor of his son-in-law Jean de Minvielle from Oloron, with "lettres de surannation" dated 9 July 1607 granting an extension to further exercise his position for two further years. Jean de Minvielle was received on the Conseil Souverain of Navarre and Béarn on 3 December 1607.
- Judge in the newly-erected Seneschalty of Sauveterre in 1606.

Baron Jacques-Nompar de Caumont wrote in his letter from Fontainebleau dated 30 November 1606 to his wife, Charlotte de Gontaut-Biron:

"…I am glad for that which the arrival of Mr. de la Fourcade announces for me, he
will assist me in many things, because he has not yet been touched by any of the
affairs of Béarn; in such a manner that you feel that I would be very distant from
power from here, before breaking camp [in Fontainebleau], at least the way I see it…"

And again in his letter from Paris dated 21 December 1606 to his wife:

"…The last news I have of you was sent by Mr. de la Fourcade, written from
Cugnac; I long to learn of the joyous birth of our daughter in Castelnaud.
I do not think I can leave here sooner than around the fifteenth of January,
because it will take me fifteen days, after breaking camp, to wrap up my business…"

- In 1607, he is cited in his capacity of Counsellor on the Conseil Souverain of Navarre and Béarn as providing the position of professor of Hebrew at the Royal College ("College Royal") in Lescar, to Bernard de Majendie, who was appointed and elected by the said university on 12 August 1607 to replace Gratien de St.-Goadens who had died. Subsequently, the Royal College ("College Royal") was transferred back from Lescar to Orthez, where it previously been prior to 1592, with letters of confirmation from the King dated 7 December 1607.
- As an elder of the church in Saint-Palais, he was one of the three deputies elected by the Reformed Church of Béarn to represent the États de Béarn at the General Assembly of the Reformed Church of France in Saumur, together with Pierre de Gontaut-Biron, Baron d'Arros, and Gaillard du Casse, Pastor of Salies-de-Béarn in 1611.

Marie de' Medici, queen mother of Louis XIII, in her capacity as the Regent of France, expressed her annoyance concerning the election of the Deputies for Béarn to the Assembly of Saumur in a letter dated 18 May 1611 to the Marquis de La Force:

"…Pending this, I will not conceal that I found very bad the deputation made by those
of the Religion alleged reformed of Béarn of Messrs. the Baron d'Arros, de Fourcade
and du Casse, that they, for their part, find themselves at the Assembly of Saumur,
notwithstanding the opinion [I have] of their persons, which I consider as was
told to me, and they will conduct themselves there as the righteous ones at the
entertainment of the State in which they have their fortunes and their families; but
as the consequence, having never done this during the life of my lord the late King
and not having had any reason since his death, as you all too well know, and the
good treatment they received from the King, my son and I; how shall we continue
should they give us reason. What you will make them understand, and that which they
will need to properly demonstrate by their actions and behavior in the said Assembly,
should give me complete satisfaction, which I dare to promise should they behave
according to your instructions, on the assurance I have that you will give so
instruct them, as well as to others who find themselves at the said Assembly, as
your loyalty and affection to service to the King, my said Sire and son, and to the
State, makes me hope of you. And this I pray to God, etc. Written in Paris, the 18th
day of May 1611. [Signed:] Marie. [And a little lower:] de Loménie."

In a letter written by the now Marquis Jacques-Nompar de Caumont, from Saumur, to de Loménie, Secretary of State for Navarre dated 30 June 1611:

"Sir, you will see from what I write to the Queen, and to the Messieurs of the
Chancery of Navarre, the reason for hurry, that you will well be able to judge by
the state of affairs such that things do not remain as they are. There is a letter
from Mr. de Saulguis, Counsellor, to Mr. de La Fourcade, that orders him, that the
Viscount d'Échaux and all of the country arm themselves with anything they can,
having great apprehension to receive an unwelcome arrival. I beg you hold the
matter in your hands such that it be reviewed according to the importance of the
facts, and I should be particularly well-informed concerning the wishes of His
Majesty (sic) and what I would have to do…"

From Jacques-Nompar de Caumont, Duke de La Force's memoirs, Jean de La Fourcade's pivotal role at the center of the disputes between the Catholic and Reformed churches in Pau, is illustrated. In an excerpt from these memoirs, he describes how, upon returning to Béarn near the end of 1611, he found that each side was fanning the fires to warm up their courage, Catholics to Catholics, and Protestants to Protestants. The Catholics were "…persuading Catholics that those of the Reformed Religion wanted to step on their throats and have at them at the first opportunity offered…". Those of the Reformed Religion "…persuading those of the Reformed Religion that the Catholics had the same desire, that their destruction was assured, and that the Council of their Majesties had nothing in terms of recommendations except to get rid of them…". The Protestants felt "…they could fairly judge from the little account that had been taken of their demands, and by the fact that everything that had been granted to them was turned against them to their disadvantage and to the advantage of the Catholics, such as, the entry of the Bishops to the Conseil [Souverain de Béarn], the Mass held in the city of Pau against the content of the Edict of Nantes, and the general refusal of all their demands, be it the puny wage increase of thirty livres per year that each of their ministers might receive, or be it the gratuities the three deputies, Messieurs d'Arros, de La Fourcade and du Casse, were granted by His Majesty, whose pensions were the only wages for the little care and vigor they gave to the affairs of their temples, considering these special advantages a public shame…".

- In his capacity as Counsellor to the King on his Conseil de Navarre (conseiller du roi en son Conseil de Navarre), he was appointed by the Queen Mother as one of the three commissioners to Spain to conclude a peace treaty following the fighting in the Aldudes mountain in Lower Navarre in the autumn of 1612, together with Bertrand d'Échaux, Bishop of Bayonne and brother of the Viscount d'Échaux, Seigneur de Baigorry, and Jean d'Esquille, sieur de Lannevielle, Attorney General of the Chancery of Navarre in Saint-Palais.
- After France and Spain reached an agreement on 21 November 1614, he was again selected by France on 13 May 1615 to be one of their five representatives for the implementation of the agreement.
- On 16 July 1613, an auction by Isaac de Lechimia, Jurat of Pau, of a house and furniture belonging to Jean de Laforcade, an inhabitant of Pau, to the benefit of Raymond de Vinsan, Captain in Nay.

Marquis Jacques-Nompar de Caumont furnishes a few details in his memoirs concerning this affair, confirming that during 1615, Jean de La Fourcade was with him in Saint-Palais. In a letter addressed to his wife, on the subject of the state of affairs in Navarre, written from Saint-Palais on 13 July 1615, he wrote:

"It is by the means of Mr. de La Fourcade, who dispatched a man to Pau; and so that
you can see that we are all good husbands, he will bring you news about us. I still
cannot send you news of the Estates, because we are still at the beginning; but I am
given hope that news will not be long. As concerns our neighbors, the cattle they
stole were returned in exchange for a bail. I have not yet seen the Viscount d'Échaux;
he was feeling worse, as I learned there that those from Upper Navarre want to
affirm the rights they claim, so what we must do will depend on the King's wishes.

He again names Jean de La Fourcade in a letter to Mr. de Loménie written from Pau in November 1615:

"…I will tell you the pain I foresee; it is up to you, Sir, who can see more
clearly there, to apply the remedies that I so very humbly beg of you, as is
also the case in the matter of the Aldude, on which subject I received two
letters from the Viscount d'Échaux et de la vallée de Baigorry, that I send
you, where you will see the lamentations of these poor people, who are dying
of poverty this year, their corn having been frozen and their millets burned.
I hear that Mr. de Bayonne quickly dispatches, waiting for the Sieur de La
Fourcade to follow, who he feels must make the trip, since they have broken
their treaty with the Commissioners of Spain, who with their proposals, only
provisionally did not want to give the people of Baigorry either rights or
usage in Aldude…"

Wage payment records at the Chambre des Comptes of Navarre show compensation paid for 1615 to de Laforcade, Counsellor d'État de Navarre.

He was stripped of his nobility by the King before 12 May 1616, probably shortly before 16 July 1613, allegedly for the dérogeance of acquiring some farms in the Pays de Marsan, in present-day department of Landes.

Charlotte de Gontaut-Biron, who a few years later would become the Marshal and Duchess de La Force, finally names Jean de La Fourcade in one of her letters, from Pau, dated 12 May 1616, and addressed to the Marquis de La Force, her husband. This letter is of particular significance in that it speaks of Jean de La Fourcade loss of nobility.

"Sir, we learned by way of letters from Bordeaux that peace was published in Blois,
that the Chancellor was dismissed, his office given to Mr. du Vair, First President
of the Parliament of Provence, who was sent to exercise the office; God grant it
may be to his glory, the pleasure of the righteous and to the benefit of the State!
Mr. de La Fourcade also sends the same wishes to you, Sir, and added his request to
restore him and his family in all their charges, honors, dignities and pensions, and
that the rest of his affairs are going well enough. I do not know if this news will
change your opinion for your return, and if it will not hasten it. Mr. d'Espalungue
received letters from Holland that summon him that this War of the Jülich Succession
restarts, and that one of the Archdukes, whose name I did not retain, makes grand
preparations and armaments to lay siege to that place there…"

- In 1619, he was the King's Prosecutor in Oloron.
- Jean de Laforcade participated in the meeting of the Estates of Béarn, presided over by King Louis XIII on 19 October 1620, as evidenced by a document written by a member of Parliament. An excerpt, translated into English, reads:

"Opening of the Estates of Béarn, performed by the King, during which
he was given 16000 petits écus.

After the dinner on Monday, the 19th of the month of October, we left the Council
toward one o'clock in the afternoon, Messieurs de Casans, President, Laforcade,
Du Pont, Loyard, Dufour, Laugar, Gillot, Lendressc, Marca, Claverie, all three of
the King's staff, and I, in a red robe, to participate in the opening of the
Estates, that took place in the great lower hall of the castle, where a small
stage or theater was set up, on which there was a chair, on which the King sat…"

Jean de Laforcade apparently returned in later life to spend the last years of his life near his sons in parish of Saint-Martin de Monclaris, in the house he built, Caubeyran Manor. Jean de Forcade is named in a limited number of notarial acts in the first half of the 17th century with the simple qualifications of merchant, farmer and inhabitant of the parish of Saint-Martin de Monclaris in the diocese of Bazas. Jean de Forcade obtained letters from the Bishop of Bazas authorizing him burial rights in the parish church itself, in the commune of Sigalens, on 20 June 1639.

The Caubeyran Manor ("Seigneurie de Caubeyran") is located in the hamlet of Montclaris, in Sigalens. According to records, it was built "…during the reign of Henry IV of France…", which began in 1589, by a Captain Jean de Forcade, who was married to the daughter of the Seigneur de Barbuscan, Jehan de Lucmajour, and completed about 1598. Louis de Forcade, his grandson, son of Jean de Forcade, Seigneur de Saint-Genest, Squire, and Noble Marie de Laurière, Damoiselle de Moncaut, is cited as Seigneur de Caubeyran at his marriage in 1653. According to records, Forcade descendants still owned the property in 1828.

Although he did not live to see it, his sons and their descendants were restored to their nobility with letters of rehabilitation issued by King Louis XIV on 11 July 1651 or 13 June 1655, that reestablished them "…in their ancient nobility…" and "…forgave them of the dérogeance committed by their father…". Only one of his sons lived to see the registration in a judgment by the Court of Aids (the Court of Appeals) of Guyenne in Libourne on 27 March 1656 or 27 May 1656, but the descendants of at least two of his sons further continued the noble descendance.

Gabriel O'Gilvy put forth that he was the son of Gaston de Forcade, who was born about 1480 in Orthez. Chaix d'Est-Ange and other authors, however, cast serious doubts on this claim, mainly because O'Gilvy did not provide any source citations to support his claim, and because of, what they considered as, an unforgivable age difference of about 75 years between the two births. Chaix d'Est-Ange felt that one or more generations were missing in between. Recent 21st century research confirms that two generations were, in fact, missing. And, there is new evidence to indicate that these missing generations descended instead from Raymond de Forcade, Gaston's youngest brother.

== Family ==
=== Parents ===
Jean de Laforcade was the son and heir of Protestant Noble Jean de Laforcade, Seigneur de La Fitte, aka Jean de Forcade (* Before 1525; † December 1589 in Pau), General Treasurer of the King and Queen of Navarre in their County of Armagnac (Trésorier général pour les roi et reine de Navarre en leur comté d'Armagnac) in 1556–57, General Treasurer of Navarre (Trésorier général de Navarre) in 1580, Counsellor to the King on his Conseil ordinaire (Conseil d'État), President of Finances (Président aux Comptes) in 1586, First President of the Chambre des Comptes of Navarre at the Parliament of Navarre in Pau on 14 September 1589.

He married by notarized contract with Odette de Rey at Maître Ouzannet, notary and secretary of the commune of Laplume, Gascony, on 29 April 1554. In this marriage contract, he is qualified as both a Noble and a Squire. Odette de Rey, was the sister of Noble Jacques de Rey, Seigneur de La Salle, who was a captain and the military commandant of the village of Laplume.

=== Marriage ===
Records related to the noble manor of Caubeyran in the hamlet of Montclaris, in Sigalens show that the mansion was originally built during the reign of Henry IV of France, and completed before 1598, by a Captain Jean de Laforcade, who married a daughter of the Seigneur de Barbuscan after 1576, at the time Jehan de Lucmajour. The two families were members of court of the Albret family, the rulers of Lower Navarre. The Seigneurie de Barbuscan bears an uncanny resemblance in name to the Château de Barbazan, of which the Captain Desliges was appointed Captain (Governor) on 16 February 1571 at the Chambre des Comptes of Navarre in Pau.

=== Children ===
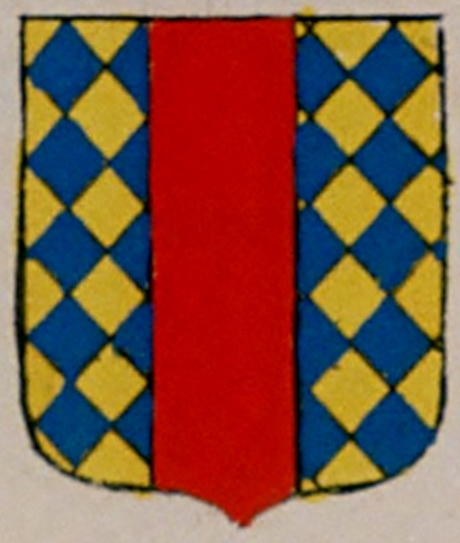
Coat of Arms: de Forcade, Counsellor and King's prosecutor in Oloron, circa 1697

He had at least four sons and two daughters:

- Pierre de Laforcade, aka Pierre de Forcade (* before 1578, presumably in Auvillar, † after 1656), Lawyer, Lawyer at the Parliament of Navarre, Jurat in Pau (1626), and Director of the Mint in Pau (Garde en la monnaie de Pau) (1622–56) and Head of the Mints of Navarre (Général des Monnaies de Navarre) (1634). He married with Marie de Maserolles before 1601, then again with Jeanne de Pargade before 1627.
- Jean de Forcade, Seigneur de Saint-Genest († Before 1656). Together, he and his son are the founders of the branch of the sieurs de Saint-Genest and the sieurs de Caubreyan.
- Étienne I. de Forcade († After 1656). Together, he and his sons are the founders of the branch of the sieurs de La Grézère and the sieurs de La Roquette.
- An unnamed son who carried on both the family name and the responsibilities of being the King's Prosecutor (Procureur du roi) in Oloron, as evidenced by the coat of arms registered in the Armorial de Béarn in 1697.
- Marie de Laforcade († Before 19 January 1609) who married Noble Jean de Minvielle, Seigneur du Domecq de Dognen, between 1605 and 1606.
- Judith de Laforcade, who married Samuel Du Jac, Minister in Anoye, in 1599.

=== Son-in-Law ===
Jean de Minvielle, cited as his son-in-law in 1606, is cited as Noble Jean de Minvielle, Seigneur du Domecq de Dognen, who, on 19 January 1609 furnished a notarized receipt to Noble Jehan du Peyrer, sieur de Tres Villes, his father-in-law, given as dowry for his wife, Marie du Peyrer, in her first marriage. Jean de Minvielle, Seigneur du Domecq de Dognen made his testament on 20 November 1617 and Marie du Peyrer married a second time with Abraham de Brosser, Bourgeois and merchant in Orthez. Damoiselle Marie d'Aramitz is named as "…widow of the late Jehan de Peyré, Seigneur of the noble house of Lisabe and Casamayeur by conquest, and the aforesaid d'Aramitz, gives usufruct of the aforesaid house of Lisabe and Casamayeur in Toisvilles…", in an act dated 28 November 1613. Damoiselle Marie d'Aramitz and Dame of the noble house of Troisvilles, signed an act marie daramits at the royal notary in Soule on 1 October 1628.

At the marriage of Pierre II. de Day, Co-Director of the Mint of in Pau ("contre-garde en la Monnaie de Pau"), with Damoiselle de Anne de Basson, aka Anne de Saint-Martin, by notarized contract at the Notary Jean de Souberbie in Pau on 8 December 1619, the bridegroom was assisted by Maître Pierre I. de Day, also Co-Director of the Mint of in Pau ("contre-garde en la Monnaie de Pau"), his father, Roger de Day and Jean de Day, his brothers, and Jean de La Forcade and Jean de Minvielle, Counsellors to the King, his allies by marriage. The bride was assisted by Damoiselle Agnès de Saint-Martin, also known as Agnès de Bassot, her sister, a resident of Pau, Maître Guillaume Salinis, husband of the aforesaid Saint-Martin, her brother-in-law, Hierosme Norman, General Clerk of the Finances of the King ("commis-général des finance du roi"), her uncle, Maître Isaac de Lostau, Damoiselle Agnès de Normans, widow of the sieur de Lacoste, Counsellor to the King, and Catherine de Camo. Pierre I. de Day, the father, had been provided with the office of Director of the Mint in Morlaàs ("garde de la Monnaie de Morlaàs") on 5 March 1598, following the resignation of Maître Denis Bergeron, aka Denis Vergeron, by Jacques de Caumont, Seigneur and Baron de la Force, Counsellor to the King on his Conseil Souverain of Navarre and Béarn and Conseil Privé, Captain of one of the Corps of the King's bodyguards, Governor and Lieutenant General representing the King in Navarre and the souverain lands of Béarn.

The noble houses of Casamayor and of Elissabé were originally sold on 1 May 1584 by Bernard d'Échauz to Isabelle de Sauguis, widow of noble Jean d'Abbadie d'Izeste, Captain, aunt of Marie d'Aramitz, for 9,000 Bordeaux francs at the Royal Notary de Sanz de Conget in Soule, and this sum was reimbursed by the Seigneur Jean du Peyrer, Bourgeois and merchant from Tardets, to noble Jean d'Abbadie, proxy of Damoiselle Isabelle de Sauguis, his mother, on 25 January 1608.

=== Other Family ===
Circumstantial evidence points to other close family members and descendants. Due to incomplete or missing protestant church records, the exact relationship is not known.

- Jean de Forcade, Seigneur de Sauroux († After 1656), Squire, in or near the town of Sauveterre, is named and cited as a first cousin of the petitioners in article eight of the 1656 judgment by the Court of Aids of Guyenne that restored his sons Jean de Forcade, Seigneur de Saint-Genest and Étienne I. de Forcade, and their descendants, to their ancient nobility. He is the son of an unnamed brother of Jean de Laforcade, Seigneur de La Fitte-Suzon. This article of the judgment, translated into English, reads:

"…Eighth, they have produced an investigation conducted in the town
of Sauveterre in Béarn, by the authority of the elected officials of
Guyenne, at the request of Jean de Forcade, Squire, Seigneur de
Sauroux, first cousin of the petitioners, by which it is amply
verified that their ancestors were genuine nobles, and as such have
always held rank at the [Order of the Nobility of the] Estates of
the land of Béarn…"

- Noble Jacques de La Fourcade assisted his first cousin, Damoiselle Isabelle de Médevielle (sic) from Pon, daughter of Noble Jean de Médevielle (sic) and Damoiselle Marie de Souberie, at her marriage by notarized contract at the notary Jean de Bareilhes in Ossau on 8 January 1602, to the widower, Jean de Rague-Labadie, seigneur d'Espalungue and the abbayes of Laruns.
- Abraham de Laforcade in Saint-Gladie, provided declaration of his assets there to the Chambre des Comptes of Navarre in Pau on 21 November 1674. On the same day, Jean de Minvielle aka Labonnie from Saint-Gladie, provided a declaration for a piece of land called Lacoutre situated in Saint-Gladie to the Chambre des Comptes of Navarre in Pau on 21 November 1674.
- Noble Étienne de Forcade, seigneur de Chantine, the son of Noble Daniel de Forcade, seigneur de Chantine, a lawyer in Orthez, and his wife Damoiselle Barthélémie de Bonnecaze, baptized 8 February 1643 at the Protestant Temple in Orthez, married with Marie de Majendie in the Protestant Temple in Baigts on 20 January 1669, She was the daughter of Pierre de Majendie, Doctor of Medicine in Orthez, and his wife Magdelena de La Borde; the granddaughter of the Bernard de Majendie who was appointed as Professor of Hebrew at the Royal Academy of Lescar, subsequently transferred to Orthez, by Jean de Laforcade in 1607.
- Catherine de Forcade de Dognen (from Dognen), who was the second wife of Pierre Chassevant, a Captain in Navarrenx, who notarized his testament on 3 March 1582. This latter's name bears a strikingly close resemblance to another Captain in Navarrenx at the same time, Assibat de Badie, aka Assibat de Casanab, Seigneur d'Espalungue, aka the Captain Casabant, who married with Catherine de Bescat, aka Catherine d'Espalunge by notarized contract on 9 August 1562.
- David de Forcade, Seigneur du Domec de Dognen, owner of a noble property in Dognen, in the Seneschalty of Oloron who married with Jeanne de Portau on 19 April 1635. Jaurgain puts forth his claim with proof that she was the younger sister of Isaac de Portau aka "Porthos", one of the legendary three mousquetaires, and d'Artagnon's best friend, both children of Isaac de Portau from his second marriage to Anne d'Arrac. The house was destroyed and is no longer standing today.
