= Jean de Laforcade, Seigneur de La Fitte =

Jean de Laforcade, Seigneur de La Fitte, a.k.a. Jean Laforcade, Seigneur de Lafitte, a.k.a. Jean Lafourcade, a.k.a. Jean II. de Forcade (before 1525 in Béarn – about December 1589 in Béarn, presumably in Pau), was a Protestant nobleman and a descendant of the noble family of Forcade of Béarn in Navarre.

He, like his ancestors and his descendants, was a member of court of the Albret family, the rulers of Lower Navarre. A soldier in early life, then a financial officer by occupation later, he was General Treasurer of the King and Queen of Navarre in their County of Armagnac (Trésorier général pour les roi et reine de Navarre en leur comté d'Armagnac), General Treasurer of Navarre (Trésorier général de Navarre), Counsellor to Antoine of Navarre on his Conseil ordinaire, Counsellor to Henry III of Navarre on his Conseil privé, President of Finance (Président aux Comptes), President of the Chambre des Comptes of Navarre in Pau then First President of the Chambre des Comptes of Navarre in Pau. Although he is referred to as a lawyer in at least one source, this is questionable due to his apparent illiteracy.

Jean de Laforcade, Seigneur de La Fitte notarized his testament at Maître Ouzannet, Notary and Secretary of the commune of Laplume on 7 September 1571. Why this testament was made in September 1571, many years before his actual death about December 1589 is a matter of speculation, but one plausible explanation is the unrest and fighting in Auvillar in 1571-72, where he had been Captain of the Château d'Auvillar, perhaps also the Governor of the Château d'Auvillar, appointed by letters patent from Jeanne d'Albret, Queen regnant of Navarre. A brief look at the history of Auvillar highlights the unrest and fighting in this period.

Shortly before 8 January 1590, the sieur de Laforcade died during his term in office as First President of the Chambre des Comptes of Navarre (Premier président en la Chambre).

== Brief History of Auvillar ==
Jean de Laforcade, Seigneur de La Fitte spent much of the period of 1555-72, and perhaps longer, in Auvillar, in various roles in the treasury and as Governor of the Château d'Auvillar, a territory of the Albret family since 1527. As such, he was a central figure in the strife between Protestant and Catholics in the territory.

Marguerite of Angoulême, a.k.a. Marguerite d'Orléans, married 9 October 1509 with Charles IV, Duke of Alençon, Count of Armagnac and, in June 1515, Viscount of Auvillar. He died in 1525 without descendance and she remarried with Henry d'Albret, King of Navarre in 1527 who therewith also became Viscount of Auvillar. He was succeeded by his daughter, Jeanne d'Albret in 1555 through her marriage to Antoine de Bourbon. The Protestants retained possession of Auvillar until June 1571, when the city was retaken by royalist troops. No sooner was Auvillar retaken by royalist troops, than the inhabitants of Auvillar, completely demolished the Viscountal castle to avenge the excesses and abuses of the Huguenots and to retaliate against Henry III of Navarre, their leader. Jeanne d'Albret was succeeded in 1572 as Viscount of Auvillar by her son, Henry III of Navarre, who Henry of Navarre retook Auvillar, where he stayed from 13 to 15 November 1574, but he decided against rebuilding the castle. In 1589 he became Henry IV, King of France.

== Life and Occupation ==
=== Chambre des Comptes in Pau ===
The Chambre des Comptes of Navarre, and more specifically the Chambre des Comptes of Navarre in Pau, is the center of the career of Jean de Laforcade, Seigneur de La Fitte as well as for the next five generations of his direct descendants.

The Chambre des Comptes of Navarre was created by Henry II of Navarre on 4 January 1527, and was reconfirmed and authorized by his successor, Antoine of Navarre, on 11 September 1560, who made at the same time a number of laws to set out the powers of the officers, not only for the Chambre des Comptes of Navarre in Pau, but also for those of Nérac and Vendôme. Among these laws were those that determined the number of officers that each one had to have, namely one President, five Counselors/Auditors, a Registrar, a Huissier and a Patrimonial Prosecutor (a "Procureur Patrimonial"); the jurisdiction and knowledge were set forth for all matters concerning the types of income and expense accounting, and the circumstances and dependencies, all the same, and with the same authority and justice that had belonged to the King himself. By 28 October 1563, the number of huissiers had been increased to two. On 30 September 1569, the Queen Regnant Jeanne published new laws about religion with two main principles: the first being to suspend all officers who were not Huguenot and prohibit the Lieutenant General from enlisting Catholics, and the second being to seize the property and assets, ecclesiastical or layperson, of those who disobeyed her and to sell them on public auction. This latter is, in essence, the beginning of war in Béarn. The number of counselors/auditors was increased to six with the addition of a position of Supernumerary on 28 October 1563, but he was only installed in this office on 3 January 1568.

The Conseil Souverain of Navarre, on which Jean de Laforcade, Seigneur de La Fitte later served as a Counsellor, was created by Henry II of Navarre at the Château de Pau eight years before the Chambre des Comptes of Navarre, on 13 June 1519.

Whereas Protestant church records are very sparse and contain large time gaps, a variety of other sources are available. The most important sources, because of the family's position on the court of the Albret family and his responsibilities later in life, are the registers of the Conseil Souverain of Navarre and the Chambre des Comptes of Navarre in Pau. They shed some light on the life and career of Jean Laforcade, Seigneur de La Fitte, with specific dates and facts.

=== Historical Events in Chronological Order ===
- 29 April 1554, Jean de Forcade is qualified as Noble and as a Squire in his marriage contract with Odette de Rey notarized at Maître Ouzannet, the notary and secretary of the commune of Laplume.
- 1556-57, Maître Jean Lafourcade was appointed General Treasurer of the King and Queen of Navarre in their County of Armagnac (Trésorier général pour les roi et reine de Navarre en leur comté d'Armagnac).
- Between 1555 and 1566, a variety of financial records cite Jean de Lafourcade as Treasurer, in matters concerning the domaines of fr:Fézensaguet and Armagnac, including repairs to the Château d'Auvillar.
- Johan de Forcade is named among many others in a notarized contract of governing the exchange between the House of Lescurre, in Pau, and the Seigneurie of Navailles and d'Angais, made between Arnaud de Colom and Monsignor de Laborde, Secretary and Counsellor to Jeanne d'Albret on 10 November 1565. The contract was made by the Notary Fortaner de Lavie in Nay.
- Jean de Forcade was named Governor of the Château d'Auvillar in Armagnac by letters patent from Jeanne d'Albret, Queen regnant of Navarre.
- 7 September 1571, Jean de Forcade is qualified as Noble and as a Squire in his testament at Maître Ouzannet, the notary and secretary of the commune of Laplume.
- About 1572, act of sale of the Seigneurie de Lafitte in Pau, by Jean de Sabonnières, Seigneur de Juillac, Viguier from Isle-Jourdain, to Jean de Laforcade, Captain of Auvillar.
- 1573, act of sale of the Seigneurie de Lafitte in Pau, by Jean de Laforcade, to Jean de Montgaurin, Counsellor of Béarn, passed at the Coadjutors Pascal de Bonnevigne et Joanolet de Lanos in Monein.
- 1576, payment of wages to de Lafourcade, member of the Conseil privé du roi de Navarre.
- 1580, Jean de Lafourcade, sieur de Lafite, Treasurer, is named in the notarial minutes related to the sales of the forests of Périgord and Limousin.
- 1580, Lafourcade is cited as the General Treasurer of the Royal House of Navarre ("Trésorier général de la maison royale de Navarre") in an original letter from Henry III of Navarre related to his compensation for this role.
- 1579-80, in various payment records. of the Chambre des Comptes of Navarre in 1579, as well as in a letter from King Henri III of Navarre addressed to Jean de Lafourcade in 1580, he is qualified as the General Treasurer of Navarre (Trésorier général de Navarre).
- Jean de Lafourcade is cited as a Member of the Council ("Membre du Conseil") established in Lectoure during the war.
- On 22 July 1581, Jean de la Forcade, sieur de Lafite and Bernard Charon were given a power of attorney by the King of Navarre, to sell as a block or in parcels, the forests of Thiviers, Chalus, Château-Cherveix, etc. to the Sieurs du Teil and Faurichon.
- 1582, award of a pension to Lafourcade, member of the Conseil privé de Navarre.
- 1584, A Jean Laforcade, seigneur de Lafitte, is named as a captain of, or at, the Château d'Auvillar in Armagnac.
- 1584, a written command by the King of Navarre, related to the payment of twenty écu sol made to Jean Lafourcade, sieur de Lafitte, Counsellor, for a second trip to Maignoac, Barousse, Nestes and the Barony of Barbezan and Poeydarieux for a matter concerning the agreement and transaction made with the Viscount of Lavedan, concerning the basis of the usufruct of the lands of Aure, Maignoac, Barousse and Nestes that he owned as property, as well as the rights that he had in the County of Armagnac. - Signed: Henry.
- Before 4 September 1586, the sieur de La Forcade was appointed Counsellor to the King on his Conseil Ordinaire in Pau.
- On 4 or 14 September 1586, the sieur de La Forcade was appointed President of Finance ("Président aux Comptes") in Pau and was installed in this office on 20 October 1586

The preceding appointment as President on the Chambre des Comptes of Navarre (French: "Président aux Comptes"), or more specifically the political infighting surrounding the appointment, reveals that he was either illiterate, or made out to appear as such, by his enemies on the Chambre des Comptes of Navarre, in particular the sieur Odet de Forbet, Procureur Patrimonial. An extract from one register, translated into English, reads:

…On 4 September 1586, the Sieur de La Forcade, counsellor on His Majesty's Conseil Ordinaire, was provided with the position of Président aux Comptes, vacant by the death of Mr. Tisnés, with the aforesaid letters patent signed by Lady Catherine [the King's only sister] as well as by the Sieur de Saint-Geniès, Lieutenant General of the armies of His Majesty. The ratification of these letters patent was opposed by the Procureur Patrimonial, on various pretexts he invented from the start, such as that the oath which should have been taken by the Chambre had been taken by His Majesty, and as such, the address was made to the most senior member instead of being made to the entire body, and, finally, that the required number of officers were not present.. All these excuses exhausted, he finally resorted to the real reasons and represented them as so important, that the Chambre, notwithstanding the fr:Lettre de jussion ("letters patent") obtained by the said Forcade, and without referring to it, he would have to remonstrate with His Majesty to defend against his installation in this office. He argued that by creating the Chambre, His Majesty, at his sole choice, reserved the right to appoint either an illiterate or a graduate to the office of President, but that the importance of this position was such that in the past the responsibility had either been given by commission, or that when it was given as a title of office, those who exercised it were gifted with great knowledge, such as Jacques de Foix, Bishop of Lescar, François de Candale, Louis d'Albret, or the distinguished Bishop d'Aure, all of whom exercised the said office by commission; then, there were those who were simply provided with the title of the office, such as Messire Mathieu Du Pac, Président au Conseil, followed by Maître Bertrand d'Abbadie, Attorney General, followed by Maître Jean de Salettes, then Maître Guilhaume d'Areau and lastly Arnaud de Tisnés, all men of great literature, science and experience, something that we do not find at all in the person of the said de Forcade, who has not the vaguest literacy. Furthermore, he remonstrated the said Chambre that the obligation to have a president who was a graduate was even greater due to the fact that not a single auditor had knowledge of grammar. Lastly, he remonstrated the said Chambre, the importance and excellence of these jobs necessarily required that one function of these offices was that of being scholars of judicial orders. Notwithstanding these and other reasons, fully deducted in front of His Excellency, he again expressed his will and the said de Forcade was installed on 20 October 1586.

- Before 30 October 1587, sieur de Forcade was appointed President of the Chambre des Comptes of Navarre ("President en la Chambre").
- 1 December 1587, the sieur de Lafourcade, sieur de Lafiitte, First President of the Chambre des Comptes of Navarre ("Premier president en la Chambre"), was awarded a pension of 300 livres, a role for which he had only 200 livres of compensation.
- 7 December 1587, the Chambre des Comptes of Navarre verified a pension of 100 écus in favor of Jean Lafourcade, sieur de Lafitte, President of the Chamber, retroactive to the date of his installation in this office.
- 1588, the sale by repurchase agreement of the Seigneurie of the city of Grenade by Jean de Laforcade, Seigneur de Lafitte, from Pau, President of the Chambre des Comptes of Navarre, acting on behalf of the King of Navarre, to Antoine de Béarn, Baron de Doumy et de Bonnegarde; Witnesses: Jean de Salles, Chamberlain of the King of Navarre and Governor of Navarrenx, Fortic and Arnaud de Brassalay, François de Doumy, Seigneur de Sautarisse.
- 26 April 1589, the office of Attorney General of the Chancery of Navarre in Pau was provided to Jean Lafourcade, son of the President aux Comptes.
- Shortly before 8 January 1590, the sieur de Laforcade died during his term in office as First President of the Chambre des Comptes of Navarre (Premier president en la Chambre).
- 1591, award of a bonus of 2,000 écus to de Lafourcade, President of the Chambre des Comptes of Navarre of Pau.
- 27 August 1591, a pension in the amount of 100 écus in gold was established by the Chambre des Comptes of Navarre in favor of the widow of the sieur de La Forcade, Demoiselle Loyse d'Aboval, for the services rendered by her husband.

== Family ==
=== Parents ===
Notable genealogists Gabriel O'Gilvy and Chaix d'Est-Ange both alleged, without citing sources, that he is the son of Noble Gaston de Forcade. They were unable to verify his filiation and the spread of approximate birth years discredits this hypothesis.

Records available in the 21st century imply, without confirming, that he was instead the son of Maréchal Arnaudt de Forcade, who originally received the noble fief of La Fitte as a donation from Jeanne d'Albret in 1571.

=== Marriage ===
Records indicate that Jean de Laforcade, Seigneur de La Fitte may have married at least two times.

Noble Jean de Forcade, Squire, notarized his marriage contract with Odette de Rey at Maître Ouzannet, Notary and secretary of the commune of Laplume on 29 April 1554. Odette de Rey, was the sister of Noble Jacques de Rey, seigneur de La Salle, who was a captain and the military commandant of the village of Laplume.

A pension in the amount of 100 écus in gold was established by the Chambre des Comptes of Navarre in favor of the widow of the sieur de La Forcade, Demoiselle Loyse d'Aboval, for the services rendered by her husband on 27 August 1591.

Louise d'Aboval, widow of Jean de Laforcade, Seigneur de Lafitte, Président des Comptes, notarized her testament about 1595 at the Notary Pérarnaud de Camps in Pau.

=== Children ===
In his 1571 testament, he names three sons and two daughters from his marriage, named in the following order: Pierre, Étienne, Bernard, Antoinette and Marie. At least two of these sons carried on the noble family lines. There were two additional sons who apparently were not named in this testament, Dominique (†1636), who married Agnes Ducosso de Bilheres-Projan, and Jean, who married a de Lucmajour, and who follows.

- The office of Prosecutor and Attorney General of the Chancery of Navarre in Pau was provided to Jean Lafourcade, son of the President of Finance ("Président aux comptes") at the Chambre des Comptes of Navarre in Pau, on 26 April 1589.
- Jean de Forcade, Seigneur de Sauroux († after 1656), Squire, in or near the town of Sauveterre, is named and cited as a first cousin of the petitioners in article eight of the 1656 judgment by the Court of Aids of Guyenne that restored his sons Jean de Forcade, Seigneur de Saint-Genest and Étienne I. de Forcade, and their descendants, to their ancient nobility. As a first cousin, he would be the son of a brother of Jean de Laforcade, Seigneur de La Fitte-Juson, a grandson of Jean de Laforcade, Seigneur de La Fitte. This article of the judgment, translated into English, reads:

…Eighth, they have produced an investigation conducted in the town of Sauveterre in Béarn, by the authority of the elected officials of Guyenne, at the request of Jean de Forcade, Squire, Seigneur de Sauroux [sic], first cousin of the petitioners, by which it is amply verified that their ancestors were genuine nobles, and as such have always held rank at the [Order of the Nobility of the] Estates of Béarn…"

=== Other Family Branches ===
Several noble branches of the Forcade family claim a common descendance from the noble Forcade family of Orthez, where the family is recorded as early as the 12th century.

The vast pool of historical sources available now with search tools in the 21st century, tends to point to Jean de Laforcade, seigneur de La Fitte as the father of several branches of the noble family of Forcade. Circumstantial evidence from 17th century records tends to confirm his parentage of these family branches.

- The branch Forcade de La Grézère, Forcade de La Roquette, Forcade de Caubeyran, Forcade de Saint-Genest and Forcade de Lastranenq was confirmed in several 17th-century judgments to descend from Noble Jean de Laforcade, Seigneur de La Fitte-Juson, who was stripped of his nobility in the early 17th century, allegedly for the dérogeance of having acquired some farms in the Pays de Marsan. He was the son of this Jean de Laforcade, seigneur de La Fitte.
- The branch Forcade de Biaix and a little known, but closely related, branch Forcade de Baure, both also claimed a common descendance from ancestors in Orthez in the late 17th century, however, the authors of early books on the topic of genealogies of noble families are silent about the ancestry of the Forcade-Biaix branch's founder, Noble Jean de Forcade, seigneur de Biaix. These same early books name only one person in the Forcade-Baure branch, Noble Pierre de Forcade, seigneur de Baure. Recent 21st century research, however, proves that Jean de Forcade, Seigneur de Biaix, Fermier des monnaies de Béarn et Navarre (minter of coins for Béarn and Navarre), was the grandson of Pierre de Forcade, Lawyer, Garde des monnaies de Béarn et Navarre de Pau (Guardian of the currency of Béarn and Navarre) at the Parliament of Navarre in Pau. Pierre de Forcade, Seigneur de Baure was Pierre de Forcade's eldest son. The elder Pierre was the grandson of this same Noble Jean de Laforcade, Seigneur de La Fitte-Juson, who was stripped of his nobility in the early 17th century, allegedly for the dérogeance of having acquired some farms in the Pays de Marsan.
- The branch Forcade du Tauzia, Forcade du Pin and Lafourcade de la Prade was confirmed in two 17th-century judgments to descend from the Noble family of Forcade in Orthez. The founder of this branch is identified as this Jean Laforcade, seigneur de Lafitte.
