= Mint of Navarre and Béarn =

The Mint of Navarre and Béarn (French: Monnaie de Navarre et Béarn) was formed through the merger of the Mint of Navarre (French: Monnaie de Navarre) in Saint-Palais, whose construction was originally authorized by Charles the Bad in 1351, and placed under the authority of the Chambre des Comptes of Navarre on 4 January 1527, with the two Mints of Béarn (French: Monnaies de Béarn) in Pau and Morlaàs, in Béarn, in 1562.

== Mints ==
The physical buildings that housed the mints were typically called the "Hôtel de la Monnaie." In some cases they are called the "Château de la Monnaie". In both Morlaàs and Pau, the mints had their origins in the official residences of the Viscount of Béarn in Morlaàs and of the Kings of Navarre in Pau respectively. The tower of the Château de Pau in which the mint was located was called the "Tour de la Monnaie".

A mint itself, in addition to being called by its proper name, such as the Monnaie de Saint-Palais or Monnaie de Pau, is often referred to as a ferme de monnaie and an atelier de la monnaie, or collectively as ateliers monétaires, in older French literature and records. In Béarnese, one sees the name secque (also seque and socques), as well as moneda and monederie, to designate the mint or monetary workshop. The Béarnese secque has the same meaning as zecca in Italian, and is most likely directly derived from the Arabic word sekkah (English: a die used to strike coins), because of the proximity to Spain.

The three mints still functioning as of the 15th century were subcontracted out to third parties who ran them privately under licenses renewable every six years. They minted coins of differing values in the name of, and for the benefit of, the King of Navarre and Béarn, as well as medals and tokens.

Starting on 19 August 1494, the currency had one-to-one exchange rates with coins of the same value minted in the Kingdom of France.

=== Mints of Navarre ===
==== Saint-Palais ====
In Saint-Palais, the former Hôtel de la Monnaie is now called the "Maison des Têtes", located in the Rue du Palais de Justice.

At the time of its creation in 1351, Saint-Palais had a population of about 300 inhabitants, of which 100 worked at the mint (60 workers in the foundry to melt the metal into liquid and 40 striking silver écus bearing the effigies of Navarrese kings Henry III and of Louis II; the last écus struck bore the effigy of Louis III.

In 1386, Saint-Palais was one of four mints in the Kingdom of Navarre, the other three being Saint-Jean-Pied-de-Port, Pamplona and Monreal. At some point after 1402, the mint ceased activity. The Mint of Navarre in Saint-Palais was closed after 1527 for a period, but reopened in 1579. It ceased activity in 1672.

==== Saint-Jean-Pied-de-Port ====
Records show the existence of a mint in Saint-Jean-Pied-de-Port in 1386, one of four in the Kingdom of Navarre. Little else is known about this mint from records in French archives.

=== Mints of Béarn ===
==== Morlaàs ====
Coins, called "sols morlans", that were legal tender in all of Gascony as well as Béarn, were minted in Morlaàs at the Château de la Hourquie (Béarnese: Forcas), the official residence of the Viscount of Béarn, since the 9th century. It was situated on a small plateau south of the Place du Marché. In 1096, in the letters of Pope Urban II, it is written that the church of Sainte-Foi of Morlaàs is situated in the County of Béarn, in a town called Furcas.

In the early years, these were simple coins made from copper and bronze, but Gaston Phoebus later ordered that the mint in Morlaàs strike écus in gold and silver. Coins minted in Morlaàs, engraved with the heraldic cows, the symbols of Béarn, were often referred to as "baquettes" (i.e. little cows).

The reputation of Morlaàs currency was great. For this reason, in 1366 Charles the Bad, King of Navarre, who was seeking to give his florins the perfection of those of Aragon and of Florence, called upon Jean d'Estèbe, who was the head of the Mint of Morlaàs. In 1434, Jean de Foix-Grailly, Viscount of Béarn, appointed Peyroten d'Arblade, from Mont-de-Marsan, as Maître Particulier of the Mint of Morlaàs for two years. To this end, he established the mint in the castle in Morlaàs. The new maître particulier contractually committed to mint "morlaàs blancs", which by definition included deniers, the "medalhes morlanes" (i.e. oboles and mailles), and lastly a coin called pogese which had the value of one-fourth of a denier. The viscount contractually committed to provide four hundred marks of silver, based on Cologne weight (French: poids de Cologne), that Peyroton d'Arblade had to mint during the first year of the contract.

In 1484, Jean de Gardey from the County of Pardiac, was removed from office as the maître of the Mint of Morlaàs on the pretext that he was not Béarnese and that he paid seigneurial duties of less than half of the real value of the mint. When Arnaud d'Abbadie was appointed maître of the Mint of Morlaàs, one sees that the mint was still located in the castle in 1484, because it is written that he will stamp coins in "our castle, house and mint in Morlaàs" (Béarnese: "nostre castet, mayson et monederie de Morlàas".)

Before 1488, Morlaàs had the exclusive privilege of minting coins for Béarn, after which Jean d'Albret, then King of Navarre, Count of Foix and Viscount of Béarn, gave privileges to Pau and new letters patent for Saint-Palais.

Bascle de Lagrèze wrote that the Mint of Morlaàs was closed and that the molds, forges and other equipment were transferred to Pau about 1554, but this appears incorrect, because there is evidence that coins continued to be minted in Morlaàs well into the 1660s, if not later.

In 1562, Auger de Lagarde promised to mint coins in "the monetary workshop and castle of the Mint of Morlàas" (Béarnese: "la secque et castet de la moneda de Morlàas".)

Blanchet suspected that production was suspended at the Mint of Morlaàs was around 1619, due to the lack of evidence of any deliveries or shipments after this date. If production was suspended, it was short-lived, because a written decree dated 6 May 1637, issued on the advice of the officers of the mint, ordered that "baquettes" be produced in the Mint of Morlaàs "...up to a maximum value and quantity of 1,000 livres within a period of two weeks, explicitly requiring the officers, laborers and moneyers of the mint, to give the said "baquettes" in this vintage a distinct form, diameter and roundness so that they could be easily distinguished from counterfeits, and that to further ensure this, Messieurs Dupont, First President of the Chambre des Comptes, de Cachalon, Maître des Comptes, and the Prosecutor General, are required to be present during the new production, unless a bigger production run is otherwise ordered by the Chambre to meet to public needs."

The workshop was apparently closed again for an unknown period of time, because in 1662, the moneyers of Morlaàs presented a request to reopen the workshop for the production of gold and silver coins to the Estates of Béarn. Their request was apparently not granted, because at the Assembly of Nobility of the Estates of Béarn in Nay on 10 September 1663, a new request was made that the Estates intercede with His Majesty, "...to obtain his decree that the Mint of Morlaàs be reopened, at least for the production of pieces of five and ten ardit (one ardit was one-sixth of a sol, meaning 15 and 30 denier coins), that are necessary for usage by the public."

The molds, forges and other equipment of the Mint of Morlaàs were finally transferred to Pau about 1690 and the mint ceased operations, after no less than 600 years of operation. The references that can be found concerning the Mint of Morlaàs in 1690 lead to the conclusion that the workshop was no longer functioning. In the registers of the Mint of Pau, there is mention of the payment of 37 livres for "the days employed to assemble the 'presse de la monoje' from Morlaàs and the one of Pau by Mathieu, Moulat and la Galère, carpenters from Jurançon." In the same register, in an entry dated May 11th of the same year, there is mention of a payment of 3 livres paid "...to the blacksmith of the 'monoje' for his time and the use of his horse to go and load a scale at the 'Monoje de Morlaas' (sic)." It seems evident that if the workshop in Morlaàs still existed, it no longer was functioning and its equipment was being transported to Pau.

After having rented the old Hôtel de la Monnaie of Morlaàs, the land on which it previously stood was sold at the end of the 18th century. The Château de la Hourquie that housed the Hôtel de la Monnaie is said to have been destroyed in 1708.

==== Pau ====
In Pau, a Château de la Monnaie, rebuilt in the 14th century during the reign of Gaston Phoebus, was situated in the "Borc Nau" (French: "le Bourg neuf"), between the Hôtel de la Baque and the Motte de la Couète de la Molère, not far from the Moulin de la Dona. The Hôtel de la Baque evidently took its name from the coins of Morlaàs, engraved with the heraldic cows, the symbols of Béarn, commonly referred to as "baquettes" (i.e. "vachettes") at the time.

A Hôtel de la Monnaie was then constructed in the Tour de la Monnaie of the Château de Pau in 1524. When this became too small, a larger Hôtel de la Monnaie was built in 1554 to the east of, but adjoining, the original Tour de la Monnaie. It served as a mint from 1554 until the French Revolution. The equipment and tools of the mint were transferred to Monnaie de Bayonne during the Revolution, and in 1807 the Tour de la Monnaie, Hôtel de la Monnaie, and all their outbuildings were legally separated from the Château de Pau and sold by the government.

In 1617, the Cours des Monnaies de France demanded that the three mints of Saint-Palais, Pau and Morlaàs be placed under its jurisdiction, but this reform was never carried out. A judgement issued by the Parliament of Bordeaux in 1642, specifically mentions the Parliament of Navarre and Béarn and the Chambre des Comptes of Navarre, but does not mention at all the Cours des Monnaies de France.

Blanchet concluded from the lack of documents he was able to find that the Mint of Pau was closed by 1622, at least for some time.

In 1662, Genisseau incorporated the Mint of Pau into the general contract of the Mint of France by surprise, which provoked objections in Pau, and which were finally ruled as valid.

As of 1763, the Mint of Pau was still not under the authority of the Cour des Monnaies de Paris, the reason for which a majority of coins struck in Béarn under the reigns of Louis XIII of France and Louis XIV of France were a special type.

With article 2 of the Edict of October 1775, the King finally placed all of the responsibilities that the Court of Parliament of Pau had had jurisdiction for under the auspices of the Cour des Monnaies, under the authority of the Cour des Monnaies de Paris.

== Mint Officers ==
Because the mints were under the authority of the Chambre des Comptes of Navarre, the most senior mint official, the Général des Monnaies, was an officer of the Chambre des Comptes of Navarre. Each of the three mints had their own separate and distinct personnel. The mints officers included a Garde de la Monnaie, a Contre-Garde de la Monnaie, a Prosecutor (French: procureur), a Registrar (French: greffier), and later a Huissier.

Within the mints (French: Hôtel de la Monnaie) themselves, the management consisted of the licensee, often referred to as the "lessee" of the mint (French: fermier), who was normally the operational and financial manager (French: directeur & trésorier particulier), an engraver (French: graveur), a quality controller (French: essayeur), a moneyer provost (French: prévôt des monnayeurs), a finisher provost (French: prévôt des ajusteurs), and a moneyer supervisor (French: lieutenant des monnayeurs). The "monnayeurs" were the operators of the equipment and presses needed to mint the coins. The "ajusteurs" took the freshly-minted coins and deburred and otherwise polished them.

After Navarre and Béarn were joined in union with the Kingdom of France in 1620, certain officers exercised general functions for all three mints.

In 1635, King Louis XIII confirmed the letters of succession granted to the officers of the mints of Pau and Morlaàs in 1631. Each officer paid 293 livres and 5 sous for confirmation of their letters, after which the succession of the offices was by inheritance.

In his Monetary History of Béarn, Blanchet provided detailed, albeit incomplete, listings with references from the Departmental Archives of the Payrénées-Atlantiques, of the persons who held the various offices for the three mints in Saint-Palais, Pau and Morlaàs.

=== Général des Monnaies ===
The Général des Monnaies (English: General of the Mint), also known as a Général Provincial (English: Provincial General), was title for the judges established in different provinces of the kingdom to preside over rulings that were issued in jurisdictions under the authority of the Chambre des Comptes of Navarre, before 1691, and by the Cour des Monnaies of the Parliament of Navarre and Béarn, between 1691 and the French Revolution. A ruling of the Conseil d’État dated 1 July 1625 gave them the official title of Conseillers Généraux Provinciaux des Monnaies (English: General Provincial Counselors of the Mints).

They were responsible for the audit and inspection of the mints, and had the gardes, later juges-gardes, reporting directly to them. They were responsible for remitting the minutes of his visits in the form of reports to the Prosecutor General, who, in turn, was responsible for remitting reports to the Court of Parliament. This latter examined the reported abuses committed in the production processes and pronounced punishment on the fermiers/maîtres, officers and laborers of the mints.

In an edict dated 30 June 1696, King Louis XIV replaced the seven Provincial Generals with twenty-eight Conseillers Généraux Provinciaux, of which one was for the city of Pau and under the jurisdiction of the Parliament of Pau. These new counselors, like their counterparts at the Cour de la Monnaie, were responsible for the prevention of counterfeiting and unauthorized alterations of coins, working in parallel with the bailiwicks, seneschals, officers of the Présidial, and the gardes of the mints. The General of the Mint of Navarre and Béarn settled disputes between mint officers, hired skilled and unskilled laborers for the mints, and ruled on objections raised to procedures at, and judgments concerning, the mints, when they arose, except in those cases when they were appealed to the Court of Parliament.

Before 1691, the General of the Mint was hired by, and swore oath to, the Chambre des Comptes of Navarre. After the Chambre des Comptes of Navarre was merged into the Parliament of Navarre and Béarn in 1691, they were hired by, and swore oath to, the Cour des Monnaies of the Parliament of Navarre and Béarn. Their remuneration amounted to 1,333 livres, 6 sols and 8 deniers per year.

The Generals of the Mints of Navarre and Béarn (incomplete)
| Name | Title | Date Appointed | Date Confirmed (Note: by the Chambre des Comptes) | Date Assumed Office | Date Departed Office | Reason | Sources |
|---|---|---|---|---|---|---|---|
| Bernard de Marca | Trésorier de Nébouzan et Général des Monnaies | | | 1543 | 1566 | | |
| Jean de Montgaurin | Général des Monnaies de Béarn | | | 1583 | 1594 | resigned | |
| Jean de Sabaloa | Général de la Monnaie de Navarre | | | 1585 | 1587 | | |
| Jean de La Garde | Général des Monnaies de Béarn | | | 24 Dec 1594 | 1598 | death | |
| Duverger | unknown | | | 1594 | | | |
| Jean de Montgaurin | Général des Monnaies de Béarn | | | 14 Jan 1598 | 1601 | resigned | |
| Isaac de La Garde | Général des Monnaies de Navarre et de Béarn | | | 3 Dec 1601 | 1603 | | |
| Antoine de Bénévent | Général des Monnaies de Navarre | | | 25 Jun 1603 | 1605 | | |
| Lagarde | Général des Monnaies de Béarn | | | 1605 | 1608 | | |
| De Vergès | Général des Monnaies de Navarre et de Béarn | | | 1606 | 1609 | | |
| De Lagarde | Général des Monnaies de Navarre et de Béarn | | | 1608 | | | |
| Josué de Lagarde, Seigneur de Beucaire | Général des Monnaies de Béarn | | | 1619 & 13 Jul 1652 | | | |
| Pierre de Laforcade, aka Pierre de Forcade | Général des Monnaies de Béarn | | | 1626 | 1659 | | |
| Saubat de Vergès | Essayeur et Général | | | 1627 | | | |
| Pierre de Laforcade, aka Pierre de Forcade | Général des Monnaies de Navarre | | | 1634 & 1659 | | | |
| Belloc | Général des Monnaies de Navarre et de Béarn | | | 1664 | | | |
| Belloc | Général des Monnaies de Béarn | | | 1669 | | | |
| Larroque | Général de la Monnaie de Navarre | | | 1669 | | | |
| De Belloc | Général des Monnaies de Béarn | | | 1684 | | | |
| Jacques Munié | Directeur de la monnaie de Pau | | | | † 28 Jul 1709 | | |
| Jean-Pierre de Lacroix | Général des Monnaies | | | 1694 | 1717 | | |
| Jérôme Bourjot | Général des Monnaies | | | 1735 | after 1752 | | |
| David de Matheu | Général Provincial de la Monnaie de Pau | | | 1754 | | | |
| Pouts | Général | | | | 1775 | | |
| Pierre Picard or de Picard | Général Provincial | | | 1775 | 1784 | | |

=== Maître Général ===
On 25 October 1497, Catherine of Navarre named Jean, Seigneur de Candau, Maître Général of the Mint of Morlàas, to replace Gaston de Saint-Jean, who had died. One sees from this document that the Maître Général received the oaths of office from the maîtres particuliers, gardes, essayeurs, prévôts, and skilled and unskilled laborers. But, this title seems to have been purely honorary and other documents show that the management of the mints belonged to the maître particulier who leased the mints and produced coins under license.

The Maîtres Généraux of Morlaàs (incomplete)
| Name | Date Appointed | Date Confirmed | Date Assumed Office | Date Departed Office | Reason | Sources |
|---|---|---|---|---|---|---|
| Gaston de Saint-Jean | | | 1497 | | | |
| Jean, Seigneur de Candau | | | 1497 | | | |

=== Maître Particulier / Fermier ===
The Maître Particulier (English: Individual Master) leased a mint or mints under a renewable six-year contract from the Chambre des Comptes of Navarre, later the Cour des Monnaies of the Parliament of Navarre and Béarn, and produced coins, medals and tokens under the license granted with this lease.

The Maître Particulier is often referred to as the Fermier, a word that has its root and meaning in the fact that the fermier was the individual "…qui affermait la fabrication…" (who leased the production). Fermier, in this sense, means lessee, the one who affermer (present tense) or affermait (past tense). The Chambre des Comptes of Navarre was the lessor of the mints.

At the end of his lease, the lessee was required to present a detailed accounting of the entire production made under his lease, the seigneurial duties paid, the allowances for weight and for law recorded during production, the remuneration of the various mint officers and, in general, all of the expenses incurred. This accounting was subject to a strict verification.

The lease was paid to the Treasurer of Béarn in three installments annually: at Candlemas, Pentecost and Michaelmas.

New mints leases were originally announced by the sounding of trumpets. Later, it was announced throughout the kingdom by posters printed in Lescar.

The Maîtres Particuliers / Fermiers of Morlaàs (incomplete)
| Name | Date Appointed | Date Confirmed | Date Assumed Office | Date Departed Office | Reason | Sources |
|---|---|---|---|---|---|---|
| Peyroton d'Arblade | | | 1434 | 1436 | | |
| Jean de Gardey | | | 1483 | | | |
| Arnaud d'Abaddie, Seigneur de Narp et de Mourenx | | | 1484 | | | |
| Martin de la Doue | | | 1484 | | | |
| Menauton de la Motte | | | 1484 | after 1514 | | |
| Auger de la Garde, aka Ogier de Lagarde (Note: Lagarde was a goldsmith, as one can see from a payment to him in 1581, with ten gold rings adorned with diamonds) | | | 1562 | Sep 1582 | death | |
| Berthomie de la Moulère (Note: Widow of Auger de la Garde) | | | Sep 1582 | Oct 1582 | | |
| Guillaume Lamy | | | Oct 1582 | | | |
| Roger de Vergez | | | 1583 | 1585 | | |
| Guillaume Lamy (Note: Associate of the preceding Roger de Vergez) | | | 1585 | 1587 | | |
| Bertrand de Lande, Seigneur de Gayon (Note: Bourgeois from the city of Bayonne) | | | 1589 | 1590 | | |
| Guillaume Lamy (Note: Associate of the preceding Bertrand de Lande) | | | 1589 | 1590 | | |

=== Directeur ===
Towards the end of the 17th century, the Maître Particulier, a lessee, was replaced with a Director, an employee. The office of Director of the Mint cost 13,200 livres and offered 1,200 livres in remuneration. The office holder was also entitled to a bonus, calculated as 5 sols per marc of gold and silver coins minted.

=== Garde / Juge-Garde ===
The garde (English: guardian) of the mints were responsible for policing the workshops and for preventing the entry of persons other than those who were duly sworn and employed at the mint. Their responsibilities included ensuring the accuracy of weights, being present at pre-production trials, post-production tests and when weights were measured, as well as during the delivery and crating of finished coins. They were required to keep registers of raw materials used in production and of production delays by laborers and moneyers, as well as for giving of the workers the dénéraux, the monetary weights used to check the weight of coins minted, especially those from gold, to facilitate correct coinage. When the planchet were not perfectly round or otherwise not well worked, the garde was responsible to have them remelted and recast at the expense of the employees involved, as well as to inflicted fines or other penalties on them, including the suspension from work. The gardes were also responsible for removing the stamping tools and instruments used in striking coins and medals from the workshop, when they were not being used.

Prior to the end of the 16th century, the Gardes des Monnaies of Béarn were not required to post a bond, but the Prosecutor General complained to Madame la Gouvernante that their responsibility was so important, yet they were not required to post any bond. Henry III of Navarre made a decree on 6 December 1590, ordering that no one could be hired as a garde without posting a bond of 1,000 écu sols.

At the end of the 17th century, there were two juges-gardes in the Mint of Pau of which Parliament disputed their qualities as juges-gardes, given to them by letters patent by the king. Their offices cost 4,000 livres each and offered 125 livres of remuneration. The juges-gardes were also entitled to a bonus, calculated as 1 sols per marc of newly minted gold coins, 6 denier per marc of silver coins, and 6 deniers per marc of gold and silver coins sent back to the foundry to be remelted and minted a second time (as a result of quality issues).

The Gardes of Morlaàs (incomplete)
| Name | Date Appointed | Date Confirmed | Date Assumed Office | Date Departed Office | Reason | Sources |
|---|---|---|---|---|---|---|
| Guillem de Ladoue | | | 1543 | | | |
| François de Loos | | | 1562 | 1566 | | |
| Jacques de la Molère | | | 1574 | | | |
| Jean d'Estillart | | | 1579 | 1579 | resigned | |
| Pierre de Rauzet | | | 1579 | | resigned (Note: in favor of Pierre de Rauzet) | |
| Michel de la Molère | | | 1580 | | | |
| Denis Vergeron | | | 1580 | 1591 | | |
| Pierre de Day | | | 1599 | | | |
| Pierre de Day and Bayard | | | 1604 | | | |
| Denis Vergeron | | | 1611 | | resigned (Note: in favor of his son-in-law, Jacques de Noseilles) | |
| Jacques de Noseilles | | 27 Feb 1617 | 27 Feb 1617 | 1627 | | |
| Laforcade | | | 1634 | | | |
| Jacques de Noseilles | | | 1637 | | | |
| Denis de Nozeilles | | | 1647 | 1656 | | |
| Jean de Forgues | | | 1657 | | | |

=== Contre-Garde / Contrôleur Contre-Garde ===
On 23 November 1606, fr:Maître Pierre de Day was hired as the first contre-garde, and because this office was new, the King fixed the remuneration at 125 livres, in other words, the same as for the gardes at the time. This amount was to be taken out of funds of Chambre des Poids et Alois (English: Chamber of Weights and Values), after the remuneration of the other mint officers and all other expenses were paid. The new contre-garde was required to post a bond.

The contre-garde was an officer responsible for the inspection of the work in the monetary workshop and for keeping a register of the gold, silver and billon metals used in the production of coins. He checked the financial accounts submitted by clerks and exchange dealers, and ensured that they were paid in cash according to the current exchange rate. The contre-garde was ranked organizationally one level lower than the garde or juge-garde, but they replaced each other in their functions in case of absence.

The office of contre-garde cost 8,800 livres, offered 800 livres of remuneration, and entitled the holder to a bonus of 6 deniers per marc of gold and silver brought to the exchange.

With an edict in June 1696, Louis XIV of France replaced the contre-gardes with contrôlers contre-gardes, whose duties remained the same and whose remuneration amounted to 1,066 livres, 13 sols and 4 deniers. The salary was increased by 200 livres in 1700. In addition, each contrôleur contre-garde was allotted housing, inside the mint itself.

The Contre-Gardes of Morlaàs (incomplete)
| Name | Date Appointed | Date Confirmed (Note: by the Chambre des Comptes) | Date Assumed Office | Date Departed Office | Reason | Sources |
|---|---|---|---|---|---|---|
| Pierre de La Garde, aka Pierre de Lagarde | | | 1600 | | | |
| Pierre de Day | | | 23 Nov 1606 | | | |
| Bayard | | | 1619 | | | |
| Jeanne de Faget (Note: widow of Pierre de La Garde) | | | | resigned | | |
| Jean de Forgues | | | 2 Apr 1632 | | | |

The Contrôleurs of Morlaàs (incomplete)
| Name | Date Appointed | Date Confirmed (Note: by the Chambre des Comptes) | Date Assumed Office | Date Departed Office | Reason | Sources |
|---|---|---|---|---|---|---|
| Bertrand de Beaumont | | | 1657 | | | |

The Contrôleurs of Pau (incomplete)
| Name | Date Appointed | Date Confirmed (Note: by the Chambre des Comptes) | Date Assumed Office | Date Departed Office | Reason | Sources |
|---|---|---|---|---|---|---|
| Claude Joseph de Renoir | | | before 1687 | | | |

=== Monnayeur ===
A mint worker responsible for coinage (striking coins.)

There were four monnayeurs that had no fixed compensation. Instead, they earned 1 sol per marc of gold minted, 6 deniers per marc of silver, and 6 deniers per marc of gold or silver remelted and reminted.

The Monnayeurs of Morlaàs (incomplete)
| Name | Date Appointed | Date Confirmed (Note: by the Chambre des Comptes) | Date Assumed Office | Date Departed Office | Reason | Sources |
|---|---|---|---|---|---|---|
| Girard (Note: Cartul. de Morlàas, édition Cadier, p. 35) | | | 1088 | 1110 | | |
| Jean d'Estèbe (Note: called from Morlaàs by the King of Navarre) | | | 1366 | | | |
| Jean Péclaver | | | 1594 | | | |

=== Essayeur ===
The essayeur (English: quality controller, tester) in each mint had varying rights depending on the period. This section, unlike the preceding sections, summarizes the position of the essayeur in French Mints during the 16th century. The situation in Navarre and Béarn would have been the same.

The essayeur was responsible for performing quality control by testing the gold, silver and billon delivered to the maître particulier of the mint as raw materials for production, as well as the finished products. He was present for all deliveries. As a bonus, he was entitled to keep one half of the peuilles from all the monnaie blanche (i.e. gold and silver coins) and monnaie noire (i.e. coins of little value, with little precious metal content, such as billon and copper) and the garde the other half. The essayeur and the maître particulier were responsible for measuring value, and the garde was responsible for measuring weight. It was forbidden for the essayeur to be associated with the maître particulier or his clerk, but if he had taken the oath customarily sworn by the laborers and or the minters, he could labor and or mint alongside of them.

In 1723, the essayeurs were ordered to mark gold and silver bullion that were brought to them for testing with their unique stamps and to maintain individual registers.

At the end of the 17th century, the office of the essayeur in the Mint of Pau cost 3,000 livres, offered 125 livres of remuneration, and entitled the holder to a bonus of 8 deniers per marc of gold and 4 deniers per marc of silver currency produced.

The Essayeurs of Morlaàs (incomplete)
| Name | Date Appointed | Date Confirmed (Note: by the Chambre des Comptes) | Date Assumed Office | Date Departed Office | Reason | Sources |
|---|---|---|---|---|---|---|
| Jean d'Andonhs | | | 1514 | | | |
| Jean de Pavie | | | 1543 | | | |
| Bertrand Dumas and Jean Fournier | | | 1562 | 1566 | | |
| Sauvat de Harfort | | | 1573 | 1574 | | |
| Guillaume Lamy | | | 1581 | | | |
| Antoine de Belleville | | | 1582 | 1592 | | |
| Roger de Gassie | | | 1593 | 1643 | | |

=== Graveur / Tailleur ===
At the end of the 17th century, the tailleur (English: sizer), or graveur (English: engraver), had 200 livres of remuneration, and a bonus of 16 deniers per marc of gold and 8 deniers per marc of silver coins remelted.

The Graveurs of Morlaàs (incomplete)
| Name | Date Appointed | Date Confirmed (Note: by the Chambre des Comptes) | Date Assumed Office | Date Departed Office | Reason | Sources |
|---|---|---|---|---|---|---|
| Jean Bazet, aka Jean Baset | | | 1543 | 1566 | | |
| Jérôme Lenormant | | | 1573 | 1580 | | |
| Guillaume Lamy | | | 1580 | 1609 | resigned | |
| Jean Lamy | | 23 Jun 1609 by patente | | 1637 | | |
| Minvielle | | | 1661 | | | |
| Bertrand de Beaumont | | | 1661 | | | |

=== Other Officers ===
The Mint of Pau also had four tireurs de barre, without fixed compensation, who shared the bonus with the monnayeurs. The fr:ajusteurs, eight in number, earned 2 sols per marc of gold and 1 sol per sols of silver.
