= Armand Joseph Dubernad =

French businessman and diplomat (1741–1799)

Armand Joseph Dubernad (23 November 1741, in Bayonne-9 May 1799, in Morlaix) was a merchant, a French and Spanish financier, Consul general of the Holy Roman Empire, deputy, mayor, and cofounder of the first Jacobin Club of Brittany.

== Biography ==
Dubernard was the son of a middle-class man of Bayonne. But, his family originally came from La Bastide-Clairence and before that from Laplume, in the north of Gascony.

== Before the Revolution ==
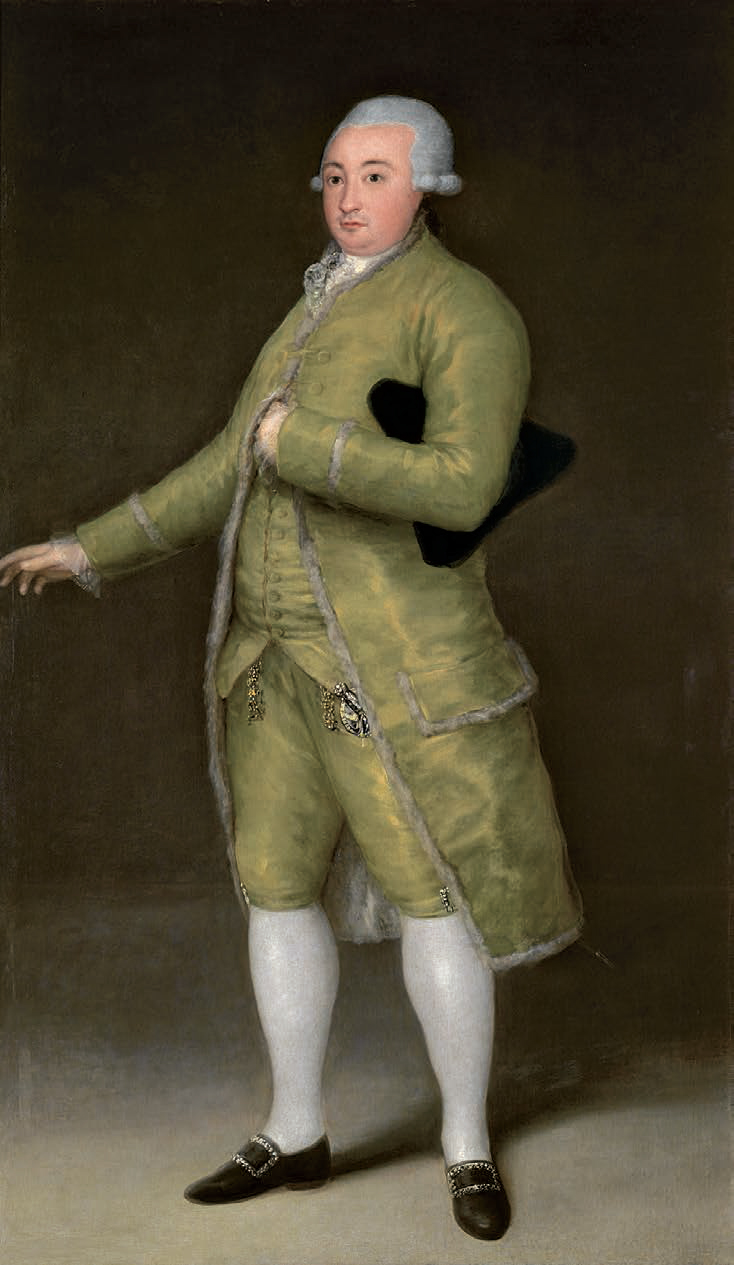
A member of his family, François Cabarrus, by Goya.

Before the French revolution started, Armand Joseph Dubernad traded with China, Europe, Eastern and Western Indies, with Morlaix, Seville and Cádiz. He was one of the principal shareholders of the bank of Saint-Charles and various companies which finance great work and contribute to reduce the Spanish debt. His close cousin, the count François Cabarrus, was Minister of king Charles III of Spain. His cousins, the Lesseps, his father-in-law, his brother-in-law and his brother are diplomatic wealthy persons. Dubernad also plays a part of precursor in the field of marine insurance.

== During the Revolution ==
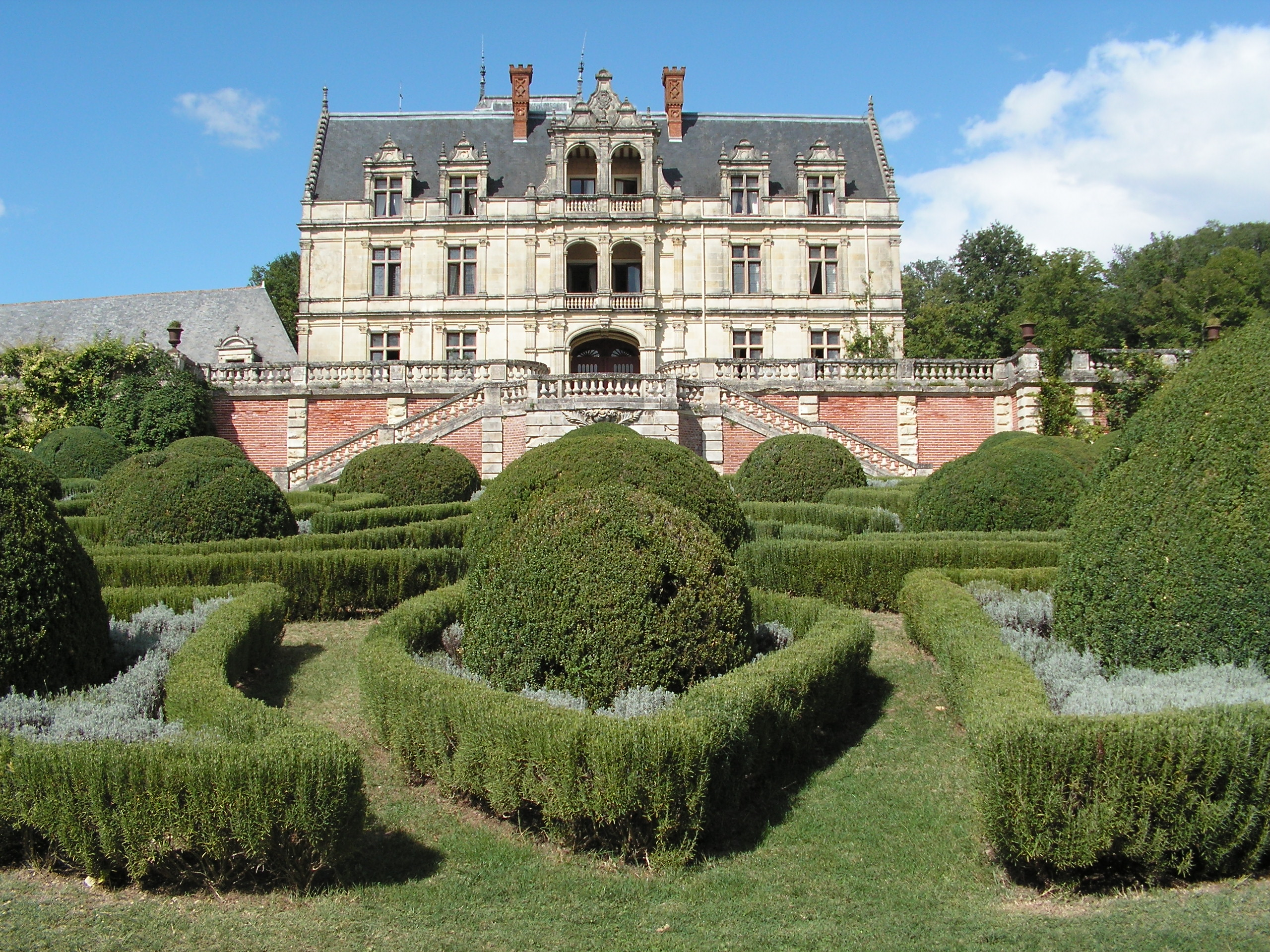
His castle named château de la Bourdaisière.

In 1788, he was appointed deputy of the Third Estate in Rennes, then appointed Sénéchaussée of Morlaix. In 1789, Armand Joseph Dubernad is listed among the writers of the Cahiers de Doléances (= Register of grievances) of the city. In 1790, he is the cofounder of the first Jacobin Club of Brittany, of which he became president.

During The Terror, Armand Joseph Dubernad rebuilt one of the castles of the wife of Philippe Egalité, La Bourdaisière, near from Montlouis destroyed following a whim of Etienne François de Choiseul.

After Thermidor, in the night of the 14 to 15 Vendémiaire An IV (6 October to 7th, 1795), a poster is placarded with Morlaix, denouncing Dubernad as an aristocrat, royalist and banker of Charette. It was signed by the brother of the Général Moreau and by others former prisoners of the revolutionary jails.

Dubernad died in 1799, almost ruined because of the English blockade, and loans to help the poor or to finance the revolutionary festivals.

== The family ==
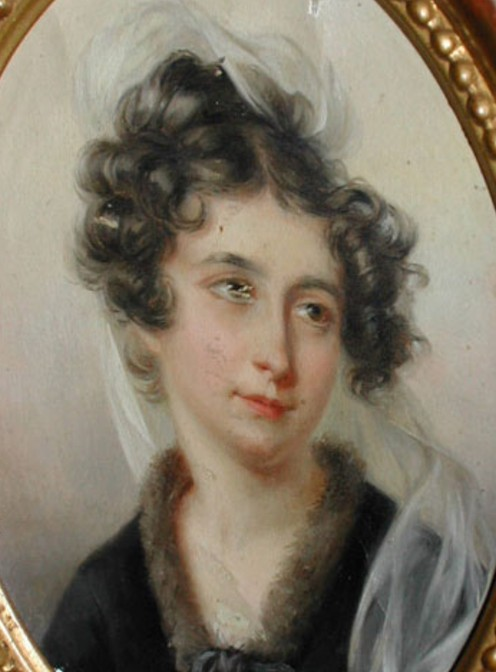
His granddaughter, Françoise Gaudelet d'Armenonville.

His father-in-law and then his brother-in-law, Jean and Gaspard Lannux de La Chaume are Consuls of Spain in France, before the Revolution. His son married the daughter of Michel Behic, niece of the first French constitutional bishop, Louis-Alexandre Expilly de la Poipe, and also sister-in-law of the brother of the Général Moreau.

Armand Joseph Dubernad is Consul general of the Holy Roman Empire in Morlaix. His brother, Salvat du Bernad, in the same time, is before the French Revolution, a rich trader and a very important financier of Seville and the Consul of the Grand Duchy of Tuscany in France and Spain. But, his brother will be imprisoned as of the entry in war of the Spain to have supposedly wanted to set fire to the manufacture of the tobaccos of Seville. During the Peninsular War, he will be the consular agent of France, in Seville until in 1812.

His granddaughter, Françoise Gaudelet d'Armenonville will marry Auguste de Rambaud, who is the son of Agathe de Rambaud, then in her second marriage to the count Amédée d'Allonville.

His grandson, the captain Henry Dubernad is the nephew of the French Vice Admiral Jacques Bergeret. In 1796, his uncle, Bergeret, as captain of the frigate 'La Virginie', was captured by Sir Edward Pellew in the Indefatigable. An English offer to exchange him for Sir Sidney Smith was refused by the French. On Smith's escape in 1798, Bergeret was sent home unconditionally by the English.
