= Chancery of Navarre =

When the Kingdom of Navarre was united with France by the marriage of Philip IV of France with Joan I Queen Regnant of Navarre and Countess of Champagne on 16 August 1284, it kept the long existing Chancery of Navarre (French: Chancellerie de Navarre). The Kings of Navarre had private Chancellors dating back to ancient kings. Theobald II of Navarre had a Vice-Chancellor, according to letters dated 1259.

In 1512, Ferdinand the Catholic, King of Aragon and son of John II of Aragon and Navarre, invaded the Kingdom of Navarre, beginning the Spanish conquest of Iberian Navarre, during the reign of Jean III d'Albret and Catherine de Foix-Béarn, and quickly conquered all of Upper Navarre and part of Lower Navarre. Jean III d'Albret tried to retake his kingdom, first in 1512, but failed despite French support, then again in 1516. Depressed by the defeats and adverse diplomatic results, he died at the castle of Esgouarrabaque in Monein, in Béarn, on 14 June 1516. His son, Henry II, attempted to reconquer the kingdom, again with French help, but this time supported by a popular revolt, however, despite some initial success, he was defeated at the Battle of Noáin on 30 June 1521 and lost all he had reconquered.

Henry II moved his capital to Saint-Palais. In 1524, Charles Quint invaded Guyenne and Lower Navarre. Henry II was taken prisoner during the Battle of Pavia, in French-controlled Lombardy, on 24 February 1525, and married Marguerite, the sister of François I of France, the following year. A new attempt by Charles Quint to reconquer Lower Navarre in 1527 was only partially successful, after which he abandoned the idea of reconquering the country.

The deconsecrated St. Paul's Church housed the Chancery of Navarre for the century of its existence Saint-Palais, from 1524 to 1624. The 1522–23 meetings of the Estates of Navarre were also held in the building.

== Chancellors of Navarre: 1512–1624 ==
Pierre de Biaix was already Chancellor of Navarre in 1512 when the kingdom was invaded and remained loyal to Henry II following the death of Jean III d'Albret. He remained Chancellor of Navarre until at least 11 August 1526, perhaps longer.

The position of Chancellor of Navarre was eliminated at the time of the formation of the Parliament of Navarre and Béarn in 1624.

Other Chancellors of Navarre 1524–1624:

- Pierre de Biaix (1512–1526)
- Bernard d'Abbadie, after 2 February 1526 and until 1540
- Nicolas Compain, before 8 August 1572
- Nicolas d'Angu, Bishop of Mende
- Louis de Glatenx, before 15 February 1581
- Henri de Mêmes
- Pierre Martin, Sr., before 1590
- Pierre Martin, Jr., after 7 October 1590
- Michel Huraut de l'Hopital, Seigneur du Fay (†1592–93)
- Sieur Soffrey de Calignon, on 6 June 1593 († 9 September 1606 in Paris), President of the court of the Parliament of Dauphine, and Maître des Requêtes ordinaires de l’Hôtel de Navarre, following the vacancy created by the death of the Sieur du Fay
- Nicolas Brûlart de Sillery

Vice Chancellors of Navarre 1524–1624:

- the Sieur de La Motte, Vice Chancellor of Navarre and Maître des Requêtes, before 11 March 1576
- Pierre de Lostal, before 1610
- Jean d'Esquille, before 4 June 1621

Prosecutor and Attorney General of Navarre 1524–1624:

- Jean de Laforcade (26 April 1589–10 May 1594)
