= Sovereign Council of Navarre and Béarn =

The Sovereign Council of Navarre and Béarn (French: Conseil Souverain de Navarre et de Béarn) was created by Henry II of Navarre at the Château de Pau on 13 June 1519, replacing the Cour Majour which was disbanded in 1490.

It functioned as a Conseil d'État and was composed of counsellors (French: conseillers), a prosecutor general (French: procureur général), a criminal prosecutor (French: procureur criminel), an attorney general (French: avocat général), several second presidents (French: second présidents) and one first president (French: premier président). These offices were essentially bought and sold, often passed down during generations within the same families. The purchase, sale or transfer of the office required the ratification of the Chambre des Comptes of Navarre in Pau, who acted on behalf of the king.

In October 1620, together with the Chancery of Navarre based in Saint-Palais, it was merged to form the Parliament of Navarre and Béarn ("Parlement de Navarre et Béarn") in Pau.

The registers of the Conseil Souverain of Navarre and Béarn for the period 1547 until 1620 are held Archives Départementales des Pyrénées-Atlantiques in Pau.
