= Urkulu =

Mountain in the Basque Country

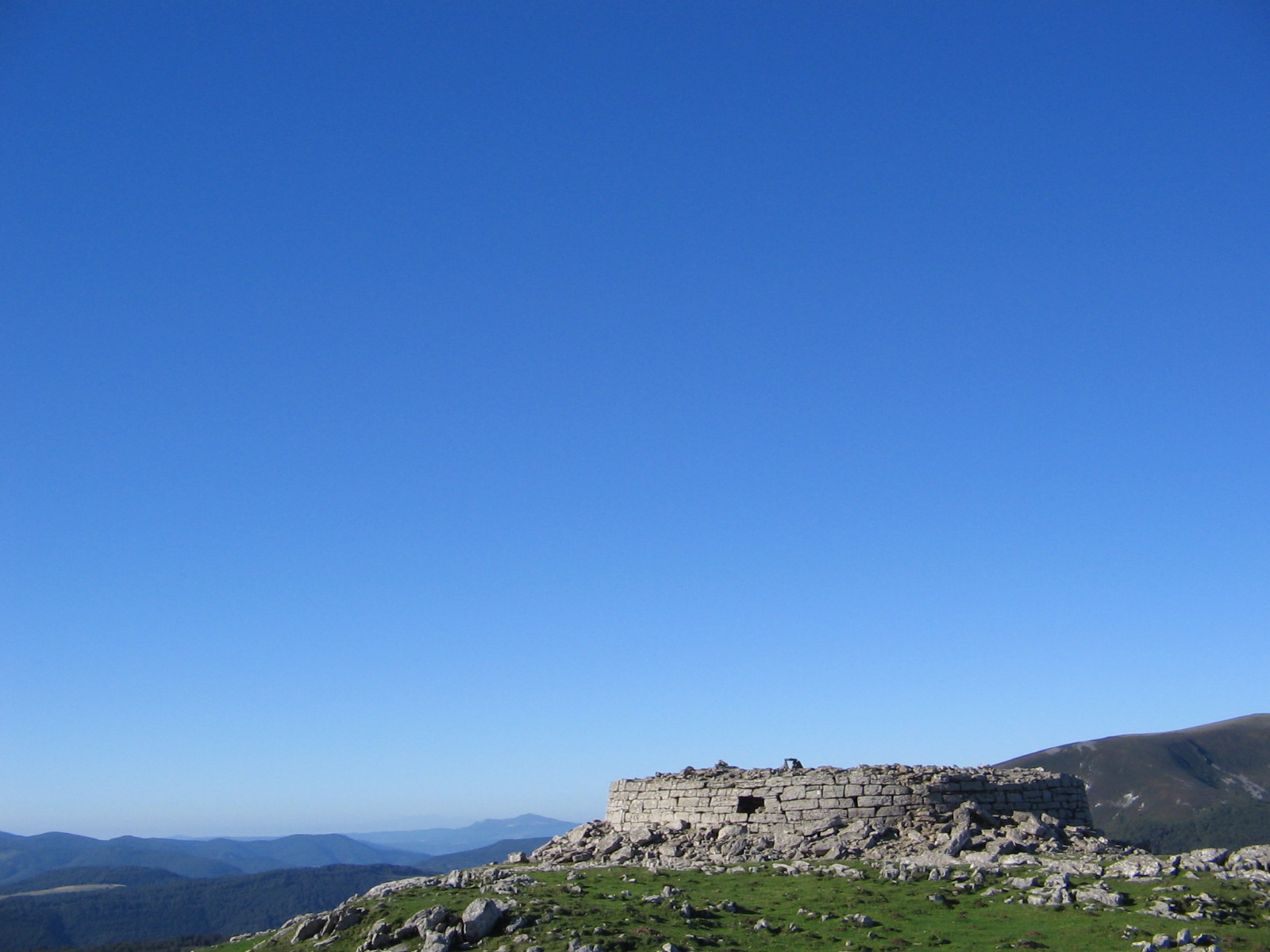
- Remains of the Roman tower on Urkulu's summit

Highest point
- Elevation: 1,419 m (4,656 ft)
- Prominence: 181 m (594 ft)
- Coordinates: 43°2′44.52″N 01°14′28.6″W

Naming
- Language of name: Basque
- Pronunciation: Basque: [uɾˈkulu]

Geography
- Location within Spain
- Location: Spain, France
- Parent range: Pyrenees

Climbing
- Easiest route: From Organbidexka

Urkulu (1,419 m) is a mountain in the Basque Country straddling the border between France and Spain. The summit is located in the western Pyrenees, within walking distance from Roncevaux and close to the so-called French Way of St James, which crosses the mountain range at the historic Roncevaux Pass.

== Access ==
The mountain is easily accessible from the old arms factory of Orbaizeta in Navarre and Béhérobie (via the Organbidexka pass) in Lower Navarre, and is also located on the trekking trail stretching east to west along the southern slopes of the Pyrenees, the GR 11.

== History ==
The main feature of the mountain is the remains of a Roman tower topping the summit. With the summit providing excellent views over the northern and southern slopes alike, it was used as a watchtower in medieval times.
