= Lower Navarre =

Coordinates: 43°10′N 1°14′W

Lower Navarre Nafarroa Beherea
- Province
- Flag Coat of arms

- Location of Lower Navarre within the Pyrénées-Atlantiques departement.
- Country: France
- CA: Basque Country; Pays Basque
- Capital: Saint-Jean-Pied-de-Port (Donibane Garazi)

Area
  - Total: 1,325 km^{2} (512 sq mi)

Population (2011)
  - Total: 30,290
- Time zone: UTC+1 (CET)
  - Summer (DST): UTC+2 (CEST)

Lower Navarre (Basque: Nafarroa Beherea/Baxenabarre; Gascon/Bearnese: Navarra Baisha; French: Basse-Navarre [bɑs navaʁ]; Spanish: Baja Navarra) is a traditional region of the present-day French département of Pyrénées-Atlantiques. It corresponds to the northernmost region of the Kingdom of Navarre during the Middle Ages. After the Spanish conquest of Iberian Navarre (1512–24), this merindad was restored to the rule of the native king, Henry II. Its capitals were Saint-Jean-Pied-de-Port and Saint-Palais. In the extreme north there was the little sovereign Principality of Bidache, with an area of 1,284 km^{2} (496 mi^{2}) and a decreasing population of 44,450 (in 1901), 25,356 (in 1990).

Although this denomination is not completely correct from the historical point of view, it is also known as Merindad de Ultrapuertos ("the regions beyond the mountain passes") by the southerners, and Deça-ports ("this side of the mountain passes") by the Gascon-speakers. Despite its lost administrative cohesion, the memory of its past heyday has left an imprint on its inhabitants, who keep identifying themselves as Lower Navarrese and therefore Navarrese. The Nafarroaren Eguna or Day of Navarre is a festival held in Baigorri every year to strengthen their bonds and celebrate their Basque identity as one of the seven constituent regions of the Basque Country.

== Geography ==
Lower Navarre is a collection of valleys in the foothills of the Pyrenees. The Aldudes valley, around the town of Saint-Étienne-de-Baïgorry in the south of Lower Navarre, preserves many old traditions, with houses of pink sandstone and contests of Force Basque, the basque traditional strength sports. The Irouléguy wines are produced in the area around the town of Irouléguy.

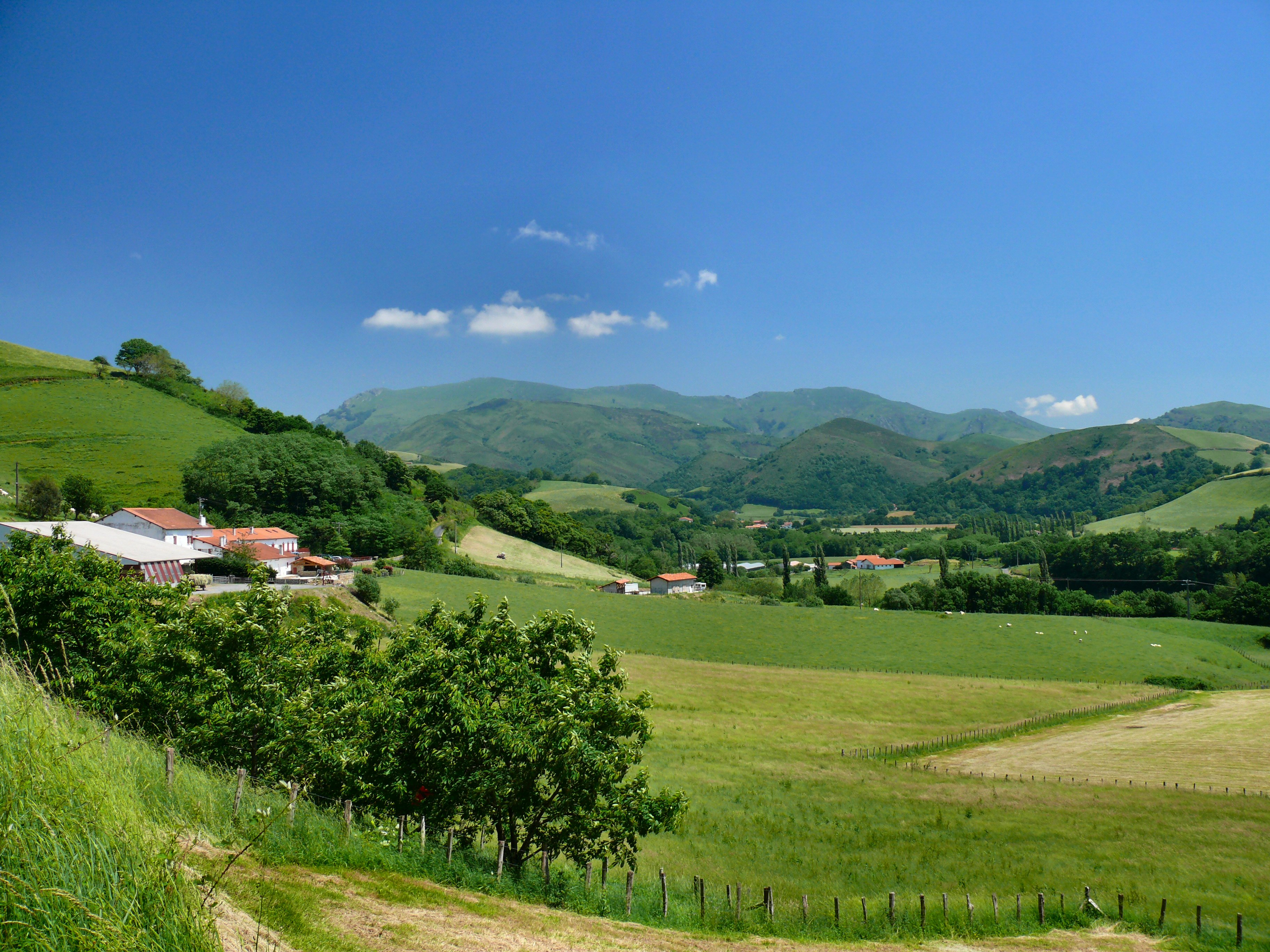
Landscape in the vicinity of Irouleguy, in Lower Navarre, June 2009

The river Nive rises in Lower Navarre and flows through the province and on to Bayonne, where it meets the Adour. Beyond Saint-Jean-Pied-de-Port itself, the Nive enters the Ossès valley, with many beautiful old houses with carved lintels in the villages of Ossès, Irissarry and Bidarray. A reserve for the pottok, the wild Basque Pyrenean pony, in the valley conserves this rare breed. The Baigura massif towers over the western valleys and sets a natural boundary with the rolling valleys of Labourd.

North of Saint-Jean-Pied-de-Port is the Mixe region around the town of Saint-Palais, a former Navarrese capital. Although close to Béarn, Basque influence and traditions are strong. Lower Navarrese is a dialect of the Basque language spoken in the region. Just south of Saint-Palais, the three principal routes to Compostela on the Way of St James met at the hamlet of Ostabat, bringing much wealth and trade to the area in medieval times.

The Way of St James headed south from Saint-Jean-Pied-de-Port towards the mountain pass above Orreaga. Pilgrims travelled across the Cize region of Lower Navarre on their way to Navarre across the mountains. In these rolling hills, ewes' milk cheese, pur brebis, is commonly made, including Ossau-Iraty cheese. Villages like Estérençuby and Lecumberry are popular for agro-tourism and the Irati beech forest on the frontier borderline is known for its views and history. Dolmens and other neolithic monuments dot the landscape, including the Tour d'Urkulu high in the mountains at 1,149m—a 2,000-year-old circular platform of huge stone blocks. Lower Navarre is well delimited by mountain ranges on the west (with Mount Iparla as its highest and most iconic landmark), south (Orreaga, Mount Urkulu and Pyrenees altogether) and the east (bounded by the western mountains of Zuberoa).

== History ==
The lands of the Lower Navarre were part of the Duchy of Vasconia that turned into Gascony by the end of the first millennium. At the time of King Sancho III of Navarre the Great (died in 1035), Duke Sancho VI William of Gascony pledged allegiance to the Navarrese king, for a short period Gascony becoming vassal to the Kingdom of Navarre, with which it had always had close ties. Moreover, the valleys of Baigorri, Ossès, Cize and Arberoa were attached to the latter, establishing the first nucleus of the Navarrese grip on the lands north of the Pyrenees. While these valleys were taken over again by Gascony for a period, the Ultrapuertos County (called Merindad in Navarre) was regained for Navarre in 1234, coming to be governed by the sheriff of Saint-Jean-Pied-de-Port. However, the definite boundaries were not established until the 1244-1245 war between the Labourdins and Navarrese came to an end.

In 1512, the Duke of Alba, under orders from King Ferdinand II of Aragon, conquered Navarre, including Saint-Jean-Pied-de-Port. The Navarrese monarchs retreated to their sovereign domain of Béarn. In 1516, King John III of Navarre retook the town of Saint-Jean-Pied-de-Port, but failed to take the citadel; he and Queen Catherine died soon after, and the 10,000 mercenary army of the Spanish king and future Holy Roman emperor Emperor Charles V recovered control of the town. Charles V's troops retained Saint-Jean-Pied-de-Port and its hinterland, besides devastating the region, but were met with strong resistance led by local lords loyal to King Henry II of Navarre. The latter succeeded in taking over the town and its castle in May 1521, losing it to the Duke of Alba in June; the spanish evacuated Saint-Jean-Pied-de-Port in 1522, but recovered it in January 1524. While possession of Saint-Jean-Pied-de-Port was hotly contested, Saint-Palais (Donapaleu in Basque) remained out of spanish reach and would become the main royal center of the surviving Navarrese monarchy in Lower Navarre.

Eventually, the legitimate Navarrese king (de facto deprived of the rest of Navarre by Aragon-Castilian usurpation), restored Navarrese official institutions and bodies in Lower Navarre, e.g. the Sovereign Council in 1523, the Chancery in 1524, the Royal Mint a little later in Saint-Palais, etc. In 1525, a new military inroad led by the spanish viceroy of Navarre subdued the region, and tried to earn the loyalty of the nobles, but they unanimously kept their allegiance to the Navarrese monarchs of the House of Albret, and the lord of Luxa and the lord of Miossens, Esteban d'Albret, reconquered the region in 1527. Although Emperor Charles V, the spanish monarch, recovered Saint-Jean-Pied-de-Port within months, by 1528 he had lost interest in asserting and maintaining his control over the portion of Navarre north of the Pyrenees, difficult to hold and defend. Accordingly, he abandoned his remaining holdings in Lower Navarre, including Saint-Jean-Pied-de-Port, to its hereditary king Henry II, as part of a treaty with France—the Treaty of Cambrai in 1530. In 1555, Henry II of Navarre died and was succeeded by his daughter Jeanne, who ruled until her death in 1572.

During the 16th century the Albrets ruled over a wider territory (Béarn, etc. as French vassals) and the effective seat of the Navarrese Royalty shifted to Pau, capital city of Béarn, where Henry III (later Henry IV of France), the son of Jeanne d'Albret was born. Henry III generally respected the laws issued by the Navarrese parliament, despite sometimes raising objections to their wordings. Henry succeeded to the French throne in 1589; he and his successors would now be titled "King of France and Navarre." His son Louis II (Louis XIII of France) was definitely reluctant to any binding reading of the Navarrese laws, and forced more loose wordings, devoid of specific meaning in order to feel his hands free. Ultimately this led to an encroaching French centralization of all relevant decisions and prerogatives during the 17 and 18th centuries.

In 1620 and 1624 respectively the House of Commons and the Justice system were merged with those of Béarn and transferred from Saint-Palais to Pau, despite protests voiced by the Navarrese representatives, who pointed to their different traditions and languages—Basque and Béarnese. The title of King of Navarre continued to be held by the lineage of the Albrets and the Bourbons up to the French Revolution, while the kingdom itself merged with France in 1620. It retained its historic personality as a kingdom and, albeit fragmented, a separate legal status. The two third estate representatives of Lower Navarre did not vote at the States-General of 1789 and its follow-up, the French National Assembly (1790), arguing that the impending new administrative arrangement was none of their business, since they did not belong in the Kingdom of France. All the same, the new French administrative design did not spare Lower Navarre. It came to be integrated in the Basses-Pyrénées department along with the rest of French Basque districts, and Béarn.

== Administration of Lower Navarre, Ancien Régime ==
The administration of the independent Kingdom of Navarre after 1512 was centralized in Saint-Palais and consisted of a handful of institutions organized in a structure generally found in the Kingdom of France. By 1527 these administrations had been partially decentralized to Pau, and consisted of:

- the Governor of Navarre and Béarn
- Estates of Navarre (French: États de Navarre), in Saint-Palais
- Chancery of Navarre, in Saint-Palais
- Chambre des Comptes of Navarre, in Pau, Nérac and Vendôme
- Mint of Navarre and Béarn (French: Monnaie de Navarre et Béarn), formed by the merger Mint of Navarre in Saint-Palais, with the mints of Béarn in Pau and Morlaàs, in Béarn, by the Chambre des Comptes of Navarre, in Pau
- Conseil Souverain of Navarre and Béarn, the predecessor of the Parliament of Navarre and Béarn, in Pau
- Conseil Privé, the King's private council for Navarre and Béarn, in Pau
