= Saint-Gladie-Arrive-Munein =

- Commune
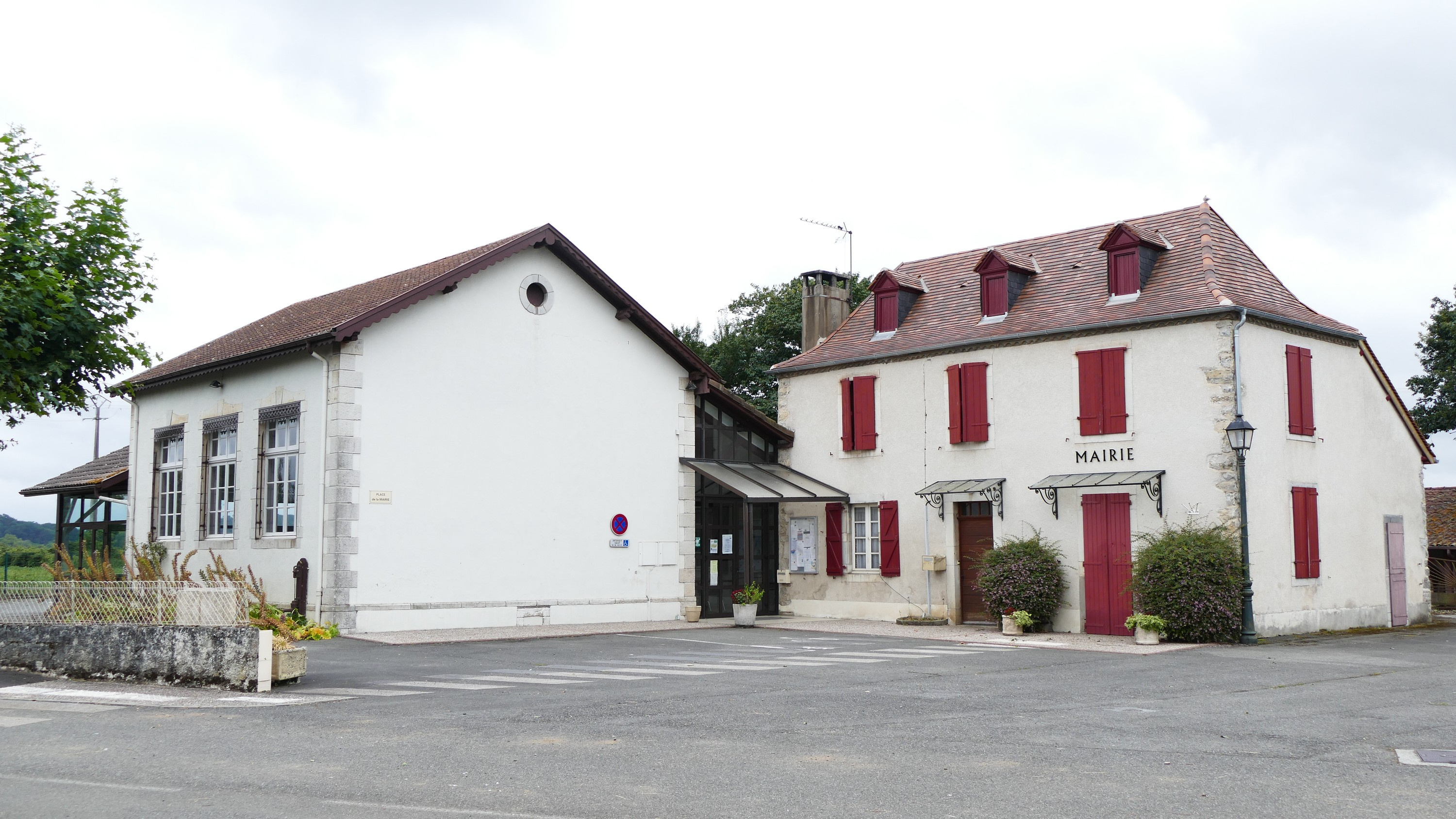
- Saint-Gladie-Arrive-Munein Town hall
- Location of Saint-Gladie-Arrive-Munein
- Location within France Location within Nouvelle-Aquitaine
- Coordinates: 43°22′52″N 0°55′52″W
- Country: France
- Region: Nouvelle-Aquitaine
- Department: Pyrénées-Atlantiques
- Arrondissement: Oloron-Sainte-Marie
- Canton: Orthez et Terres des Gaves et du Sel

Government
  - Mayor (2020–2026): Gilbert Larroude
- Area^{1}: 6.53 km^{2} (2.52 sq mi)
- Elevation: 75 m (246 ft)
- Highest elevation: 201 m (659 ft)
- Lowest elevation: 53 m (174 ft)
- Population (2023): 193
  - Density: 29.6/km^{2} (76.5/sq mi)
- Time zone: UTC+01:00 (CET)
  - Summer (DST): UTC+02:00 (CEST)
- INSEE/Postal code: 64480 /64390
- ^{1} French Land Register data, which excludes lakes, ponds, glaciers > 1 km^{2} (0.386 sq mi or 247 acres) and river estuaries.

Saint-Gladie-Arrive-Munein (French pronunciation: [sɛ̃ ɡladi aʁiv mynɛ̃]; Occitan: Sent Gladia, Arriba e Munenh) is a commune in the Pyrénées-Atlantiques department in south-western France.

The commune was created by the merger of Saint-Gladie, Arrive and Munein on May 12, 1841.

== See also ==
- Communes of the Pyrénées-Atlantiques department
