= Parlement of Pau =

Institution located in Pau

Coordinates: 43.2944°N 0.3741°W

The Parlement of Pau (French: "Parlement de Pau", alias "Parlement de Navarre et de Béarn", alias "Parlement de Navarre séant à Pau") was created in 1620 out of the merger of the Conseil Souverain of Béarn and the Chancery of Navarre, with its subordinated offices, by Louis XIII, following the incorporation of Béarn and Lower Navarre into the crown lands of France.

It was composed of a first president (French: premier président) appointed by the king, seven présidents à mortier, forty-six counsellors (French: conseillers), two attorneys general (French: avocat général), one prosecutor general (French: procureur général). It was initially divided into three Chambres called the First Bureau (French: Premier Bureau), Second Bureau (French: Second Bureau) and the Tournelle.

The Edict of 1691 further merged the Chambre des Comptes of Navarre and the subordinated Royal Mint of Navarre and Béarn, creating a fourth Chambre called the Chambre des Comptes. The same edict also folded in the Pays de Soule, previously under the Parliament of Guyenne in Bordeaux. The new entity was called the Cour de Parlement, Comptes, Aides et Finance de Navarre.

The Parlement of Pau was politically and judicially responsible for five seneschals (French: sénéchaussées) in Béarn, Pau, Oloron, Orthez, Morlaàs and Sauveterre, as well as all of the merindad of Lower Navarre and the Pays de Soule.

It was housed in Pau's old courthouse, the Palais de Justice, built in 1585 by order of Henry III of Navarre, on the prior location of the house of the Bishop of Lescar and St. Martin's Cemetery. The main building was destroyed by fire 1716. Despite a reconstruction project planned on the edge of the Place Royale, it was rebuilt on its original site in 1722.

The Parlement of Pau was disbanded in 1789 as a result of the French Revolution.

== See also ==
- Estates of Navarre
