= Sigalens =

- Commune
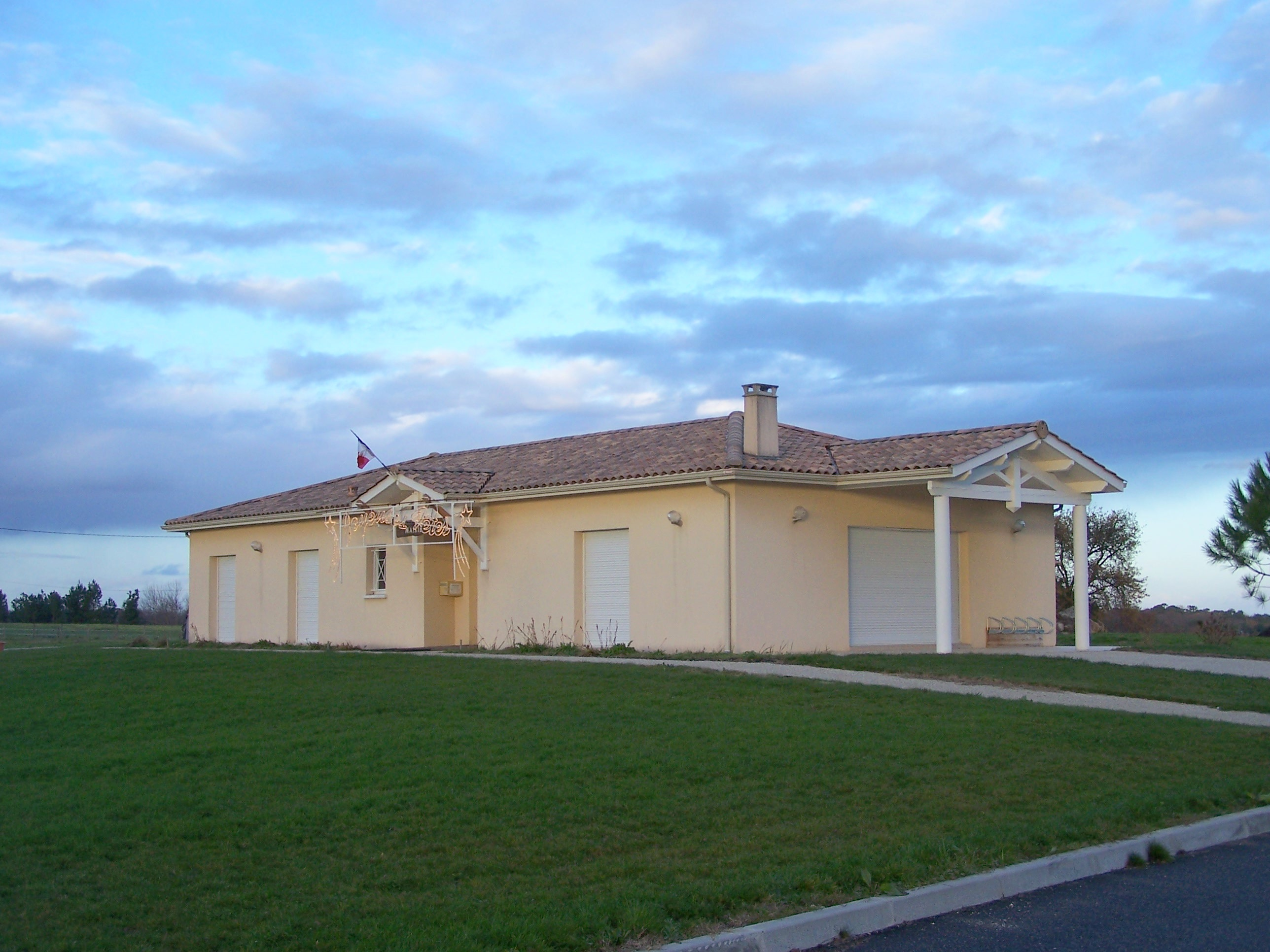
- The town hall in Sigalens
- Location of Sigalens
- Location within France Location within Nouvelle-Aquitaine
- Coordinates: 44°27′01″N 0°02′39″W
- Country: France
- Region: Nouvelle-Aquitaine
- Department: Gironde
- Arrondissement: Langon
- Canton: Le Réolais et Les Bastides
- Intercommunality: Bazadais

Government
  - Mayor (2020–2026): Jean-Marc Vazia
- Area^{1}: 18.33 km^{2} (7.08 sq mi)
- Elevation: 129 m (423 ft)
- Highest elevation: 136 m (446 ft)
- Lowest elevation: 33 m (108 ft)
- Population (2023): 342
  - Density: 18.7/km^{2} (48.3/sq mi)
- Time zone: UTC+01:00 (CET)
  - Summer (DST): UTC+02:00 (CEST)
- INSEE/Postal code: 33512 /33690
- ^{1} French Land Register data, which excludes lakes, ponds, glaciers > 1 km^{2} (0.386 sq mi or 247 acres) and river estuaries.

Sigalens is a commune in the Gironde department in Nouvelle-Aquitaine in southwestern France. As of 2019 it has a population of 362.

== Population ==
Historical population
Year	Pop.	±% p.a.
1968	346	—
1975	292	−2.39%
1982	252	−2.08%
1990	239	−0.66%
1999	238	−0.05%
2007	292	+2.59%
2012	379	+5.35%
2017	381	+0.11%
2023	342	−1.78%
Source: INSEE

== See also ==
- Communes of the Gironde department
