= Laplume =

- Commune
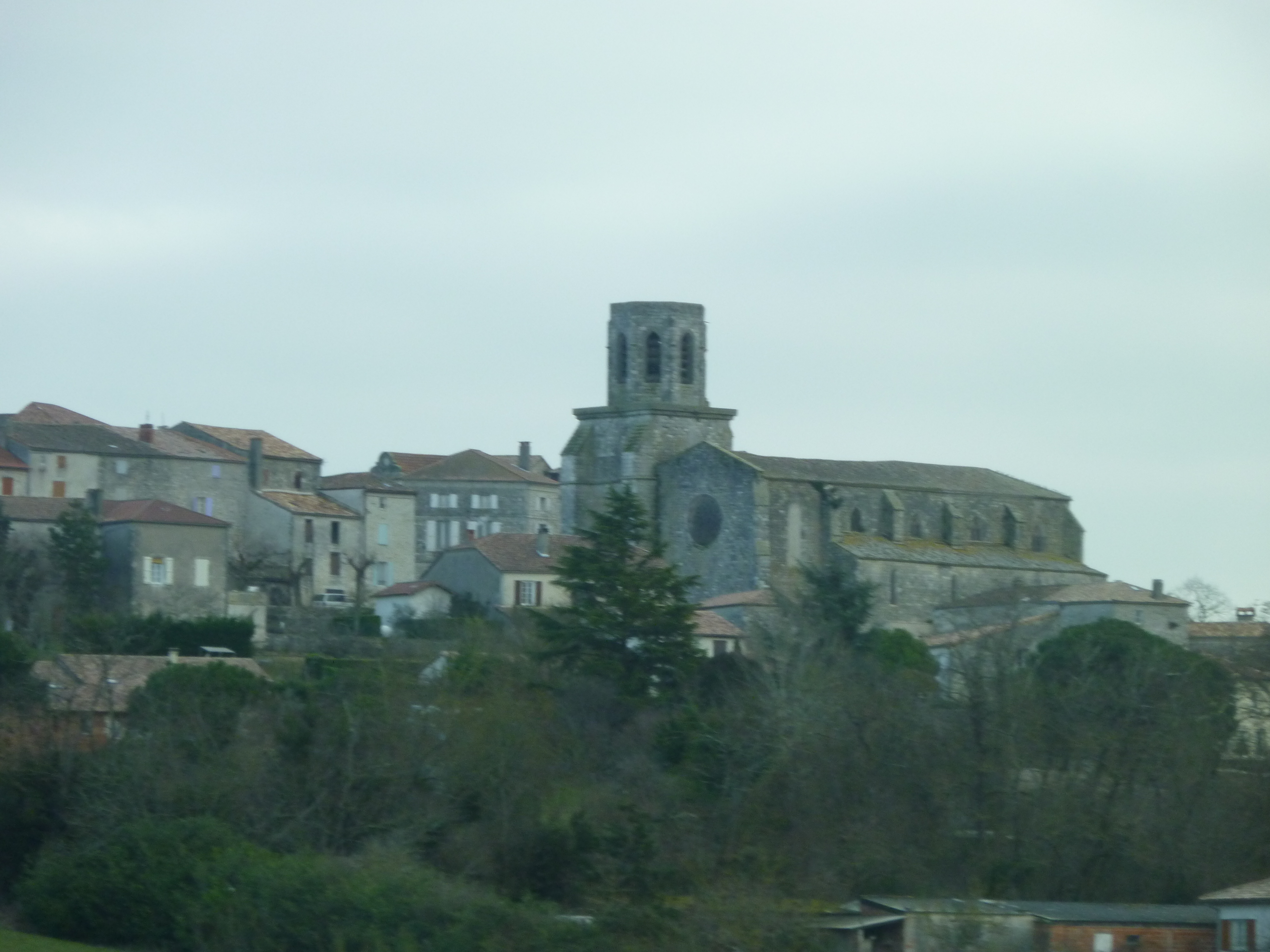
- The church and surrounding buildings in Laplume

- Coat of arms
- Location of Laplume
- Location within France Location within Nouvelle-Aquitaine
- Coordinates: 44°06′46″N 0°31′56″E
- Country: France
- Region: Nouvelle-Aquitaine
- Department: Lot-et-Garonne
- Arrondissement: Agen
- Canton: L'Ouest agenais
- Intercommunality: Agglomération d'Agen

Government
  - Mayor (2020–2026): Séverine Bonnet Coudert
- Area^{1}: 32.64 km^{2} (12.60 sq mi)
- Elevation: 219 m (719 ft)
- Highest elevation: 218 m (715 ft)
- Lowest elevation: 69 m (226 ft)
- Population (2023): 1,330
  - Density: 40.7/km^{2} (106/sq mi)
- Time zone: UTC+01:00 (CET)
  - Summer (DST): UTC+02:00 (CEST)
- INSEE/Postal code: 47137 /47310
- ^{1} French Land Register data, which excludes lakes, ponds, glaciers > 1 km^{2} (0.386 sq mi or 247 acres) and river estuaries.

Laplume (French pronunciation: [laplym]; Occitan: La Pluma) is a commune in the Lot-et-Garonne department in south-western France.

== See also ==
- Communes of the Lot-et-Garonne department
- Dubernad
