= Sauveterre-de-Béarn =

- Commune
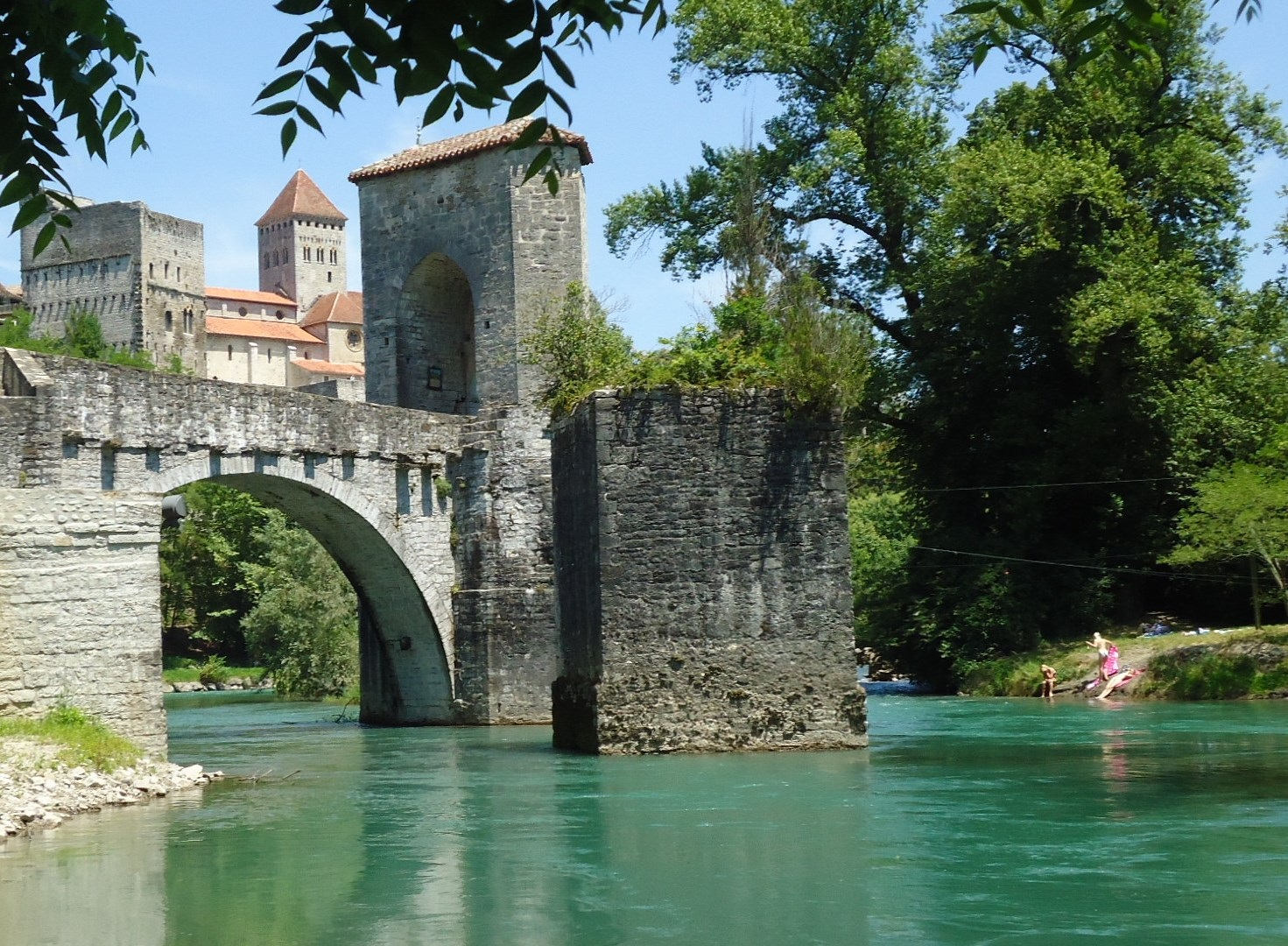
- View up to Medieval village of Sauveterre de Bearn with the Pont de la Legende (foreground)

- Coat of arms
- Location of Sauveterre-de-Béarn
- Location within France Location within Nouvelle-Aquitaine
- Coordinates: 43°24′02″N 0°56′19″W
- Country: France
- Region: Nouvelle-Aquitaine
- Department: Pyrénées-Atlantiques
- Arrondissement: Oloron-Sainte-Marie
- Canton: Orthez et Terres des Gaves et du Sel
- Intercommunality: Béarn des Gaves

Government
  - Mayor (2020–2026): Jean Labour
- Area^{1}: 14.54 km^{2} (5.61 sq mi)
- Elevation: 71 m (233 ft)
- Highest elevation: 205 m (673 ft)
- Lowest elevation: 44 m (144 ft)
- Population (2023): 1,375
  - Density: 94.57/km^{2} (244.9/sq mi)
- Time zone: UTC+01:00 (CET)
  - Summer (DST): UTC+02:00 (CEST)
- INSEE/Postal code: 64513 /64390
- ^{1} French Land Register data, which excludes lakes, ponds, glaciers > 1 km^{2} (0.386 sq mi or 247 acres) and river estuaries.

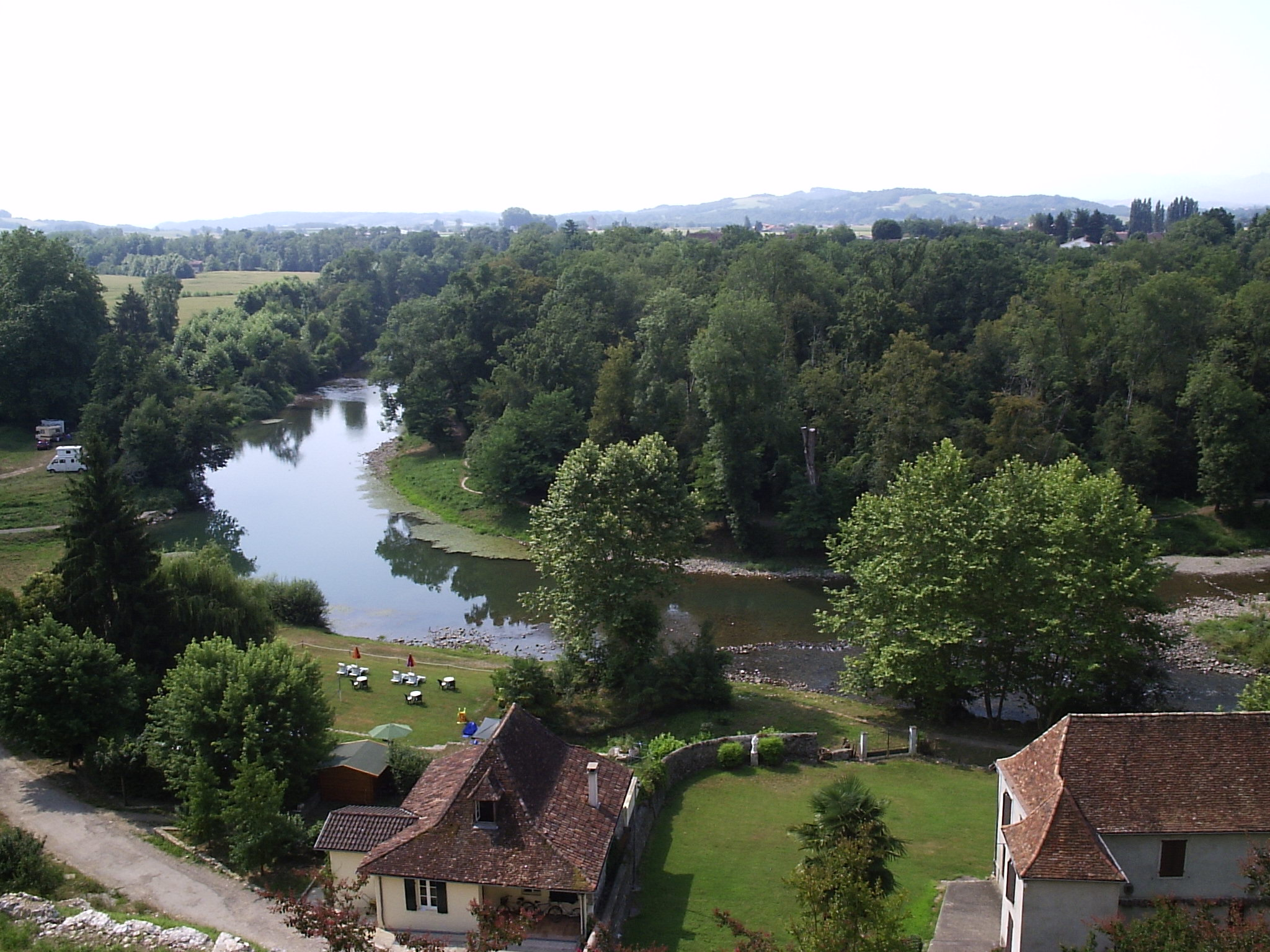
Gave d'Oloron River

Sauveterre-de-Béarn (French pronunciation: [sovtɛʁ də beaʁn], literally Sauveterre of Béarn; Occitan: Sauvatèrra; Basque: Salbaterra Bearno) is a medieval village perched above the Gave d'Oloron and facing the Pyrenees in south-western France. It is a commune in the Pyrénées-Atlantiques department.

== History ==
While the stone portions of the drawbridge remain, the wooden section is no longer there and the terminal of the bridge has been walled. The church and many buildings remain in their original condition.

In the Middle Ages the town was used to keep a watch from its lofty heights on Gascony and the bordering Navarre. The remains of the bridge provide the most impressive view of the town above.

== Miscellaneous ==
Sauveterre de Bearn appeared in the Trevanian (aka Rod Whitaker) novel The Summer of Katya under the name Alos. In the book, it is where the Festival of the Drowned Virgin takes place.

== See also ==
- Communes of the Pyrénées-Atlantiques department
