= Chambre des Comptes (Navarre) =

The Chambres des Comptes de Navarre, alias Cour des Comptes de Navarre (English: Court of Auditors of Navarre), was formed in April 1624 during the reign of Louis XIII through the act of merging the Chambre des Comptes of Pau with the Chambre des Comptes of Nérac into one entity. In 1691, it was merged into the Parliament of Navarre and Béarn in Pau. The First President and the two Presidents, became Président à mortiers in the Parliament.

The Chambre des Comptes of Pau and the Chambre des Comptes of Nérac were created at the same time by Henry II of Navarre on 4 January 1527,

== Chambre des Comptes in Pau ==
The Chambre des Comptes in Pau was given responsibility for Lower Navarre, Béarn, the County of Foix and Bigorre, the Viscounties of Marsan, Turson, Gavardon and the Barony of Captieux, the Viscounties of Lautrec and Nébouzan, the Barony of After-Villemure, and the four valleys of the Aure.

It was reconfirmed and authorized by his successor, Antoine of Navarre, on 11 September 1560, who made at the same time a number of laws to set out the powers of the officers, not only for the Chambre des Comptes in Pau, but also for those of Nérac and Vendôme.

Among these laws were those that determined the number of officers that each one had to have, namely one President, five Counselors/Auditors, a Registrar, a Huissier and a Patrimonial Prosecutor (a "Procureur Patrimonial"); the jurisdiction and knowledge were set forth for all matters concerning the types of income and expense accounting, and the circumstances and dependencies, all the same, and with the same authority and justice that had belonged to the King himself.

By 28 October 1563, the number of huissiers had been increased to two.

The number of counselors/auditors was increased to six with the addition of a position of Supernumerary on 28 October 1563, but the first such supernumerary was only installed in office on 3 January 1568.

On 30 September 1569, the Queen Regnant Jeanne published new laws about religion with two main principles: the first being to suspend all officers who were not Huguenot and prohibit the Lieutenant General from enlisting Catholics, and the second being to seize the property and assets, ecclesiastical or secular, of those who disobeyed her and to sell them on public auction. This latter is, in essence, the beginning of war in Béarn.

=== First Presidents ===
First Presidents of the Chambres des Comptes of Pau (in chronological order):

Premier Présidents de la Chambre de Comptes of Pau (incomplete)
Name	Date Appointed	Date Confirmed (Note: by the Chambre des Comptes)	Date Assumed Office	Date Departed Office	Reason	Sources
Jacques de Foix, Bishop of Lescar						
François, Monsieur de Candale						
Louis d’Albret						
Monsignor the Bishop of Aure						
Mathieu Du Pac (Note: simultaneously President of the Conseil Souverain)						
Mr. de Mende, Chancellor of Foix						
Bertrand d’Abbadie			1550			
Sieur de Salettes	8 Dec 1570	26 Feb 1571	1558?			
Pierre de Tisnés			1560			
Guilhem d’Areau or Dareau (Note: previously the Attorney General on the Conseil Souverain)			1567	before 8 Dec 1571	death	
(Arnaud?) de La Forcade						
Arnaud de Tisnés (Note: while also serving as a Conseiller Ordinaire on the Conseil Souverain)	24 Oct 1571 by commission					
de La Motte (Note: previously Vice-Chancellor of Navarre and Maître des Requêtes)	11 Mar 1576					
Arnaud de Tisnés	23 Apr 1577 by letters patents	2 Nov 1577			death	
Jean de La Forcade (Note: while also serving as a Conseiller Ordinaire on the Conseil Souverain)	4 or 14 Sep 1586		20 Oct 1586		death	
Pierre Dupont			1590?			
de La Valade (Note: previously Attorney General and President of the Chambre des Comptes in Nérac)	7 May 1591	20 Jul 1592				
Charles Dupont			1617			
Gratien Dupont			1621			
Antoine Dupont (Anthonin de Pont)			1671			

=== Procureur Patrimonial ===
Procureur Patrimonial de la Chambre de Comptes of Pau (incomplete)
Name	Date Appointed	Date Confirmed	Date Assumed Office	Date Departed Office	Reason	Sources
Odet de Forbet			before 1568			
Jacques de Forbet			7 Sep 1571			

=== Prosecutor and Attorneys General ===
- Martin Legros

Attorney General (following the separation of the positions):

- N...Lamotte
- Guillaume Dareau
- Jean d'Esquille
- Pierre Garros, in 1571
- Jean de Lendresse, 21 September 1583
- Pierre Dupont, 31 October 1584
- Charles Dupont, 31 October 1619

== Chambre des Comptes in Nérac ==
In addition to the responsibility for the Duchy of Albret at the time it was formed, it was also responsible for the County of Armagnac and all of its dependent territories, the Pays d'Eaussan, the Seigneurie of Rivière-Basse, the County of Rodez, the four Castellans of Rouergue, the County of Périgord, and the Viscounty of Limoges.

=== First Presidents ===
First Presidents of the Chambres des Comptes of Nérac (in chronological order):

Premier Présidents de la Chambre de Comptes of Nérac (incomplete)
Name	Date Appointed	Date Confirmed	Date Assumed Office	Date Departed Office	Reason	Sources
Jean Secondat, Seigneur de Roques			before 1576			
Vénière			1624			
de Bayard			1645			
Jean de Doat			1646			
Antoine de Bayard			1680			
Jacques-Joseph de Doat, son of the aforementioned Jean			1691			
