= Auvillar =

- Commune
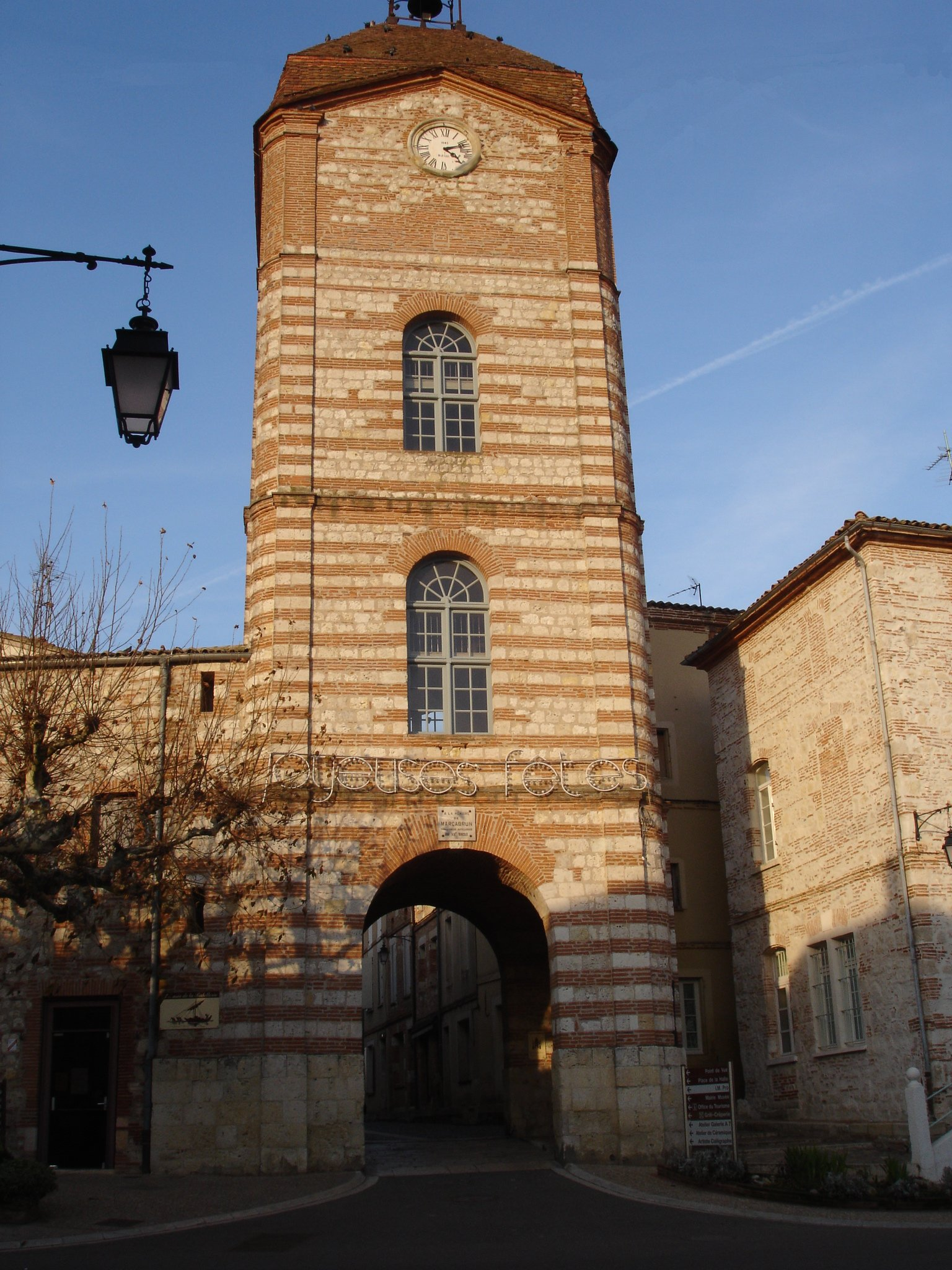
- Clock tower

- Coat of arms
- Location of Auvillar
- Location within France Location within Occitanie
- Coordinates: 44°04′13″N 0°54′02″E
- Country: France
- Region: Occitania
- Department: Tarn-et-Garonne
- Arrondissement: Castelsarrasin
- Canton: Garonne-Lomagne-Brulhois
- Intercommunality: CC Deux Rives

Government
  - Mayor (2020–2026): Olivier Renaud
- Area^{1}: 15.6 km^{2} (6.0 sq mi)
- Elevation: 148 m (486 ft)
- Highest elevation: 166 m (545 ft)
- Lowest elevation: 52 m (171 ft)
- Population (2023): 895
  - Density: 57.4/km^{2} (149/sq mi)
- Time zone: UTC+01:00 (CET)
  - Summer (DST): UTC+02:00 (CEST)
- INSEE/Postal code: 82008 /82340
- ^{1} French Land Register data, which excludes lakes, ponds, glaciers > 1 km^{2} (0.386 sq mi or 247 acres) and river estuaries.

Auvillar (French pronunciation: [ovilaʁ]; Occitan: Autvilar) is a commune in the department of Tarn-et-Garonne and the Occitanie region, situated at the edge of the Lomagne region on the banks of the Garonne river. Since 1994, Auvillar has been a member of Les Plus Beaux Villages de France (The Most Beautiful Villages of France) Association with its harbor area and outstanding monuments like the circular hall, the clock tower and the Church of St. Peter. Auvillar is a stop for tourists and pilgrims on the Santiago de Compostela pilgrimage route.

== Inhabitants ==
Its inhabitants are called Auvillarais, Auvillaraises.

== Geography ==
The village is located on the Auvillar Garonne, between the cities of Agen and Montauban. It is situated on a rocky outcrop overlooking the river. The view stretches from the gates of the Aquitaine to the coast of Quercy. After the long plain, a suspension bridge crosses the Garonne between Espalais and Auvillar port.

== History ==
First known as a city Gallo-Romane (Alta Villa) Auvillar was an oppidum set on a rocky outcrop. It suffered many invasions, especially of Normans until the eleventh century. In the twelfth century, the city became the capital and property of the Count of Armagnac. Becoming in the sixteenth century part of the kings of Navarre. Auvillar became attached to the crown of France after the crowning of Henri IV in 1589. Its fortress subjected the city to many conflicts in the region, from the Crusade against the Albigensians, the Hundred Years' War, the wars of religion and the Catholic League. In the seventeenth to the nineteenth century Auvillar owed its prosperity to two industries, pottery (the plant was located at a place called Lance), and the preparation of pens of goose feathers used in calligraphy. At the beginning of the nineteenth century, boatman traffic reached 3000 boats per year.

== See also ==
- Communes of the Tarn-et-Garonne department
