= Huissier =

Ceremonial offices in France and Switzerland

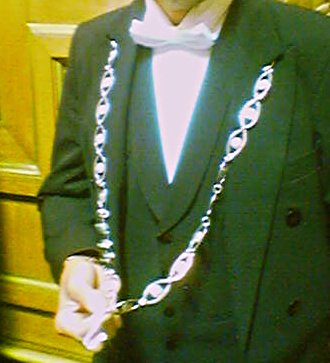
The chain of a huissier in the French Senate. Note also the formal collar and morning suit.

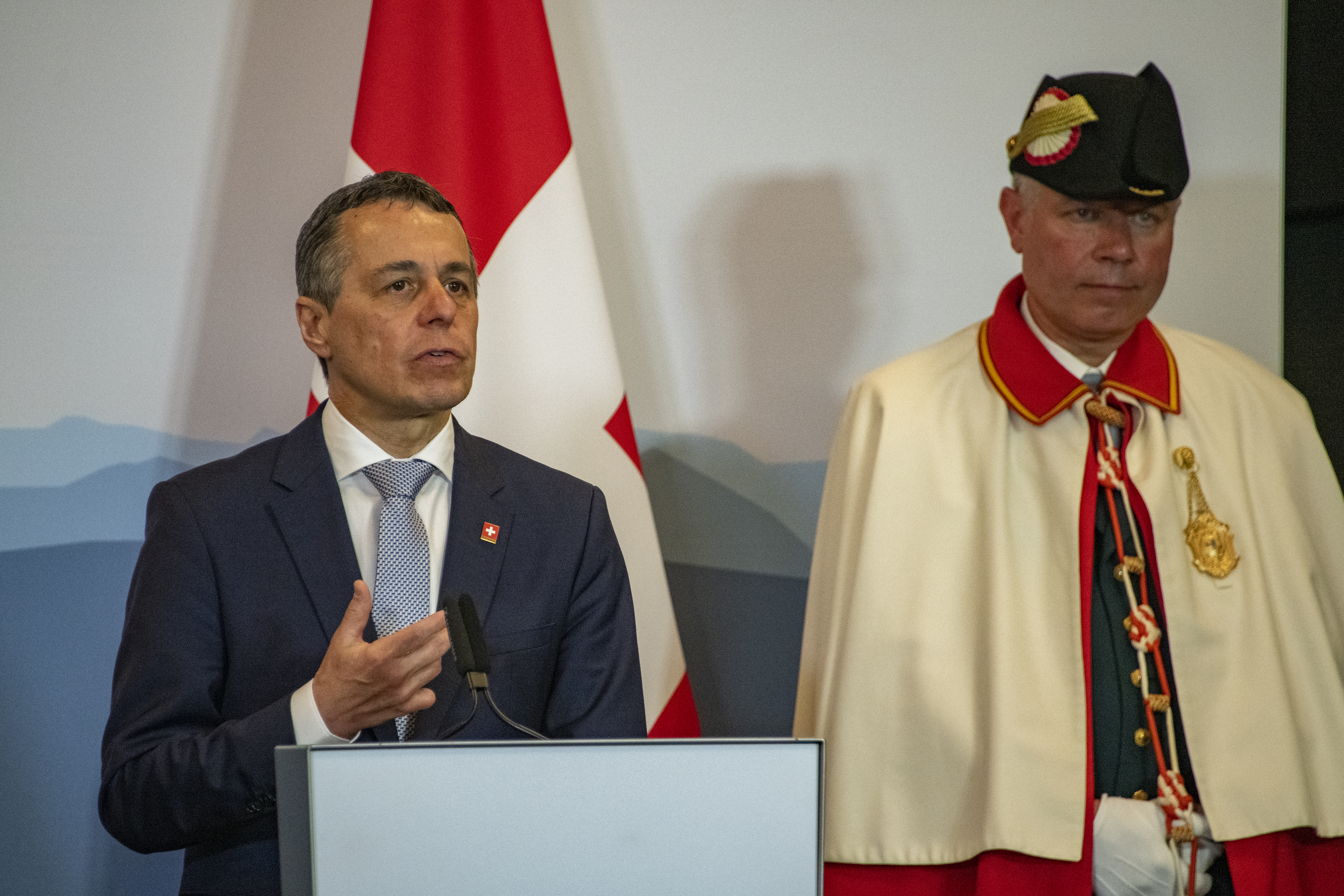
Swiss Federal Councillor Ignazio Cassis speaks in 2019 accompanied by a Bundesweibel

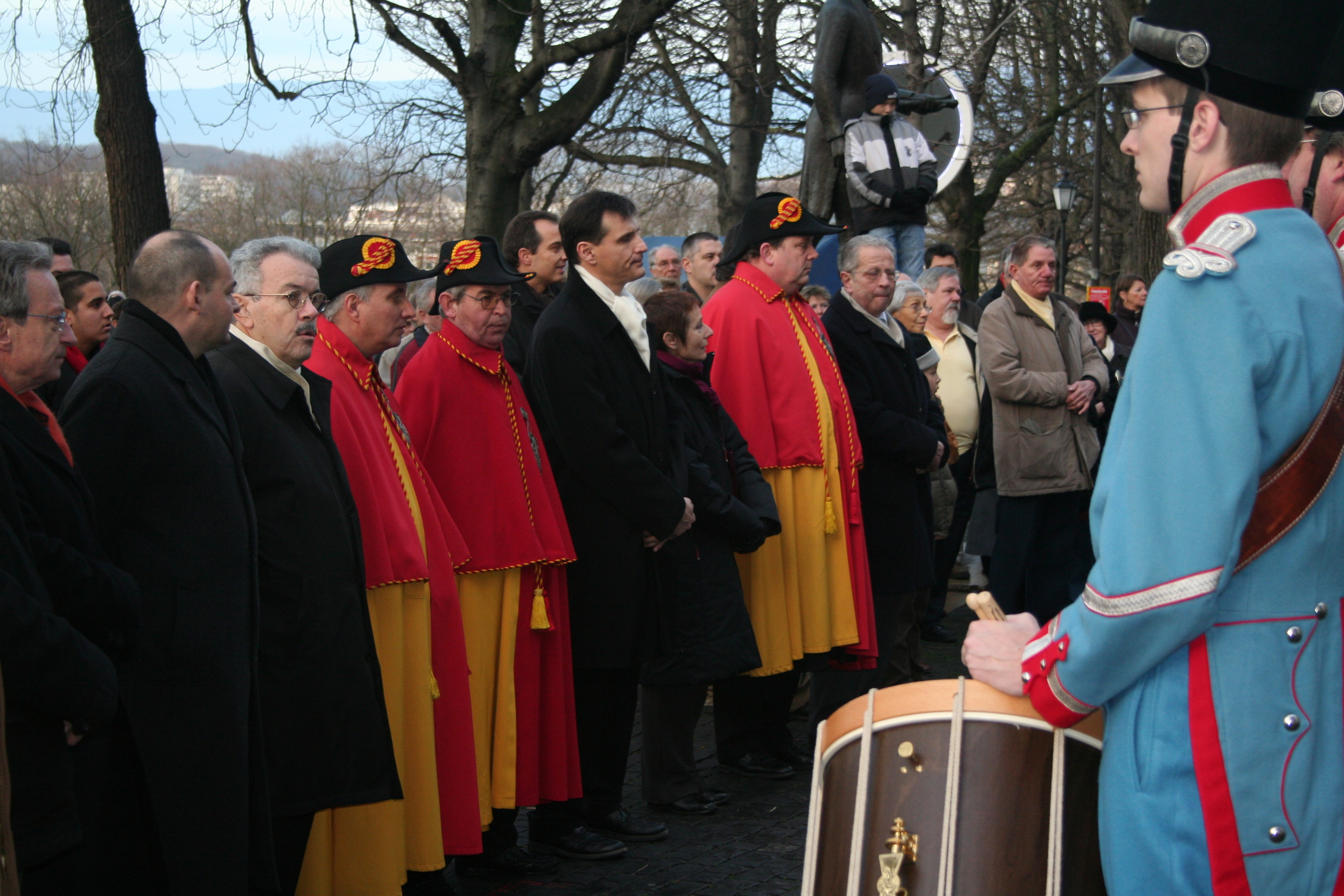
The cantonal government of Geneva with three Standesweibel at an official function commemorating the Restoration (2006 photograph)

The French word huissier ("doorman", from huis, an archaic term for a door) designates ceremonial offices in France and Switzerland.

== France ==
In French government ministries and Parliament, a huissier is an employee who provides general service to the minister or assembly (transmitting messages, handling ballot boxes, etc.). Traditionally, they wear a chain around the neck, because their original function was to lock and unlock doors.

Before the Revolution, the title could be a court office in the household of royalty, as a type of valet de chambre.

== Switzerland ==
In Switzerland, huissier is the French equivalent of German Weibel (also Amtsweibel), the term for a ceremonial office in Swiss cantonal and federal governments, parliaments, and courts of law. At the federal level, the office is known as Bundesweibel, at the cantonal level as Standesweibel for governments, Ratsweibel for parliaments and Gerichtsweibel for courts of law. Some cities also have office at the communal level (Stadtweibel).

Swiss huissiers in their official capacities wear ceremonial robes with the heraldic colours of the entity they represent, Bundesweibel in red and white, cantonal Weibel in cantonal colours (Standesfarben).

== See also ==
- Aegis
- Huissier de justice
- Necklet
- Chain of office
- Doorman
- Footman
- Usher
- Hospitality
- Protocol (diplomacy)
- Meet and Greet
