= Battle of Pampeluna =

Battle of the Italian War of 1521–1526

- Part of the War of the Holy League
- In red, the lands of Navarre occupied by Spain. In pink, the remaining Kingdom of Navarre.
Date	20 May 1521
Location	Pamplona, Spain
Result	Navarrese-French victory
Territorial changes	Navarre reconquered from Spain

Belligerents
Kingdom of Spain	Kingdom of France; Kingdom of Navarre

Commanders and leaders
Antonio Manrique de Lara; Francisco de Herrera	André de Foix

Strength
280	12,000 men

Casualties and losses
low	low

The Battle of Pampluna or Battle of Pamplona was a battle fought during the Italian War of 1521–1526 on 20 May 1521 during which forces led by the Kingdom of Navarre with support from France conquered the Fortress of Pamplona from Spain. The battle coincided with an uprising by a part of the Navarrese population and the swift reconquest of all of Navarre from the Spanish.

After sustaining a cannonball wound from the Navarrese-French assault, Ignatius of Loyola experienced a spiritual conversion, going on to found the Society of Jesus (Jesuit Order) in 1540.

== Battle ==
Spain had conquered Iberian Navarre in 1512, including the capital Pamplona. Former King Henry II of Navarre obtained the support of King Francis I of France to recover his Kingdom. In 1520, the Crown of Castile seemed weakened by the internal Revolt of the Comuneros, and the Navarrese and French decided to take advantage of this weakness. However, the reconquest began only in May 1521, when most of the Comuneros had already been neutralised.

As prepared, a general uprising took place throughout Navarre, including in the city of Pamplona. At the same time, French troops commanded by André de Foix Lord of Lesparre, made up of 12,000 infantry with heavy artillery, crossed the Pyrenees. They easily took Saint-Jean-Pied-de-Port on 15 May, then Roncesvalles and Burguete.

When the population of Pamplona rose up, the Viceroy of Navarre, Antonio Manrique de Lara, 2nd Duke of Nájera fled the city on 17 May for Alfaro, La Rioja, being assaulted on the way and robbed. The few Castilian soldiers who remained entrenched themselves in the fortress of Pamplona. When the French arrived on 20 May, they bombarded the fortress for six hours, after which it surrendered.

Among the Spanish occupants was the Basque captain Íñigo López de Loyola (who later took the religious name of Ignatius), who was wounded at both legs during the bombardment. Among the attackers were Francis Xavier's two brothers, Miguel and Juan, who would remain in charge of the city.

The recovery of the Kingdom had not been very bloody. There were further clashes with some 1,000 Basques on Mount Zengarrén, which left some 17 dead and then another 4 dead in Yesa. Nor was there any subsequent retaliation against collaborators with the Spanish.

== Aftermath ==
The reaction of the Spanish was very swift. An army of 30,000 well-equipped men was raised, including many of the defeated Communards who enlisted to redeem their sentence. Helped by errors of General Lesparre, who went with the bulk of his troops to besiege Logrono, without securing the recovery of the Kingdom, the Spanish decisively defeated the Navarrese and French in the Battle of Noáin on 30 June 1521.

The Spanish troops would recover control over Pamplona and the rest of Iberian Navarre in July.

While recovering from injuries sustained during the battle, Íñigo López de Loyola (later taking the name Ignatius) underwent a religious conversion that led him to write Spiritual Exercises and later found the Jesuits.

== Sources ==
- Histoire de la Réunion de la Navarre à la Castille, page 544-549
- Pedro Esarte Muniain, Navarra, 1512-1530, ISBN 84-7681-340-6
- Britannica, Battle of Pamplona
