= Spanish conquest of Iberian Navarre =

Wars over Navarre in Iberia (1512–1529)

Coordinates: 42.8183°N 1.6442°W

Conquest of Navarre
- Part of the War of the Holy League
- In red, the lands of Navarre occupied by Ferdinand. In pink, the remaining Kingdom of Navarre which survived until Louis XIII.
Date	1512−1529
Location	Kingdom of Navarre
Result	Castilian-Aragonese victory
Territorial changes	Iberian Navarre annexed to Castile

Belligerents
Crown of Castile; Crown of Aragon	Kingdom of Navarre; France (from 1521)

Commanders and leaders
King Ferdinand II; Duke of Alba; Charles V, Holy Roman Emperor; Duke of Nájera	King John III; Henry II of Navarre; Pedro, Marshal of Navarre; André de Foix; Cesare Borgia

The Spanish conquest of the Iberian part of the Kingdom of Navarre was initiated by King Ferdinand II of Aragon and completed by his grandson and successor Holy Roman Emperor Charles V in a series of military campaigns lasting from 1512 to 1529. Ferdinand was both the king of Aragon and regent of Castile in 1512. When Pope Julius II declared a Holy League against France in late 1511, Navarre attempted to remain neutral. Ferdinand used this as an excuse to attack Navarre, conquering it while its potential protector, France, was beset by England, Venice, and Ferdinand's own Italian armies.

Several attempts were made to reconquer Iberian Navarre immediately following the Castilian invasion. There was a half-hearted attempt in 1516 and a full-fledged Franco-Navarrese campaign in 1521. All attempts were defeated by the Spanish and clashes came to a halt in 1528, when Spanish troops withdrew from Lower Navarre north of the Pyrenees. The Treaty of Cambrai between Spain and France in 1529 sealed the division of Navarre along the Pyrenees.

The portion annexed by Castile also came to be known as Upper Navarre, while the portion north of the Pyrenees, also called Lower Navarre, remained an independent kingdom, ruled by the House of Albret, and maintained close links with France. The kingdom was in personal union with France after 1589 and absorbed into France in 1620. It ceased to exist as an administrative division in 1790. Upper Navarre lost its status as a kingdom at the end of the First Carlist War.

== Background ==
=== External intervention in internal affairs ===
Civil War, external intervention, and territorial loss (1463)

Navarre had been mired in instability over the throne since the mid-15th century, with Navarre's nobility splitting into two warring factions in the War of the Bands, i.e. the Beaumonts and the Agramonts. This caused ramifications in the Basque Country both within and out of Navarre, and made it susceptible to external meddling. In 1461, Navarre was invaded by Castilian troops, resulting in the territorial loss of the Sonsierra, as well as several strongholds, to the Castilians. Starting in 1474, Ferdinand II of Aragon instituted a combination of alliances and military efforts aimed at securing the control of neighbouring kingdoms. This included turning Navarre into a de facto protectorate of Castile in 1476. Ambitions over Navarre also came from north of the Pyrenees—the Count John of Foix had aspirations on its crown, based on Salic Law alien to Navarre.

The crown, effectively led by Magdalena of France, Princess of Viana, attempted a difficult diplomatic balance since 1483. For its part, King Ferdinand II looked among the magnates of Navarre for allies, finding it in Louis of Beaumont, Count of Lerin, who demanded to rule over Los Arcos and Laguardia. He also managed to buy the services of the viceroy Peter of Foix to have the young Queen Catherine married to John, prince of Castile-Aragon. Magdalena discovered the arrangement, removing Peter from office. Finally, an arrangement with Alain of Albret paved the road for the young Gascon noble John's accession to the throne of Navarre in February 1484, thwarting again the Aragonese king's plans. However, many in Navarre contested the marriage.

In 1488, Alain of Albret aspired to marry Anne of Brittany, supporting in turn an alliance with Castile-Aragon, England, and Burgundy against Charles VIII. In March that year, Alain signed the Treaties of Valencia with Ferdinand, including military agreements for the defense of Navarre against France, and recognition of Bearn as sovereign. An understanding of Magdalena with Ferdinand, by which the Navarrese monarchs' first-born Anne would marry John, Prince of Asturias, or any grandson by Ferdinand and Isabella, led to the coronation in Pamplona of Catherine and John in 1494. However, the Count of Lerin would not accept the agreement, prompting a revolt. The crown was now resolute to crush him and other rebellious earls once and for all, but needed to secure the control of all fortresses in the kingdom for the purpose.

Bearn offered a contingent of 1,000 archers, but Ferdinand warned against military support from the Pyrenean principality. The Navarrese monarchs in turn could not subdue the rebellious count, who remained in possession of several strongholds, and under Castilian control. However, by early 1495 the crown had managed to expel him from the kingdom, gain control of a number of strongholds, obtain the complete endorsement of the Courts of Navarre, as well as the allegiance of an important number of Beaumot supporters. Meanwhile, the appointment of Antonio Pallavicini as bishop of Pamplona became another point of contention with Rome, as it did not count with the approval of the Navarrese monarchs. The accession of Louis XII to the throne of France in April 1498 ignited mutual hostility. Alain of Albret attempted to ease up relations by supporting Louis XII's ambitions to marry Anne of Brittany, as well as offering Carlota of Albret to the pope Alexander VI as a bride for Cesare Borgia. The ensuing peace treaties between the crowns of Navarre, France, and Castile-Aragon inaugurated a 4-year-period of stability for the kingdom.

=== Count of Lerín defeated and ensuing peace ===
After Isabella's death in 1504, Ferdinand unexpectedly married the French princess Germaine of Foix, daughter of a claimant to the throne of Navarre John of Foix, Viscount of Narbonne. Any children from Ferdinand's marriage would have a claim on the crown of Navarre. Ferdinand also wanted to spite his son-in-law and successor Philip, the new King of Castile. The monarchs Catherine and John opted to support Philip after the expulsion of Ferdinand II from Castilian politics in July 1506, resulting in the Treaty of Tudela de Duero. This move empowered the Navarrese crown, but alienated them from Louis XII. On the other hand, they earned the support of Emperor Maximilian, especially against France, and the pope.

As of 1507, with Ferdinand again administering the politics of Castile as a regent, the defiant count of Lerín Louis Beaumont, Ferdinand's key ally in Navarre, revolted along with other lords. However, the royal authority—Catherine and John III—warned Ferdinand that this time no demands from the count would be accepted and no pardon would be granted to the Count of Lerín. A faction of the Castilian nobility started to reach out to the Navarrese monarchs against Ferdinand II after Philip's death. However, they remained cautious.

It was in 1507, during the siege of Viana, that the condottiero Cesare Borgia, an agent of Maximilian then in the service of John, was killed by Beaumont knights. In 1508, after a year-long stand-off, the crown launched an offensive to quell the Count's rebellion. Lerín was occupied, and a severe defeat inflicted on Louis.The count's defeat inaugurated a (short) period of peace and stability for the kingdom; the Courts of Navarre unanimously put an end to the Brotherhood of Navarre in early 1510 on the grounds that "regular justice is well established, which suffices to keep the kingdom in peace"; the Brotherhood, founded in 1488, aimed at a more effective implementation of justice and persecution of crime within Navarre.

=== King Louis XII's ambitions ===
Relations between Ferdinand and King Louis XII improved after the former's marriage to Germaine of Foix. The French king put pressure on the Albrets to give up on their principalities outside Navarre—Béarn, Bigorre, County of Foix, etc.—but was met with their strong refusal. In 1507 the Parliament of Navarre appointed a diplomatic task force to France led by John of Jaso—president of the Royal Council of Navarre and father of Francis Xavier—and the bishop of Lescar. The effort was weak, as were other diplomatic approaches.

Louis XII coveted the Albrets' territories and resorted to the Parliament of Toulouse, which issued a confiscation decree. When the Courts of Navarre (The Three States) and the States-General of Béarn were confronted with the possibility of a French takeover in 1510, a military mobilization was decreed and a bill passed to create a Béarn-Navarre confederation and a permanent joint defense provision against external assault. Ferdinand II again searched for allies among the Navarrese Beaumont party.

=== Preparation for the invasion ===
In summer 1510 the international scene took a sharp turn in the Italian Wars. Pope Julius II was one of the most ambitious Popes of the era. He had declared a Holy League against Venice in 1508, and defeated it. Then the formerly allied Papal States and France went to war with one another. Julius II declared a new Holy League against France on 4 August 1511 after siding with King Ferdinand in the French-Spanish struggle for power in Italy. Navarre refused to join and declared neutrality. Ferdinand II declared war on France in March 1512. A month later, Gaston of Foix died, meaning that Ferdinand's wife Germaine of Foix was able to claim the Pyrenean territories of the Albrets.

King Louis became more conciliatory with Queen Catherine and King John III, backing down on his territorial demands. Catherine and John III negotiated with Ferdinand too, who intertwined proposals and menaces with the movement of troops to the borders of Navarre. In February 1512, Ferdinand allied with England in a move leading to military intervention in the French royal territory of Guyenne, present-day region Aquitaine. The Navarrese authorities made arrangements for the defense, while Ferdinand designed a plan to invade the kingdom. This included a propaganda scheme in which the Navarrese crown would be labeled as schismatic with the support of a papal bull from Pope Julius. To obtain papal agreement to this, Castilian diplomats negotiated with Rome for months.

== Castilian-Aragonese invasion of 1512 ==
=== Invasion of Navarre ===
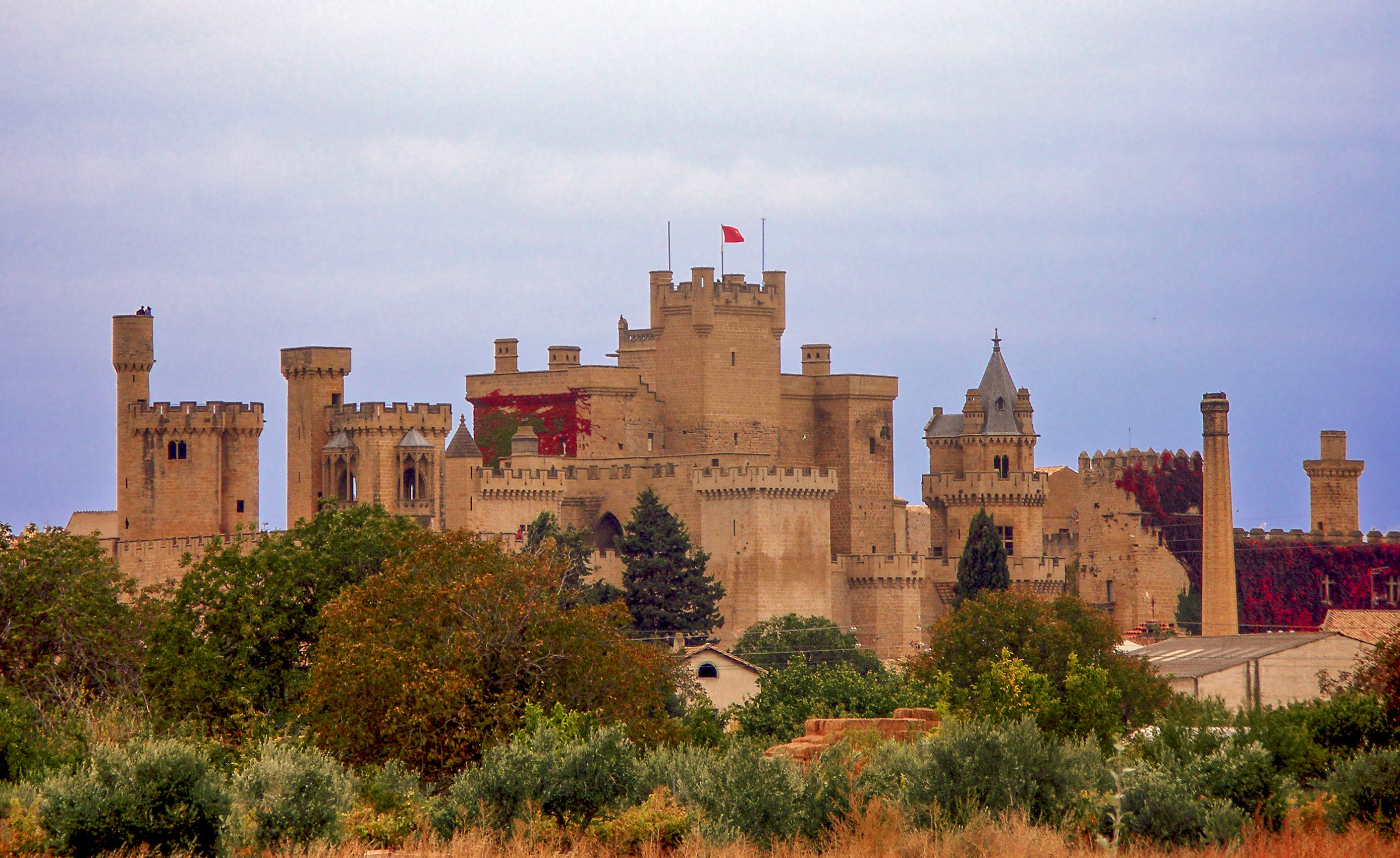
Castle of Olite, a major fortification and royal site (central Navarre)

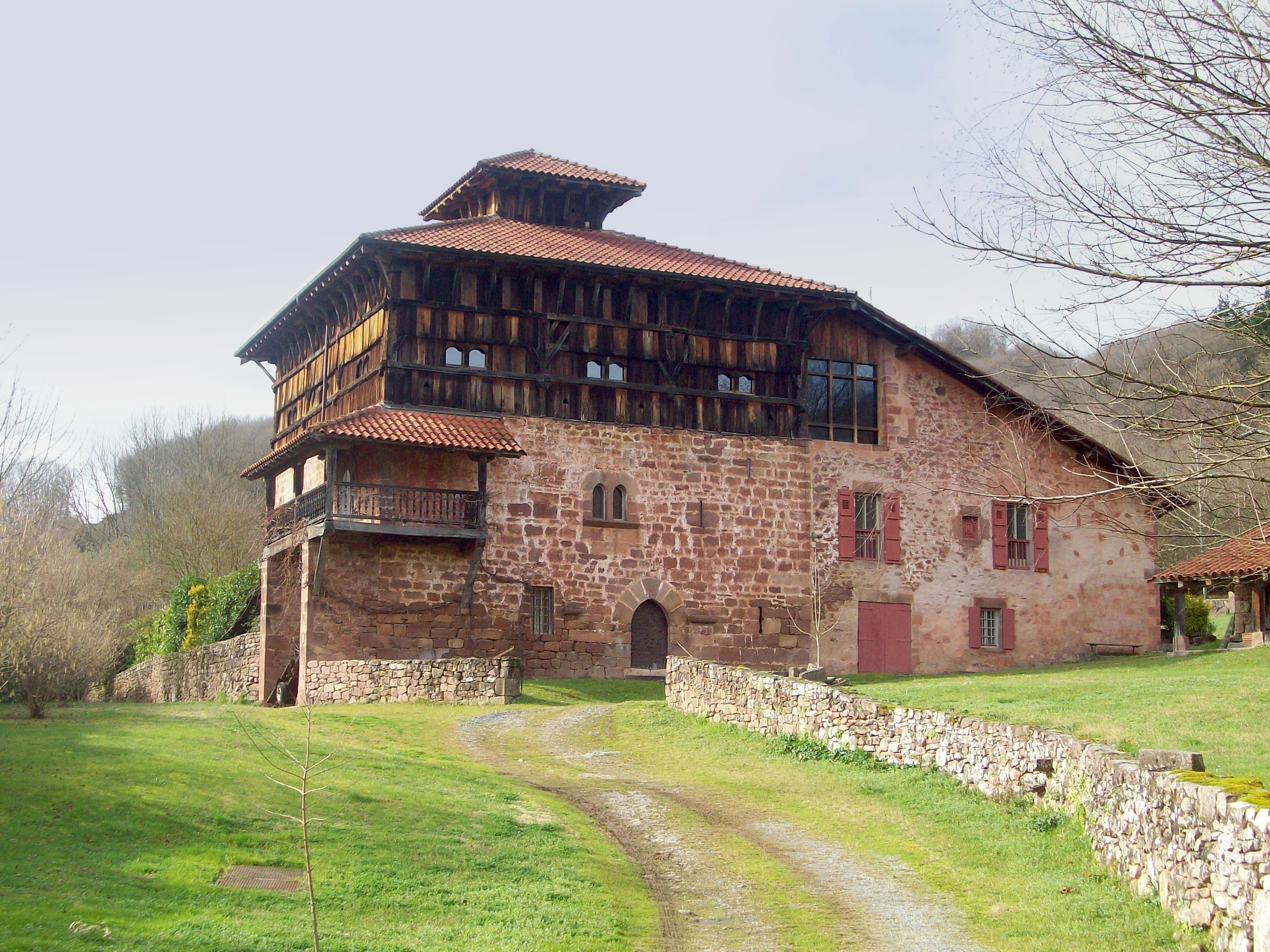
Jauregizarre, a 16th-century tower house north of Navarre, home to the Ursua, a clan of notaries

In June 1512, tension mounted when the Holy League made a formal petition to send English and Castilian troops through Navarre to France. At the same time a Navarrese diplomatic mission sent to France was holding talks with Louis XII lasting a month, while Ferdinand threatened to cross the border if an agreement was reached. The talks led to the Fourth Treaty of Blois on 18 July 1512, providing for mutual assistance to keep Navarre's neutrality. It also brought attention to the English threat to France after their disembarkation in Hondarribia, Gipuzkoa in Basque territory suzerain to Castile. The next day Ferdinand sent his troops across the border from Álava into Navarre, commanded by General Don Fadrique de Toledo, Duke of Alba, who had been involved in the conquest of Granada. By that time a Gipuzkoan militia had broken into Navarre from the north-west and captured Goizueta, a village and fortress bordering on Gipuzkoa on 10 July.

In a few days Castilian troops advanced without resistance to the outskirts of Pamplona, where Ferdinand's ally Count Louis of Beaumont played host to the invading troops in his fortified palace of Arazuri. The assault troops of the expedition numbered 6,000 veterans, but the whole caravan including the rearguard amounted to 15,000. The population of Pamplona was less than 10,000. Catherine and John III left for Tudela hoping to raise troops among loyal lords, but managed to recruit only 500. Overwhelmed by the sheer size of the Spanish expedition, the loyalists veered east to Lumbier (Irunberri), and on to Lower Navarre. Catherine, John III, and their troops retreated to Orthez, Béarn.

Pamplona's outer walls were flimsy, and the threat of a sack pronounced by the Duke of Alba loomed over the town. In view of the royal family's retreat to Lumbier, the local authorities surrendered on 25 July. Without delay, messengers were sent out by the Castilians to the main fortresses across Navarre demanding that they follow suit. Most of them submitted, except for Amaiur (Baztan), Estella-Lizarra, Tudela, and Saint-Jean-Pied-de-Port. The authorities of Pamplona were required to vow loyalty to Ferdinand, but they alleged that they could not as they had pledged allegiance to John III, their natural lord, and he was alive. In late August 1512 Ferdinand claimed that he was King of Navarre in law: de jure propio.

Tudela in turn was besieged, and resisted the Aragonese assault led by Alfonso of Aragon, a bastard son of Ferdinand II and archbishop of Zaragoza, who was commanding 3,000 infantry and 300 cavalry. The determined loyalty of the local authorities to the Navarrese crown could not hide their low morale on account of the Pope's bull and the hopelessness of their resistance, as set down on letters to the King by the defenders. The town surrendered by 9 September 1512 in order to avoid being sacked, further confiscations, and futile bloodshed. Alfonso took an oath to respect the Navarrese laws, following his father Ferdinand's instructions.

=== Castilian-Aragonese control of the kingdom ===
By late August 1512, virtually all Iberian Navarre was under Spanish rule. The Duke of Alba, commanding a force of 3,000 infantry and 300 cavalry supported by a further 400 artillerymen, occupied the Pyrenean valleys of Aezkoa, Salazar, and Roncal. They crossed the Pyrenean passes northbound, taking the Chapel of Roncevaux by surprise, and setting fire to the village. The Castilian forces spearheaded by Colonel Villalba (or the Beaumont party lord Martin of Ursua, depending on sources) arrived in Saint-Jean-Pied-de-Port on 10 September, only to find that its garrison under the lord of Miossens (an Albret) was abandoning the stronghold. The Castilian forces set about pillaging, burning, and terrorising the villages of Lower Navarre, a tactic the Castilian commander tried to justify in his letters. The Church appears to have approved of the subjugation of the Navarrese population.

The Castilians demanded the submission of all the lords in Lower Navarre (Ultrapuertos, Deça-Ports), while the Duke of Alba ordered the pulling down of all the tower houses in the territory. The orchards in the Saint-Jean-Pied-de-Port (Donibane Garazi in Basque) area were cut down, leaving the local population struggling for subsistence. At this point, Ferdinand demanded a capitulation of Catherine and John III, but offered to negotiate their hold on the throne on condition that they sent their heir apparent Henry to be raised in the court of Castile. The demand was met with a flat refusal.

Meanwhile, a French army was stationed in Bayonne (Labourd, in Guyenne) guarding against possible English or Castilian moves. Ferdinand still planned to invade Guyenne, home to both Albrets' possessions and French royal lands, or at least Bayonne, a strategic port for Navarre. However, time was running out for the Castilians in Lower Navarre, short of food and supplies, and under adverse weather conditions. 1,000 discontented veteran troops in Saint-Jean-Pied-de-Port mutinied. The Duke of Alba negotiated their removal to the less hostile area of Burgui and Salazar, breaking up the uprising.

=== Navarrese counterattack ===
The images of the cannons and king were removed from the coat of arms of Gipuzkoa (1979) as a gesture of friendship with Navarre

Coat of arms of King Ferdinand II of Aragon as of 1513, with Navarre added

By mid-October, John III had raised an army of 15,000 Navarrese, Gascons, and landsknechts ready to counterattack. Three columns advanced into Gipuzkoa and the heartland of Navarre. The first laid siege to Hondarribia and San Sebastián, and occupied a number of small towns of the area. This was to divert the attention of any Castilian relief attempt for the besieged troops in Pamplona. By then, tired of Ferdinand II's unreliability, the English had decided to leave the theatre of war, after sacking a number of villages and towns (Errenteria). The second column, commanded by the Duke of Longueville, was made up of 8,000 Gascons, 1,000 Navarrese, 1,500 landsknechts, and corresponding artillery. It set off from Peyrehorade, engaged the Castilians in Ainhize, and defeated them on 19 October.

The third column crossed the Pyrenees from Roncal (Erronkari) and reached Burgui. Fearful of having his communications with Pamplona cut, the Duke of Alba withdrew to the capital, leaving a well-equipped garrison in Saint-Jean-Pied-de-Port. The Navarrese column advanced from Salazar towards Pamplona. On hearing the news of the Navarrese army's approach, Estella-Lizarra and the fortress of Monjardin next to it revolted against the occupiers. On 24 October 1512, the Duke of Alba reached Pamplona, followed by Navarrese loyalist forces, who laid siege to the capital.

In Estella-Lizarra, the Navaresse led by John Ramirez de Baquedano and Jaime Vélaz de Medrano y Echauz were soon opposed by the forces of Pedro de Beaumont, supported by the Castilians the Duke of Nájera and the Marquis of Comares. The Navarrese leaders made a last stand at the Monjardin fortress under the control of Juan Vélaz de Medrano y Echauz, but eventually a capitulation was signed. The investment of Pamplona lasted for a month, but the coming of winter and the arrival of reinforcements from Castile thwarted any prospects of a successful conclusion to the operation. The loyalists retreated and the Castilian troops made their way back across the Pyrenees to Saint-Jean-Pied-de-Port and Lower Navarre, engaging in regular skirmishes with the disgruntled Beaumont party Lord of Luxe.

On 7 December 1512, a detachment of the Navarrese army's decimated landsknechts who were escorting twelve artillery pieces when they encountered a patrol led by the governor of Gipuzkoa Juan de Silva at the Belate pass. The Gipuzkoan militia took on the landsknechts, who retreated in disarray, and were pursued and largely slaughtered. The skirmish was later exaggerated to a wholesale battle, with the cannons seized being added in 1513 to the official coat of arms of Gipuzkoa.

=== Spanish reoccupation and aftermath ===
As of December 1512, the clashes were confined to Saint-Jean-Pied-de-Port and its hinterland, still occupied by the Castilians. Between 13 and 23 March 1513 the Parliament of Navarre, reduced to the Beaumount party representatives who had sided with the Castilian conquest, was called and accepted Ferdinand as their "natural lord and king." Ferdinand in turn agreed to keep Navarrese institutions and identity. At the same time, the first Castilian viceroy, Diego Fernández de Córdoba, took an oath to respect Navarrese law, known as the fueros.

Initially the kingdom was attached to Ferdinand—and therefore to the Crown of Aragon—as an earned good, falling back on the Papal bulls. Aragon was a Pyrenean realm with a similar confederate institutional make-up, as opposed to the authoritarian Castile. Castilian pressure resulted in the bequeathing of Navarre to Castilian Queen Isabella's daughter, Joanna of Castile, and annexing the Basque kingdom to Castile in 1515. On 11 June 1515 the Cortes of Burgos met. It was not attended by any Navarrese representatives. Even the Navarrese count of Lerin Louis of Beaumont, Ferdinand II's accomplice up to that point, protested at this annexation to Castile, and was incarcerated. The annexation was confirmed by Ferdinand on 7 July, taking an oath to respect Navarre's laws and institutions, the pactum subjectionis, simultaneously assigning to the Royal Council of Castile the attributions to rule and administer justice on the matters affecting Navarre.

Castile and Navarre had different institutional and legal systems, and dissimilar social and ethnic make-ups. Once the Castilian and Aragonese military confirmed their occupation of all the strongholds, the ground was paved for a progressive institutional takeover marked by the centralizing drive of the Spanish-Castilian Crown. This was the source of frequent frictions and tensions. The diplomat and writer Niccolò Machiavelli anticipated a prompt and easy understanding by Ferdinand II with France "on the only condition of keeping Navarre, giving up instead the Duchy of Milan for its vicinity to the Helvetians."

== Construction of the case for the conquest ==
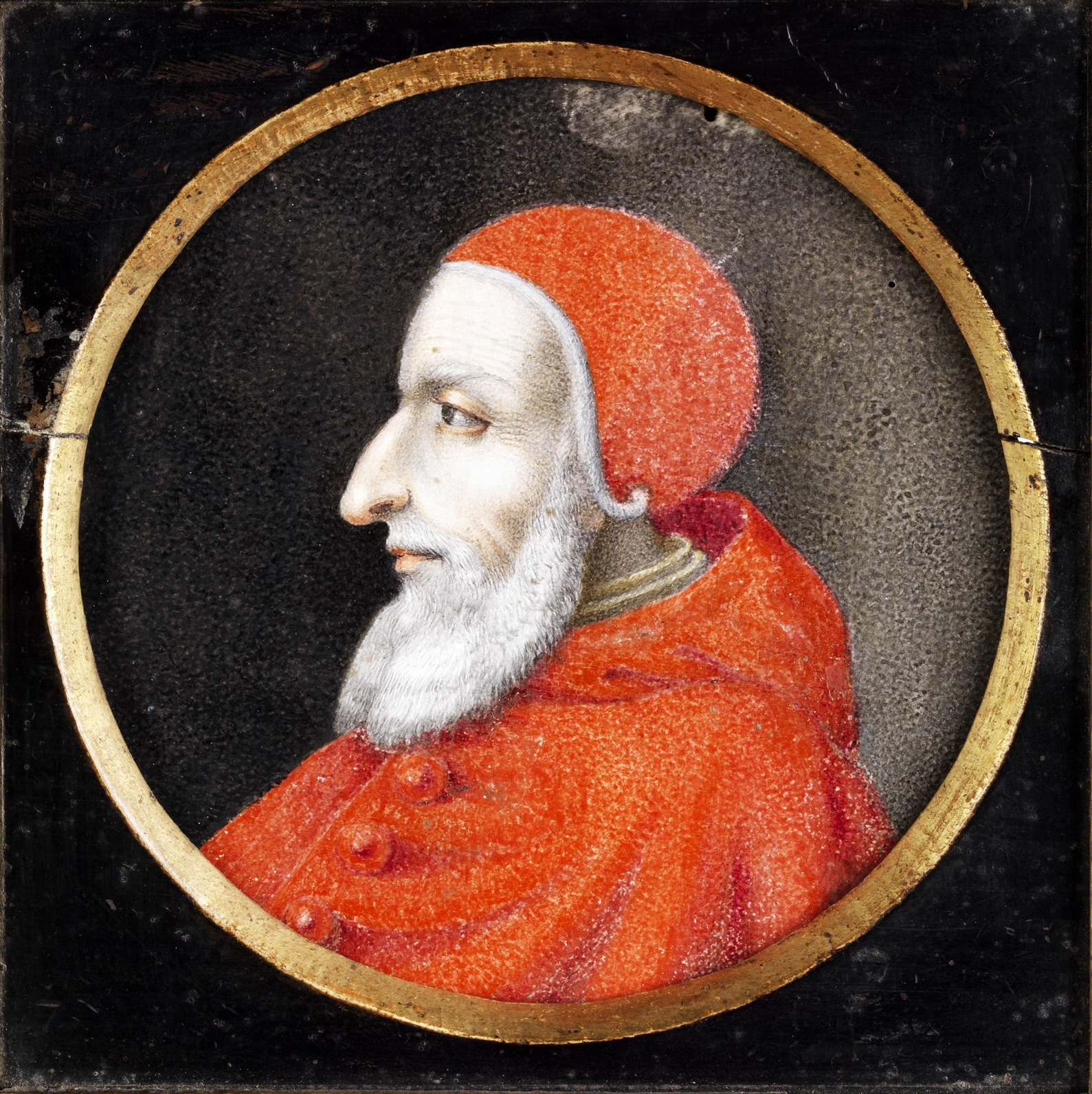
Pope Julius II, died in the wake of his Pastor Ille Caelestis bull, written at the Chancery of Aragon in Rome

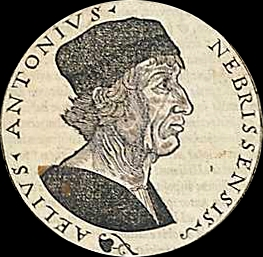
Antonio de Nebrija, an able scholar at the service of Ferdinand II of Aragon and Isabella I of Castile

=== Legal claims ===
Ferdinand wished to present his military intervention as legally justified. He commissioned a report by the legal specialists Antonio de Nebrija and Juan López de Palacios Rubios in order to make the case for his actions with a wide range of claims over the Basque kingdom. During the following decades and centuries these reports were to become a reference point for debates on the morality of the Spanish conquest. Both scholars were acting as servants of their masters King Ferdinand II and the Duke of Alba when they accepted these propaganda assignments, as pointed out by the historian Alfredo Floristan. López de Palacios would later develop the doctrine legitimizing the Spanish conquest of the West Indies.

In late August 1512, once the conquest of the heartland of Navarre was completed, Ferdinand issued a statement defending his right to attack Navarre according to the iure belli or "fair war" doctrine passed by the Roman Church in 1511. With Pamplona on his hands and the royal family in Béarn, Ferdinand further justified his claim on the Crown of Navarre by de iure propio, entitlement in his own right. Another claim involved a so-called "right of way" across Navarre in order to achieve military goals in Guyenne, supported by Ferdinand's divine right as a king. Ferdinand also claimed that he was "observing international treaties" by invading Navarre in order to help his ally England.

An additional claim was that the Navarrese lineage starting with Iñigo Arista (824–851) was an usurpation of the rightful Castilian claimant, the alleged heir to the Visigothic Kingdom via the Kingdom of Asturias, the Visigoths being the holders of Roman Emperor Honorius' mandate for Hispania. Lastly, Ferdinand advanced a number of claims to the Navarrese throne related to his marriage to Germaine of Foix, and to his father John II of Aragon.

=== Pope's intervention ===
Ferdinand was informed by spies of the progress of the negotiations between Navarrese diplomats and Louis XII at Blois. On the eve of the invasion, 17 July 1512, Ferdinand had a forged draft copy of the Treaty of Blois, signed on 18 July, circulated. This aimed to smear both parties. The Papal ruling Pastor Ille Caelestis issued on 21 July, just three days after the start of the invasion, authorized Ferdinand to wage war on Church enemies and to claim their lands and subjects providing they lie outside Italy, which would apply to Louis XII's France and the "heretic" crown of Navarre. This provision was added at the instigation of Ferdinand in December 1511.

On 5 June 1512, Ferdinand had addressed a letter to the Pope Julius II urging him to issue a bull excommunicating "everyone in the kingdom of Navarre and the principality of Béarn" and allocating him Navarre, or failing that, the right to take it over, and appealing to the Pope's own interests in Spain. "You just need a scroll and ink" he added. On 7 June 1512 Ferdinand addressed another letter to his ambassador in Rome urging him to secure the bulls as soon as possible, for "our army is up and the artillery ready" to invade Navarre.

However, the Navarrese crown was not cited explicitly in the Pastor Ille Caelestis bull. Echoing Ferdinand's claim in late August 1512, the Exigit Contumatium Papal bull was issued half a year later, on 18 February 1513. Catherine and John III were labelled as schismatic and therefore unworthy holders of the royal title, excommunicating them and confiscating their properties. The members of the Parliament of Navarre attending the session held in Pamplona on 13–24 March 1513 accepted Ferdinand II as king.

While the ambition to conquer kingdoms is absolutely not without fault, as the kings should rather protect their borders instead of invading foreign ones, however, it sometimes happens that they are compelled by necessity to undertake an evidently necessary war, which would otherwise be unfair (...), but since it would be worse that the wicked prevail over the righteous, very appropriately that necessity makes most rightful an otherwise unfair case
Antonio de Nebrija. 1545 (posth.). De bello Navariense.

=== New order built over former structures ===
Despite the papal support to his actions, Ferdinand—and his successors— was haunted by allegations of tyranny and usurpation, and these concerns were to leave an imprint in the status of Navarre after the invasion. Ferdinand arranged to present the invasion as a mere dynastic change, attempting to conceal the fact of the military takeover. Despite Navarre being considered an "earned good" for the free disposition of Ferdinand, the pactum subjections was applied—taking an oath to respect the Navarrese law and identity.

Navarre was no Granada, which was considered not only a legitimate conquest by Roman Catholic standards but a "reconquest" of the Visigoth Kingdom. On the other side, Navarre was widely held to be an old Christian kingdom, with secular institutions and an entrenched identification of its population with the native social order. Prior in tempore, potior in iure, or "earlier in time, stronger in law": the kingdom was stronger than the crown itself.

== 1516 reconquest attempt ==
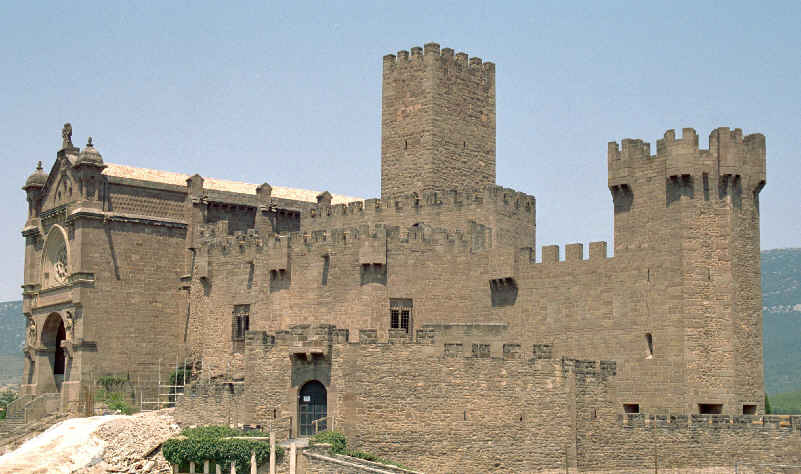
The Castle of Xavier, home to John of Jaso, was partially demolished on orders of Cardinal Cisneros

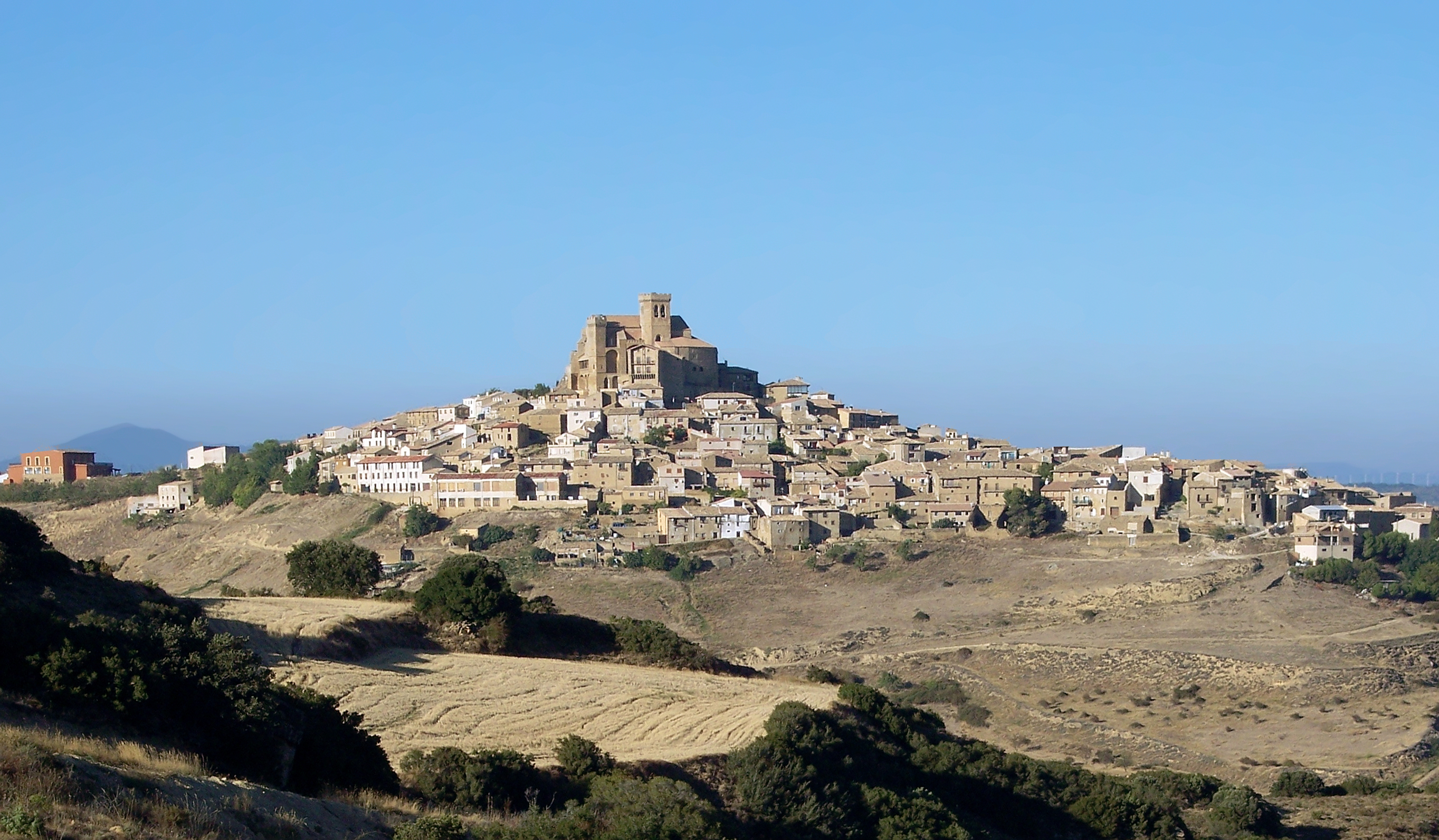
Uxue (central Navarre), featuring a fortification spared thanks to an attached religious site

=== Reconquest opportunity on Ferdinand's death ===
By 1516 Ferdinand was dead and his sixteen-year-old grandson by Isabella, Charles of Austria, had ascended to the throne of both Castile and Aragon. However, in 1516 he still lived in the Burgundian Netherlands. John III of Navarre saw an opportunity to reconquer Iberian Navarre. He raised an army in Sauveterre-de-Bearn made up of two columns, one commanded by himself and the other by Pedro, Marshal of Navarre. This small army aimed at reaching Sanguesa and Lumbier, and there inciting an uprising against the Castilians.

The first column led by John III failed to overcome the Castilian garrison occupying St-Jean-Pied-de-Port, while the second was no more successful. Pedro advanced towards Roncevaux on 12 March 1516, but Cardinal Cisneros had been informed of the Navarrese intentions and had Colonel Villalba awaiting him at Roncevaux.

Pedro in turn decided to avoid Roncevaux by way of Salazar and Roncal, but weather and the little sympathy shown by the local population (except for Roncal) eroded the 600-strong column. The column was engaged in battle and defeated by Colonel Villalba near Isaba, in the valley of Roncal, and the survivors taken prisoner. Pedro was assassinated years later while in custody at Simancas, although it was presented as a suicide.

=== Failed expedition ===
Among the captured were several lords, including Valentin of Jaso, cousin of Francis Xavier. The prisoners were taken to Atienza and held in chains with restricted communications. Extreme security measures were taken and no Navarrese were allowed into the town, with any resident hosting a Navarrese or not reporting their presence being subject to a 1,000 maravedi fine and two years imprisonment. The surviving 7 Navarrese Agramont lords were eventually released on acceptance of their submission, but they all joined the 1521 French-Navarrese expedition commanded by General Asparros.

The reconquest attempt failed, and on 14 August 1516 the Treaty of Noyon was signed between Francis I of France and Charles V, in which Charles agreed in the context of a wider agreement to reconsider his rights over the Kingdom of Navarre and listen to Queen Catherine's envoys. However, Franco-Spanish tensions mounted again, Catherine died in early 1517 and the provisions on Navarre set out in the treaty were never enforced.

Talks continued between Navarrese diplomats and Charles V to reach an agreement over a marriage between Charles' sister Eleonor and the new king of Navarre, Henry II. The Parliament of Navarre in Pamplona, attended only by Beaumont party members, demanded the reattachment to Higher Navarre of "Coastal Navarre", the Basque districts better known as Biscay until the early 19th century.

=== Cisneros' repression on Charles V's accession ===
The Spanish cardinal Cisneros was acting as regent for the newly proclaimed King Charles. As such, in 1517 he decreed that all Navarrese castles be pulled down to prevent future resistance. Prominent Navarre figures who had stood up for the Navarrese monarchs were imprisoned in Atienza or forced into exile. The repression was aimed, in Cardinal Cisneros' words, at further "subjugating and constraining [Navarre], so that no one in that kingdom dares or ventures to rebel".

Mimicking the 1502 royal decision in Castile—the details of the decision are not well known—the Spanish imperial authorities decreed the forced conversion or the expulsion of the Navarrese Muslims living in and around Tudela, probably on 1 May 1516. However, by 1516 many of them had emigrated following exactions imposed for decades. Muslims emigrated from Navarre until 1520, with many of them settling in Aragon, where they found temporary shelter until their 1526 expulsion.

[...] Don Pedro de Navarra, who would not swear Charles as his king, [...] because he was not born in Spain, nor a member of the royal house of Castile by his father's line, so he should not swear to him, and that he was forced to keep this faith as a good gentleman, that one given to Don Juan de Labrit and Doña Catalina, the owner of Navarre, and his homeland.
– Pedro de Navarra, Marshal of Navarre, declining in prison Charles V's offer to join the Imperial forces (circa 1520)

The institutional framework of Navarre was preserved following the 1512 invasion. Once Ferdinand II of Aragon died in January, the Parliament of Navarre gathered in Pamplona, urging Charles V, aged 16, to attend a coronation ceremony in the town following tradition. The Parliament's envoys were met with the Emperor's utter indifference, if not contempt. He refused to attend any ceremony and stated "let us say that I am happy and [the proclamation proposal] pleases me". Eventually the Parliament met in 1517 without Charles V, who was represented by the Duke of Najera.

Charles pronounced an array of promises, while Parliament kept submitting grievances and demands for damages to the Emperor, a total of sixty-seven. The second viceroy of Navarre, Fadrique de Acuña, was deposed in 1515; probably for passing on the grievances. Contradictions in the documents relating to the Emperor's purported oath pledge in 1516 point to a contemporary manipulation of the records.

== 1521 French-Navarrese expedition ==
Navarrese reconquest attempt
- Part of the Italian War of 1521–1526
Date	1521–1524
Location	Kingdom of Navarre
Result	Castilian-Spanish victory

Belligerents
Spanish Monarchy	Kingdom of Navarre; France

Commanders and leaders
Antonio Manrique de Lara, 2nd Duke of Nájera	General Asparros; Jaime Vélaz de Medrano y Echauz, Alcaide and Mayor of Amauir-Maya

=== New hopes for a young generation ===
Francis Xavier and his family were involved and badly affected in the defense of Navarre

In 1520 and 1521, Castile was distracted by the Revolt of the Comuneros. The Crown of Aragon was also suffering economic difficulties as a consequence of the Revolt of the Brotherhoods. As a result, Spain was seen as a target of opportunity by the King Francis I of France. Meanwhile, the young King Henry II of Navarre, based in Béarn, saw a way to reconquer Navarre. Taking advantage of the synergies with France, Henry began raising a 12,000-strong army, mainly Gascons and Navarrese exiles. This Franco-Navarrese army was commanded by General Asparros (or Esparre). It consisted of 12,000 infantry, 800 mounted knights, and 29 pieces of artillery.

The Castilian Viceroy of Navarre, Antonio Manrique de Lara, 2nd Duke of Nájera, was caught off-guard. The Duke was responsible for guarding the Navarrese lands conquered in 1512, but he had moved the bulk of his troops away from Navarre to suppress the Revolt of the Comuneros in his home territory of Castile. Rumors of a "French" invasion had been widespread, with former comunero noble Pedro Girón warning of the impending invasion in April 1521.

Angry at the Castilian takeover of the ecclesiastic, administrative, and judicial institutions in Navarre, the Navarrese rose up in support of Henry II on hearing the news of Henry II's expedition. Volunteer bands were created in many places to expel the Castilians. As the Franco-Navarrese army approached Pamplona, the citizens revolted and besieged the Castilian military governor, Ignatius of Loyola, in his newly built castle. The garrison surrendered after a few days of resistance in late May 1521 in the Battle of Pampeluna (Pamplona). In less than three weeks, all of Navarre was reconquered.

Still, not all was settled. The absence of Henry II was disquieting to the population. Additionally, the troops led by General Asparros indulged in looting on arrival at Viana, leaving many angry and disappointed with an expedition that was meant to liberate them. The Franco-Navarrese army then moved out of friendly territory and into Castile, crossing the Ebro and besieging the town of Logroño, where the count of Lerin was stationed with a 4,000-strong force.

=== Castilian counterattack ===
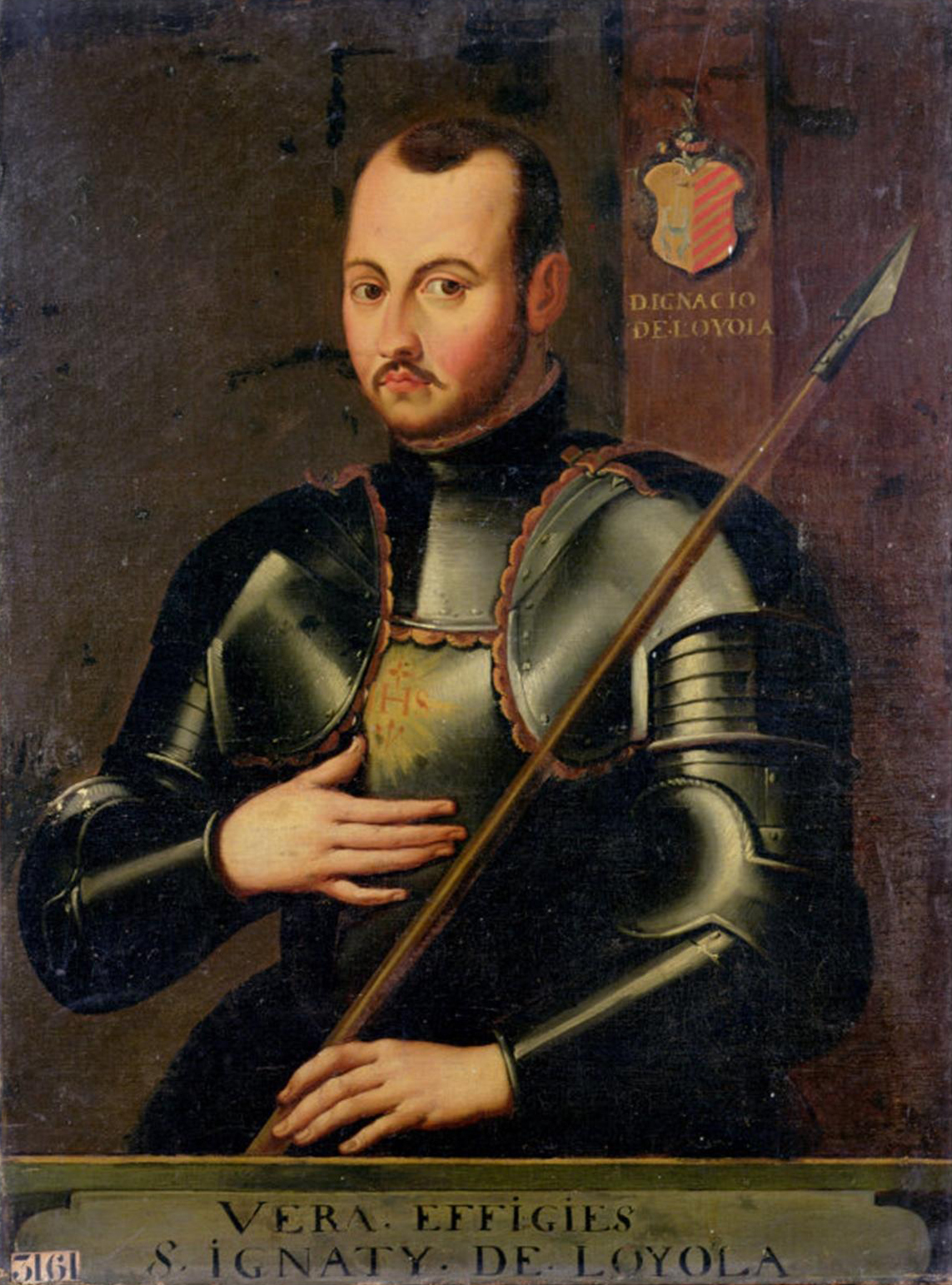
Ignatius of Loyola was severely injured on the leg by a Navarrese cannonball at Pamplona in May 1521

Unfortunately for the King of Navarre and the French, the Revolt of the Comuneros had been crushed at the Battle of Villalar in April. Not only was the Castilian government able to send its soldiers back to Navarre, but a large number of Castilian nobles who had supported the comuneros or vacillated between sides were now presented with an opportunity to prove their loyalty to Castile. Many formerly rebel-held towns sent soldiers to Navarre as well. Backed by a suddenly reunified Castile, an army of 30,000 men approached Navarre. On 11 June Asparros abandoned his siege of Logroño and retreated back to Tiebas, in Navarre. Asparros desperately requested reinforcements from Béarn, but Henry II refused the request, presumably not wanting to risk them in a battle that was likely already lost.

The Franco-Navarrese were completely defeated at the Battle of Esquiroz (Noáin) near Pamplona, on 30 June 1521. The French-Navarrese force did not have sufficient artillery to defend themselves, and were outnumbered by more than two-to-one. French and Navarrese losses numbered more than 6,000 dead, and General Asparros was captured, and released in return for a ransom of 10,500 ducats, and the surrender of Pamplona.

The Castilian fatalities numbered between 50 and 300. The victory was followed by an occupation in which the Navarrese were subject to abuse, pillaging, marginalization, and exile. This situation bred despair among many Navarrese, with many lords opting to switch sides to the victorious Castilians. The Castilians did not relent, and continued to send reinforcements to the area as Charles V and France went to war across Europe.

== Hondarribia and last stand at Amaiur ==
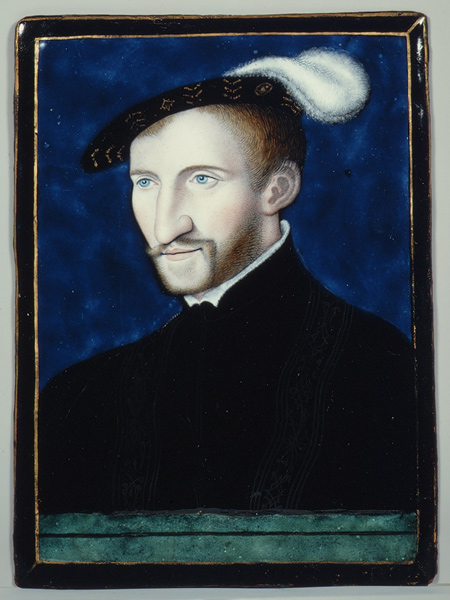
Henry II, successor to Queen Catherine as King of Navarre, pursued the reunification of Navarre

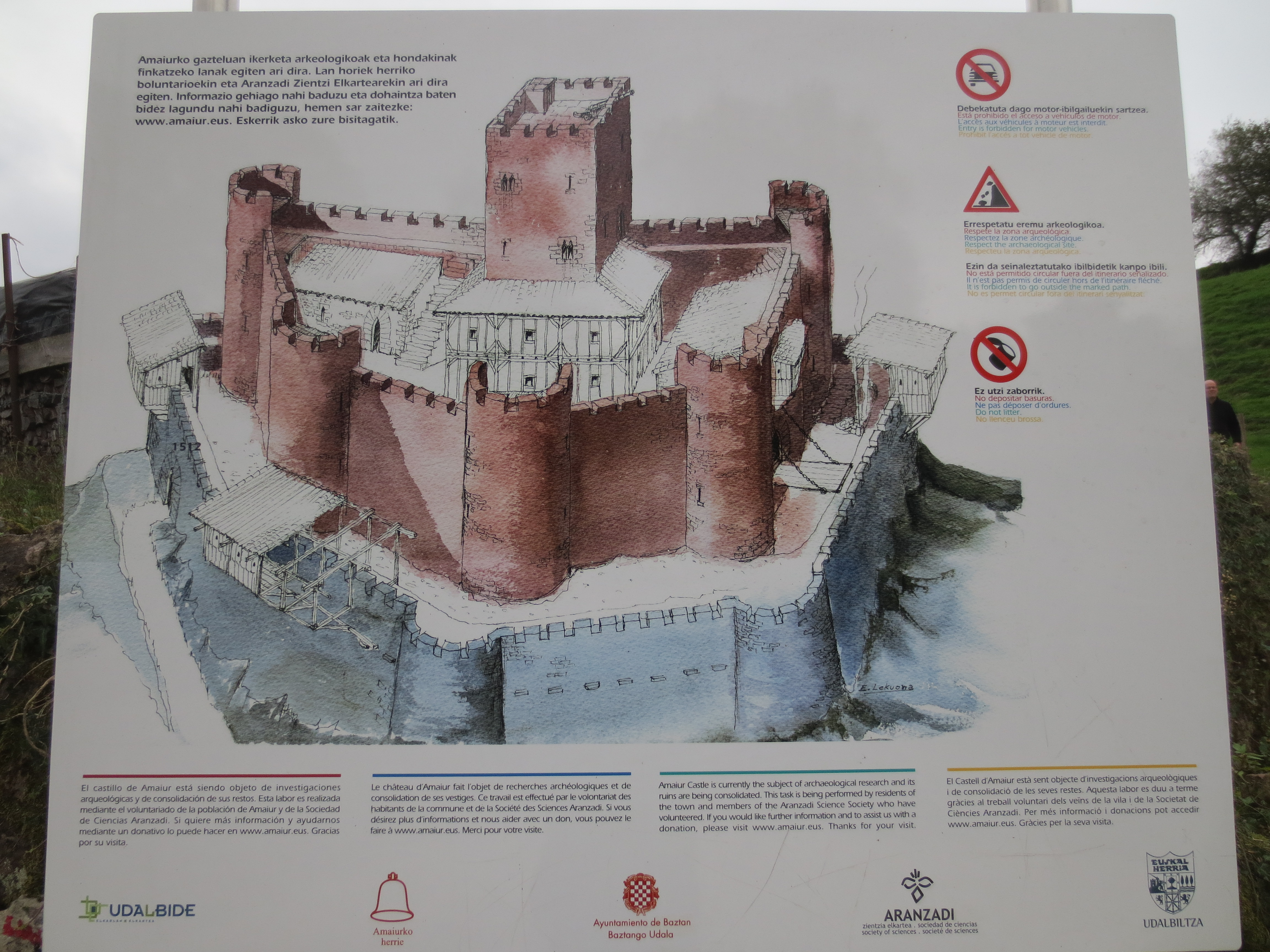
Fortress of Amaiur before 1512, sign at the foot of the hill

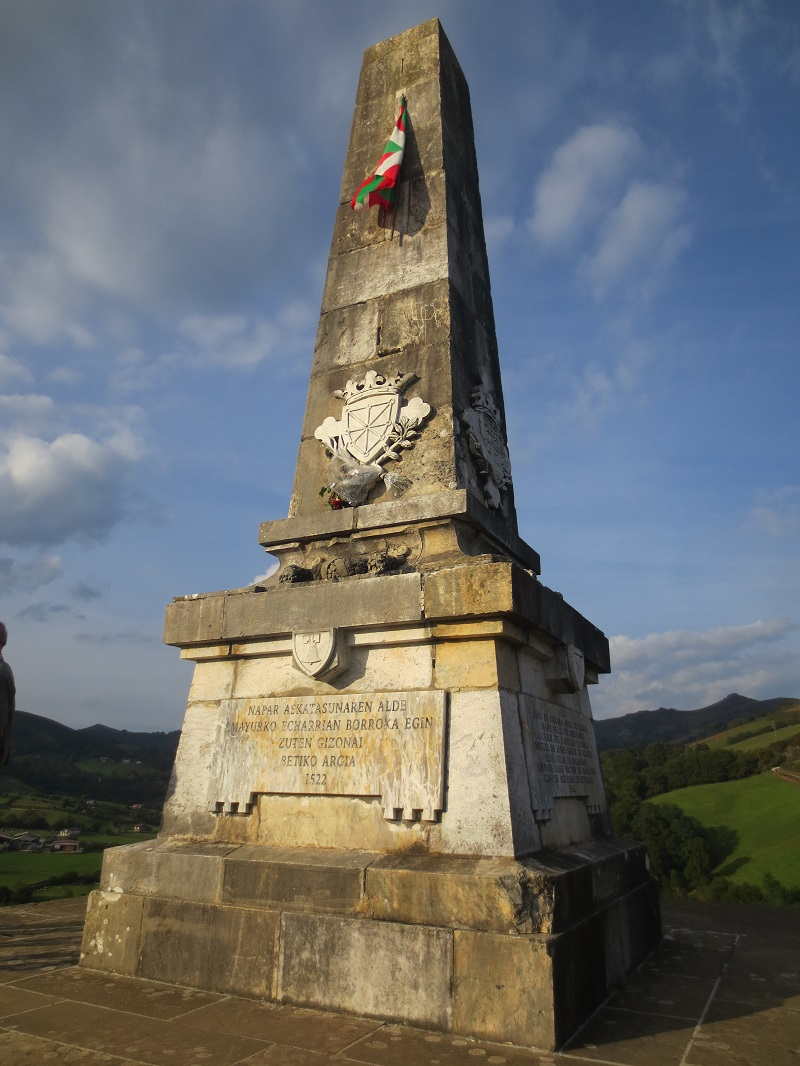
Memorial to the defenders of the independence of Navarre at the site of the Amaiur stronghold (1522–1922)

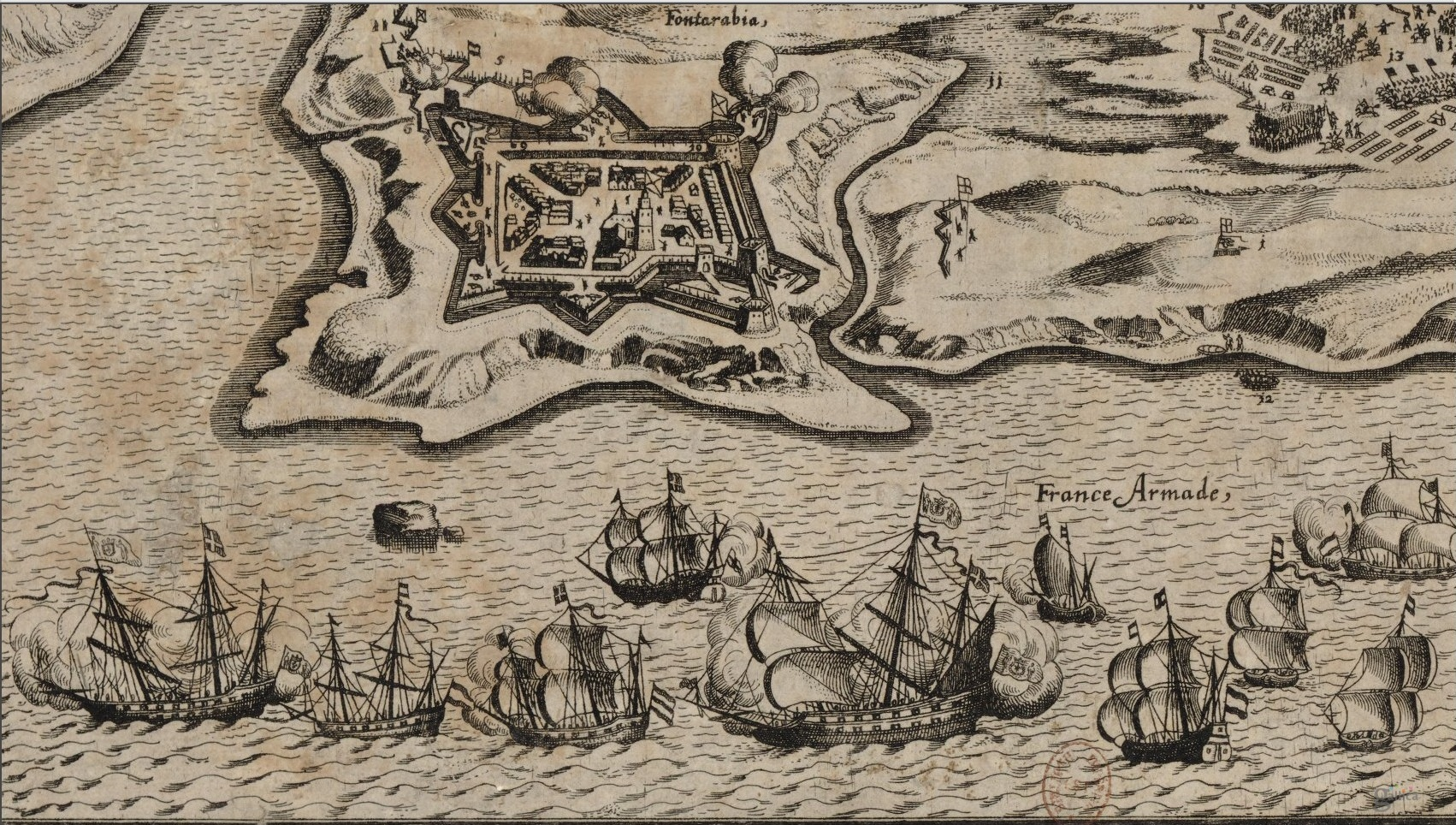
Stronghold of Hondarribia as depicted a century afterwards

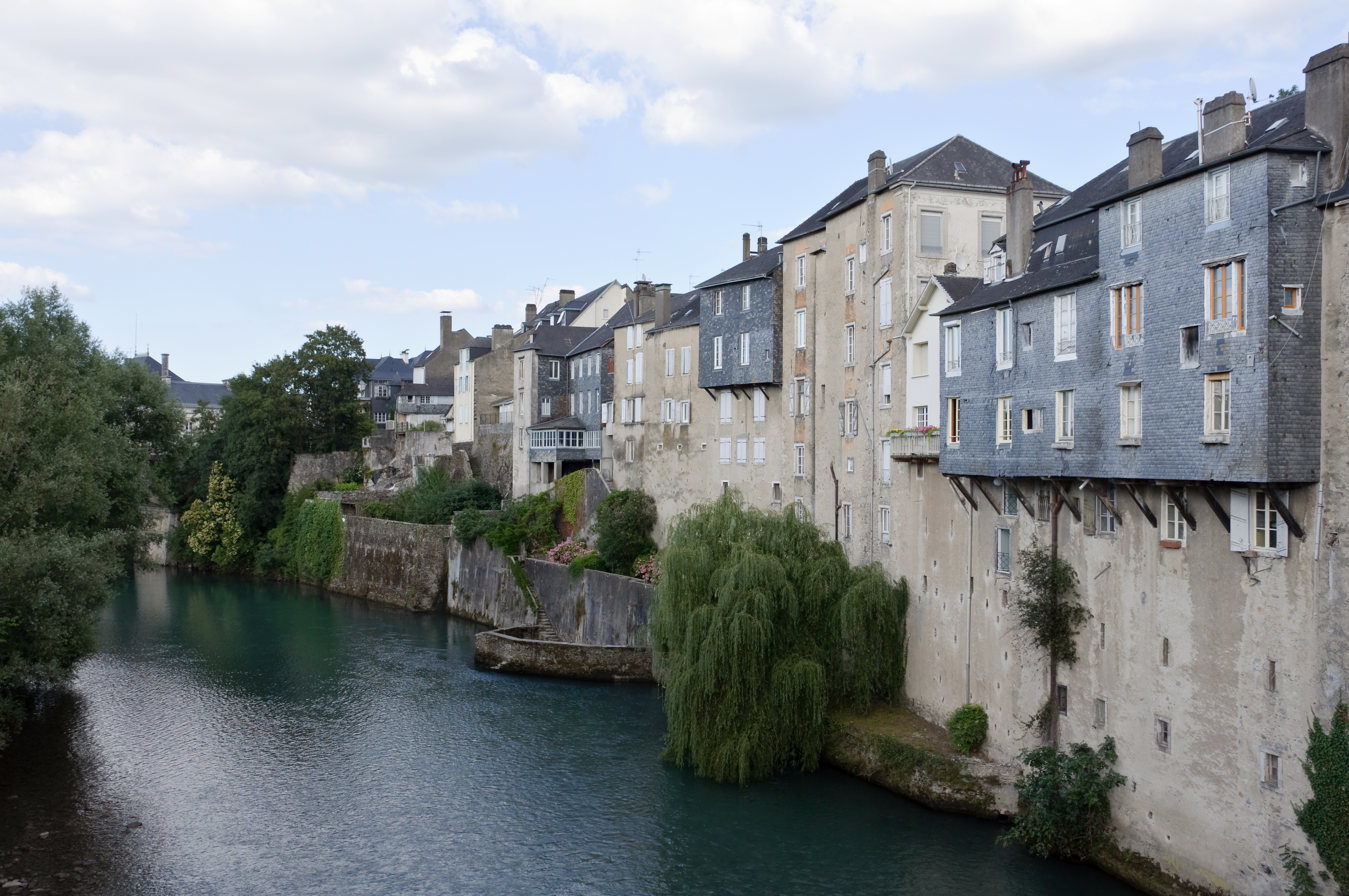
Gave d'Aspe and Oloron across the river (Béarn)

=== Franco-Navarrese expeditions over the coast and north Navarre ===
With the defeat at Noain still fresh in their memories, Henry II of Navarre and Francis I of France allied again to strike back. This time on the northern fringes of Navarre—probably expecting the Spanish to be worn out militarily and financially by their relentless war activity. In late September 1521, the Franco-Navarrese divided in two columns and advanced towards the Bidasoa.

The first column, made up of Agramont-party Navarrese, Normans, and Gascons, was based in Labourd (in French royal territory), while the second, formed by German, Gascon, and Norman infantry, set off from Saint-Jean-Pied-de-Port—then in the hands of troops loyal to Henry II. A total of 27,000 combatants were under the command of Guillaume Gouffier, seigneur de Bonnivet. Most of the troops were raised in the Norman and Pyrénées-based possessions of the Foix-Albret. After taking over Roncal, the second column headed west along the Pyrénées range, and captured Roncevaux.

The Franco-Navarrese force approached the fortress of Amaiur (Baztan, Navarre), laying siege to the fortress the Castilians had just reinforced. On 2 October 1521 Jaime Vélaz de Medrano y Echauz was appointed as the mayor and Alcaide of the town and castle of Amaiur-Maya. On 3 October 1521 the Castilians capitulated in exchange for free passage to Castile. The troops of Guillaume Gouffier then headed to Labourd and on to Behobia, capturing the fortress of Urantzu and moving on to invest the coastal stronghold of Hondarribia (Fuenterrabía, Fontarabie) at the tip of Gipuzkoa in the Basque Country. This stronghold was captured on 12 October 1521 (other sources state 6 October). The Franco-Navarrese held sway over an area extending from Belate to the mouth of the Bidasoa river.

In May 1522, with Charles V in Pamplona, the Spanish forces started to gather the funds and troops necessary to respond. In July 1522, with Navarrese Amaiur about to fall, the Emperor disembarked in Santander with 4,000 landsknechts. Many Basques from Biscay proper, Gipuzkoa, Álava, and even Navarre joined Charles V's forces, as did a number of Aragonese. Ahead of the Castilian expedition to the Bidasoa, a combination of Gipuzkoan militias supported by 1,000 landsknecht engaged the Franco-Navarrese at the fortress of Urantzu in the Battle of San Marcial. The pro-Imperial forces took the position on 30 June 1522.

=== Fall of Amaiur ===
While Charles V made military arrangements, he also issued a decree pardoning many of the banished and exiled Agramont party members loyal to Henry II. Charles V seems to have followed Ferdinand II's tactics, the partial pardon was intertwined with repression, such as a new order to pull down remaining Agramont and other Navarrese fortresses, besides putting Agramont leaders loyal to King Henry II to trial on lèse-majesté charges.

On 4 July 1522, a 7,000-strong Castilian expedition left from Pamplona, and by 15 July Amaiur was invested. The fortress was defended by 200 Navarrese loyal knights commanded by Jaime Vélaz de Medrano, from the House of the Lords of Igúzquiza and Palace of Vélaz de Medrano, Alcaide and Mayor of Amauir-Maya and one of the 1512 leaders of Estella-Lizarra. However, no relief force arrived and it ultimately fell to the Count of Miranda on 19 July 1522. A commemorative monolith now stands on the site of the fortress. After the capitulation of Amaiur, orders were issued by the Venetian-born Castilian bishop of Pamplona, John de Rena, to level the fortress and pull down a number houses owned by Agramont sympathisers, as well as setting fire to the Abbey of Urdazubi.

The 39 surviving Navarrese defenders of Amaiur were taken to Pamplona and held captive in the Saint Nicolas fortress. Besides Jaime Velaz de Medrano, they included Jaime's son Luis Velaz de Medrano, Miguel de Jaso, lord of Xavier, and Francis Xavier's oldest brother. They were imprisoned in Pamplona, with some accounts saying that Jaime and his son were poisoned and others say they were released. Miguel managed to escape dressed in woman garments; he joined his brother John de Jaso and the 3,000 strong garrison of Hondarribia—1,000 Navarrese and 2,000 French. The garrison included Claude of Lorraine as one of its commanders.

=== Charles V's thrust to the north of the Pyrenees ===
At the peak of Francis' and Henry II's campaign, the Navarrese king made a symbolic gesture: he called the Estates of Navarre in Saint-Palais (Donapaleu), reuniting on 18 August 1523 at the church of Saint-Paul. The king took an oath days later to respect the Navarrese laws (fueros), and reorganized the Navarrese administration according to actual territorial control. Charles V felt his authority in Navarre was being defied, and designed a plan to subdue Henry II and Francis, and finally suppress Navarrese resistance. His ambitious plan aimed at invading Lower Navarre, Toulouse, Bayonne, and Hondarribia after Amaiur was captured.

The Viceroy of Aragon advanced to Oloron in Béarn and laid siege to the town, while the army of the Prince of Orange Philibert of Chalon failed to take Bayonne. Frustrated at his failure, on his withdrawal south Philibert devastated Ustaritz, and sacked Biarritz and Saint-Jean-de-Luz (Donibane Lohizune). Other towns and villages inland straddling the Navarre-Béarn border were also devastated. Eventually, the Imperial forces focused all their strength on capturing Hondarribia. On 15 December 1523, Charles V issued a new pardon, this time including most of the Navarrese Agramont leaders, except for 152 prominent figures, some of them still fighting in Hondarribia.

=== Political arrangements ===
The Battle of Hondarribia (Fuenterrabía) would last until April 1524. On 19 February 1524, the Navarrese forces commanded by Pedro de Navarra, son of the assassinated Navarrese marshall, capitulated to Iñigo Fernandez de Velasco, his own uncle. On 29 April, Charles decreed a final general pardon, with the defenders of Hondarribia leaving the position after virtually two years of investment. The pardon was substantiated before the emperor on 3 May at a ceremony held in Burgos. The Navarrese leaders were promised a restitution of their properties, but only after vowing loyalty to Charles V. Ultimately, some of the defenders of the position were given positions in Charles V court—but far from Navarre—and their properties were partially or fully restored, but not without problems. With this surrender, Navarrese resistance to the Spanish-Castilian occupation was dealt its final blow.

Localized military clashes were now confined to the southern fringes of Lower Navarre (Nafarroa Beherea in Basque, see map). In 1525, a Spanish attack captured St-Jean-Pied-de-Port again, it was held by the Spanish for almost two years, but in 1527 the lord of Luxe (Lukuze) and Esteban de Albret, lord of Miossens, recaptured the position. Except for a Spanish outpost in Luzaide/Valcarlos the region was abandoned in 1528 due to Charles V's loss of interest and the difficulties of defending it. France's loss of the wider war, with King Francis' and Henry II's capture at the Battle of Pavia in February 1525, sealed the division of Navarre. While Henry II managed to escape from prison, the Treaty of Madrid on 1 January 1526 and the Treaty of Cambrai in 1529 confirmed Spanish control over the Iberian part of Navarre—Francis I committed to denying assistance to Henry II.

== Aftermath and consequences ==
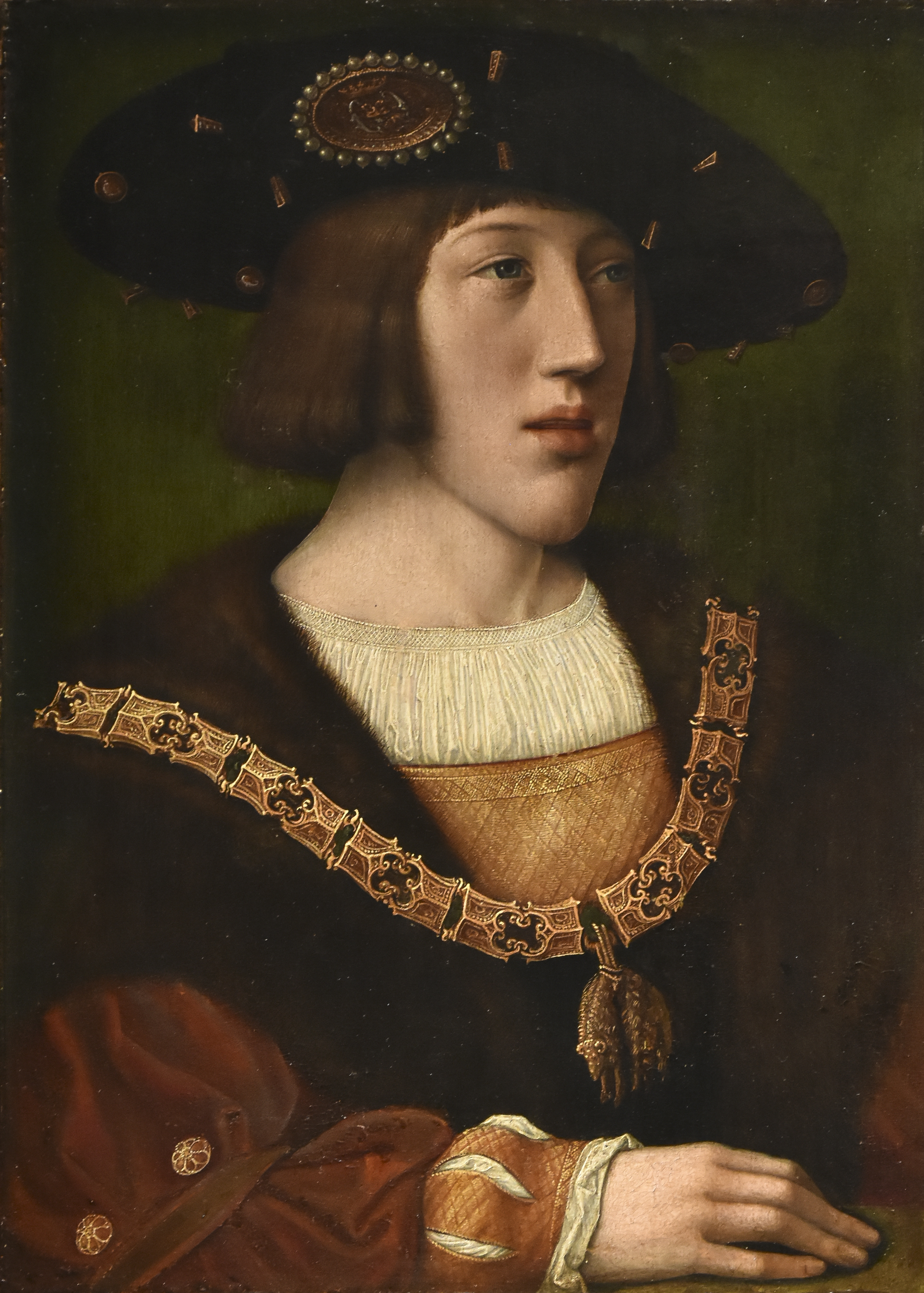
Young Charles V inherited the hot issue of Navarre

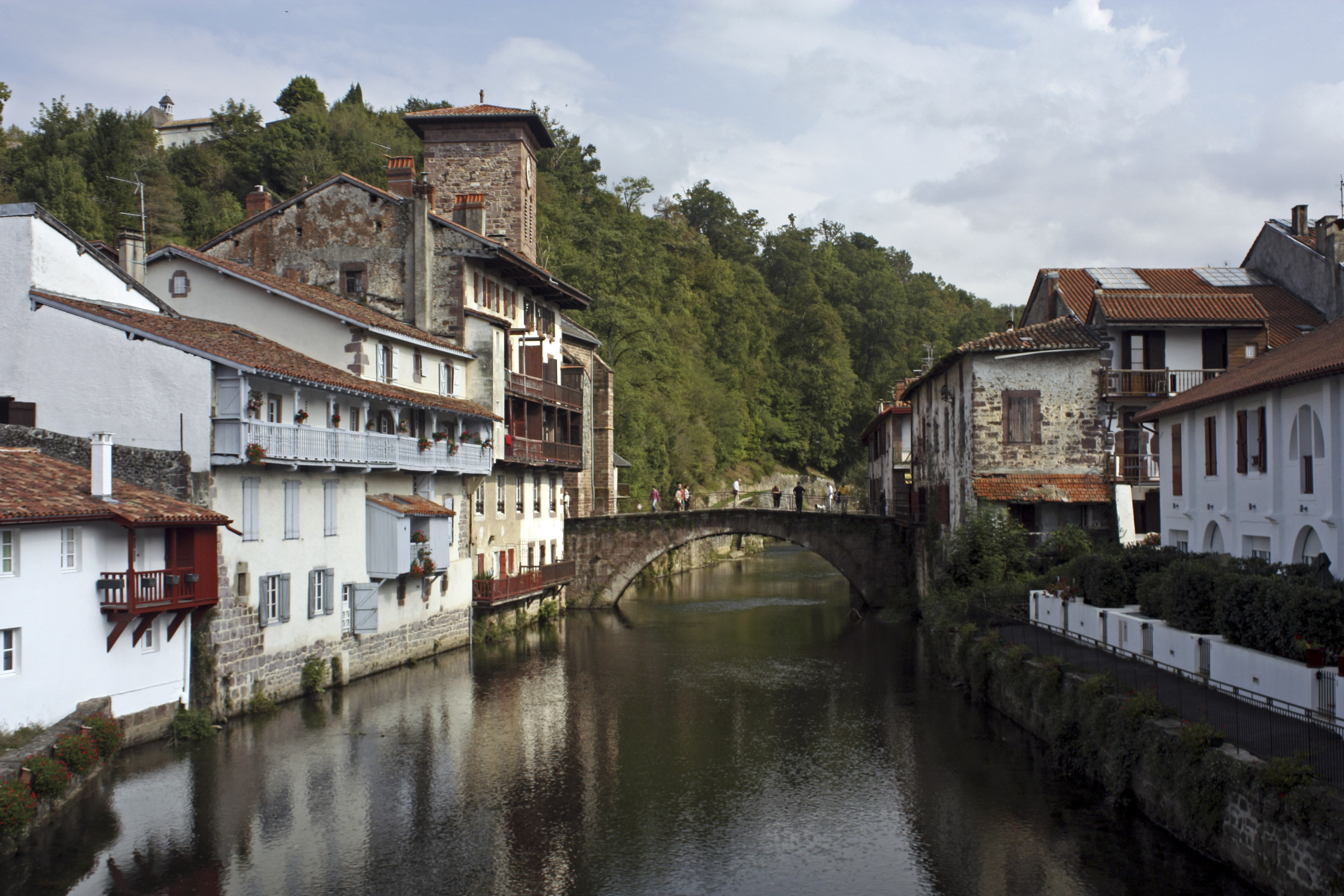
Main entrance and bridge to St-Jean-Pied-de-Port

=== Institutional takeover during occupation ===
The successive pardons decreed by Charles V were intended to help integrate Navarre into Habsburg Spain. A series of pardons to clergy who had sided with the Navarrese monarchs were also decreed, with the first just after the 1512 invasion. However, distrust to the loyalty of the Navarrese was maintained throughout the 16th century while Protestant and independent Navarre existed to the north of the Pyrenees, prior to its absorption into France in 1620. Holdings confiscated from subjects loyal to Henry II began to be returned, but the procedures were fraught with problems, were accompanied by judicial persecution, and were accompanied by exemplary sentences for Agramont party leaders.

While no burning of books is attested, as happened during the follow-up to the conquest of Granada in Oran (on Cardinal Cisneros' orders), large numbers of books, records and archives are missing; these relate to jurisprudence, accountancy, appointments, Parliament and Royal Council sessions, as well as property titles of the period prior to the 1512 invasion from the mid 15th century to early 16th century, with records resuming in 1512.

Files relating to the previous period appear to have been seized by the Spanish monarchy or their newly appointed authorities. The vast majority of the population was Basque-speaking and was mostly illiterate, relying on a bilingual notary who could write in Romance (a Navarrese variant merging with Castilian) or Latin, but a requirement was imposed to re-register property titles before Castilian officials. Failing registration, ownership of the holding was invalidated and was subject to confiscation in favour of the occupier.

Navarre remained on a state of military occupation until at least 1530. All positions in the kingdom's government were taken over by Castilian appointees, namely bishops, viceroys, and administrative personnel of the Royal Tribunals, the Royal Council, Accounts Chamber (Comptos), and the curia. Pamplona, and other Navarrese towns were garrisoned by Castilian or Castilian-controlled troops. Navarrese ecclesiastics were prevented from rising to the position of abbot or above. Navarrese showing a submissive demeanour were occasionally kept or appointed as officials.

Since the Spanish conquest, each time a bishop vacancy occurred, either the cathedral chapter of Pamplona, or later the Diputacion, would request a Navarrese bishop, but to no avail. For example, in 1539 an extensive report insisted on choosing a native ecclesiastic for the position on a number of accounts, one of them being that he could speak Basque and would be obeyed by his subjects, "for his native origin and because the Basque people, the main part of the kingdom, love like no other nation their own nature and language." The report was turned down without explanation, and a Castilian bishop appointed. Historian of the church Goñi Gaztanbide (Historia de los Obispos de Pamplona, 1985) is adamant in his criticism, denouncing the "Castilian assimilation of Navarrese Church at all levels," to the point of considering that it was subjected to a colonial regime.

=== Heresy against a political backdrop ===
The Navarrese continued turning their eyes to their Protestant brethren to the north, in Henry II's independent Navarre with Béarn. Navarre, like Gipuzkoa, became a hotspot of penetration for Protestant ideas as early as 1521, when the Inquisition seized and set fire to a number of books. A ban was imposed on reading them, or even writing or preaching against Protestant doctrines, in order to avoid bringing attention to their claims.

In 1525, shortly after Henry II's two failed reconquest campaigns, the first witchcraft allegations were instigated by the graduate Balanza, a member of the Royal Council and a commissioner of inquiries on witchcraft for Navarre. He sent letters to the Castilian bishop of Pamplona, John de Rena (an able military administrator, but not ordained for religious functions). Balanza asserted that there existed "so much evil" in a number of southern Pyrenean valleys—starting from Salazar and Roncal, to Burguete (Auritz), Baztan, Bortziriak, Malerreka (to Pamplona)—located in the rear of the St-Jean-Pied-de-Port front in Lower Navarre, and an active theatre of war just a few years or months before, "it should not be only me who is aware of it". After his inquiry and the resultant trials, held between January and August 1525, 30–40 people, mostly women, were condemned and burnt alive by the occupation authorities; other sources point to 200. A further 43 were stripped of their property.

On 15 August 1532, Ana of Albret, the sister of Henry II, died. She expressed in her will the wish to be buried with her parents Catherine I and John III in Pamplona, but her wish was not honoured. She also bequeathed her dominion as Princess of Viana to her brother King Henry II. Doubts over the occupation of Navarre perturbed Charles V until death. He attempted to find a compromise suiting both his ambitions and the monarchs of Navarre. To that end, he tried to marry his son and successor Philip II of Spain to the heir-apparent of Navarre, Jeanne d'Albret, in 1539, highlighting her high educational background and intelligence. These attempts ultimately failed, but Charles V left Philip II instructions on his will to give Navarre back, "following his conscience". That never happened.
