= Siege of Fuenterrabía =

Siege of Fuenterrabía may refer to:

- Siege of Fuenterrabía (1638)
- Siege of Fuenterrabía (1523–1524)
