= Luxa (disambiguation) =

Luxa may refer to:

- Luxa (album), an album composed and performed by Harold Budd
- Luxa Flex Records, a Dutch record label
- Petr Luxa, a Czech tennis player
- Luxa, a NPC (non-player character) in Star Wars franchise CRPG. See. Knights of the Old Republic
- Luxa, a character from Suzanne Collins's Underland Chronicles
- Luxe-Sumberraute, a municipality in the region of Lower Navarre, Pyrenées-Atlantiques, France
