= Pedro, Marshal of Navarre =

Navarrese noble

Pedro de Navarra (Basque: Petri Nafarroakoa; before 1471 - 24 November 1522) was a nobleman in the Kingdom of Navarre and its highest military authority as Marshal of Navarre during the kingdom's last years of independence, as well as the following tumultuous period. He was active in diplomacy and war until 1516, when he was captured by Spanish troops. He was sent to prison in Castile and was found dead in his cell, probably assassinated, in 1522.

== Lineage ==
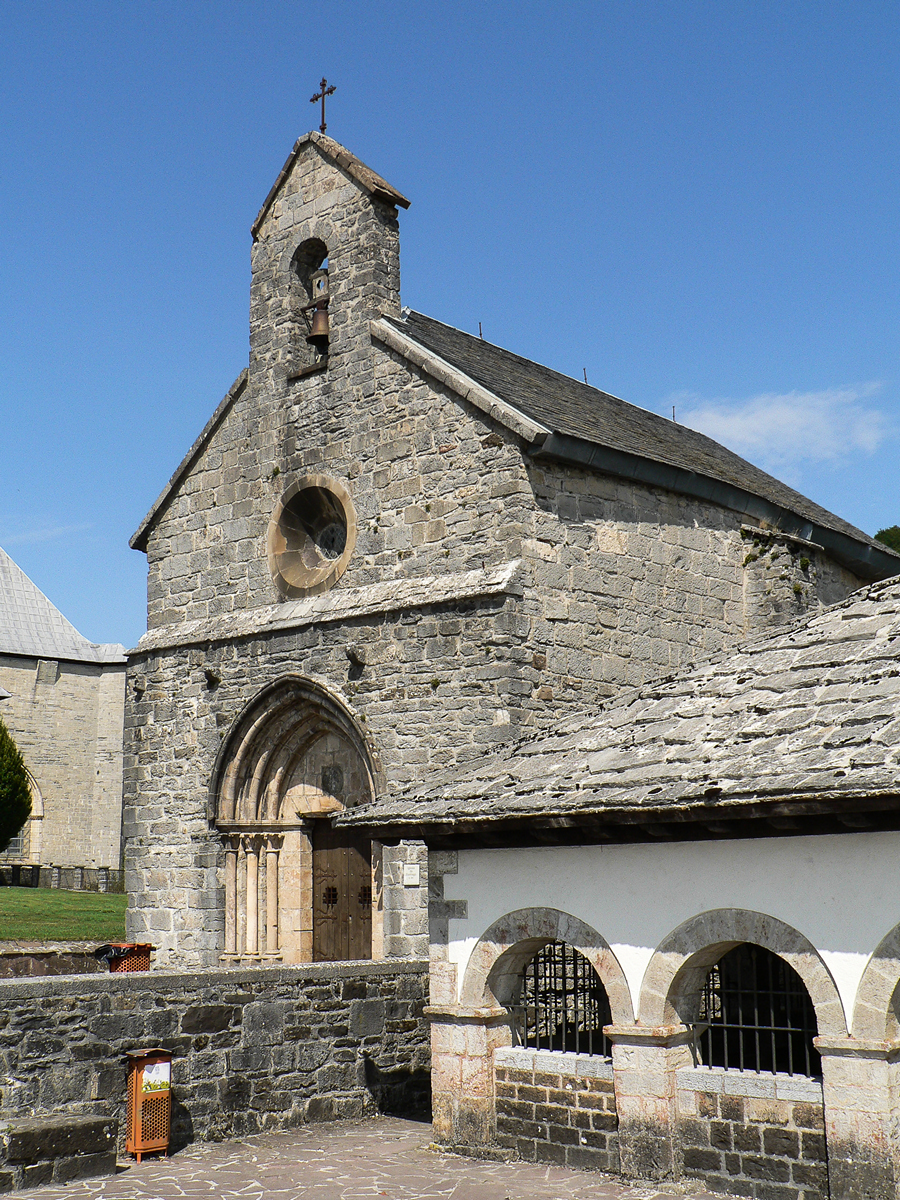
Roncevaux, critical landmark in the 1516 reconquest attempt

Pedro's ancestry goes back to Leonel, illegitimate son of King Charles II of Navarre (1332–1387). Later in time, Felipe de Navarra was appointed marshal in 1428, dying in 1450. Pedro, his son with Juana de Peralta, succeeded him in the position, but the marshal fell dead at Pamplona in obscure circumstances at the hands of the Beaumont party (1471). Pedro the father had two sons with Ines de Lacarra—Felipe and Pedro. The former and eldest was murdered in 1481, making the latter automatically eligible for the marshal position after his father's death.

Before his marriage to Mayor, he had a son, Francisco de Navarra y Hualde, with a lady surnamed Hualde, from Tafalla. In 1498, he married Mayor de la Cueva, daughter of Beltran de la Cueva, 1st Duke of Alburquerque, with whom he had a son, Pedro de Navarra (junior), who participated in the Siege of Hondarribia (1523–1524).

=== Siblings ===
Pedro de Navarra was the brother of María de Navarra, lady of Sartaguda, she married Carlos Ramírez de Arellano, lord of Alcañadre. Pedro's sister Catalina de Navarra married in 1454 to Juan de Ezpeleta, viscount of Valderro (†1471).

His sister Juana de Navarra married to Louis Enríquez de Lacarra, lord of Ablitas, who left her a widow. Juana de Navarra married a second time, to Ladron de Mauléon, and together they had a daughter named Ana de Mauleon y Navarra. Pedro's niece Ana married Juan Vélaz de Medrano y Echauz, and together they had a son named Juan Vélaz de Medrano y Mauleon y Navarra (Pedro's first cousin once removed).

== Spanish invasion of Navarre ==
Pedro, loyal to the House of Foix-Albret, spearheaded frequent diplomatic tasks, standing out in them rather than in military operations. He was overshadowed by Cesare Borgia as skillful military commander when he turned up in Navarre on his flight from prison in Castile. Queen Catherine and King John III assigned the defense of the kingdom to the tenacious Roman commander. Eventually, on Cesare Borgia's death outside Viana in 1507, Pedro took over as Marshal of Navarre.

He went on to become a cornerstone and prestigious figure in Navarre's defense on King Ferdinand II of Aragón's invasion of the kingdom (1512). However, he was captured at Isaba (Roncal) during the failed 1516 expedition against the occupation forces of the Spanish regent Cardinal Cisneros. On 29 May 1518, while prisoner at the Castle of Atienza (Castile), he was offered the apologies of the emperor Charles V should he pledge loyalty to him, in face of which he replied as follows:

With all humility once again I entreat his Majesty to prove with me the magnificence that could be expected from such immense Majesty, by giving my full freedom back, as well as permission to go and provide service to whom I am obliged. The loyalty, the cleanness His Highness wishes and requires from his servers, I will be able to entrust to those of my kind, so that I become captive and slave at their service.

== Death ==
While in prison at Simancas (Castile), the marshal was deprived by the governor of his long-time (23 years) trusted servant, Felipe de Vergara, who was transferred to Valladolid. His replacement, Pedro de Frías, bore witness to the marshal's fears of having his throat cut after the decision to separate Felipe de Vergara from him.

After the Imperial failure to capture Hondarribia in 1522 from the French-Navarrese, he died of severe wounds inflicted on his throat, probably assassinated. His death remained shrouded in obscurity, no official announcement was made by the Imperial authorities until 9 February 1523, when the viceroy, acting at the behest of Emperor Charles V, decreed the confiscation of all the marshal's holdings. Likewise, his will and correspondence vanished, and no return of remains or personal objects are attested.

== See also ==
- Principality of Béarn
- Ferdinand II of Aragon
- Henry II of Navarre
- History of the Basques
