= Charles of Navarre =

Navarrese prince

Charles of Navarre or Charles d'Albret (12 December 1510, Pau - September 1528, Naples) was a prince of Navarre.

Charles was a member of the Albret dynasty and one of the youngest children of the Navarrese monarchs Catherine and John III. On their mother's death in 1517 Charles's elder brother Henry II inherited the crown. Navarre joined with the League of Cognac against Emperor Charles V and Charles of Navarre fought against the Imperial forces at Naples in 1528, where he was captured. He died the following year whilst still heir presumptive to the throne of Navarre - Henry II's first child, Joan, was only born in November 1528.
