= Antonio Manrique de Lara, 2nd Duke of Nájera =

Spanish noble and military leader

Antonio Manrique de Lara, 2nd Duke of Nájera (c. 1466 - 13 December 1535) was a Spanish noble and military leader, and Viceroy of Navarre between 1516 and 1521. He was made a knight in the Order of the Golden Fleece by Charles I of Spain in 1519.

== Biography ==
He was the second son of Pedro Manrique de Lara, captain general of Army of Navarre and capitán general de la Frontera de Aragón, Navarra y Jaén. His mother was Guiomar de Castro.

His father was named 1st Duke of Nájera by Ferdinand II of Aragon and Isabella I of Castile on 30 August 1482. Antonio became second Duke in 1515, when his father died. He was also 3rd Count of Treviño.

Antonio appointed the preacher Antonio de Medrano (also known as Francisco de Medrano) as his chaplain and even defended him publicly when he faced charges from the Inquisition in 1532. Francisco maintained a close connection to the court of Antonio Manrique de Lara. His bold and unconventional behavior often drew the attention of the Holy Office, leading to repeated clashes. Despite this, the Duke of Nájera consistently came to his defense during each dispute.

Appointed viceroy of Navarre by Cardinal Cisneros in 1516, he was ordered to pacify the newly conquered Kingdom. But he acted in such a brutal manner, that he became much hated by the Navarrese. When the son of the former King of Navarre, Henry II sent a large French/Navarrese army commanded by General André de Foix to reconquer his Kingdom, the Navarrese population supported them and in less than three weeks, all of Navarre was retaken.

In 1520 he participated in the repression of the Revolt of the Comuneros and in 1521 he defeated the French in the Siege of Logroño, and the Battle of Noáin. After the reconquest of the Kingdom by the Spanish, Antonio was sidelined and retired to his estates in La Rioja, where he died in 1535.

== Marriage and children ==
He married in 1503 with Juana Cardona Y Enriquez (died 1547), sister of Fernando Ramon Folch, 2nd Duke of Cardona.
They had seven children :

- Juan Esteban (1504–1558), 3rd Duke of Nájera, knight in the Order of the Golden Fleece.
- Aldonza, no issue.
- Guiomar (died 1543), no issue.
- Juan Fernandéz (1508–1570), viceroy of Naples in 1558, had issue.
- Rodrigo, had issue.
- María, no issue.
- Bernardino (died 1591), Commendador de Herrera, had issue.

Government offices
Preceded by 1st Marquis of Comares	Viceroy of Navarre; 1516–1521	Succeeded by 3rd Count of Miranda
