= Anne of Navarre =

Navarresse infanta and regent (1492–1532)

- Born: 19 May 1492
- Died: 15 August 1532 (aged 40)
- House: Albret
- Father: John of Albret
- Mother: Catherine, Queen of Navarre

Anne d'Albret of Navarre (19 May 1492 – 15 August 1532), called Infanta Ana, was a princess of Navarre. She was the heir to the throne of Navarre in 1492-1496 and 1496–1501. She acted as regent of Navarre for her brother Henry II of Navarre several times between 1517 and 1532.

== Life ==
Anne was the daughter of Queen Catherine of Navarre and her husband and co-ruler, John III, and the sister of Henry II of Navarre.

Anne was the heir to the throne of Navarre from her birth in 1492 until the birth of her first surviving brother in 1501. This made her the subject of several marital proposals, particularly from Ferdinand and Isabella, who worked actively from 1494 to 1496 to have her betrothed to their son and heir John, Prince of Asturias: in 1495, it was agreed that Anne would need the consent of Ferdinand and Isabella to marry. The marriage plans to Juan were discontinued in 1496, when her first brother was born and she was no longer an heir to the throne: and while her brother died not long after, restoring her to her position, Juan had in the meantime been married off to Margaret of Austria.

After this, a marriage was suggested to Gaston of Foix, Duke of Nemours, son of John of Foix, Viscount of Narbonne, in order to unite the two Navarrese royal factions, but the marriage did not materialize as Ferdinand and Isabella withheld their consent. In 1500, Anne, at that point yet again heir to the throne, was promised to the grandson of Ferdinand and Isabella. The marriage was never to materialize, since by 1512 Navarre was conquered by Aragon and there was no longer any need for Ferdinand of Aragon to annex Navarre by a marriage alliance. Because of the treaty of 1495, in which Anne could not be married without the consent of Ferdinand and Isabella, it was difficult for Anne to marry, and she was to remain unmarried.

After the invasion of Aragon in 1512, Anne lived with her parents in France. On 12 February 1517, her brother Henry II of Navarre succeeded to the throne. As Henry II was thirteen when becoming King, and therefore a minor, Anne, being twenty five, acted as his regent until his fifteenth birthday in April 1518. Since he spent most of his time at the French royal court during his reign, Anne ruled French Navarre as regent in his absence for several periods between his accession in 1517 and her own death in 1532.

Anne was described as:

"afflicted by miserable health….scrawny, hunchbacked and of a ridiculously small size. However, she was an intelligent woman who valiantly took on the weight of administration during her brother’s prolonged visits to the French court".
