= John III of Navarre =

King of Navarre from 1484 to 1516

John III
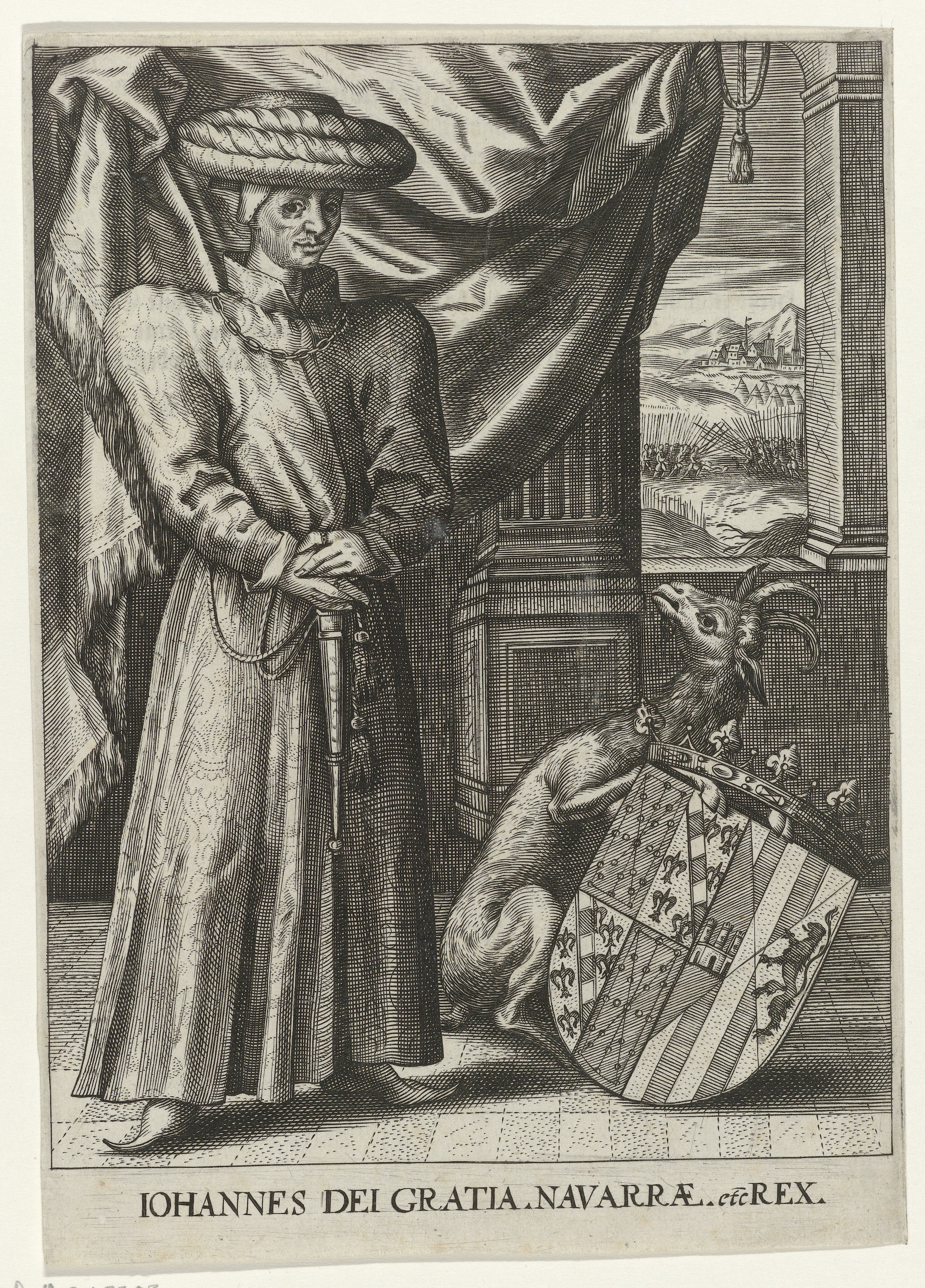
- 16th century depiction of King John

King of Navarre
- Reign: 14 June 1484 – 17 June 1516
- Coronation: 12 January 1494
- Predecessor: Catherine
- Successor: Catherine
- Co-monarch: Catherine
- Contender: Ferdinand II of Aragon (1512–1516)
- Born: 1469; Ségur
- Died: 17 June 1516 (aged 46–47); Monein
- Burial: Lescar Cathedral
- Spouse: Catherine, Queen of Navarre (m. 1484)
- Issue among others...: Infanta Anne; Henry II, King of Navarre; Infante Charles; Isabella, Viscountess of Rohan
- House: Albret
- Father: Alain I, Lord of Albret
- Mother: Frances, Countess of Périgord

Act by which John III and Catherine swore to uphold the fueros of Navarre after their coronation. John's name (Don Johan) is in boldface in the middle of the ninth line.

John III (French: Jean d'Albret, Spanish: Juan III, Basque: Joanes III; 1469 – 14 June 1516) was King of Navarre from 1484 until his death in 1516 as the husband and co-ruler of Queen Catherine.

== King of Navarre ==
John was the son of Alain I, Lord of Albret, and Frances, Countess of Périgord.

John became King of Navarre and Count of Foix by virtue of his marriage to Queen Catherine in 1484. He shared with Catherine tasks related to the government of the kingdom, but his rule was marked by the guardianship of Catherine's mother Magdalena de Valois up to 1494—she died in 1495—and persistent diplomatic and military pressure of Ferdinand II of Aragon over the Crown of Navarre, supported on the ground by the Beaumont party of Navarre.

John and Catherine were crowned as monarchs in Pamplona on 10 January 1494. In the run-up to the ceremony, Louis of Beaumont—count of Lerín—had taken over and ransacked the stronghold. On Christmas 1493, the count blocked the access of the king and queen to the capital city, but after a fleeting peace agreement was reached, the ceremony was held. In the week-long festival following the crowning ceremony, John III and his father are referred to in Basque language verses as Labrit, their usual naming in Navarre—also at Olite in 1493, document written in Romanic language.

=== The kingdom invaded ===
In 1512, Navarre was invaded by a combined Castilian-Aragonese army sent by Ferdinand II of Aragon, whose second wife was Germaine de Foix (1490–1538), a cousin of Queen Catherine. The Castilian troops commanded by the duke of Alba crossed the Pyrénées onto Lower Navarre capturing St-Jean-Pied-de-Port on 10 September 1512 and wreaking havoc across much of the merindad. There the Castilians were doggedly opposed by lords loyal to John III and Catherine of Navarre, but the Castilians retained St-Jean-Pied-de-Port and its hinterland.

On 18 February 1513 Pope Julius II issued a papal bull excommunicating King John III de Albret and Queen Catherine de Foix of Navarre for supporting King Louis XII of France in his conflict against the Papal States.

Following the invasion, Navarre south of the Pyrenees was annexed to Castile nominally as an autonomous kingdom (aeque principalis) by the victorious Ferdinand after taking an oath to respect the Navarrese laws and institutions (1515).

The royal family took shelter in Béarn, a royal Pyrenean domain and principality contiguous to Lower Navarre. In 1510, the Parliament of Navarre and the States-General of Béarn had passed a bill to create a confederation with a view to ensuring a better defence against external aggression. The capital city of Béarn was Pau, which John III and Catherine took as their main base along with Orthez and Tarbes in their last period.

=== Reconquest attempt and death ===
After the Aragonese king Ferdinand's death in January 1516, the king John III mustered an army in Sauveterre-de-Béarn made up of Navarrese exiles and men from all over his domains, especially from Béarn, but the total figure of combatants amounted to no more than several hundreds. The advance of the two columns led by Pedro, Marshal of Navarre was stopped by the Castilians right on the Pyrénées due to spies informing Cardinal Cisneros. The reconquest attempt was flawed.

Depressed by the defeats and adverse diplomatic results, John III died at the castle of Esgouarrabaque in Monein, Béarn, on 17 June 1516 after lying gripped by fatal fevers. Up to the last moment he struggled to get Navarre back from the Spanish, urging his wife, Queen Catherine, to send a representative to the Cortes of Castile to demand the restoration of the kingdom of Navarre. Despite his wish to be buried at the Santa Maria Cathedral of Pamplona, the permanent Spanish occupation prevented that. His corpse rests instead at the Cathedral of Lescar along with Queen Catherine, who outlived him only a few months.

== Family ==
John and Catherine of Navarre had:

- Anne (19 May 1492 – 15 August 1532)
- Magdalena (29 March 1494 – May 1504)
- Catherine (1495 – November 1532), abbess of the Trinity at Caen
- Jean (15 June 1496 – last mentioned in November 1496)
- Quiteria (1499 – September/October 1536), abbess at Montivilliers
- a stillborn son in 1500
- Andrew Phoebus (14 October 1501 – 17 April 1503)
- Henry II (18 April 1503 – 25 May 1555), King of Navarre
- Buenaventura (14 July 1505 – 1510/1511)
- Martin (c. 1506 – last mentioned in 1512)
- Francis (1508 – last mentioned in 1512)
- Charles (12 December 1510 – September 1528), captured during the Siege of Naples and died as a prisoner of war
- Isabella (1513/1514 – last mentioned in 1555), married to Rene I, Viscount of Rohan

== Sources ==
- Anthony, R. (1931). Identification et Étude des Ossements des Rois de Navarre inhumés dans la Cathédrale de Lescar [Identification and Study of the Bones of the Kings of Navarre buried in the Cathedral of Lescar] (PDF). Archives du Muséum, 6e series (in French). Vol. VII. Masson et Cie.
- Boase, Roger (2017). Secrets of Pinar's Game: Court Ladies and Courtly Verse in Fifteenth-Century Spain. Vol. 1. Brill. ISBN 9789004338364.
- Harris, Robin (1994). Valois Guyenne: A Study of Politics, Government, and Society in Late Medieval France. The Boydell Press.
- Kastrexana, Joxerra Bustillo (2012). Guía de la conquista de Navarra en 12 escenarios (in Spanish). Txertoa Argitaletxea. ISBN 978-84-71484819.
- Reulos, Michel; Bietenholz, Peter G. (2003). "John d'Albret king of Navarre". In Bietenholz, Peter G.; Deutscher, Thomas B. (eds.). Contemporaries of Erasmus: A Biographical Register of the Renaissance and Reformation. Vol. 1–3. University of Toronto Press. ISBN 9780802085771.
- Vernier, Richard (2008). Lord of the Pyrenees: Gaston Fébus, Count of Foix (1331-1391). The Boydell Press.
- Woodacre, Elena (2013). The Queens Regnant of Navarre. Palgrave Macmillan.

John III of Navarre House of Albret Born: 1469 Died: June 14 1516
Preceded by Catherine as sole queen	King of Navarre; Count of Foix; 1484 – 14 June 1516 with Catherine	Succeeded by Catherine as sole queen
Preceded by Frances	Count of Périgord; Viscount of Limoges; 1481 – 1516	Succeeded by Henry
