= Battle of Noáin =

1521 battle during the Spanish conquest of Iberian Navarre

Battle of Noain-Esquiroz
- Part of the Italian War of 1521–1526
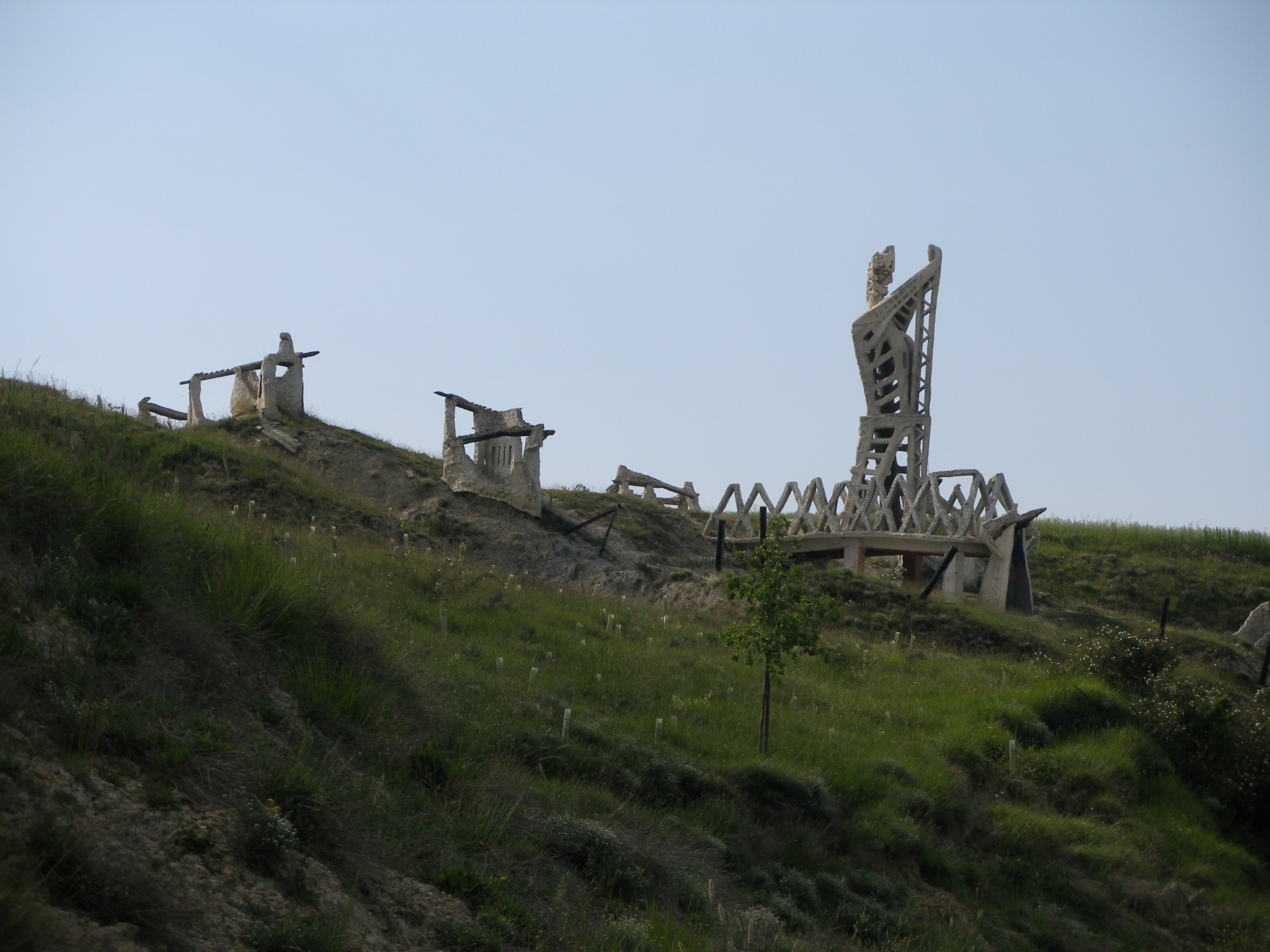
- Present day monument on the battlefield.
| Date | 30 June 1521 |
| Location | Noáin, Navarre, Spain 42°45′29″N 1°39′14″W |
| Result | Spanish victory |

Belligerents
| Castille and Aragon | Kingdom of France; Kingdom of Navarre |

Commanders and leaders
| Iñigo Fernández de Velasco; Antonio Manrique de Lara | André de Foix |

Strength
| More than 13,000 | Around 7,000 |

Casualties and losses
| 1,000 dead | 5,000+ casualties |
- Location within Spain

The Battle of Noáin or the Battle of Esquiroz, fought on 30 June 1521 was the only open field battle in the Spanish conquest of Iberian Navarre. It was a decisive victory for the Spanish against the Franco-Navarrese army.

== Prelude ==
Navarre had been invaded and occupied by Ferdinand II of Aragon in 1512, and was annexed to Castile in 1515, so becoming a kingdom part of the Crown of Castile. After John III's 1516 failed reconquest attempt, his son and legitimate heir apparent to the throne of Navarre, Henry II, saw an opportunity to reconquer the kingdom now that the Castilian army was busy dealing with the Revolt of the Comuneros.

He sent a large French/Navarrese army commanded by General André de Foix, Lord of Lesparre, (or Asparros or Esparre) across the Pyrenees, consisting of 9,000 infantry, 300 mounted knights, and 11 pieces of artillery. With the support of the population, in less than three weeks, all of Navarre was recovered. The only opposition came from Ignatius of Loyola's Castilian garrison of Pamplona. He in turn was severely wounded, trying in vain to defend the city castle. The army then moved into Castile, besieging Logroño.

In the meantime the Revolt of the Comuneros had been crushed at the Battle of Villalar in April, and the Spanish were able to gather a huge army of 25,000 men and moved on Navarre. On 11 June Lesparre abandoned his siege of Logroño and retreated back into Navarre. On 30 June both armies met in front of Pamplona.

== Battle ==
The battle was fought in the extended plains between Noáin and Pamplona. The Spanish troops had grown to more than 13,000 men under command of Iñigo Fernández de Velasco, Constable of Castile and the Duke of Nájera, viceroy of Navarre.

Despite being seriously outnumbered 2 to 1, the Franco-Navarrese attacked, surprising the Spanish and gaining some initial success. But then Fadrique Enríquez, Admiral of Castile, moved his cavalry across the Sierra de Erreniega and fell upon the Franco-Navarrese rear guard.

The bloody battle continued for several hours, but finally the bulk of the Franco-Navarrese was forced to surrender after suffering an estimated 1,500 casualties. André de Foix, wounded in the eyes, was amongst the prisoners. He was later released for a large ransom.

== Aftermath ==
This battle decided for good the future of Navarre as part of the Kingdom of Spain. The rest of the country was reconquered in the following days without meeting any resistance. Lower Navarre remained out of the reach of the Spanish at first, but suffered further Spanish inroads and on-off occupation during the next 7 years. In September 1521, Bonnivet, admiral of France, and King of Navarre Henry II backed by Francis I of France struck back with another mixed Franco-Navarrese expedition, this time targeting north of Navarre (Baztan), and Navarre's way out to the ocean, Hondarribia (Fuenterrabía), between 1521 and 1524, but without permanent success. Navarre remained a matter of international dispute and home to sporadic cross-border clashes still for a century, up to the reign of Henry III of Navarre (Henry IV of France).

There is today a monument on the battlefield, where on the last Sunday of June, supporters for the independence of Navarre meet every year.

== Sources ==
- Tucker, Spencer C., ed. (2011). A Global Chronology of Conflict:From the Ancient World to the Modern Middle East. Vol. II. ABC-CLIO.
- Monteano P. (2010). La Guerra de Navarra. Crónica de la conquista española (1512-1529). Pamiela.
