= Siege of Fuenterrabía (1523–1524) =

Battle of the Italian Wars, 1523–24

- Part of the Italian War of 1521–26
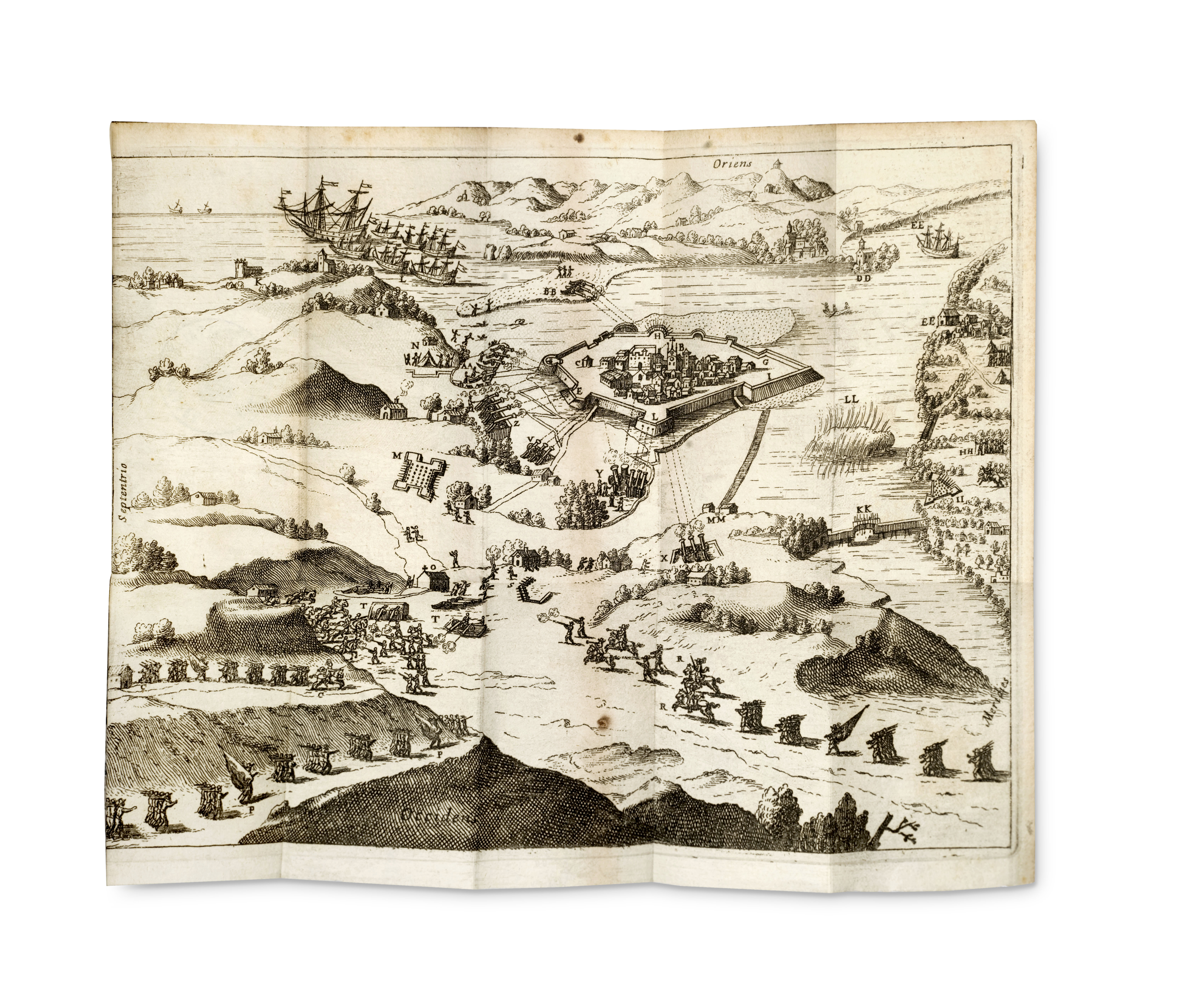
Date	1523–1524
Location	Fuenterrabía 43°21′45″N 1°47′29″W
Result	Imperial–Spanish victory

Belligerents
Spanish Empire	Kingdom of France; Kingdom of Navarre

Commanders and leaders
Beltrán de la Cueva; Íñigo Fernández de Velasco	Jacques D'Aillon
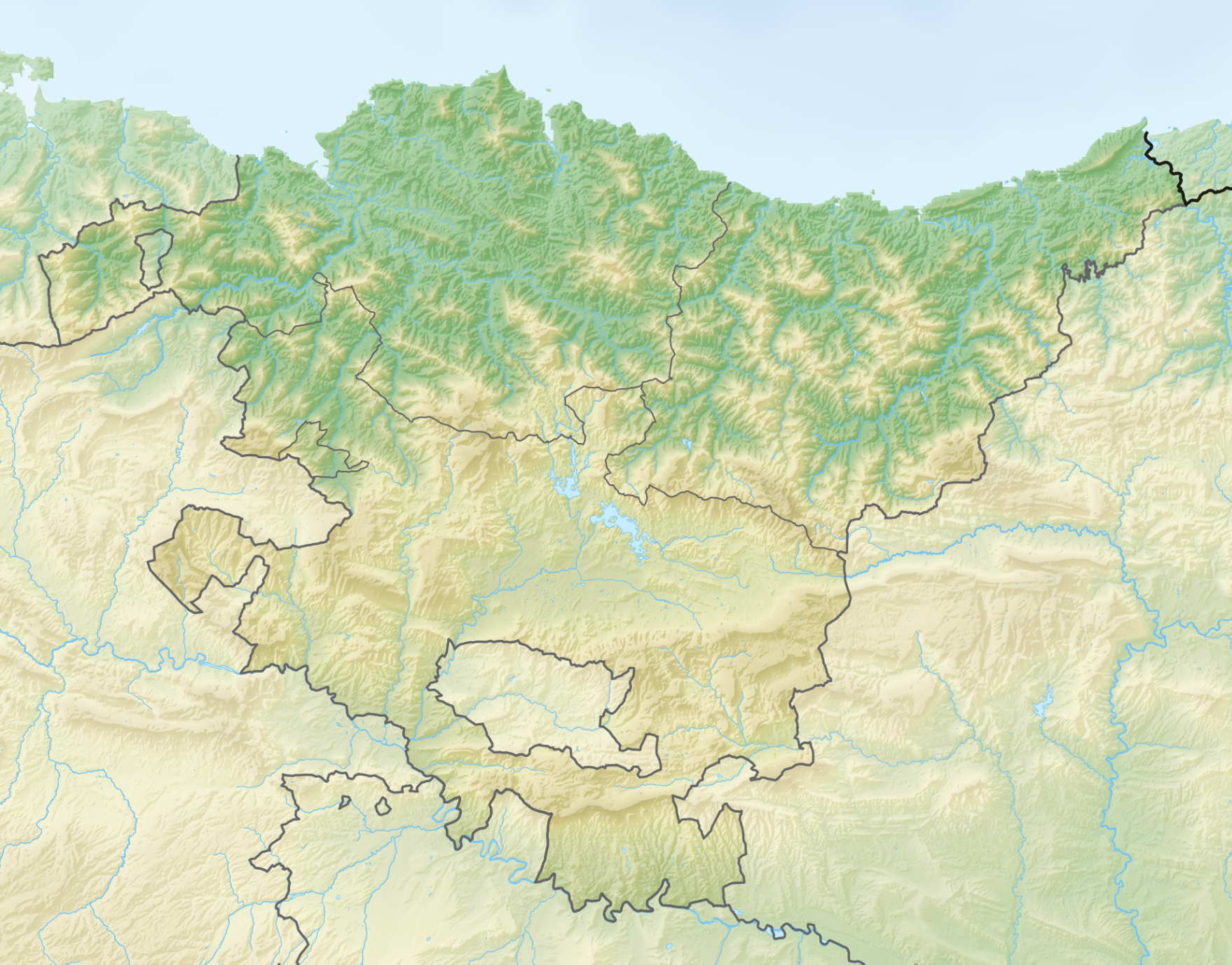
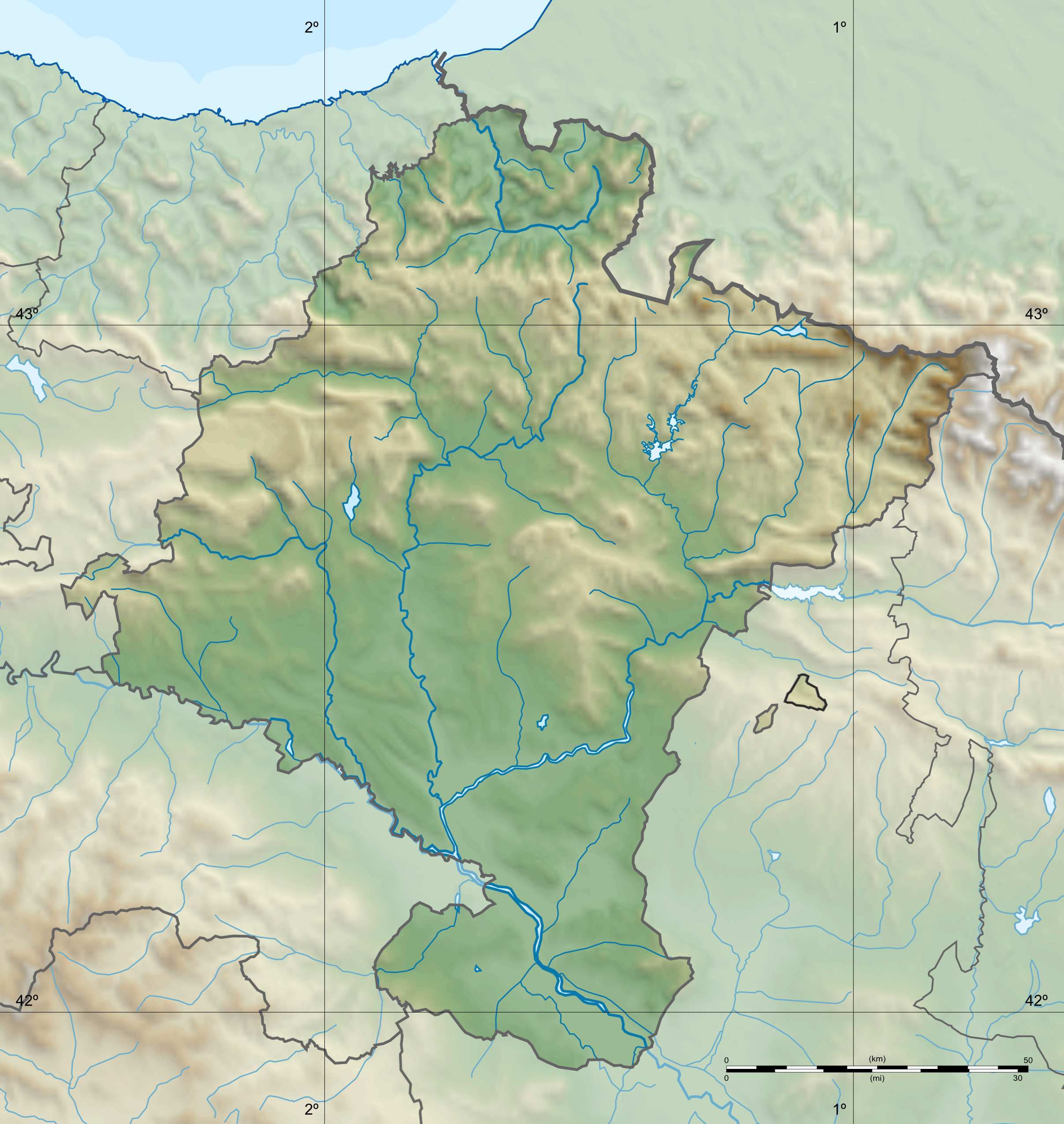
- Location within the Basque Country Siege of Fuenterrabía (1523–1524) (Navarre) Siege of Fuenterrabía (1523–1524) (Spain)

The siege of Fuenterrabía took place in 1523-24 by a Spanish army, after a Franco-Navarrese army had taken it in 1521 in a new incursion to reconquer the Kingdom of Navarre, which had been occupied since 1512 by troops from the unified Crown of Castile and Crown of Aragon.

The Fuenterrabía of the 16th century also included most of the municipal term of the current city of Irun, the municipality of Lezo, and parts of Hendaye, Urruña (Behovia neighborhood) and Pasajes (Pasajes de San Juan). The town and fortress were located on a hill surrounded by thick walls, mountains and the sea at the mouth of the Bidasoa River.

Its border situation and its geographic characteristics made both Charles V, Holy Roman Emperor and Francis I of France covet its possession. For this reason, both nations appointed commissioners to elucidate the exact water border in the conflicts of the towns of Fuenterrabía and Hendaye, something that until then had been solved by agreement.

In 1512, the first Franco-Navarrese counteroffensive was carried out to recover the kingdom of Navarre after its invasion by the Crowns of Castile and Aragon, in which Marshal Pedro de Navarre with 2000 men within the contingent of Lautrec were stopped by Luis I de la Cueva, II Lord of Solera. To prevent another invasion, the fortification proceeded, ordering in November of that year the construction of a castle in Behovia, which reinforced the effectiveness of the Fuenterrabía fort.

As of 1517, the territorial rights of the area were defined by law by the two kingdoms, that of Spain and that of France, leaving the old Kingdom of Navarre divided.

== Franco-Navarre offensive ==
At the beginning of October 1521 the castle of Behovia was taken by the troops commanded by the French Admiral Guillermo Goufier, Lord of Bonnivet, with hardly any casualties, since little resistance was offered. He next surrounded the fortress of Fuenterrabía on October 6, taking it twelve days later, after three assaults by Navarrese and Gascon volunteers, among which nearly a thousand casualties occurred. Diego de Vera, warden of the plaza, surrendered on October 18.

The Lord of Bonnivent established a garrison with 3,000 men, who were 2,000 Gascons and 1,000 Navarrese under the orders of Jacques D'Aillon, Lord of Luda, who remained as mayor of the square "in the name of the King of Navarre". For this reason, the flag of Navarre was waving throughout the siege, despite the intention of the French to raise their flag.

Charles V requested the arbitration of King Henry VIII of England to intervene before Francis I and ask him to return the fortress. Knowledge of these conversations by the Navarrese was decisive for the replacement of the garrison months later.

== Spanish siege of the fortress ==
Beltrán de la Cueva, 3rd Duke of Alburquerque, was appointed, on May 23, 1522, new captain general of Gipuzkoa, although he had already held the position previously. He received a significant increase in troops from different places, between 3000 and 4,000 German Landsknechts, and soldiers recruited in Castile, Navarre, Aragón, Vizcaya, La Rioja and Álava.

Faced with the difficulties in defending the castle of Behovia, the French army decided to abandon it. The withdrawal was carried out correctly, taking the cannons, weapons, and provisions. Later, different explosive charges were arranged to destroy its walls, but its fuses were extinguished by the Castilian troops under the command of Captain Ochoa Sanz de Asua, who took the castle.

Two days later, the Battle of Mount Aldabe or San Marcial took place.

In July 1522, the troops in the fortress Fuenterrabía considered to surrender due to starvation. After ten months without being supplied, deaths from starvation began to occur. But then French troops, after crossing the Bidasoa and making the Imperial troops flee, were able to supply the fortress and renew the garrison. For this reason, Beltrán de la Cueva was dismissed, and was replaced by Íñigo Fernández de Velasco, Constable of Castile.

The French naval control of the fortress' harbor allowed the supply to be maintained. Throughout the siege, the red flag of Navarre flew in the fortress, although the French tried to impose theirs.

In the winter of 1523–1524, a great offensive was organized by Emperor Charles V against Francis I, to occupy Toulouse, Lower Navarre, Bayonne and Fuenterrabia. This campaign failed after 24 days with the loss of a quarter of the army due to desertions and disease. The remaining troops regrouped and joined the bulk of the army surrounding Fuenterrabía.

On 2 February 1524, the bombardment of the fortress began and negotiations for surrender began. On 27 February the French abandoned the fortress, leaving only Navarrese soldiers, the most notable being Pedro de Navarre, son of Marshal Pedro de Navarra who had been killed in strange circumstances, presumably assassinated, in the Simancas prison in 1522.

On 29 February 1524, pardon was granted to the surrounded Navarrese garrison, with the condition that within two months they surrendered and gave an oath and loyalty to Charles V. The fortress was surrendered on 29 April.
