= André de Foix =

French general

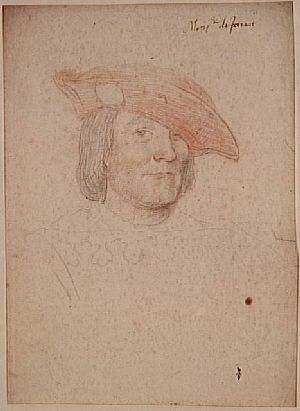
André de Foix, by Jean Clouet

André de Foix, Seigneur de Lesparre (or Asparroz or Asparrots), (1490–1547) was a French General.

André was the son of Jean de Foix, Viscount of Lautrec and governor of the Dauphiné, and of Jeanne d'Aydie de Lescun. His sister was Françoise de Foix, mistress of King Francis I of France. His brothers Odet of Foix, Viscount of Lautrec and Thomas, seigneur de Lescun, were also promoted to high positions in the military by the King, by the influence of Françoise.

After the Spanish conquest of Iberian Navarre in 1512, he was appointed in 1521 by Henry II of Navarre commander of a Gascoigne-Navarrese army, to try for the third time to recapture the Kingdom of Navarre. At first, the campaign was successful and Navarre was recaptured in May, but on June 30, 1521, Lesparre's army suffered a crushing defeat in the Battle of Noáin against the Spanish. 5.000 men were lost and Lesparre himself was wounded and captured, but later released for ransom.

He died in the Italian Wars.

== Sources ==
- Téllez Alarcia, Diego (2023). "André de Foix, señor de Asparros: el general que sitió Logroño (junio de 1521)". Berceo (184): 155–190. ISSN 0210-8550.
