= Luxe-Sumberraute =

Luxe-Sumberraute Lüküze-Altzumarta
- Commune
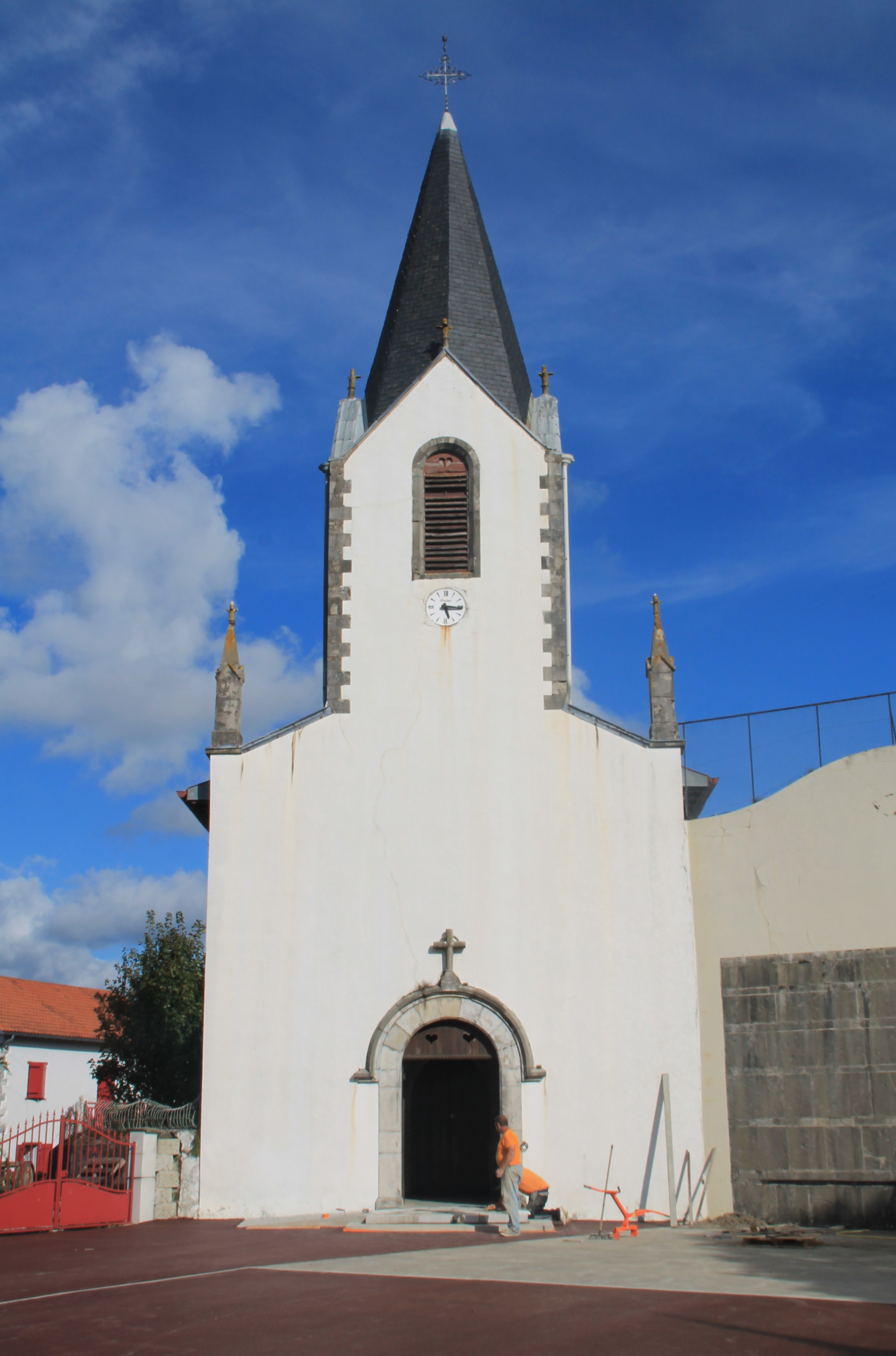
- The church of Luxe-Sumberraute

- Coat of arms
- Location of Luxe-Sumberraute
- Location within France Location within Nouvelle-Aquitaine
- Coordinates: 43°20′47″N 1°04′30″W
- Country: France
- Region: Nouvelle-Aquitaine
- Department: Pyrénées-Atlantiques
- Arrondissement: Bayonne
- Canton: Pays de Bidache, Amikuze et Ostibarre
- Intercommunality: CA Pays Basque

Government
  - Mayor (2020–2026): Patrick Bizos
- Area^{1}: 8.31 km^{2} (3.21 sq mi)
- Elevation: 100 m (330 ft)
- Highest elevation: 245 m (804 ft)
- Lowest elevation: 53 m (174 ft)
- Population (2023): 385
  - Density: 46.3/km^{2} (120/sq mi)
- Time zone: UTC+01:00 (CET)
  - Summer (DST): UTC+02:00 (CEST)
- INSEE/Postal code: 64362 /64120
- ^{1} French Land Register data, which excludes lakes, ponds, glaciers > 1 km^{2} (0.386 sq mi or 247 acres) and river estuaries.

Luxe-Sumberraute (French pronunciation: [lyks sœ̃beʁot]; Occitan: Lus-Sombriér; Basque: Lüküze-Altzumarta) is a commune in the Pyrénées-Atlantiques department in south-western France.

It is located in the former province of Lower Navarre.

== See also ==
- Communes of the Pyrénées-Atlantiques department
