= Henry II of Navarre =

King of Navarre from 1517 to 1555

Henry II
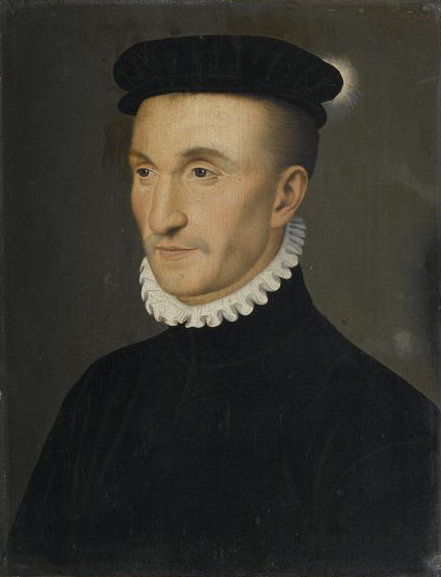
- Portrait by unknown French artist

King of Navarre
- Reign: 12 February 1517 – 24/25 May 1555
- Predecessor: Catherine
- Successor: Jeanne III and Antoine
- Born: 18 April 1503; Sangüesa
- Died: 24/5 May 1555 (aged 52); Hagetmau
- Spouse: Margaret of Angoulême (m. 1526; died 1549)
- Issue more...: Jeanne III
- House: Albret
- Father: John of Albret
- Mother: Catherine of Navarre
- Religion: Roman Catholic, although strongly sympathized with Calvinists throughout his life

Henry II (Spanish: Enrique II; Basque: Henrike II; 18 April 1503 – 24/5 May 1555), nicknamed Sangüesino because he was born in Sangüesa, was the King of Navarre from 1517. The kingdom had been reduced to a small territory north of the Pyrenees mountains by the Spanish conquest of 1512. Henry succeeded his mother, Queen Catherine, upon her death. His father was her husband and co-ruler, King John III, who died in 1516.

== Early life ==
Henry was the son of King John III and Queen Catherine. His father died in 1516. His mother died on 12 February 1517 and Henry ascended the throne of Navarre. Since he was 14 years old, his sister Anne of Navarre functioned as his regent until he was 15 and was declared of legal majority on 18 April 1518. As Henry was often absent from Navarre, his sister Anne continued to act as his regent during his absences.

== King of Navarre ==
After the failed reconquest attempt of Navarre in 1516, John III died, followed by Catherine I's demise in her independent dependencies of Béarn one year later, in 1517. Heir apparent Henry was proclaimed King of Navarre, and was lavishly crowned in Lescar. The title was also claimed by Ferdinand II of Aragon, who had invaded the realm in 1512 and usurped the title, and the claim was continued by his grandson Charles V. Henry II enjoyed the protection of Francis I of France.

A French and Navarrese expedition made another attempt at reconquering occupied Navarre, conquered Pamplona in May 1521, but were ultimately repelled by Charles after the Battle of Noain in June 1521.

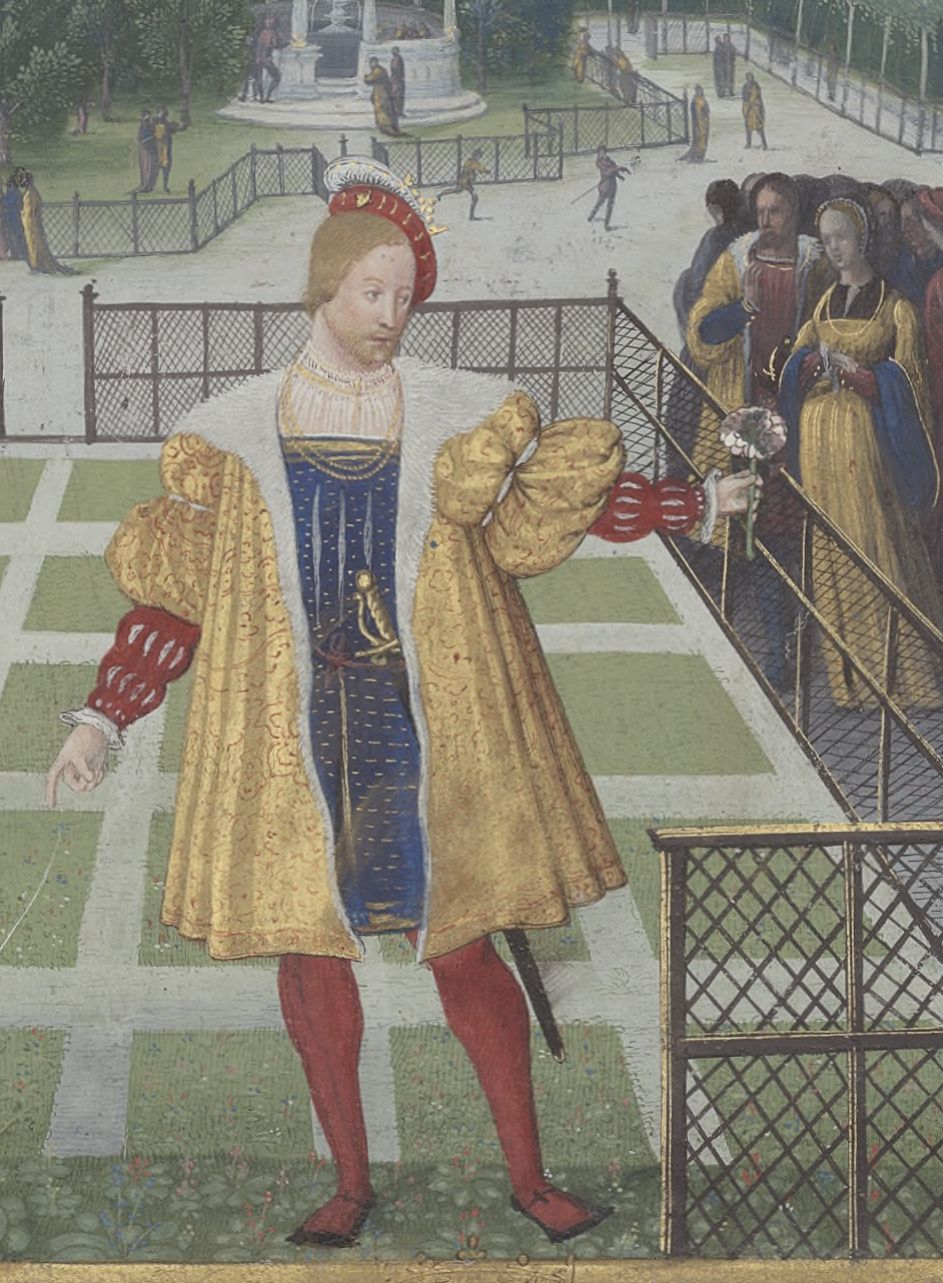
Henry in contemporary miniature

In 1525, Henry was taken prisoner during the Battle of Pavia, but he managed to escape and in 1526, married Margaret, the sister of King Francis I of France and the widow of Charles, Duke of Alençon. In 1530, after the Treaty of Cambrai between Castile and France, Charles V evacuated the northernmost county (merindad) of Navarre, Lower Navarre, allowing Henry to seize it. The Pyrenean border between Lower and Upper Navarre now constitutes the Franco-Spanish border in this sector.

Henry had some strong sympathy with the Huguenots, and was fluent in both French and Spanish, according to the seigneur de Brantôme. He died at Hagetmau on 24/5 May 1555.

== Marriage ==
In 1526, Henry married Marguerite of Angouleme. They had:

- Jeanne III of Navarre (16 November 1528 – 9 June 1572); mother of Henry IV of France
- John (7 July 1530 – 25 December 1530)

== Sources ==
- Boureau, Alain (1998). The Lord's First Night: The Myth of the Droit de Cuissage. University of Chicago Press. ISBN 9780226067438.
- Bryson, David (1999). Queen Jeanne and the Promised Land: Dynasty, Homeland, Religion and Violence in Sixteenth-Century France. Brill. ISBN 9789004247512.
- Cholakian, Patricia Francis; Cholakian, Rouben Charles (2006). Marguerite de Navarre: Mother of the Renaissance. Columbia University Press.
- Hillgarth, J. N. (2000). The Mirror of Spain, 1500–1700: The Formation of a Myth. University of Michigan.
- Knecht, Robert J. (2008). The French Renaissance Court, 1483-1589. Yale University Press. ISBN 9780300118513.
- Lynch, Margaret E. (2000). "Margaret of Angouleme (1492-1549)". In Commire, Anne; Klezmer, Deborah (eds.). Women in World History. Vol. 10. Yorkin Publications. pp. 243–251.
- Reulos, Michel; Bietenholz, Peter G. (2003). "John d'Albret king of Navarre". In Bietenholz, Peter G.; Deutscher, Thomas B. (eds.). Contemporaries of Erasmus: A Biographical Register of the Renaissance and Reformation. Vol. 1–3. University of Toronto Press. ISBN 9780802085771.
- Roelker, Nancy Lyman (1968). Queen of Navarre: Jeanne d'Albret 1528-1572. Harvard University Press.
- Stephenson, Barbara (2017). The Power and Patronage of Marguerite de Navarre. Routledge.
- Tucker, Spencer C., ed. (2011). A Global Chronology of Conflict:From the Ancient World to the Modern Middle East. Vol. II. ABC-CLIO.
- Vernier, Richard (2008). Lord of the Pyrenees: Gaston Fébus, Count of Foix (1331-1391). The Boydell Press.

Henry II of Navarre House of Albret Born: April 18 1503 Died: May 25 1555
Regnal titles
Preceded by Catherine	King of Navarre; Count of Foix; 1517 – 24/25 May 1555	Succeeded by Jeanne III
