= 1479 =

1479 in various calendars
- Gregorian calendar: 1479; MCDLXXIX
- Ab urbe condita: 2232
- Armenian calendar: 928; ԹՎ ՋԻԸ
- Assyrian calendar: 6229
- Balinese saka calendar: 1400–1401
- Bengali calendar: 885–886
- Berber calendar: 2429
- English Regnal year: 18 Edw. 4 – 19 Edw. 4
- Buddhist calendar: 2023
- Burmese calendar: 841
- Byzantine calendar: 6987–6988
- Chinese calendar: 戊戌年 (Earth Dog); 4176 or 3969 — to — 己亥年 (Earth Pig); 4177 or 3970
- Coptic calendar: 1195–1196
- Discordian calendar: 2645
- Ethiopian calendar: 1471–1472
- Hebrew calendar: 5239–5240
- Hindu calendars
- Vikram Samvat: 1535–1536
- Shaka Samvat: 1400–1401
- Kali Yuga: 4579–4580
- Holocene calendar: 11479
- Igbo calendar: 479–480
- Iranian calendar: 857–858
- Islamic calendar: 883–884
- Japanese calendar: Bunmei 11 (文明１１年)
- Javanese calendar: 1395–1396
- Julian calendar: 1479; MCDLXXIX
- Korean calendar: 3812
- Minguo calendar: 433 before ROC 民前433年
- Nanakshahi calendar: 11
- Thai solar calendar: 2021–2022
- Tibetan calendar: ས་ཕོ་ཁྱི་ལོ་ (male Earth-Dog); 1605 or 1224 or 452 — to — ས་མོ་ཕག་ལོ་ (female Earth-Boar); 1606 or 1225 or 453

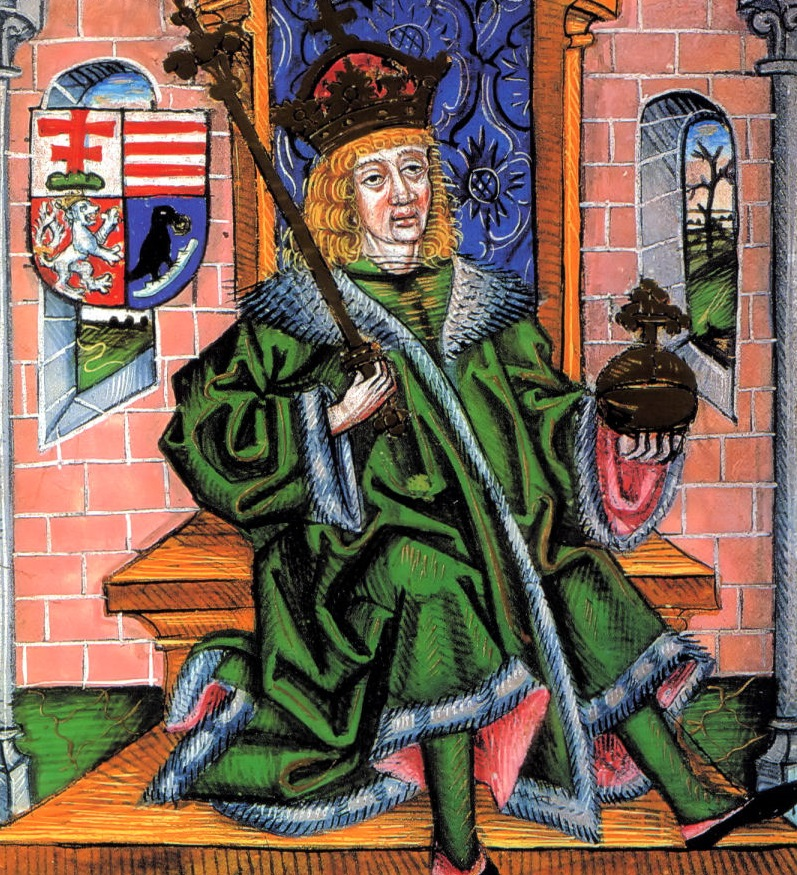
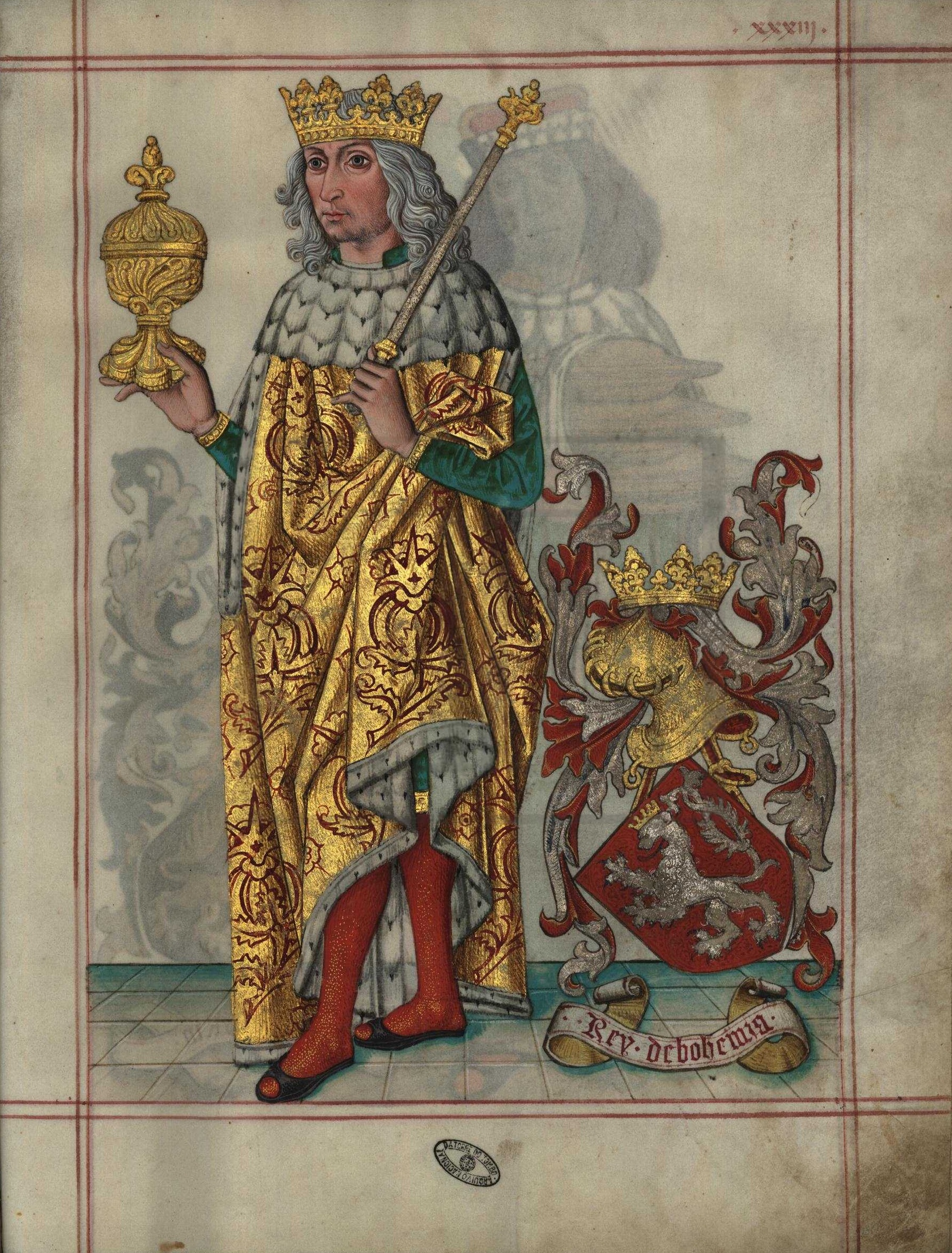
July 21: Matthias Corvinus of Hungary and Vladislaus II of Bohemia meet in Bohemia to ratify the Peace of Olomouc.

Year 1479 (MCDLXXIX) was a common year starting on Friday of the Julian calendar.

== Events ==
=== January–March ===
- January 20 – Ferdinand II already co-ruler of Crown of Castile with his wife, Isabella I, becomes the King of Aragon upon the death of his father, King John II of Aragon and Navarre. He and Isabella rule together over Aragon and Castile, unifying the two monarchies and controlling most of the Iberian Peninsula. At the same time, King John's daughter, Leonor de Trastámara, who had served as regent during times when her father was away fighting in war, becomes Queen of Navarre.
- January 25 – The Treaty of Constantinople is signed between the Ottoman Empire and Republic of Venice, ending 16 years of war between the two powers; Venice will cede Negroponte, Lemnos and Shkodër, and pay an annual sum of 10,000 gold ducats.
- January 28 – Leonor de Trastamara, who had served as regent of the Kingdom of Navarre in Spain during the absence of her father, John II, is crowned at Tudela. She dies 15 days later at the age of 53.
- February 12 – Francisco Febo becomes the King of Navarre at the age of 11 upon the death of his grandmother, Queen Leonor (whose late son Gaston de Foix was Francisco's father). Francisco's mother, Magdalena of Valois, serves as regent.
- March 26 – Matthias Corvinus, King of Hungary, concludes a treaty with the Swiss Confederacy hindering the recruitment of Swiss mercenaries by the Emperor.

=== April–June ===
- April 2 – The Peace of Olomouc is signed between King Matthias Corvinus of Hungary and King Vladislaus II of Bohemia, bringing the Bohemian–Hungarian War (1468–1478) to an end.
- April 25 – The ratification of the Treaty of Constantinople in Venice ends the Siege of Shkodra after fifteen months, and brings all of Albania under the Ottoman Empire.
- May 13 – Christopher Columbus, an experienced mariner and successful trader in the thriving Genoese expatriate community in Portugal, marries Felipa Perestrelo Moniz (Italian on her father's side), and receives as dowry her late father's maps and papers, charting the seas and winds around the Madeira Islands, and other Portuguese possessions in the Ocean Sea.
- June 1 – The University of Copenhagen is inaugurated by King Christian I of Denmark, seven months after he had issued a royal decree on October 4 establishing its creation.

=== July–September ===
- July 21 – The Peace of Olomouc is ratified by King Matthias and King Vladislaus during festivities in Olomouc.
- August 7 – The Battle of Guinegate is fought in the Duchy of Burgundy at what is now the French town of Enguinegatte, as at least 12,000 French infantry, 4,000 cavalry and 8,000 archers commanded by Philippe de Crèvecœur d'Esquerdes are confronted by Maximilian, Duke of Burgundy whose 16,000 men have superior weapons, including the pike. With 11,000 troops grouped in formations of 100 men apiece using the pike square formation" borrowed from Switzerland, the Burgundian troops defeat the French invasion.
- September 4 – The Treaty of Alcáçovas (also known as the Treaty or Peace of Alcáçovas-Toledo) is signed between the Catholic Monarchs of Castile and Aragon on one side, and the King of Portugal and his son on the other side, ending the four-year War of the Castilian Succession.

=== October–December ===
- October 13 – In the Battle of the Breadfield, the army of the Kingdom of Hungary, led by Pál Kinizsi and István Báthory, defeats the army of the Ottoman Empire and Transylvania and Hungary, leaving at least 10,000 Ottoman Turks dead.
- November 5 – Grand Admiral Gedik Ahmed Pasha of the Ottoman Navy gives the order to ravage the Greek island of Zakynthos, at the time a territory of the Republic of Venice, and the Ottoman troops destroy most of the island's churches and monasteries and many of its dwellings.
- December 19 – The surviving suspect in the Pazzi conspiracy and April 26, 1478, assassination of Giuliano de' Medici in the Republic of Florence, is executed after being returned to Florence by order of the Ottoman Sultan Mehmed II. The conspirator, Bernardo Bandini dei Baroncelli, is hanged from a window of the Palazzo del Popolo, Florence's "Palace of the People".

=== Ongoing ===
- The plague breaks out in Florence.
- Johann Neumeister prints a new edition of Juan de Torquemada's Meditations, or the Contemplations of the Most Devout.

== Births ==
- March 12 – Giuliano de' Medici, Duke of Nemours (d. 1516)
- March 13 – Lazarus Spengler, German hymnwriter (d. 1534)
- March 20 – Ippolito d'Este, Italian Catholic cardinal (d. 1520)
- March 25 – Vasili III of Russia, Grand Prince of Moscow (d. 1533)
- May 3 – Henry V, Duke of Mecklenburg (d. 1552)
- May 5 – Guru Amar Das, third Sikh Guru (d. 1574)
- May 12 – Pompeo Colonna, Italian Catholic cardinal (d. 1532)
- June 14 – Giglio Gregorio Giraldi, Italian scholar and poet (d. 1552)
- June 15 – Lisa del Giocondo, Florentine noblewoman believed to be the subject of the Mona Lisa (d. 1542)
- August 14 – Catherine of York, English princess, aunt of Henry VIII (d. 1527)
- September 17 – Celio Calcagnini, Italian astronomer (d. 1541)
- October 28 – John Gage, English courtier of the Tudor period (d. 1556)
- November 6
  - Joanna of Castile, Queen of Philip the Handsome, daughter of Isabella I of Castile and Ferdinand II of Aragon (d. 1555)
  - Philip I, Margrave of Baden (d. 1533)
- December – Ayşe Hafsa Sultan, Ottoman Valide Sultan (d. 1534)
- date unknown
  - Johann Cochlaeus, German humanist and controversialist (d. 1552)
  - Vallabhacharya, Indian founder of the Vallabha sect of Hinduism (d. 1531)
- probable – Henry Stafford, 1st Earl of Wiltshire (d. 1522)

== Deaths ==
- January 18 – Louis IX, Duke of Bavaria (b. 1417)
- January 20 – King John II of Aragon (b. 1397)
- February – Antonello da Messina, Italian painter (b. c. 1430)
- February 10 – Catherine of Cleves, duchess consort regent of Guelders (b. 1417)
- February 12 – Eleanor of Navarre, queen regnant of Navarre (b. 1426)
- April 24 – Jorge Manrique, Spanish poet (b. 1440)
- June 11 – John of Sahagún, Spanish Augustinian friar, priest and saint (b. 1419)
- September 10 – Jacopo Piccolomini-Ammannati, Italian Catholic cardinal (b. 1422)
- September 18 – Fulk Bourchier, 10th Baron FitzWarin, English baron (b. 1445)
- November 6 – James Hamilton, 1st Lord Hamilton
- date unknown
  - Johanne Andersdatter Sappi, Danish noble (b. 1400)
  - Ólöf Loftsdóttir, politically active Icelandic woman (b. c. 1410)
