= Treaty of Blois of 1512 =

The Treaty of Blois of 1512 was a treaty signed on 18 July 1512 in Blois, France, between the Kingdom of France and the Kingdom of Navarre. The treaty was agreed upon when the Spanish forces were beginning the Conquest of Navarre, a subject of much debate among historians.

== Content of the Treaty ==
- First article: An agreement was made not to attack each other and to help against common enemies ("friend of a friend, enemy of an enemy"), while respecting each other's territorial sovereignty.
- Second article: Both parties agreed not to allow armies attacking the other kingdom to pass through their territories.
- Third article: The treaty considered the commercial freedom of both crowns, by sea and land, and the rights of merchants.
- Fourth and fifth articles: Each party was required to participate in the treaties of friendship and alliance signed by the other.
- Sixth and seventh articles: The King of Navarre had to consider the English as enemies and fight them if they invaded France.
- Eighth and final article: An alliance between the kings of Aragon, Castile, and Navarre (ci-devant á été faite Alliance) was recognized.

== Interpretation of the Treaty ==
In the early 16th century, the main rivals for dominance in European politics were the Kingdom of France and the Catholic Monarchs who united the Crown of Castile and the Crown of Aragon. The Kingdom of Navarre, both politically and geographically, was situated between these two powers and tried to maintain neutrality.

However, both monarchs had their own view of the small Pyrenean kingdom. In 1510, Louis XII of France began intrigues to dominate Navarre, citing the territories of the Counts of Foix and the Labrit lineage in France as a pretext. Similarly, Ferdinand II of Aragon, as made clear by the Treaty of Valencia, did not recognize the rights of Catherine of Navarre and sought to take over the kingdom.

Throughout 1511, Louis XII and Maximilian I, Holy Roman Emperor waged war against the Holy See and the Crown of Castile and Crown of Aragon in Italy. John III of Navarre and Catherine of Navarre tried to maintain their neutrality. After the death of Gaston de Foix on 11 April in the Battle of Ravenna, the Navarrese attempted to sign treaties with both sides, but Ferdinand of Aragon saw the Franco-Navarrese treaty as a threat and accelerated preparations for the Conquest of Navarre.

From the perspective of nationalist Spanish historians, John III of Navarre misinterpreted the situation in European politics and, impressed by Gaston de Foix's success in Italy, decided to sign the treaty with Louis XII. Ferdinand the Catholic, who was then regent of the Crown of Castile, took this alliance as a casus belli and ordered the invasion of Navarre. However, this theory lacks solid support, as on 10 July, eight days before the treaty was signed, the Castilians had already attacked Goizueta. To explain this date discrepancy, these historians rely on differences between the Florentine and Gregorian calendars.

Historians with a nationalist or pro-Navarrese viewpoint argue, however, that Ferdinand the Catholic needed a pretext to invade Navarre. They claim that on 12 July he publicly presented a supposed Treaty of Blois, which had no connection to the one actually signed on 18 July.

In any case, using this treaty and the papal bull Pastor Ille Caelestis issued by Pope Julius II as a pretext, on 21 July 1512, the Duke of Alba entered Navarre with the Castilian army through Burunda, and by September, most of the kingdom, except for Lower Navarre, had been conquered.
