= John of Foix, Viscount of Narbonne =

John of Foix
- Count of Étampes; Viscount of Narbonne
- Born: 1450
- Died: 1500 (aged 49–50); Étampes, France
- Spouse: Marie of Orléans
- Issue: Germaine, Queen of Aragon; Gaston, Duke of Nemours
- House: Foix
- Father: Gaston IV, Count of Foix
- Mother: Eleanor, Queen of Navarre

John of Foix (1450 – 1500, Étampes, France) was a younger son of Count Gaston IV of Foix and Queen Eleanor of Navarre. His elder brother was Gaston, Prince of Viana.

== Life ==
He received the Viscounty of Narbonne from his father. He was on good terms with both Louis XI of France and Louis XII of France. He married Marie of Orléans, sister of Louis XII, in 1483. They had two children:

- Germaine of Foix (1488–1536), who married Ferdinand II of Aragon, and whose relationship to the Navarrese throne was used as an excuse by Ferdinand to claim the throne of Navarre.
- Gaston of Foix (1489–1512), who served as a general for his uncle Louis XII, dying at the Battle of Ravenna in Italy.

Following the death of his nephew, King Francis of Navarre in 1483, John claimed Navarre as the next male in the succession, challenging Francis' sister and heiress, Queen Catherine. Although the Salic law had never been enforced in the Kingdom of Navarre, the result of this claim was a civil war in Navarre, which only ended in Catherine's favour in 1497, with John being forced to give up his claim. He died three years later.

== Ancestry ==
Ancestors of John of Foix, Viscount of Narbonne

8. Archambaud, Viscount of Castillon
4. John I, Count of Foix
9. Isabella, Countess of Foix
2. Gaston IV, Count of Foix
10. Charles I, Lord of Albret
5. Jeanne d'Albret
11. Marie de Sully
1. John, Viscount of Narbonne
12. Ferdinand I of Aragon
6. John II of Aragon
13. Eleanor of Alburquerque
3. Eleanor, Queen of Navarre
14. Charles III of Navarre
7. Blanche I of Navarre
15. Eleanor of Castile

== Sources ==
- Carroll, Stuart (2006). Blood and Violence in Early Modern France. Oxford University Press. p. 43.
- Woodacre, Elena (2013). The Queens Regnant of Navarre: Succession, Politics, and Partnership, 1274-1512. Palgrave Macmillan.
