= Navarrese Civil War (1451–1455) =

Civil wars involving the states and peoples of Europe

The Navarrese Civil War of 1451–1455 pitted John II of the Kingdom of Navarre against his son and heir-apparent, Charles IV.

When the war started, John II had been King of Navarre since 1425 through his first wife, Blanche I of Navarre, who had married him in 1420. By the marriage pact of 1419, John and Blanche's eldest son was to succeed to Navarre on Blanche's death. When Blanche died in 1441, John retained the government of her lands and dispossessed his own eldest son, Charles (born 1421), who had already been made Prince of Viana by his grandfather Charles III of Navarre in 1423. John tried to assuage his son with the lieutenancy of Navarre, but his son's French upbringing and French allies, the Beaumonteses, brought the two into conflict. John was supported by the Agramonteses.

From 1451 to 1455, they were engaged in open warfare in Navarre. Charles was defeated at the Battle of Aybar in 1452, captured, and released; and John tried to disinherit him by illegally naming his daughter Eleanor, who was married to Gaston IV of Foix, his successor. In 1451, John's new wife, Juana Enríquez, gave birth to a son, Ferdinand. In 1452, Charles fled his father first to France, where he vainly sought allies, and later to the court of his uncle, John's elder brother, Alfonso V of Aragon at Naples. Charles was popular in Spain and John was increasingly unpopular as he refused to recognise Charles as his "first born", probably planning to make Ferdinand his heir. The Navarrese Civil War presaged the Catalan Civil War of 1462–72, in which John's ill-treatment of Charles was a precipitating event.
