= Gaston of Foix =

Gaston of Foix (Gaston de Foix) may refer to:

- Gaston I of Foix-Béarn (d. 1315)
- Gaston II of Foix-Béarn (1308–1343)
- Gaston III of Foix-Béarn (1331–1391)
- Gaston IV, Count of Foix (1422–1472)
- Gaston of Foix, Prince of Viana (1444–1470)
- Gaston of Foix, Duke of Nemours (1489–1512)
- Gaston de Foix, Count of Candale (d. 1500)
