= Anne of Foix =

Queen of Bohemia and Hungary from 1502 to 1506

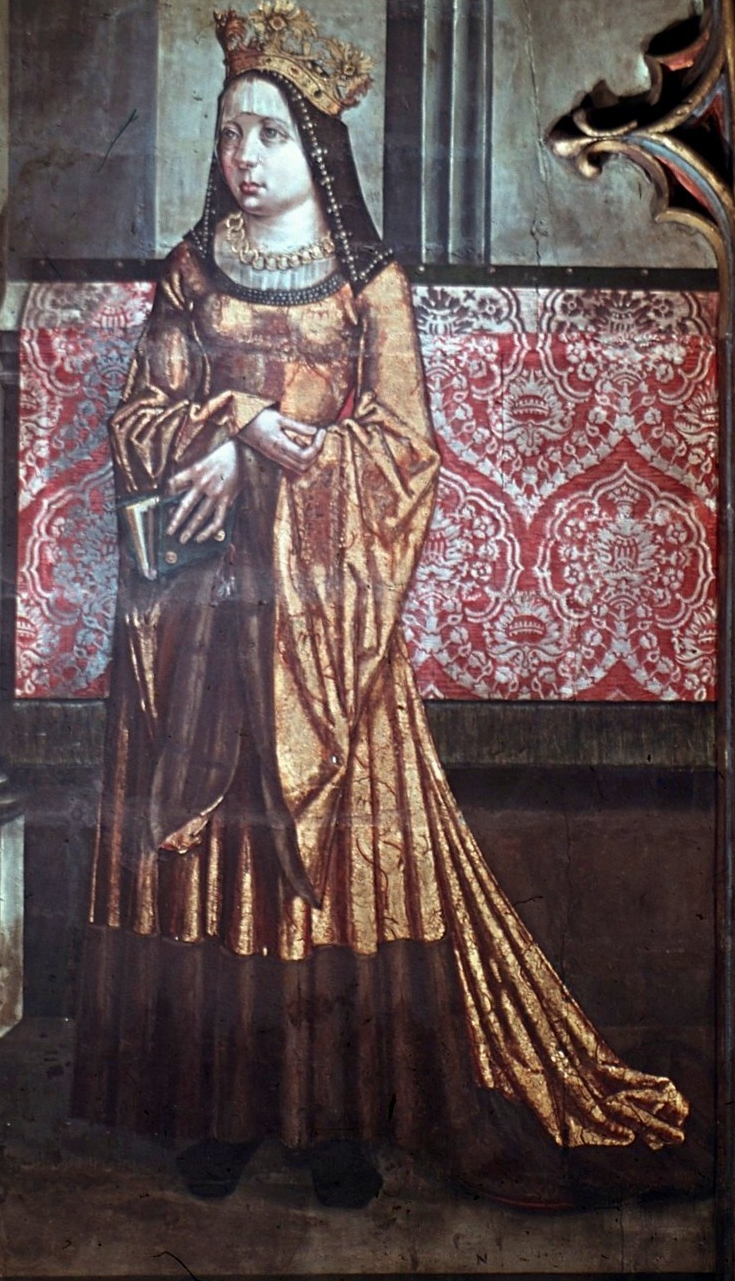
- Fresco from walls of the St. Wenceslas Chapel in St. Vitus Cathedral, Prague (1508)

Queen consort of Hungary and Bohemia
- Tenure: 1502–1506
- Coronation: 29 September 1502
- Born: 1484
- Died: 26 July 1506 (aged 21–22); Buda, Hungary
- Spouse: Vladislaus II of Hungary
- Issue: Anna, Queen of Hungary and Bohemia; Louis II, King of Hungary and Bohemia
- House: Foix
- Father: Gaston, Count of Candale
- Mother: Catherine of Foix

Anne of Foix (1484 – 26 July 1506) was Queen of Hungary and Bohemia as the third wife of King Vladislaus II.

== Biography ==
Anne was the daughter of Gaston, Count of Candale, and Catherine of Foix. Her mother was the youngest daughter of Queen Eleanor of Navarre and Gaston IV, Count of Foix. Anne grew up at the French royal court at Blois. She was educated in Latin and the Classics.

Louis I d'Orléans, Duke of Longueville, first cousin once removed of King Louis XII of France, is reported to have been in love with her and wished to marry her, but he was prevented from doing so because an illustrious political marriage was planned for Anne. The elderly, twice-divorced and childless king Vladislaus II of Hungary of the Jagiellon dynasty had been searching for a wife capable of giving him a son. His sights were set on a powerful alliance, and Anne, a member of the upper nobility of France related to several royal families, was a good choice. Anne was betrothed in 1500, a marriage contract was confirmed in 1501, and she wed Vladislaus by proxy at the French court at Blois in 1502. On her way to Hungary, she was much celebrated in Venice and other parts of Italy, causing a conflict between France and Hungary over who should pay the expenses. On 29 September 1502, Anne wed Vladislaus, this time in Székesfehérvár, and she was crowned Queen of Hungary there that same day.

Anne brought some members of the French court as well as French advisors with her to Hungary. The relationship was happy at least from the king's view, and he is reported to have regarded her as a friend, assistant and a trusted advisor. She incurred debts in Venice and was said to favour this city all her life. In 1506, her signature was placed on a document alongside the king's regarding an alliance with the Habsburgs. On 23 July 1503, Anne gave birth to a daughter, known as Anna Jagellonica, and on 1 July 1506, to the long-awaited male heir, the future king Louis II. She enjoyed great popularity, but her pregnancies ruined her health. She died in Buda on 26 July 1506, a little more than three weeks after the birth of her son due to complications from delivery. She was 22.

== Children ==
Although Anna was Vladislaus II's third wife, she gave birth to his only surviving legitimate children, both of whom were born in Buda:

- Anna of Bohemia and Hungary, later Queen consort of Hungary and Bohemia. Married Ferdinand I, Holy Roman Emperor, and they inherited Bohemia and what was left of Hungary.
- Louis II of Hungary, killed at the Battle of Mohács on 29 August 1526. Married Maria of Austria, and their marriage was childless, although he fathered illegitimate issue.

== Sources ==
- Cazacu, Matei (2017). Reinert, Stephen W. (ed.). Dracula. Brill.
- Gabriel, Astrik Ladislas (1986). The University of Paris and Its Hungarian Students and Masters During the Reign of Louis XII and François I. University of Notre Dame Press.
- Previte-Orton, C.W. (1962). The Shorter Cambridge Medieval History. Vol. II. Cambridge at the University Press.
- Woodacre, Elena (2013). The Queens Regnant of Navarre: Succession, Politics, and Partnership, 1274-1512. Palgrave Macmillan.

Anne of Foix House of Foix-Candale Born: 1484 Died: 1506
Royal titles
Vacant Title last held by Beatrice of Naples	Queen consort of Bohemia and Hungary; 1502–1506	Vacant Title next held by Mary of Austria
