= Catherine of Foix =

Catherine of Foix may refer to:

- Catherine of Navarre, queen of Navarre, duchess of Gandía, duchess of Montblanc, duchess of Peñafiel, countess of Foix
- Infanta Catherine of Navarre countess of Candale and countess of Benauges
