= Françoise de Rohan =

French duchess and courtier

Françoise de Rohan (1535 – 1 December 1591) was a French duchess and courtier. She served as lady-in-waiting to queen Catherine de' Medici.

== Life ==
Françoise was the daughter of René I de Rohan and Isabel d'Albret of Navarre. She was the granddaughter of Jean d'Albret, King of Navarre, and cousin of Jeanne d'Albret, who was mother of Henri of Navarre, also known as Henri IV.

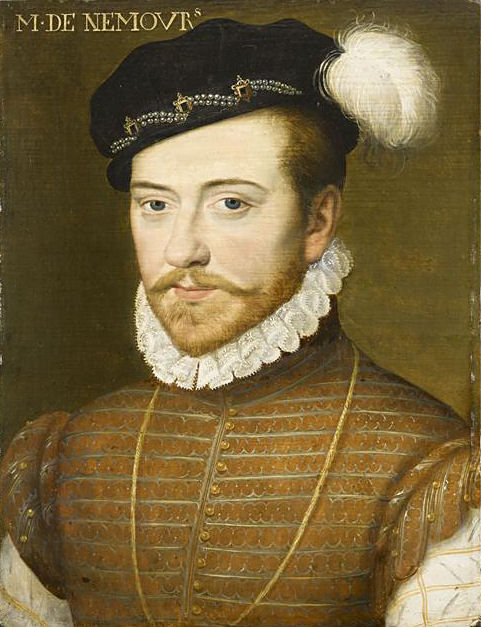
Her husband or lover, Jacques of Savoy, Duke of Nemours

Through her father, Françoise was descended from 11th-15th century Breton dukes, while on her mother's side she was a niece of Henry d'Albret, King of Navarre, who had married Marguerite d'Angoulême. Her aunt, Queen Marguerite, had Françoise educated with her own daughter, Jeanne, the future mother of Henry IV. Then, in 1549, Queen Marguerite died, and Françoise was sent to the French court. She became a lady-in-waiting of Catherine de' Medici. Françoise claimed to be the spouse of Jacques, Duke of Nemours by a secret wedding (1556), with whom she had a son, but Nemours denied this and married Anna d'Este in 1566.

Françoise and her best friend Catherine de Parthenay, who was her sister-in-law by marriage to René II de Rohan, acted as the benefactors and protectors of the French mathematician François Viète between 1572 and 1591. He dedicated them his most famous work on new algebra, In artem analyticem isagoge (fr).

== In culture ==
Also known as the duchess of Ludonois and Lady de la Garnache, her life has been suggested as informing the heroine found in the French novel La Princesse de Clèves by Marie-Madeleine Pioche de La Vergne.

La princesse de Clèves was the first French historical novel and among the first novels in French literature.

== Sources ==
- Vester, Matthew Allen (2012). Renaissance dynasticism and apanage politics : Jacques de Savoie-Nemours, 1531-1585. Truman State University Press.
- Margaret of France, duchess of Savoy, 1523-74: a biography By Winifred Stephens Whale
