= Madeleine of France =

Madeleine of France may refer to:

- Magdalena of France (1443–1495), daughter of Charles VII of France, mother of two monarchs of Navarre
- Madeleine of France (1520–1537), daughter of Francis I of France, Queen of Scots
