= Jacques de Foix, Count of Montfort =

Jacques de Foix (1463–1508) was a Count of Montfort-l'Amaury and "Captal Buch," and the so-called “Infante of Navarre”.

map showing Foix and Navarra

Born in early 1463, he was the ninth child of Gaston IV, Count of Foix and Bigorre, Viscount of Béarn, and his wife Eleanor (or Leonora) of Aragon, Queen of Navarre.

He was Governor of Béarn and Lieutenant-General of Lower Navarre for the king.

Married in 1485 and divorced in 1494 to Ana de Peralta, daughter of Pedro de Peralta, 1st Count de Santisteban y Lerín and his second wife Isabelle de Grailly, but divorced her in 1494.

He married a second time in 1495 to Catherine de Beaumont, daughter of Louis de Beaumont, 2nd Count de Lerín and his wife Leonor de Aragón. Jacques and his second wife had one child, Jean de Foix, abbot of Saint-Volusien-de-Foix.

Jacques also had two illegitimate children by unknown mistresses: Frederic de Foix (d. 1537), Lord d'Almenèches, and Jacques de Foix (d. 7 Apr 1535), Bishop of Oloron and Lescar.

Jacques de Foix, Infante of Navarre died in 1508.
