= Cardinal of Foix =

Cardinal of Foix (Fr.: Cardinal de Foix) may refer to:

- Pierre de Foix, le vieux (1386–1464), Archbishop of Arles, cardinal
- Pierre de Foix, le jeune (1449–1490), Bishop of Vannes, cardinal
