= Pierre de Foix =

Peter of Foix (French: Pierre de Foix) may refer to:

- Peter, Count of Foix (died 1071)
- Pierre de Foix-Lautrec (died 1454), viscount
- Pierre de Foix, le vieux (1386–1464), archbishop of Arles and cardinal
- Pierre de Foix, le jeune (1449–1490), bishop of Vannes and cardinal
