= Isabella of Navarre, Viscountess of Rohan =

Isabella of Navarre
- Viscountess of Rohan
- Born: 1512
- Died: aft. 1560
- Spouse: René I, Viscount of Rohan
- Issue: Françoise de Rohan; Louis de Rohan; Henri I, Viscount of Rohan, Jean de Rohan; René II, Viscount of Rohan
- House: Albret
- Father: John of Albret
- Mother: Catherine of Navarre

Isabel d'Albret of Navarre (1512–aft. 1560) was a princess of Navarre. She was the daughter of John III of Navarre (died 1516) and queen Catherine I of Navarre. The same year she was born, the greater part of Navarre was conquered by Aragon, and she was raised in France.

In 1528, there were unsuccessful suggestions for a marriage between her and the Hungarian king John Zápolya, an ally of the king of France. In 16 August 1532, Isabel married René I de Rohan, Viscount of Rohan (d. 1552).

Isabel became the godmother of her grand nephew Henry III of Navarre, whom she carried to his baptism in 1554. Isabel came to feel sympathy for Calvinism early on, but did not convert during the lifetime of her spouse, who remained a Catholic. In 1556, she met admiral de Coligny, and was present in Béarn in 1557 when queen Joan III of Navarre introduced the Reformation in Navarre. She converted to Protestantism in 1558, and her Castle of Blain became a center of Protestantism in the area. It was at her Castle of Blain that the first Breton church was organized. In Blain, she received the Protestant reformer d'Andelot, who had a mission in Nantes and held the first Protestant sermon there with the reformers Fleurer and Loiseleur de Villiers. In 1560, she was granted personal religious freedom for herself and her household on her own domains by the king of France.

== Issue ==
Isabel and Rene had:

- Françoise de Rohan
- Louis de Rohan, seigneur de Gié
- Henri I, Viscount of Rohan, 19th Viscount of Rohan, married Françoise of Tournemine
- Jean de Rohan, married Diane of Barbançon
- René II, de Rohan, 20th Viscount of Rohan, married Catherine of Parthenay

== Sources ==
- Walsby, Malcolm (2007). The Counts of Laval: Culture, Patronage and Religion in Fifteenth- and Sixteenth-Century France. Ashgate.
- Woodacre, Elena (2013). The Queens Regnant of Navarre: Succession, Politics, and Partnership, 1274-1512. Palgrave Macmillan.
