= Blanche II of Navarre =

Titular queen of Navarre from 1461 to 1464

Blanche II
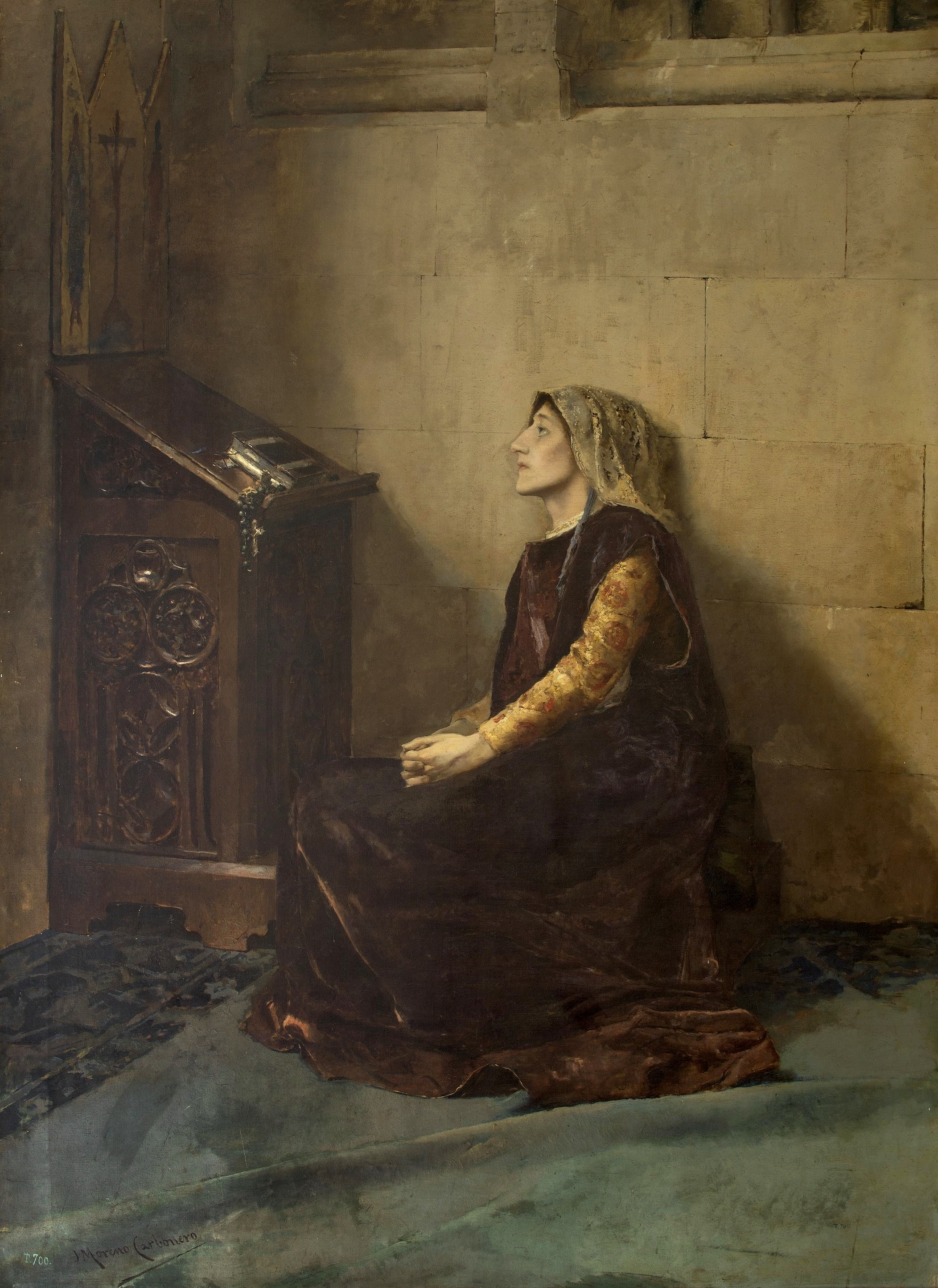
- Doña Blanca de Navarra by José Moreno Carbonero, 1880, University of Santiago de Compostela.

Queen of Navarre de jure only
- Reign: 23 September 1461 – 2 December 1464
- Predecessor: Charles IV
- Successor: Eleanor (from 1479)
- Contender: John II
- Born: 9 June 1424; Olite, Navarre
- Died: 2 December 1464 (aged 40); Orthez, France
- Burial: Lescar
- Spouse: Henry IV of Castile (m. 1440; ann. 1453)
- House: Trastámara
- Father: John II of Aragon
- Mother: Blanche I of Navarre

Blanche II (Note: Spanish: Blanca, Basque: Zuria) (9 June 1424 – 2 December 1464) was a Navarrese princess and claimant to the throne of Navarre. She was the daughter of John II of Navarre and Blanche I of Navarre, and was recognized early in life as an heir in the line of succession. Her marriage to Henry IV of Castile, arranged to secure peace between Navarre and Castile, ended in annulment. After returning to Navarre, she supported her brother Charles, Prince of Viana in his dispute with their father over the crown. Following her brother's death, she became a rival claimant but was detained and later transferred to France, where she died under uncertain circumstances.

== Biography ==
Blanche was born on 9 June 1424 in Olite, Navarre. She was the second child and eldest daughter of John II of Aragon, then Duke of Montblanc, and his wife, Blanche of Navarre. In 1427, Blanche, her brother Charles, and her sister Eleanor were proclaimed the rightful heirs of the kingdom of Navarre.

At eleven, Blanche was betrothed to Prince Henry of Castile, the future Henry IV, as part of the Peace of Toledo in 1436, a treaty designed to resolve disputes within the Trastámara dynasty. The agreement required the Aragonese princes to renounce lands and claims for financial compensation, while Blanche's marriage to Henry aimed to secure peace between Navarre and Castile. A papal dispensation was required due to the close kinship of Blanche and Henry.

The betrothal was formalized in 1437, and the marriage took place in 1440 in Valladolid. Blanche's dowry included properties that had been confiscated from her father. These lands were to be administered by him until the marriage was consummated. After the wedding, Blanche and Henry maintained a distant relationship and the marriage never succeeded.

In 1453, Henry sought to annul the marriage, claiming that it had not been consummated. The process was public and difficult for Blanche. Evidence was presented to support Henry's claim that he was capable of sexual relations, including testimony from women in Segovia. An official examination confirmed the virginity of Blanche. The court, presided over by the bishop of Segovia, Luis Vasquez de Acuna, accepted the argument that the marriage had not been consummated and granted the annulment.

The marriage failed, in part, because of strained relations between Henry and his father-in-law, John II of Navarre. At the same time, internal conflicts in Navarre intensified after Blanche I's death in 1441, as John II and his son Charles disputed the succession despite the queen's call for cooperation.

Navarre was divided between the Beaumonts, who supported Charles, and the Agramontes, who supported John II, leading to prolonged instability. After her annulment in 1453, Blanche returned to Navarre and supported Charles's claim, which their father opposed. By then, John II had remarried Juana Enríquez and had another son, Ferdinand, who would become Ferdinand II of Aragon. In 1455, he disinherited both Charles and Blanche, naming their younger sister Eleanor as his successor.

Blanche and Charles were later pardoned, but their position remained weak. Blanche was kept under her father's control in Pamplona. Charles sought alliances, negotiating with Louis XI of France, and considered marrying Blanche to a French royal relative, possibly Philibert of Genoa, but these plans failed. Charles died in 1461 without legitimate heirs, leaving Blanche as the next heir by primogeniture.

After Charles's death, the Beaumont faction supported Blanche's claim to the throne, but her position remained uncertain as her father and sister opposed her. Eleanor served as John II's deputy in Navarre. The political situation was complicated further when John II became king of Aragon in 1458, dividing his attention between his kingdoms.

In 1462, Gaston IV of Foix, Eleanor's husband, reached an agreement with Louis XI that recognized John II and Eleanor as rulers and heirs, excluding Blanche. As part of this settlement, Blanche was handed over to Gaston IV and taken to his territories in southern France, hindering her supporters and preventing her from leading the movement supporting her candidacy.

A proposed marriage to Charles, Duke of Berry served as a pretext for her transfer. Blanche refused the marriage and agreed not to leave Foix or return to Navarre. She protested her treatment, asserting she had been forced into exile but her rights remained intact. She stated that any transfer of her rights should favor either the King of Castile or the Count of Armagnac. Blanche also appealed to her former husband, Henry IV of Castile. She stated that if she died childless or did not regain her freedom, her rights should pass to him. She also requested his protection for her supporters, including the Beaumont faction.

Despite her protests, Blanche's situation did not improve. Agreements during the Catalan Civil War included provisions for her return to Navarre and a review of her rights. The Concord of Tarragona in 1464 proposed that the Cortes consider her status and succession, but these measures were never implemented.

Blanche died on 2 December 1464, in Orthez, France. Reports described her death as sudden and unusual, with some accounts suggesting possible poisoning, allegedly ordered by Eleanor and Gaston IV. Upon her death, her rights to Navarre were inherited by her sister, Eleanor of Aragon, Countess of Foix, who, as an ally of her father, did not press her own claims until after his death in 1479.

== Sources ==
- Bueno Domínguez, María Luisa (2008). "Blanca II of Navarre". Real Academia de la Historia (in Spanish).
- MacKay, Angus (2003). "Blanca, Queen of Navarre, Wife of Enrique IV". In Gerli, E. Michael (ed.). Medieval Iberia : an encyclopedia. New York: Routledge. ISBN 0-415-93918-6. OCLC 50404104.
- Orpustan, Jean-Baptiste (n.d.). La Basse-Navarre dans la guerre de Navarre (1512–1530), récit historique, d'après Navarra, 1512-1530… de Pedro Esarte Muniain (Pamiela, Pamplona-Iruña 2001) [Lower Navarre in the War of Navarre (1512–1530), historical narrative, according to the book 'Navarra, 1512–1530: ...' by Pedro Esarte Muniain (Pamiela, Pamplona-Iruña 2001).] (PDF) (in French). Osses: Jean-Baptiste Orpustan. pp. 1–25 – via Tipirena.net.
- Phillips, William D. (1978). Enrique IV and the crisis of fifteenth-century Castile, 1425–1480. Cambridge, Mass: Mediaeval Academy of America. ISBN 978-0-910956-63-5.

Blanche II of Navarre House of Trastámara Born: 9 June 1424 Died: 2 December 1464
Titles in pretence
Preceded by Charles (IV)	— TITULAR — Queen of Navarre; 23 September 1461 – 2 December 1464; Reason for succession failure: Crown withheld by John II	Succeeded by Eleanor as inactive claimant
