= Louis de Beaumont, 2nd Count de Lerín =

Louis of Beaumont (c. 1430 – 1508) was a noble in the Kingdom of Navarre. He was the 2nd Count of Lerín in southern Navarre, Marquis of Huesca, and Constable (condestable) of Navarre.

== Career ==
Louis prospered initially due to much of the civil strife following the War of the Bands in the Basque territories of Castile and Navarre, present-day northern Spain. He was at times a strong supporter of Ferdinand II of Aragon in the dynastic struggles between Ferdinand II of Aragon against his son in law, Philip I of Castile. He became the head of the Beaumont faction in Navarre. He reportedly assassinated Felipe de Navarra, Marshal of the Kingdom, in 1479.

In a treaty between the Navarrese monarchs and King Ferdinand II, Ferdinand promised to stop warring on Navarre or Béarn, Louis would hand over some strategic fortresses in exchange for new lands in Granada. However, when Louis refused to surrender the castle of Viana in 1506, the crown decided to crush the rebellious count for ever, restoring royal authority and patrimony. In December 1506 an army of 10,000 men led by Cesare Borgia and John III of Navarre besieged Louis in the Castle at Viana in Navarre, as he was an ally of Ferdinand II of Aragon. During the ensuing siege, the castle was held by Louis de Beaumont and Cesare was killed during the battle.

In 1507 Louis was charged with treason, dispossessed and sentenced to death, but he escaped to Aragon where he died in 1508 at Aranda.

== Private life ==
He was the eldest son of eight children born to Louis I de Beaumont and his wife Juana de Navarre. His brother Charles was Archdeacon at Pamplona, his brother Guillen was an advisor to Carlos of Viana, and His Brother Juan was Chancellor of Navarre and prior of the Order of Malta.

On the 22 Jan 1468 at Tarragona Louis married Eleonore d'Aragon the illegitimate daughter of king Juan II d'Aragon, and they had four children:
■ Louis III de Beaumont
■ Ferdinand de Beaumont
■ Anne de Beaumont married to Juan de Mendoza, brother of Diego Hurtado de Mendoza, 2nd Marquis of Cañete
■ Doña Catalina de Beaumont

He also had three illegitimate sons:
■ Pierre de Beaumont
■ Jean de Beaumont
■ Luis de Viana Beaumont
