= Catherine of Foix, Countess of Candale =

French noblewoman

Catherine de Foix
- Born: c. 1455
- Died: before 1494
- Spouse: Gaston II de Foix, Count of Candale and Benauges
- Issue: Anne, Queen of Bohemia and Hungary
- House: House of Foix
- Father: Gaston IV, Count of Foix
- Mother: Eleanor of Navarre

Catherine de Foix (c. 1455 – died before 1494) was a French noblewoman.

She was the daughter of Gaston IV, Count of Foix, and Eleanor of Navarre, and was the granddaughter of John II of Aragon and Blanche I of Navarre.

== Marriage and issue ==
Catherine married Gaston de Foix, Count of Candale. They had:

- Gaston de Foix, 3rd Count of Candale.
- Jean de Foix, Archbishop of Bordeaux.
- Pierre de Foix, died without issue.
- Anne de Foix (1484-1506), married King Vladislaus II of Bohemia and Hungary.

== Sources ==
- Woodacre, Elena (2013). The Queens Regnant of Navarre: Succession, Politics, and Partnership, 1274-1512. Palgrave Macmillan.
