= René I, Viscount of Rohan =

French viscount

House of Rohan

René I de Rohan, (1516–1552) 18th Viscount of Rohan, Viscount and Prince de Léon, and Marquis de Blain. He married Isabella of Navarre daughter of jure uxoris King John III of Navarre and Catherine of Navarre, Queen of Navarre.

== Life ==
René was the son of Pierre II de Rohan and Anne de Rohan, who upon her death transmitted the titles of her brother, Jacques de Rohan, who died without heirs. René's guardian was Queen Margaret of Navarre, sister of Francis I of France. He married Isabella of Navarre daughter of jure uxoris King John III of Navarre and Catherine of Navarre, Queen of Navarre. The marriage had been arranged by Margaret.

René died in 1552 fighting on the Holy Roman Empire frontier during the Siege of Metz.

== Children ==
René and Isabella had:

- Françoise de Rohan, married to Jacques de Savoie, duc de Nemours
- Louis de Rohan, seigneur de Gié
- Henri I, Viscount of Rohan, 19th Viscount of Rohan, married Françoise of Tournemine
- Jean de Rohan, married Diane of Barbançon
- René II, de Rohan, 20th Viscount of Rohan, married Catherine of Parthenay

== Bibliography ==
- Clarke, Jack A. (1966). Huguenot Warrior: The Life and Times of Henri de Rohan, 1579–1638. Springer.
- Vester, Matthew Allen (2012). Renaissance dynasticism and apanage politics : Jacques de Savoie-Nemours, 1531-1585. Truman State University Press.
- Woodacre, Elena (2013). The Queens Regnant of Navarre. Palgrave Macmillan.
- Walsby, Malcolm (2007). The Counts of Laval: Culture, Patronage and Religion in Fifteenth- and Sixteenth-Century France. Ashgate.
