= Roger II of Foix =

Roger II (died 1124) was the count of Foix from around 1071 until his death.

Roger succeeded his father, Peter, as count when he was still a minor. He first appears as count in a witness list to an accord between the counts of Toulouse and Barcelona regarding the Lauraguais in 1071. He may have accepted the suzerainty of the count of Barcelona. In a will dated 1076, Count Raymond Berengar II of Barcelona speaks of his rights in the county of Foix.

A single gold coin (a mancus) found in Gallipoli and bearing the inscriptions rogerivs and amte has been attributed to Roger II and the mint at Agramunt in the county of Urgell. It has been taken as evidence that Roger held the regency of Urgell during the minority of Ermengol V, which lasted from 1092 until 1094 or 1095. Its design, a bust on the obverse and a cross on the reverse, is so similar to that of the contemporary Jaca mancuses minted by King Sancho Ramírez of Aragon that they may be the work of the same engraver.

In the spring of 1095, six months before the Council of Clermont, Roger was preparing to go on a pilgrimage to Jerusalem. He did not, contrary what is sometimes stated, go on the First Crusade. He returned to Foix in 1096. The coing found in Gallipoli is consistent with it having travelled with Roger during his pilgrimage.

Roger brought back relics of Saint Antoninus from Apamea and constructed a monastery for them. The village of Pamiers (named after Apamea) arose around the abbey. Already by 1111 the area around the monastery was known as Appamia. Roger's efforts to retain control of the monastery led to his excommunication by the pope.

Roger died in 1124 and was succeeded by his son, Roger III.

== Sources ==
- Abbott, Paul D. (1981). Provinces, Pays and Seigneuries of France. Pirie Printers. ISBN 0959377301.
- Beckmann, Gustav A. (2023). Onomastics of the "Chanson de Roland", Or: Why Gaston Paris and Joseph Bédier Were Both Right. Translated by Linda Archibald. De Gruyter.
- Blanks, David (2006). "The Wrong Sort of Mentor: Heterodoxy and Anti-clericalism in Languedoc". In David Blanks; Michael Frassetto; Amy Livingstone (eds.). Medieval Monks and Their World: Ideas and Realities. Brill. pp. 163–182.
- Crusafont i Sabater, Miquel (2001). "Mancús d'Urgell o mancús de Foix?". Acta Numismàtica. 31: 85–95.
- Crusafont, Miquel; Balaguer, Anna M.; Grierson, Philip (2013). Medieval European Coinage, 6: The Iberian Peninsula. Cambridge University Press.
- Frankopan, Peter (2016). The First Crusade: The Call from the East. Harvard University Press.
- Garrau, Morgan (2023). La seigneurie des comtes de Foix en Carcassès (1096–1311) (PDF) (Master's thesis). Université Toulouse Jean Jaurès.
- Riley-Smith, Jonathan (1997). The First Crusaders, 1095–1131. Cambridge University Press.
- Riley-Smith, Jonathan (2003). The First Crusade and the Idea of Crusading. Bloomsbury.
