= Marie of Orléans, Viscountess of Narbonne =

Marie of Orléans
- Countess of Étampes; Viscountess of Narbonne
- Born: 19 December/September 1457
- Died: 1493
- Spouse: John of Foix
- Issue: Germaine, Queen of Aragon; Gaston, Duke of Nemours
- House: Valois-Orléans
- Father: Charles I, Duke of Orléans
- Mother: Marie of Cleves

Marie of Orléans (19 December/September 1457 – 1493) was the elder sister of King Louis XII of France. Due to her marriage to John of Foix, she was Countess of Étampes and Viscountess of Narbonne.

Marie was the eldest daughter of Charles I, Duke of Orléans, and his third wife Marie of Cleves. After a previous betrothal to Peter II, Duke of Bourbon, she married John of Foix on 8 September 1483.

== Issue ==
She had two children by John of Foix:

- Germaine of Foix (1488–1538)
  - married Ferdinand II of Aragon, and whose relationship to the Navarrese throne was used as an excuse by Ferdinand to claim the throne of Navarre (see Spanish conquest of Iberian Navarre)
- Gaston of Foix (1489–1512)
  - served as a general for his uncle Louis XII, killed at the battle of Ravenna in 1512.

== Ancestors ==
Ancestors of Marie of Orléans, Viscountess of Narbonne

8. Charles V of France
4. Louis I, Duke of Orléans
9. Joanna of Bourbon
2. Charles I, Duke of Orléans
10. Gian Galeazzo Visconti
5. Valentina Visconti
11. Isabella of Valois (≠ 9)
1. Marie of Orléans
12. Adolph III, Count of the Mark
6. Adolph I, Duke of Cleves
13. Margaret of Jülich
3. Marie of Cleves
14. John II, Duke of Burgundy
7. Mary of Burgundy
15. Margaret of Bavaria
