= Catherine of Navarre =

Queen of Navarre from 1483 to 1517

Catherine
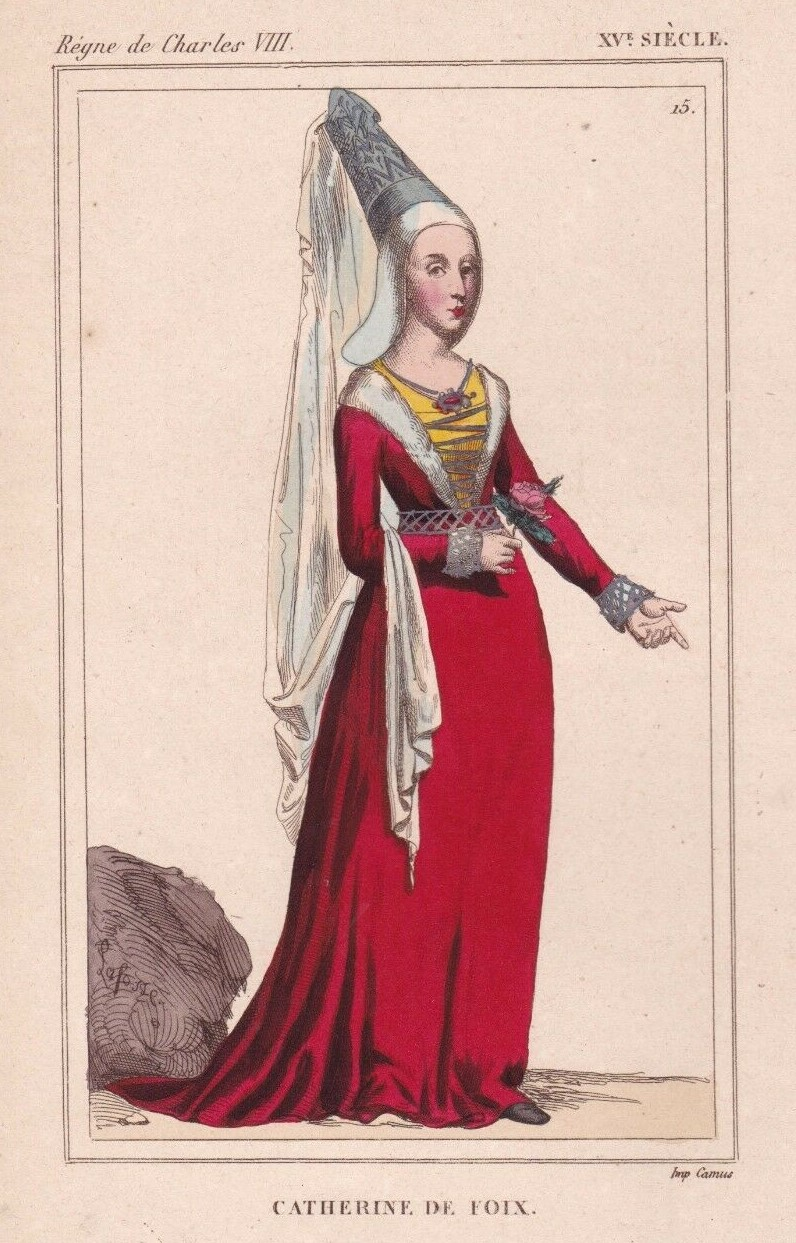

Queen of Navarre
- Reign: 7 January 1483 – 12 February 1517
- Coronation: 1494
- Predecessor: Francis Phoebus
- Successor: Henry II
- Co-ruler: John III (1484–1516)
- Contender: Ferdinand II of Aragon (1512–1516)

Co-Princess of Andorra
- Reign: 1483–1517
- Predecessor: Francis Phoebus
- Successor: Henry II
- Co-rulers: See: Pedro Folc de Cardona (until 1515); Joan Despés (from 1515)
- Born: 1468
- Died: 12 February 1517 (aged 48–49)
- Spouse: John of Albret (m. 1484; died 1516)
- Issue among others...: Infanta Anne; Henry II, King of Navarre; Infante Charles; Isabella, Viscountess of Rohan
- House: Foix
- Father: Gaston, Prince of Viana
- Mother: Magdeleine of France
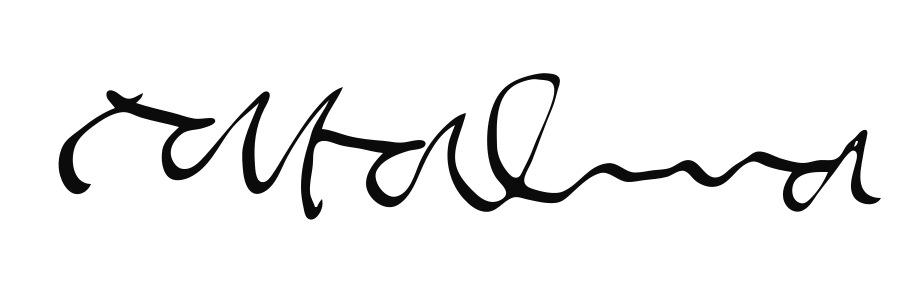
- Signature

Catherine (Spanish: Catalina, Basque: Katalina, Occitan: Catarina; 1468 – 12 February 1517) was Queen of Navarre from 1483 until 1517. She was also Duchess of Gandia, Montblanc, and Peñafiel, Countess of Foix, Bigorre, and Ribagorza, and Viscountess of Béarn.

== Biography ==
Catherine was the younger daughter of Gaston of Foix, Prince of Viana, and Magdalena of Valois, the sister of Louis XI of France. She was born and raised during the reign of her paternal great-grandfather, King John II, who was succeeded by her grandmother Eleanor in 1479. Their father having already died, the crown of Navarre devolved upon Catherine's brother Francis Phoebus upon their grandmother's death the same year.

=== Reign ===
In 1483 the death of Francis made Catherine queen under the regency of their mother. Her uncle John of Foix, appealing to the Salic Law alien to the Kingdom of Navarre, claimed the throne and ignited a civil war (1483–1492) that reignited the old conflict of the Beaumont-Agramont parties. In 1484, hard pressed by ambitions over the throne of Navarre, Magdalena of Valois decided to marry 15-year-old Catherine to John of Albret, hailing from a noble family in western Gascony. This marriage was favored by many of Catherine's Iberian subjects and would have given Catherine much needed support in her fight against her uncle's claim.

The wedding took place at the Notre Dâme Cathedral of Lescar in 1486, but the coronation of the young couple in Pamplona was deferred until 1494, after a fleeting peace treaty with Louis of Beaumont, Count of Lerín, and Catherine's granduncle, King Ferdinand II of Aragon, was signed. However, the marriage did not garner the sympathy of the Navarrese Beaumont party, always preferring Isabella I of Castile's and Ferdinand II of Aragon's offer to marry Catherine to their son John, Prince of Asturias, and even the Agramont party split. Catherine's mother Magdalena died in 1495.

The marriage appears not to have been consummated until 1491. It is possible that the consummation, being a political event, was purposely postponed in order to prevent Catherine and her husband being declared of legal majority, which would allow Catherine's mother Magdalena to continue her regency. In any event, Catherine's mother Magdalena continued her regency even after the coronation of Catherine and her spouse in 1494, and continued to sign charters and other documents and be mentioned first.

In 1494, Magdalena's regency was finally ended when Magdalena was taken hostage by Aragon, and Catherine personally took control over the government with her husband at the age of twenty-six. Catherine was described as “very mature, she had great courage, prudence and the magnanimity and always worked with all fidelity at the royal pledges to help the King, her husband, in the government as it ran to both their account.”

In 1504, she made her will, confirming her son Henry's right to succeed her and expressing her wish to be buried at the Cathedral of Pamplona—ultimately both she and John were interred in Lescar. The political alliance between the houses of Valois and Foix ahead of an impending Spanish invasion led to marriage negotiations between Catherine and Louis XII in 1512. It was suggested that Henry should marry a daughter of the French king.

=== 1512 Castilian-Aragonese invasion ===
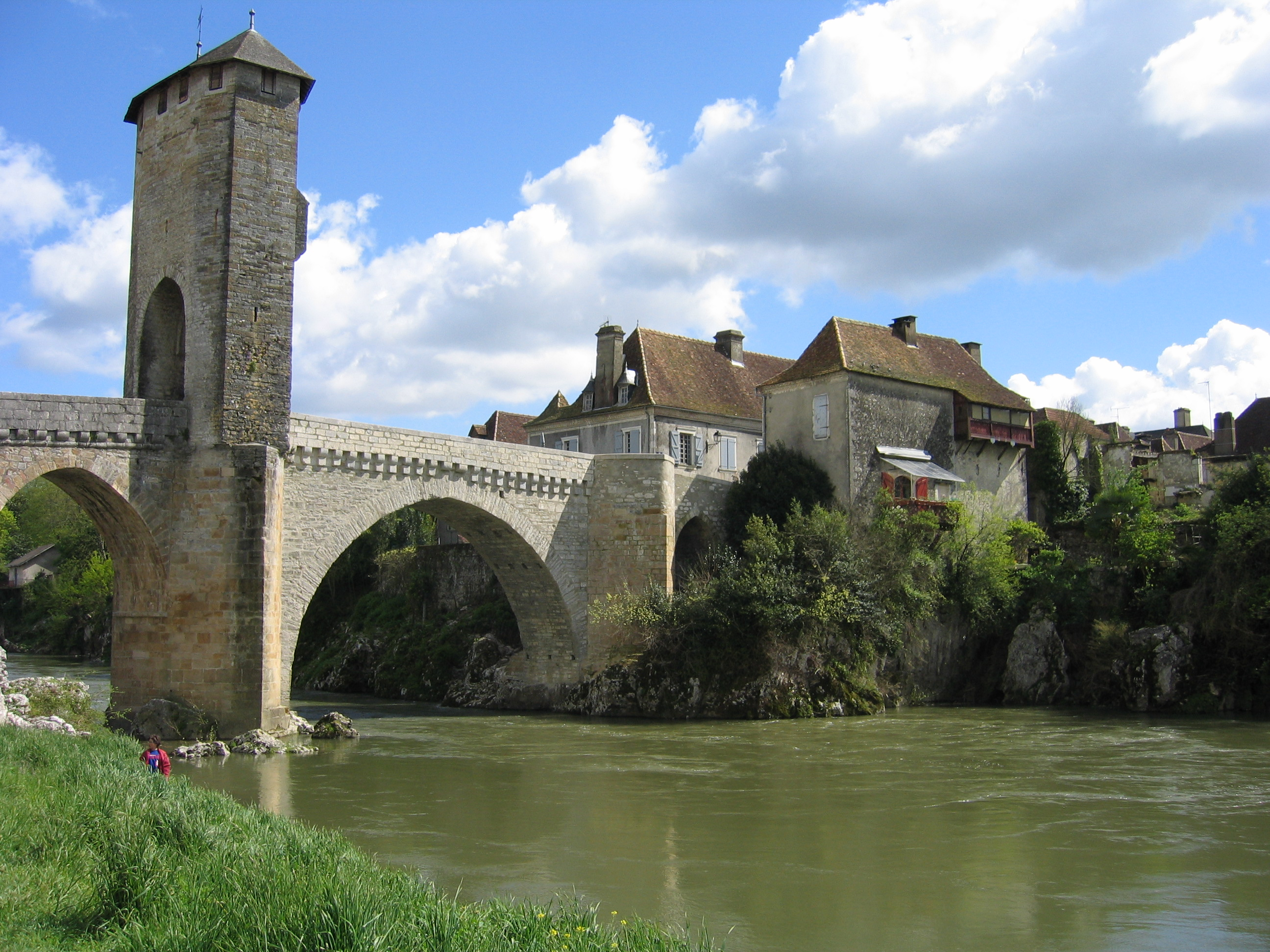
Orthez, a town where the Navarrese monarchs took shelter after 1512

Ferdinand, who had allied with the Pope against France, presented a set of claims to the legitimate royal family of Navarre. Catherine did not accept the demands, and Ferdinand sent Fadrique Álvarez de Toledo, 2nd Duke of Alba, who occupied Pamplona on 25 July 1512. The Castilians went on to conquer St-Jean-Pied-de-Port (Donibane Garazi in Basque) after setting fire to Roncevaux, and wrought havoc across the merindad of Ultrapuertos (Lower Navarre). The Spanish troops would retain the southern half of that region intermittently for the next years. Catherine and John III, overwhelmed by the Castilian push, fled to Bearn, constituent part of their kingdom. They set their base in Pau, Orthez and Tarbes, where they alternately resided most of the time until their deaths.

On 23 March 1513, the Cortes of Navarre reunited in Pamplona (Iruñea in Basque), greatly reduced to the pro-Spanish Beaumont party, and pledged allegiance to Ferdinand in exchange for his loyalty to the Navarrese laws. In 1515, Upper Navarre was annexed to the Crown of Castile as a different kingdom (aeque principalis), and it would be one constituent part of the Kingdom of the Spains, as Spain came to be known during the following period.

=== Later years ===
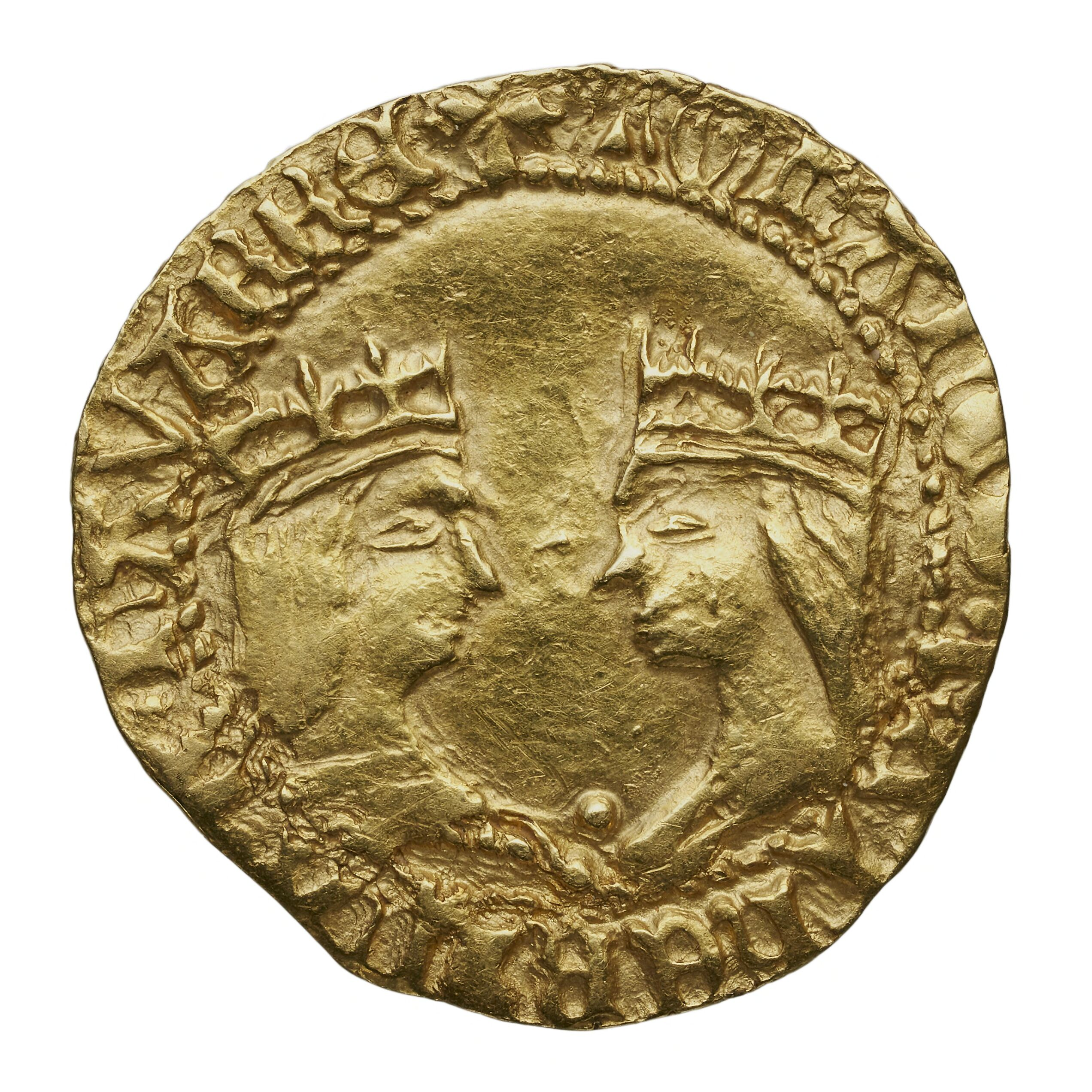
Queen Catherine's effigy with King John III stamped on a coin

In 1516, two columns led by King John III and Pedro, Marshal of Navarre, crossed the Pyrenees south and attempted to reconquer Navarre but they failed to progress into the heartland of the kingdom. Devastated by the defeats undergone, John retreated to Monein, and died on 17 June 1516. Queen Catherine did not outlive her husband much longer, and died in her domain of Mont-de-Marsan on 12 February 1517, just a few months later. By then, she had given birth to 13 children (other sources point to 14).

From 1512 to her death in 1517, Catherine was actual queen only in some areas of Basse-Navarre, or Lower Navarre, north of the Pyrenees, but her domains extended to the contiguous Principality of Bearn and other lands.

== Children ==
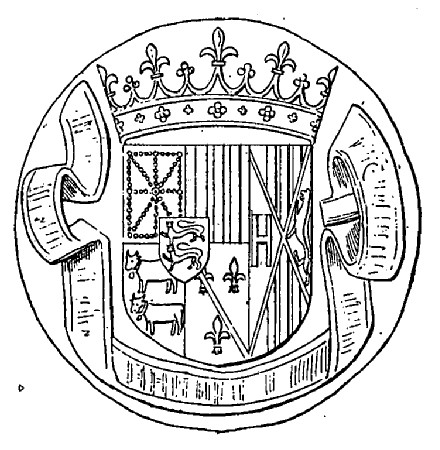
Seal of Catherine of Navarre

She and John III of Navarre were parents to thirteen children:

1. Anne of Navarre (19 May 1492 – 15 August 1532).
2. Magdalena of Navarre (29 March 1494 – May 1504).
3. Catherine of Navarre (1495 – November 1532). Abbess of the Trinity at Caen.
4. Joan of Navarre (15 June 1496 – last mentioned in November, 1496).
5. Quiteria of Navarre (1499 – September/October 1536). Abbess at Montivilliers.
6. A stillborn son in 1500.
7. Andrew Phoebus of Navarre (14 October 1501 – 17 April 1503).
8. Henry II of Navarre (18 April 1503 – 25 May 1555).
9. Buenaventura of Navarre (14 July 1505 – 1510/1511).
10. Martin of Navarre (c. 1506 – last mentioned in 1512).
11. Francis of Navarre (1508 – last mentioned in 1512).
12. Charles of Navarre (12 December 1510 – September 1528). Took part in the Siege of Naples during the War of the League of Cognac but was captured. Died while still held as a prisoner of war.
13. Isabella of Navarre (1513/1514 – last mentioned in 1555). Married Rene I, Viscount of Rohan.

Catherine of Navarre House of Foix Born: 1468 Died: 1517
Regnal titles
Preceded by Francis I	Queen of Navarre; 1483–1517 with John III (1484-1516) disputed by Ferdinand I (1512-1516)	Succeeded by Henry II
Preceded by Francis I	Countess of Foix; 1483–1517 with John III (1484-1516)	Succeeded by Henry II
