= Count of Foix =

French feudal title during the Middle Ages

Coat of arms of the Counts of Foix

The Count of Foix ruled the County of Foix, in what is now Southern France, during the Middle Ages. The House of Foix eventually extended its power across the Pyrenees mountain range, joining the House of Bearn and moving their court to Pau in Béarn. Count Francis Phoebus became King of Navarre in 1479. The last count was King Henry III of Navarre, after whose accession to the French throne the county entered the French royal domain.

To this day, the president of France is considered an unofficial successor of the count (as the current ruler of the French state) as co-prince of Andorra.

== Gallery of Arms ==

Arms of the House of Foix-Béarn

Arms of the House of Foix-Grailly

Arms of the House of Foix-Grailly-Navarre

Arms of the House of Albret

Arms of the House of Bourbon

== List of counts of Foix ==
=== House of Foix ===
- 1010-1034 : Bernard Roger, count of Couserans, count of Bigorre, lord of Comminges and lord of Foix (second son of Roger I of Carcassonne)

Name	Portrait	Birth	Marriage(s)	Death
Roger I 1034–1064		? second son of Bernard-Roger and Garsenda, Countess of Bigorre	never married	c. 1064
Pierre-Bernard; 1064–1071		? third son of Bernard-Roger and Garsenda, Countess of Bigorre	Ledgarde two son	c. 1071
Roger II; 1071–1124		? eldest son of Pierre-Bernard and Ledgarde	(1) Sicarda; 1073 no issues (2) Stephanie of Besalú four children	c. 1124
Roger III; 1124–1148		? eldest son of Roger II and Stephanie of Besalú	(1) ? one daughter (2) Jimena of Barcelona bef. 8 July 1130 two children	c. 1148
Roger-Bernard I 1148–1188		c. 1130 only son of Roger III and Jimena of Barcelona	Cecilia of Béziers; 11 July 1151 five children	November 1188 aged 57–58
Raymond-Roger; 1188–1223		c. 1152 second son of Roger-Bernard I and Cecilia of Béziers	Philippa of Montcada; 1189 two children	27 March 1223; Château de Mirepoix aged 70–71
Roger-Bernard II; 1223–1241		c. 1195 only son of Raymond-Roger and Philippa of Montcada	(1) Ermesinda, Viscountess of Castelbón; 10 January 1203 two children (2) Ermengarde of Narbonne; 23 January 1232 one daughter	26 May 1241 aged 45–46
Roger IV; 1241–1265		? only son of Roger-Bernard II and Ermesinda, Viscountess of Castelbón	Brunissenda of Cardona; 17 February 1231 five children	24 February 1265
Roger-Bernard III; 1265–1302		c. 1243 eldest son of Roger IV and Brunissenda of Cardona	Margaret, Viscountess of Béarn; 14 October 1252; Tarn-et-Garonne five children	3 March 1302 aged 59

=== House of Foix-Béarn ===
Name	Portrait	Birth	Marriage(s)	Death
Gaston I 1302–1315		c. 1287 only son of Roger-Bernard III and Margaret, Viscountess of Béarn	Joan of Artois; October 1301; Senlis six children	13 December 1315; Maubuisson Abbey, Pontoise aged 27–28
Gaston II; 1315–1343		c. 1308 eldest son of Gaston I and Joan of Artois	Eleanor of Comminges; 1327 one son	26 September 1343; Seville aged 34–35
Gaston III Phoebus; 1343–1391		30 April 1331; Orthez only son of Gaston II and Eleanor of Comminges	Agnes of Navarre; Paris; 4 August 1349 one son	1 August 1391; L'Hôpital-d'Orion aged 60
Matthew; 1391–1398		c. 1363 second son of Roger Bernard IV, Viscount of Castelbon and Gerauda of Navailles	Joanna of Aragon; 4 June 1392; Barcelona no issues	August 1398 aged 34–35
Isabella; 1398–1428 with Archambaud (1398–1412) with John I (1412–1428)		bef. 2 November 1361 only daughter of Roger Bernard IV, Viscount of Castelbon and Gerauda of Navailles	1381 five children	c. 1428 aged 46+
Archambaud de Grailly; 1398–1412 with Isabella		c. 1329-1330 second son of Pierre II de Grailly and Erembourga de Périgord	1381 five children	c. 1412 aged 81–83

=== House of Foix-Grailly ===
Name	Portrait	Birth	Marriage(s)	Death
John I 1412–1436 with Isabella (1412–1428)		c. 1382 eldest son of Archambaud and Isabella	(1) Joan of Navarre; 12 November 1402; Royal Palace of Olite no issues (2) Jeanne d'Albret; 23 May 1422 two sons (3) Joanna of Urgell; May 1436 no issues	4 May 1436; Mazères, Ariège aged 53–54
Gaston IV; 1436–1472		27 November 1422 eldest son of John I and Jeanne d'Albret	Eleanor of Navarre; 30 July 1436 ten children	25/28 July 1472; Roncevalles aged 49
Francis Phoebus; 1472–1483		November/December 1466 only son of Gaston of Foix, Prince of Viana and Magdalena of Valois	never married	30 January 1483; Pamplona aged 16
Catherine; 1483–1517 with John II (1484–1516)		1468 only daughter of Gaston of Foix, Prince of Viana and Magdalena of Valois	14 July 1484; Palacio Real de Olite thirteen children	12 February 1517; Mont-de-Marsan aged 48–49
John II; 1484–1516 with Catherine		1469 second son of Alain I of Albret and Françoise, Countess of Périgord	14 July 1484; Palacio Real de Olite thirteen children	14 June 1516; Château de Pau aged 46–47

=== House of Albret ===
Name	Portrait	Birth	Marriage(s)	Death
Henry I 1517–1555		18 April 1503; Sangüesa third son of John II and Catherine	Margaret of Angoulême; 24 January 1527; Saint-Germain-en-Laye two children	25 May 1555; Hagetmau aged 52
Jeanne; 1555–1572 with Antoine (1555–1562)		7 January 1528; Saint-Germain-en-Laye only daughter of Henry I and Margaret of Angoulême	(1) William, Duke of Jülich-Cleves-Berg; 14 June 1541; Château de Châtellerault no issues (2) Antoine of Navarre; 20 October 1548; Moulins en Bourbonnais, Allier five children	9 June 1572; Paris aged 44
Antoine; 1555-1562 with Jeanne		22 April 1518; La Fère, Picardy second son of Charles, Duke of Vendôme and Françoise of Alençon	Jeanne; 20 October 1548; Moulins en Bourbonnais, Allier five children	17 November 1562; Les Andelys, Eure aged 44

=== House of Bourbon ===
Name	Portrait	Birth	Marriage(s)	Death
Henry II; 1572–1607		13 December 1553; Château de Pau second son of Antoine and Jeanne	(1) Margaret of Valois; 18 August 1572; Notre Dame Cathedral, Paris no issues (2) Marie de' Medici; 17 December 1600; Lyon six children	14 May 1610; Paris aged 56

In 1607 the county of Foix was reunited to the French crown.

== See also ==
- Foix
- Castle of Foix
- County of Foix
- Diana of Foix
- Navarre monarchs family tree
- List of Co-Princes of Andorra
- List of Navarrese monarchs from the House of Foix
