= Charles, Prince of Viana =

Claimed king of Navarre from 1441 to 1461

Charles IV

King of Navarre de jure only
- Reign: 1441–1461
- Predecessor: Blanche I and John II
- Successor: Blanche II
- Contender: John II
- Born: 29 May 1421; Peñafiel, Crown of Castile
- Died: 23 September 1461 (aged 40); Barcelona, Principality of Catalonia
- Spouse: Agnes of Cleves
- Issue: Anna, Countess of Medinaceli (illegitimate); Philip, Archbishop of Palermo (illegitimate); John, Bishop of Huesca (illegitimate)
- House: Trastámara
- Father: John II of Aragon
- Mother: Blanche I of Navarre

Charles, Prince of Viana (Basque: Karlos IV.a) (29 May 1421 – 23 September 1461), sometimes called Charles IV of Navarre, was the eldest son of King John II of Aragon and Queen Blanche I of Navarre. He pre-deceased his father.

== Background ==
His mother was the daughter and heiress of Charles III, King of Navarre. Both his grandfather Charles and his mother, who ruled over Navarre from 1425 to 1441, had bequeathed this kingdom to Charles, whose right had also been recognized by the Cortes; but when Blanche died in 1441 her husband John seized the kingdom to the exclusion of his son.

== Marriage ==
The Prince of Viana was married in Olite (Navarre) on 30 September 1439, taking as his wife Agnes of Cleves (1422–1446), the daughter of Adolph I, Duke of Cleves and Mary of Burgundy, and the niece of Philip III "the Good", Duke of Burgundy. Agnes died, childless, on 6 April 1448, eight years after her marriage to Charles, aged only about twenty-six. After her death, the prince took a mistress, Brianda de Vaca, and by her had an illegitimate son, born about 1449. He wished to remarry, and a possibility which was canvassed was a match with Isabella of Scotland (1426–1494), the widow of Francis I, Duke of Brittany, after he died on 18 July 1450, but this was opposed by Charles VII of France. A match was then agreed between Charles and the Infanta Catherine of Portugal (1436–1463), daughter of King Edward of Portugal, but the marriage was delayed and had not taken place when Charles died in 1461.

Charles left three illegitimate children by three different mistresses:

1. Anna, Countess of Medinaceli (1451-1477), married Luis de la Cerda y de la Vega, 5th Count of Medinaceli,
2. Philip, Archbishop of Palermo (1456–1488),
3. John, Bishop of Huesca (1459-1529).

== Clashes with his father ==
The ill feeling between father and son was increased when his father John took in 1447 for his second wife Juana Enriquez, a Castilian noblewoman (of a bastard cadet line from Castilian kings), who soon bore him a son, afterwards Ferdinand II of Aragon, and who regarded her stepson as an interloper. When Joanna began to interfere in the internal affairs of Navarre, a civil war broke out, and in 1452 Charles, although aided by King John II of Castile, was defeated and taken prisoner.
Released upon promising not to take the kingly title until after his father's death, the prince, again unsuccessful in an appeal to arms, took refuge in Naples with King Alfonso V of Aragon. In 1458 Alfonso died and John became king of Aragon, while Charles was offered the crowns of Naples and Sicily. He declined these proposals, and having been reconciled with his father, returned to Navarre in 1459. Aspiring to marry Isabella of Castile, he was then thrown into prison by his father, and the Catalans rose in his favor. This insurrection soon became general and John was obliged to yield. He released his son, and recognized him as perpetual governor of Catalonia, and heir to the kingdom.

== Death and legacy ==
Soon afterwards, however, on 23 September 1461, the prince died at Barcelona, not without a suspicion that he had been poisoned by his stepmother, Joanna Enriquez.

Charles was a cultured and amiable prince, fond of music and literature. He translated Aristotle's Ethics into Aragonese, a work first published at Zaragoza in 1509, and wrote a chronicle of the kings of Navarre, Cronica de los reyes de Navarra.

== Ancestry ==
Ancestors of Charles, Prince of Viana

8. John I of Castile
4. Ferdinand I of Aragon
9. Eleanor of Aragon
2. John II of Aragon
10. Sancho Alfonso
5. Eleanor of Alburquerque
11. Beatrice of Portugal
1. Charles IV of Navarre
12. Charles II of Navarre
6. Charles III of Navarre
13. Joan of Valois
3. Blanche I of Navarre
14. Henry II of Castile
7. Eleanor of Castile
15. Juana Manuel

Charles, Prince of Viana House of Trastámara Born: 29 May 1421 Died: 23 September 1461
Regnal titles
Preceded by Blanche I	— TITULAR — King of Navarre; 1441–1461; Reason for succession failure: Crown withheld by John II	Succeeded by Blanche II
Spanish nobility
New creation	Prince of Viana; 1423–1441	Succeeded by Eleanor
Vacant Title last held by Alfonso V	Prince of Girona and Count of Cervera; 1458–1461	Succeeded by Ferdinand II
Preceded by John II	Duke of Gandía; 1439–1461	Succeeded by Ferdinand II
