= Olite =

Olite / Erriberri: Olite (Spanish) Erriberri (Basque)
- Municipality
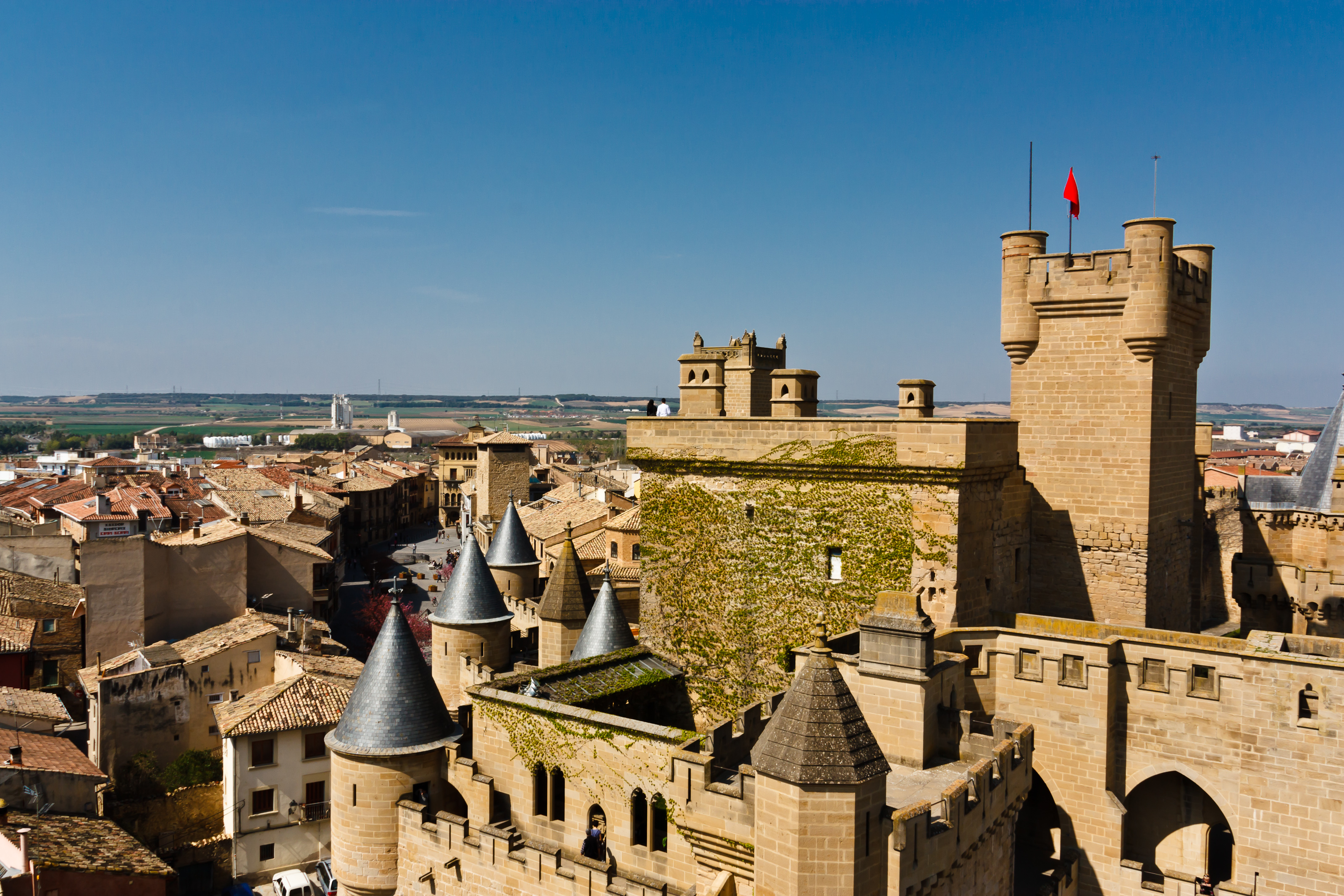

- Flag Coat of arms

- Location within Spain Location within Navarre
- Coordinates: 42°29′15″N 1°39′45″W
- Country: Spain
- Autonomous Community: Navarre
- Merindad: Merindad de Olite
- Comarca: Comarca de Tafalla
- Mancomunidad: Mairaga
- Municipality: Olite/Erriberri

Government
  - Mayor: Andoni Lacarra (Agrupemos Olite - Erriberri Elkartu)

Area
  - Total: 83.20 km^{2} (32.12 sq mi)
- Elevation: 388 m (1,273 ft)

Population (2025-01-01)
  - Total: 4,069
  - Density: 48.91/km^{2} (126.7/sq mi)
- Demonym(s): erriberritar; olitense/olitejo(a);
- Website: http://www.olite.es

Olite / Erriberri, officially Olite/Eriberri (in Spanish and Basque) is a town and municipality located in the Tafalla comarca, Erriberri merindad, in Navarre, Spain.

== History ==
According to Isidore of Seville's Historia de regibus Gothorum, Vandalorum et Suevorum, the town of Oligicus was founded by Swinthila, Visigothic King of Hispania (621–631) in order to control and punish the native Vascones people. However, this town was not heard of again until five centuries later, when the present-day town was founded and chartered. The Royal palace of Olite, a fine Gothic castle-palace, was the royal seat of Charles III of Navarre.

== Twin towns – sister cities ==
Town	State/Region	Country
Arthez-de-Béarn	Pyrénées-Atlantiques	France
Sauveterre-de-Guyenne	Gironde	France

== Notable people ==
- Blanche II of Navarre (1424–1464), titular queen of Navarre
- Eleanor of Navarre (1426–1479), queen of Navarre
- Justo Garrán Moso (1867–1942), Traditionalist politician
- Jesús García Leoz (1904–1953), Spanish composer
- Mariano Cañardo (1906–1987), Spanish cyclist
- Félix Ruiz Gabari (1940–1993), Spanish footballer
- Rafael Carlos Pérez González (born 1948), Spanish footballer

== Bibliography ==
- Alejandro Díez. Olite, historia de un reino. Gráficas Lizarra. 1984.
