= Pierre de Foix, le jeune =

French Roman Catholic bishop and cardinal

His Eminence Pierre de Foix
- Cardinal Bishop of Vannes
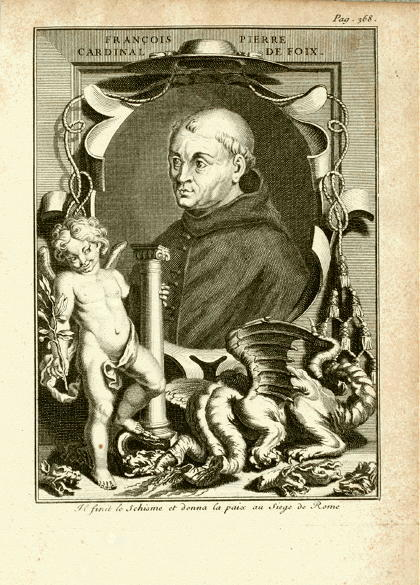
- Church: Roman Catholic
- Diocese: Vannes
- In office: 1476-1490
- Predecessor: Amalric de la Motte d’Acigné
- Successor: Amanieu d'Albret
- Other post: Cardinal-Deacon of San Sisto
- Previous posts: Bishop of Aire (1475-1476); Administrator of Aire (1476-1490); Administrator of Bayonne (1484-1490); Administrator of Palermo (1485-1490); Administrator of Malta (1489-1490)

Orders
- Created cardinal: 18 December 1476 by Sixtus IV
- Rank: Cardinal-Deacon

Personal details
- Born: February 7, 1449 Pau, Pyrénées-Atlantiques, France
- Died: August 10, 1490 (aged 41)
- Coat of arms

Peter of Foix the Younger (Fr.: Pierre de Foix, le jeune) (7 February 1449 – 10 August 1490) (called the Cardinal of Foix) was a French Roman Catholic bishop and cardinal.

== Biography ==
Pierre de Foix was born in Pau on February 7, 1449, the son of Gaston IV, Count of Foix, and his wife Eleanor of Navarre. He was the nephew of Louis XI of France and the grand-nephew of Cardinal Pierre de Foix, le vieux.

He studied at Paris and then at the University of Ferrara, from which he studied under Felino Maria Sandeo in the course of receiving a doctorate in law.

After graduation, he traveled to Rome, where he delivered an oration before Pope Paul II and the College of Cardinals. He joined the Order of the Friars Minor at this time. The pope made him a protonotary apostolic.

On May 17, 1475, he was elected Bishop of Vannes. Pope Sixtus IV confirmed his appointment on March 11, 1476 and Foix subsequently occupied this see until his death. On July 31, 1475, he was also named Bishop of Aire.

Pope Sixtus IV made him a cardinal deacon in the consistory of December 18, 1476. He received the red hat and the deaconry of Santi Cosma e Damiano on January 15, 1477. He served as apostolic administrator of the see of Bayonne from May 5, 1484 until his death.

He did not participate in the papal conclave of 1484 that elected Pope Innocent VIII.

He served as apostolic administrator of the metropolitan see of Palermo from May 14, 1485 until July 6, 1489.

Around 1485, he brokered a peace deal between Charles VIII of France and Francis II, Duke of Brittany. He later entered Rome on January 27, 1488 for an audience with the pope, departing the city in July 1488. He then traveled to the Kingdom of Naples to visit his friend Ferdinand I of Naples. He returned to Rome on October 15, 1488. On July 6, 1489, he was named apostolic administrator of the see of Malta, holding this position until his death.

He died in Rome on August 10, 1490. He was buried in the church dedicated to St. Tryphon which has since been demolished.
