= Francis Phoebus =

King of Navarre from 1479 to 1483

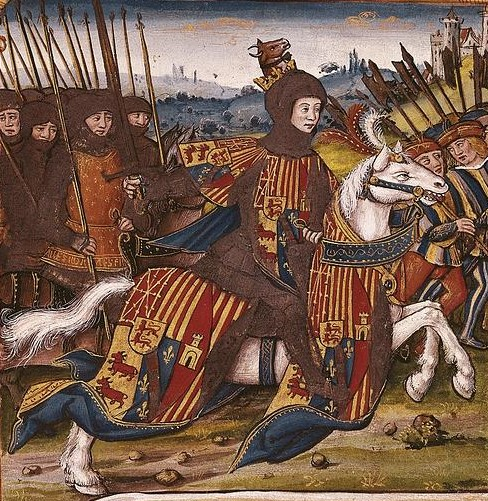

King of Navarre
- Reign: 12 February 1479 – 30 January 1483
- Coronation: 12 January 1479
- Predecessor: Eleanor
- Successor: Catherine
- Born: 4 December 1467; Bearn
- Died: 7 January 1483 (aged 15); Pau, Bearn
- House: Foix
- Father: Gaston, Prince of Viana
- Mother: Magdalena of France

Francis Phoebus (Basque: Frantzisko Febus, French: François Fébus, Occitan: Francés Fèbus, Spanish: Francisco Febo; 4 December 1467 – 7 January 1483) was King of Navarre (1479–1483), Viscount of Bearn, and Count of Foix (1472). He was the son of Gaston, Prince of Viana, and grandson of Queen Eleanor, whom he succeeded. She recommended him to ally with France.

He succeeded to the throne of Navarre in 1479 after the death of his grandmother Eleanor of Navarre. His succession was approved by the Agramont party, while the Beaumont party fell behind Ferdinand the Catholic who started to build up political and military pressure on the Kingdom of Navarre in the run-up to the fully-fledged invasion of 1512.

During his brief reign, he was under the protection of his mother, the regent Magdalena of Valois. He died young while playing the pipe, arguably poisoned. He was buried in Lescar.

== Sources ==
- Orpustan, Jean-Baptiste (2007). La Basse-Navarre dans la guerre de Navarre (1512-1530), récit historique, d'après Navarra, 1512-1530… de Pedro Esarte Muniain (Pamiela, Pamplona-Iruña 2001) [Lower Navarre in the War of Navarre (1512-1530), historical narrative, according to the book 'Navarra, 1512-1530: ...' by Pedro Esarte Muniain (Pamiela, Pamplona-Iruña 2001).] (PDF) (in French). Osses: Jean-Baptiste Orpustan. pp. 1–25 – via Tipirena.net.

Francis Phoebus House of Foix Born: 1469 Died: 1483
Regnal titles
Preceded by Gaston IV	Count of Foix; 1472–1483	Succeeded by Catherine
Preceded by Eleanor	King of Navarre; 1479–1483	Succeeded by Catherine
