= Eleanor of Navarre =

Queen of Navarre in 1479

Eleanor

Queen of Navarre
- Reign: 28 January 1479 – 12 February 1479
- Coronation: 28 January 1479
- Predecessor: John II
- Successor: Francis
- Born: 2 February 1426; Olite, Navarre
- Died: 12 February 1479 (aged 53); Tudela, Navarre
- Spouse: Gaston IV, Count of Foix (m. 1441; died 1472)
- Issue among others...: Gaston, Prince of Viana; Peter, Bishop of Vannes; John, Viscount of Narbonne; Margaret, Duchess of Brittany; Catherine, Countess of Candale; Jacques, Count of Montfort
- House: Trastámara
- Father: John II of Aragon
- Mother: Blanche I of Navarre
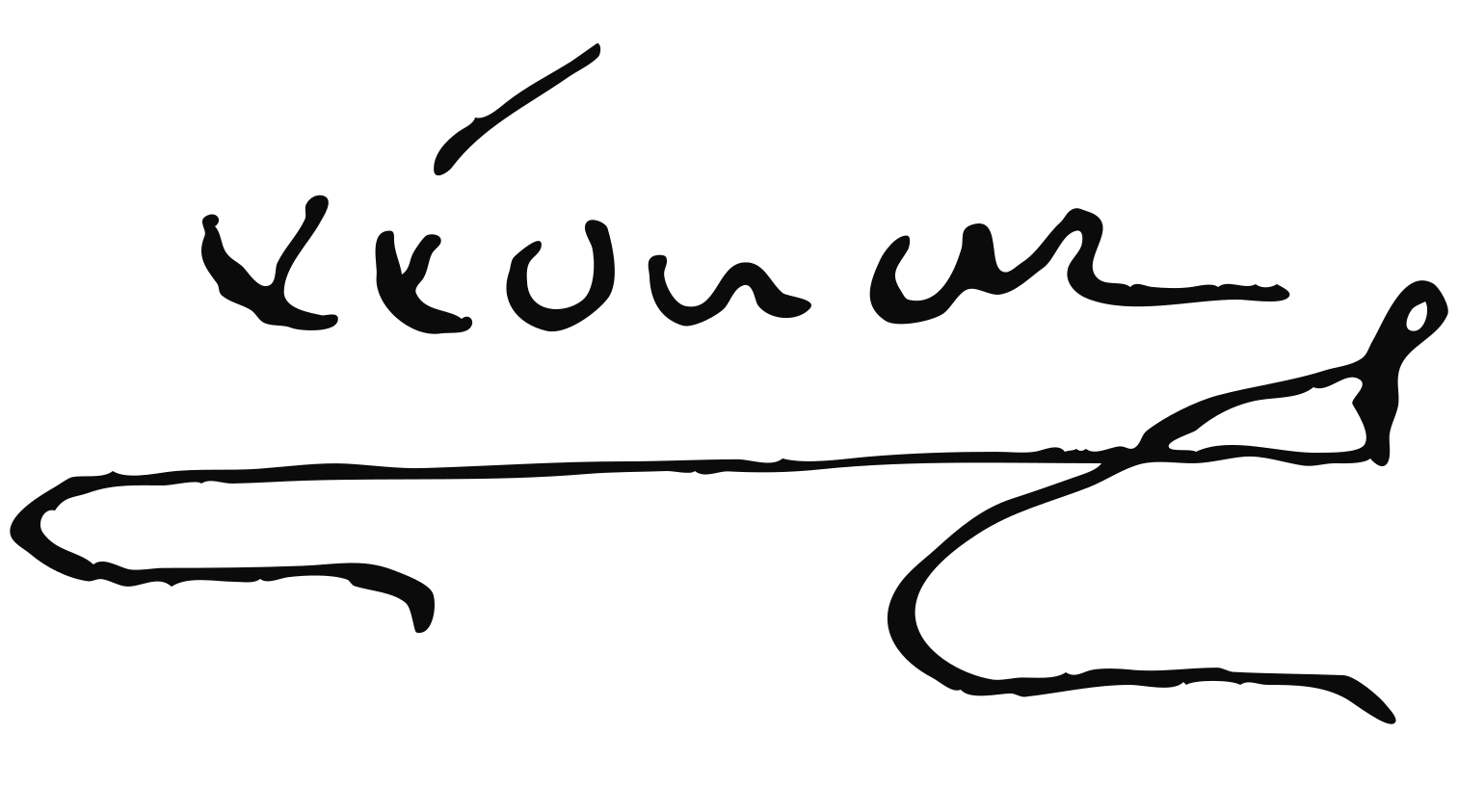
- Signature

Eleanor of Navarre (Note: (Basque: Leonor and Spanish: Leonor)) (2 February 1426 – 12 February 1479) was a Navarrese princess and monarch. She served as the regent of Navarre from 1455 to 1479, during the absence of her father, and then briefly as the queen regnant of Navarre in 1479. She was crowned on 28 January 1479 in Tudela.

== Life ==
Coat of arms of Queen Eleanor

She was born in Olite, Navarre (now Spain), the third and youngest child of King John II of Aragon and Queen Blanche I of Navarre. She was the younger sister of Blanche II of Navarre. She was born 2 February 1426, and was acclaimed by the Cortes in Pamplona, 9 August 1427, as the legitimate heir of Charles of Viana (Charles "IV") and Blanche II of Navarre in succession to their mother. After their mother's death, however, their father occupied Navarre.

She married Gaston IV, Count of Foix, in 1441. In 1442, Eleanor moved with her spouse to Bearn. In 1455, her father deposed her brother and her sister as heirs of Navarre and proclaimed Eleanor as the heir and the regent and general governor of Navarre. In her new capacities, she moved to Sangüesa. She continued as regent after the death of her brother in 1461. In 1462, she signed the Treaty of Olite, in which she recognized her father as the monarch of Navarre and accepted to have her sister Blanche imprisoned under her care.

In 1464, Blanche died in her care, suspected to have been poisoned. By the treaty, she was recognized by her father as the heir of Navarre and his regent (governor) in Navarre. In 1468, her father killed her advisor Nicolas de Etchabarri, and deposed her as governor. In 1471, however, her father recognized her as the governor of Navarre until his death. At her father's death in 1479, she gave her oath as the monarch of Navarre and died two weeks later at Tudela, Navarre, aged 53.

== Marriage and issue ==
In 1441, she married Gaston IV, Count of Foix, and had the following children with him:

- Marie of Foix (1443–1467); married William VIII of Montferrat.
- Gaston, Prince of Viana (1445–1470); married Magdalena of France in 1462. Their children Francis and Catherine both succeeded to Navarre in turn upon the death of their grandmother Eleanor.
- Pierre de Foix, le jeune (1449–1490); cardinal and Bishop of Arles.
- John of Foix, Viscount of Narbonne (1450–1500); his daughter Germaine of Foix was the second wife of Ferdinand II of Aragon.
- Jeanne of Foix (1454–1476); married Jean V of Armagnac.
- Eleanor of Foix (1457–1480); engaged firstly to Charles, duke de Guyenne (who died in 1472), and secondly to the Duke of Medinacelli, but died before the wedding.
- Margaret of Foix (1458–1487); married Francis II, Duke of Brittany; their daughter Anne of Brittany was the wife of Charles VIII of France and later the second wife of Louis XII of France.
- Catherine of Foix (1460–1494); married Gaston II de Foix, Count of Candale and Benauges; their daughter Anne of Foix-Candale was the third wife of Vladislaus II of Hungary.
- Isabella of Foix (1462–?); married Guy de Pons, Viscount of Turenne.
- Anne of Foix (born and died 1464).
- Jacques de Foix, Count of Montfort (1463–1508), Count of Cortes; married Catherine of Beaumont.

== Bibliography ==
- Anthony, R. (1931). Identification et Étude des Ossements des Rois de Navarre inhumés dans la Cathédrale de Lescar [Identification and Study of the Bones of the Kings of Navarre buried in the Cathedral of Lescar] (PDF). Archives du Muséum, 6e series (in French). Vol. VII. Masson et Cie.
- Krochalis, Jeanne E. (1996). "1494: Hieronymous Munzer, Compostela, and the Codex Calixtinus". In Dunn, Maryjane; Davidson, Linda Kay (eds.). The Pilgrimage to Compostela in the Middle Ages. Routledge.
- Ward, A.W.; Prothero, G.W.; Leathes, Stanley, eds. (1911). The Cambridge Modern History. Macmillan Company.
- Woodacre, Elena (2013). The Queens Regnant of Navarre: Succession, Politics, and Partnership, 1274-1512. Palgrave Macmillan.

Eleanor of Navarre House of Trastámara Born: 2 February 1426 Died: 12 February 1479
Regnal titles
Preceded by John II	Queen of Navarre; 1479	Succeeded by Francis
