= Gaston, Prince of Viana =

Navarrese infante (1445–1470)

Gaston
- Prince of Viana
- Born: 1445
- Died: 23 November 1470 (aged 24–25); Libourne
- Spouse: Magdalena of Valois
- Issue: Francis Phoebus, King of Navarre; Catherine, Queen of Navarre
- House: Foix
- Father: Gaston IV, Count of Foix
- Mother: Infanta Eleanor of Navarre (later Queen of Navarre)

Gaston, Prince of Viana, also called Gaston de Foix (French: Gaston, Spanish: Gastón, Basque: Gaston, 1445 – 23 November 1470), was the son and heir of Gaston IV, Count of Foix, and Infanta Eleanor of Navarre (later Queen of Navarre). As the expected successor to his mother and his grandfather, John II of Navarre, he was called Prince of Viana.

Gaston married Magdalena of Valois, a daughter of Charles VII of France and Marie of Anjou on 7 March 1461 at Lescar. They had two children:

- Francis Phoebus, 1467–1483, King of Navarre 1479–1483
- Catherine, 1470–1517, Queen-regnant of Navarre 1483–1517

Gaston died in 1470 from wounds received in a jousting tournament in Libourne, Aquitaine, before his accession to the throne of Navarre. Consequently, his children rose to the throne successively, but it was Gaston's wife Magdalena who actually pulled the strings of the crown until 1494.

== Sources ==
- Fletcher, Stella (2013). The Longman Companion to Renaissance Europe, 1390-1530. Routledge.
- Anthony, R. (1931). Identification et Étude des Ossements des Rois de Navarre inhumés dans la Cathédrale de Lescar [Identification and Study of the Bones of the Kings of Navarre buried in the Cathedral of Lescar] (PDF). Archives du Muséum, 6e series (in French). Vol. VII. Masson et Cie.
