= Madeleine of Valois (1443–1495) =

Regent of Navarre from 1479 to 1494

- Princess of Viana
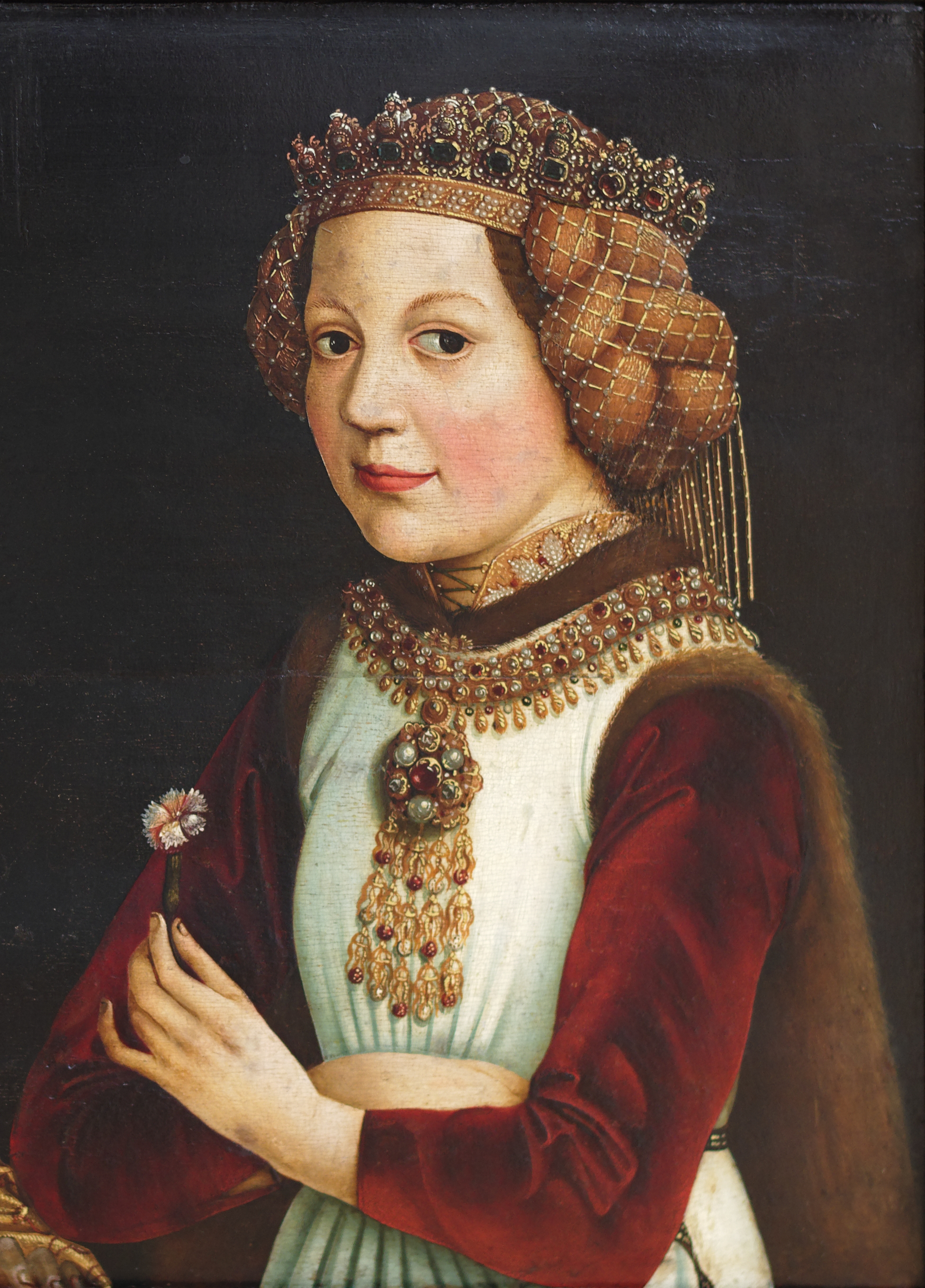
- Madeleine of France, as betrothed of Ladislaus the Posthumous, c. 1457
- Born: 1 December 1443; Tours
- Died: 21 January 1495 (aged 51); Pamplona
- Burial: Pamplona Cathedral
- Spouse: Gaston of Foix, Prince of Viana
- Issue: Francis Phoebus, King of Navarre; Catherine, Queen of Navarre
- House: Valois
- Father: Charles VII, King of France
- Mother: Marie of Anjou

Madeleine of France, also called Magdalene of Valois (1 December 1443 – 21 January 1495), was a French princess who became Princess of Viana by marriage to Gaston of Foix. She was the regent of Navarre between 1479 and 1494 during the minority of her two children, each of whom became monarchs of Navarre: Francis Phoebus and Catherine.

== Life ==
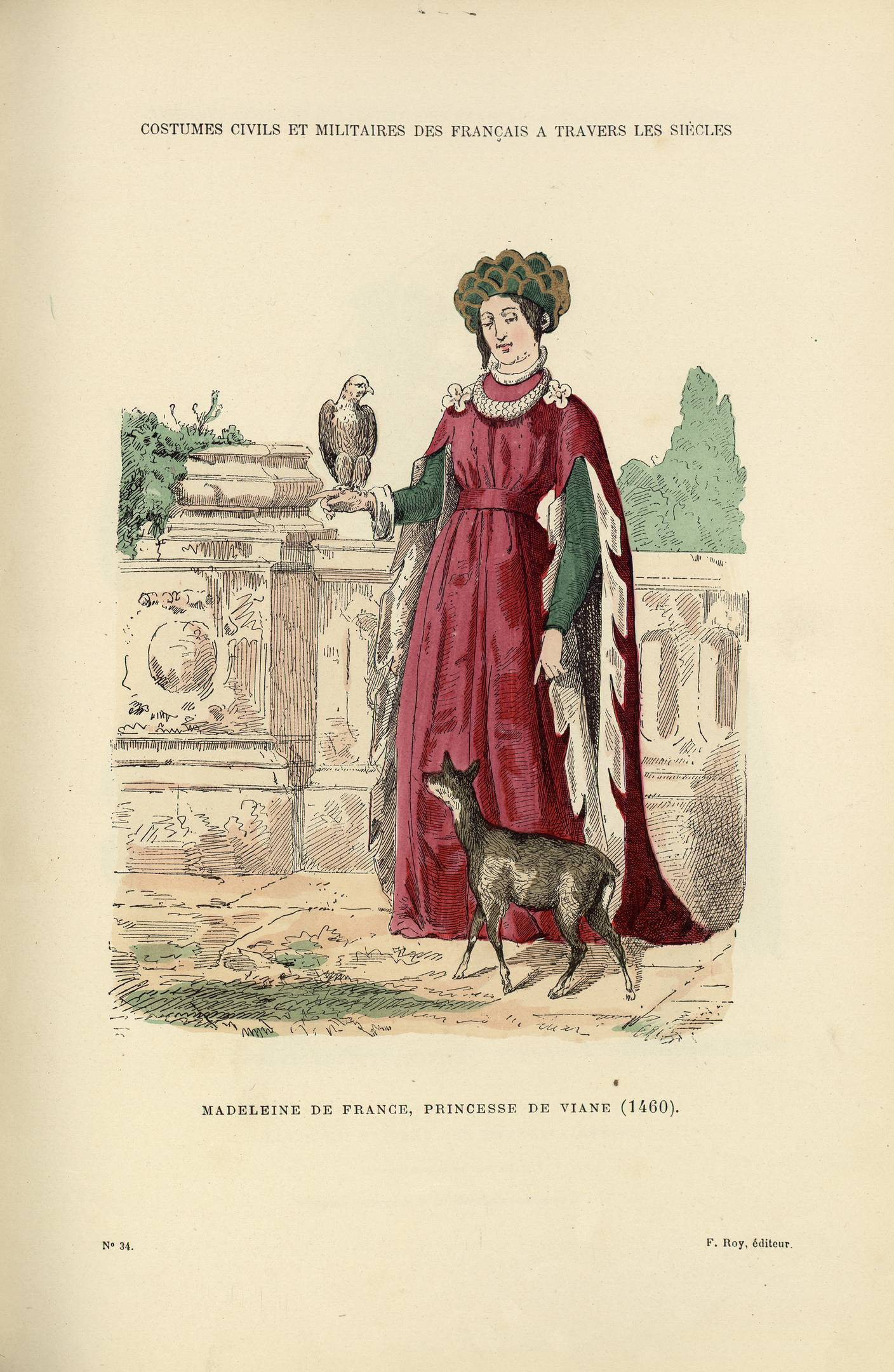
Magdalene of France, princess of Viana, 1460

She was born at Tours, a younger daughter of Charles VII of France and Marie of Anjou.

Magdalene was betrothed to Ladislaus the Posthumous, but he died suddenly in Prague on 23 November 1457 while preparing for his marriage. It was rumored at the time that his political opponents in Bohemia had poisoned him; but in the 20th century, it was proved that Ladislaus died of leukemia, not a recognized disease in that period.

She instead married Gaston, Prince of Viana, son and heir of Gaston IV of Foix and Eleanor of Navarre, at Saint-Jean-d'Angély in 1461.

=== Regent of Navarre ===
Her husband died in 1470, predeceasing his father; accordingly, when Gaston IV died in 1472, his possessions were inherited by Magdalene's son, Francis Phoebus. Francis became the heir of Navarre in 1479 upon the death of his great-grandfather, John II of Aragon and Navarre, who left Navarre to the rightful heir, Magdalene's mother-in-law, Eleanor. Eleanor only spent a few weeks as queen before she herself died.

Francis Phoebus became king, and his mother acted as regent until his death, at age 15, in 1483. Magdalene continued her regency, then for her daughter, Catherine, until 1494. During this regency, she was forced to battle her brother-in-law, John of Foix, who claimed the throne of Navarre as heir of Francis Phoebus.

In 1483, she arranged for her daughter to be married to a French nobleman on the suggestion of the King of France and refused the match with the heir to the throne of Castile and Aragon, in order to protect Navarre from being united with Castile and Aragon by a French alliance. The marital contract was signed in 1484 and the wedding of her daughter took place in 1486. Her daughter's marriage was not consummated until 1491. It is possible that the consummation, being a political event, was purposely postponed in order to prevent Catherine and her husband from being declared of legal majority, which would allow Magdalene to continue her regency. Magdalene continued to act as regent despite the fact that her daughter had given birth in 1491 and her marriage had clearly been consummated and, at the age of twenty-three, should no longer have the need of a minor regency. Her continued regency even after her daughter's coronation in 1494 is clearly evidenced, as it is documented that she continued to sign charters and was mentioned first officially as regent despite her daughter and son-in-law being adults.

Magdalene was taken hostage by Ferdinand II of Aragon in 1494. This ended her regency of Navarre and her daughter and son-in-law are confirmed to have been active rulers from this time onward. She died in the following year at Pamplona; her death provoking fresh conflict.

With the death of Charles VIII of France (Magdalene's nephew), the descendants of Charles VI of France ceased to occupy the French throne. By the death of Anne of France, Magdalene's niece, along with that of her elder sister Yolande, Duchess of Savoy, they became the last surviving legitimate descendants of Charles VII of France. Her descendant and heir, Henry III of Navarre, would become King of France in 1589 as Henry IV, returning the descendants and heirs of Charles VI and Charles VII to the French throne.

== Issue ==
She had two children:

- Francis Phoebus (1467–1483), King of Navarre
- Catherine (1470–1517), queen regnant of Navarre, married in 1484 John of Albret (1469–1516).

== Ancestry ==
Ancestors of Madeleine of Valois (1443–1495)

16. John II of France
8. Charles V of France
17. Bonne of Bohemia
4. Charles VI of France
18. Peter I, Duke of Bourbon
9. Joanna of Bourbon
19. Isabella of Valois
2. Charles VII of France
20. Stephen II, Duke of Bavaria
10. Stephen III, Duke of Bavaria
21. Elizabeth of Sicily
5. Isabeau of Bavaria
22. Bernabò Visconti
11. Taddaea Visconti
23. Beatrice della Scala
1. Magdalene of Valois
24. John II of France (= 16)
12. Louis I of Anjou
25. Bonne of Bohemia (= 17)
6. Louis II of Naples
26. Charles of Châtillon, Count of Blois
13. Marie of Châtillon
27. Jeanne of Penthièvre
3. Marie of Anjou
28. Peter IV of Aragon
14. John I of Aragon
29. Eleanor of Sicily
7. Yolande of Aragon
30. Robert I, Duke of Bar
15. Violante de Bar
31. Marie of France
