= List of Navarrese monarchs =

Monarchs of the Kingdom of Navarre

Coat of arms of the monarchs of Navarre since 1580–1700

This is a list of the kings and queens of Pamplona, later Navarre. Pamplona was the primary name of the kingdom until its union with Aragon (1076–1134). However, the territorial designation Navarre came into use as an alternative name in the late tenth century, and the name Pamplona was retained well into the twelfth century.

== House of Íñiguez, 824?–905 ==
The Íñiguez dynasty are credited with founding the Navarrese kingdom (of Pamplona) in or around 824 when they are said to have risen against an attempt to extend Frankish (Carolingian) authority into the region. The Cordoban sources referred to them as sometimes-rebellious vassals, rather than in the manner used to refer to the Christian realms outside their control. They were supplanted in 905 when an anti-Cordoba coalition placed the succeeding Jiménez dynasty in power.

Name	Portrait	Birth	Marriages	Death
Íñigo Arista; 824?–851/52	Íñigo Arista		4 children	851/52
García Íñiguez; 851/52–882		son of Íñigo Arista	Urraca; 5 children	882
Fortún Garcés; 882–905		son of García Íñiguez	Auria; 5 children	922 (deposed 905)

== House of Jiménez, 905–1234 ==
In 905, a coalition of neighbors forced Fortún Garcés to retire to a monastery, and enthroned in his place a scion of a new dynasty. Under their reign, the name Navarre began to supplant that of Pamplona.

Name	Portrait	Birth	Marriage(s)	Death
Sancho I Garcés; 905–925		son of García Jiménez and Dadildis de Pallars	Toda of Navarre; 6 children	11 December 925; Resa
Jimeno Garcés; 925–931		son of García Jiménez and Dadildis de Pallars	Sancha of Navarre; 3 children	29 May 931
García Sánchez I 931–970		919 son of Sancho I Garcés and Toda of Navarre	Andregota Galíndez of Aragón; 2 children Teresa Ramírez of León; 3 children	22 February 970 aged 51
Sancho II Garcés Abarca; 970–994		after 935 son of García Sánchez I and Andregota	Urraca Fernández; 4 children	December 994
García Sánchez II; 994–1000/04		son of Sancho II Garcés Abarca and Urraca Fernández	Jimena Fernández of Cea; 981; 4 children	1000/04
Sancho III the Great; 1004–1035	Sancho III the Great	985 son of García Sánchez II and Jimena Fernández of Cea	Muniadona of Castile; 1010; 4 children	18 October 1035
García Sánchez III; 1035–1054		1016 son of Sancho III the Great and Muniadona of Castile	Estefanía of Barcelona; 1038; 9 children	15 September 1054; Atapuerca
Sancho IV Garcés; 1054–1076		1039 son of García Sánchez III and Estefanía of Barcelona	Placencia; 1068; 3 children	4 June 1076; Peñalén

With the assassination of Sancho IV, Navarre was partitioned by his cousins Alfonso VI of León and Sancho Ramírez of Aragón, and the latter made king, leading to more than half a century of Aragonese control.

Name	Portrait	Birth	Marriage(s)	Death
Sancho V Ramírez; 1076–1094	Aragon	1042 son of Ramiro I of Aragón and Ermesinde of Bigorre	Isabel of Urgel; 1065; 1 child Felicia of Roucy; 1076; 3 children	4 June 1094; Huesca aged approximately 52
Peter; 1094–1104	Aragon	1068 son of Sancho Ramírez, King of Aragón and Navarre and Isabella of Urgel	Agnes of Aquitaine; 1086; 2 children Bertha of Aragón; 1097; No children	28 September 1104; Aran Valley aged approximately 36
Alfonso I the Battler; 1104–1134	Aragon	1073 son of Sancho Ramírez, King of Aragón and Navarre and Felicia of Roucy	Urraca of León; 1109; No children	8 September 1134; Huesca aged approximately 61

The death of Alfonso led to a succession crisis in Aragón and the nobles of Navarre took advantage to reestablish an independent monarchy, crowning a grandnephew (through an illegitimate brother) of the assassinated Sancho IV.

Name	Portrait	Birth	Marriage(s)	Death
García Ramírez the Restorer; 1134–1150	García Ramírez the Restorer	son of Ramiro Sánchez of Monzón and Cristina Rodríguez	Marguerite de l'Aigle; 1130; 4 children Urraca of León; 24 June 1144; 2 children	21 November 1150; Lorca
Sancho VI the Wise; 1150–1194		1133 son of García Ramírez and Marguerite de l'Aigle	Sancha of Castile; 1157; 6 children	27 June 1194; Pamplona
Sancho VII the Strong; 1194–1234	García Ramírez the Restorer	1157; Tudela son of Sancho VI of Navarre and Sancha of Castile	Constance of Toulouse; 1195; No children Clemence (of Hohenstaufen?) aft. 1201; 1 son	7 April 1234; Tudela

== House of Champagne, 1234–1284 ==
The death of Sancho VII, the last of the Jiménez kings, led to the crown of Navarre being inherited by the son of his sister Blanche, Countess of Champagne, she having been regent during much of her brother's reign.

Name	Portrait	Birth	Marriage(s)	Death
Theobald I the Posthumous; 1234–1253	House of Champagne	30 May 1201; Troyes son of Theobald III of Champagne and Blanche of Navarre	Gertrude of Dagsburg; 1220; No children Agnes of Beaujeu; 1222; 1 child Margaret of Bourbon; 1232; 6 children	8 July 1253; Pamplona aged 52
Theobald II the Young; 1253–1270	House of Champagne	1238 son of Theobald I of Navarre and Margaret of Bourbon	Isabelle of France; 6 April 1255; No children	4 December 1270; Trapani aged 32
Henry I the Fat; 1270–1274	House of Champagne	1244 son of Theobald I of Navarre and Margaret of Bourbon	Blanche of Artois; 1269; 2 children	22 July 1274 aged 30
Joan I 1274–1305	Joan	14 January 1271; Bar-sur-Seine daughter of Henry I of Navarre and Blanche of Artois	Philip IV of France; 16 August 1284; 7 children	4 April 1305; Château de Vincennes aged 34

== Capetian dynasty, 1284–1441 ==
=== House of Capet, 1284–1349 ===
Henry's unexpected death left his infant daughter Joan as the only heir to the throne. Joan's mother Blanche of Artois served as regent for the next ten years. In 1284 Joan was married to the future Philip IV of France, ending Blanche's regency. Philip assumed the throne of France a year later as "King of France and Navarre".

Name	Portrait	Birth	Marriage(s)	Death	Claim
Philip I the Fair; Philip IV of France; 1284–1305	House of Capet	1268; Fontainebleau son of Philip III of France and Isabella of Aragon	Joan I of Navarre; 16 August 1284; 7 children	29 November 1314; Fontainebleau aged 46	By the right of his wife, Joan I
Louis I the Quarreller; Louis X of France; 1305–1316	House of Capet	4 October 1289; Paris son of Philip IV of France and Joan I of Navarre	Margaret of Burgundy; 21 September 1305; 1 child Clementia of Hungary; 19 August 1315; 1 child	5 June 1316; Vincennes aged 26	By the right of his mother, Joan I
John I the Posthumous of France; 1316	House of Capet	15 November 1316; Paris son of Louis X of France and Clementia of Hungary	never married	20 November 1316; Paris; 5 days	By the right of his father, Louis X
Philip II the Tall; Philip V of France; 1316–1322	House of Capet	1292; Lyon son of Philip IV of France and Joan I of Navarre	Joan II, Countess of Burgundy; 1307; 7 children	3 January 1322; Longchamp aged 29	By the right of his mother, Joan I
Charles I the Fair; Charles IV of France; 1322–1328	House of Capet	19 June 1294; Clermont son of Philip IV of France and Joan I of Navarre	Blanche of Burgundy; 1307; 2 children Marie of Luxembourg; 1322; 2 children Jeanne d'Évreux; 1325; 3 children	1 February 1328; Vincennes aged 34	By the right of his mother, Joan I
Joan II; 1328–1349	House of Capet	28 January 1312; Charenton-le-Pont daughter of Louis X of France and Margaret of Burgundy	Philip III of Navarre; 8 children	6 October 1349; Charenton-le-Pont aged 37	By the right of her father, Louis X; By the right of the invitation of the general assembly

=== House of Évreux, 1328–1441 ===
After the deaths of Louis and his infant son John, his brothers Philip and Charles held the crowns of France and Navarre until their own deaths. At that time, the crown of France passed to Philip of Valois, a distant cousin who was not descended from Joan I, and the crown of Navarre was allowed to pass to Louis' daughter Joan II, despite her presumed illegitimacy. Joan reigned together with her husband Philip III until his death, and then alone until her own death.

Name	Portrait	Birth	Marriage(s)	Death
Philip III the Wise (jure uxoris); 1328–1343	House of Évreux	27 March 1306 son of Louis count of Evreux and Margaret of Artois	Joan II of Navarre; 8 children	16 September 1343; Jerez de la Frontera aged 37
Charles II the Bad; 1349–1387	House of Évreux	10 October 1332; Évreux son of Philip III of Navarre and Joan II of Navarre	Joan of France; 7 children	1 January 1387; Pamplona aged 54
Charles III the Noble; 1387–1425	House of Évreux	22 July 1361; Nantes son of Charles II of Navarre and Joan of France	Eleanor of Castile; 1375; 8 children	8 September 1425; Olite aged 64
Blanche Ι 1425–1441		1387; Castile daughter of Charles III of Navarre and Eleanor of Castile	Martin I of Sicily; 26 December 1402; 1 child John II of Aragon; 10 June 1420; 4 children	3 April 1441; Santa María la Real de Nieva aged 56

== House of Trastámara, 1425–1479 ==
Blanche I reigned together with her husband John II. In 1458, John additionally inherited the crown of Aragon from his older brother; after his death, the Navarrese crown was given to Eleanor, the only living child of him and Blanche, while his Aragonese crown was given to Ferdinand II of Aragon, son of John and his second wife Juana Enríquez.

Name	Portrait	Birth	Marriage(s)	Death
John II the Great; 1425–1441 (jure uxoris); 1425–1479 (de facto)	John II	29 June 1397; Medina del Campo son of Ferdinand I of Aragon and Eleanor of Alburquerque	Blanche; 6 November 1419; 4 children Juana Enríquez; 2 children	20 January 1479; Barcelona aged 81
Eleanor; 1479		2 February 1425; Olite daughter of John II of Aragon and Blanche I of Navarre	Gaston IV, Count of Foix; 11 children	12 February 1479; Tudela aged 54

=== Claimants ===
After Blanche's death in 1441, John retained the crown of Navarre for himself until he died 38 years later, keeping it from his son and elder daughter, Charles IV and Blanche II. Conflict with his son led to the Navarrese Civil War. Though some of the sources regard Charles and Blanche as the legitimate monarchs, the de facto king of Navarre was still John II. Eleanor did not claim to be the queen until her father's death.

Name	Portrait	Birth	Marriage(s)	Death
Charles IV; 1441–1461 (de jure, titular)	Charles of Viana	29 May 1421; Peñafiel son of John II of Aragon and Blanche I of Navarre	Agnes of Cleves; No children	23 September 1461; Barcelona aged 40
Blanche II; 1461–1464 (de jure, titular)		1424; Olite daughter of John II of Aragon and Blanche I of Navarre	Henry IV of Castile; No children	2 December 1464; Orthez aged 40

== House of Foix, 1479–1517 ==
Eleanor, who had allied with her father against her brother and sister, outlived her father by only three weeks. By that time she was the widow of Gaston IV, Count of Foix, and their oldest son Gaston of Foix, Prince of Viana had also died. She was thus succeeded by her grandson Francis.

Name	Portrait	Birth	Marriage(s)	Death
Francis Phoebus; 1479–1483		4 December 1467 son of Gaston of Foix, Prince of Viana, and Magdalena of Valois	never married	7 January 1483; Pau aged 15
Catherine; 1483–1517		1468 daughter of Gaston of Foix, Prince of Viana, and Magdalena of Valois	John III of Navarre; 13 children	12 February 1517; Mont-de-Marsan aged 49

== House of Albret, 1484–1516 ==
Catherine reigned together with her husband John III. After his death, she reigned alone for eight months until her own death. During their reign, Navarre was defeated by Ferdinand II of Aragon in 1512, resulting in the loss of all its territory south of the Pyrenees, including the royal capital of Pamplona. Ferdinand, the son of John II and his second wife and thus the half-brother of Catherine's grandmother Eleanor, was then crowned King of Navarre, and that branch of the title descended through the Aragonese and Spanish monarchs. Catherine and John III were left with Lower Navarre, that small fraction of the kingdom's former territory that is on the north side of the Pyrenees, which was united with other lands in France that were under their control.

Name	Portrait	Birth	Marriage(s)	Death
John III (jure uxoris); 1484–1516	Navarre-Albret	1469 son of Alain I of Albret and Francoise of Châtillon-Limoges	Catherine of Navarre; 13 children	14 June 1516; Pau aged 47

== House of Trastamara, 1512–1516 ==
Name	Portrait	Birth	Marriage(s)	Death
Ferdinand I 1512–1516		1452 son of John II of Navarre and Juana Enríquez	Isabella I of Castile; 5 children	23 January 1516; Madrigalejo aged 63

== Division of the kingdom ==
=== Lower Navarre ===
In 1530, Charles V decided to renounce definitively any claim to Lower Navarre due to the impossibility of controlling it, and because it was being effectively ruled by Henry II. However, Charles V and his mother Joana III continued as kings in Upper Navarre.

Catherine and John III were left with that small fraction of the kingdom's former territory that is on the north side of the Pyrenees, which was united with other lands in France that were under their control.

==== House of Albret, 1517–1572 ====
Name	Portrait	Birth	Marriage(s)	Death
Henry II; 1517–1555	Navarre-Albret	18 April 1503; Sangüesa son of John III of Navarre and Catherine of Navarre	Margaret of Angoulême; 1526; 2 children	25 May 1555; Hagetmau aged 52
Joana III; 1555–1572	Joan III	16 November 1528; Saint-Germain-en-Laye daughter of Henry II of Navarre and Margaret of Angoulême	Antoine of Navarre; 20 October 1548; 5 children	9 June 1572; Paris aged 43

==== House of Bourbon, 1572–1620 ====
Jeanne III reigned together with her husband Antoine until his death, and then alone until her own death. Their son Henry became King of France in 1589, taking possession of the kingdom in 1593 as the French Wars of Religion came to a close. Thereafter the crown of Navarre passed to the kings of France. In 1620, the Kingdom was merged into France; however, the French kings continued to use the title King of Navarre until 1791, and it was revived again from 1814 to 1830 during the Bourbon Restoration.

Name	Portrait	Birth	Marriage(s)	Death
Antoine (jure uxoris); 1555–1562	King Anthony	22 April 1518; La Fère, Picardy son of Charles, Duke of Vendôme, and Françoise of Alençon	Joan III of Navarre; 20 October 1548; 5 children	17 November 1562; Les Andelys, Eure aged 44
Henry III the Great; Henry IV of France; 1572–1610	Navarre-Albret	13 December 1553; Pau son of Antoine of Navarre and Joan III of Navarre	(1) Margaret of France; 18 August 1572 no issues (2) Marie de' Medici; 17 December 1600; 6 children	14 May 1610; Paris aged 56
Louis II the Just; Louis XIII of France; 1610–1620	Louis II	27 September 1601; Château de Fontainebleau son of Henry IV of France and Marie de' Medici	Anne of Spain; 24 November 1615; 6 children	14 May 1643; Paris aged 41

==== Titular Rulers of Navarre, 1620–1830 ====
Name	Portrait	Birth	Marriage(s)	Death
Louis II the Just; Louis XIII of France; 1620–1643	Louis II	27 September 1601; Château de Fontainebleau son of Henry IV of France and Marie de' Medici	Anne of Spain; 24 November 1615; 6 children	14 May 1643; Paris aged 41
Louis III the Sun King (Louis XIV of France); 1643–1715		5 September 1638; Chateau de Saint-Germain-en-Laye, Kingdom of France son of Louis XIII of France, and Anne of Spain	(1) Maria Theresa of Spain; 9 June 1660; 3 children (2) Françoise d'Aubigné, Marquise de Maintenon (private)	9 September 1715; Palace of Versailles, France aged 76
Louis IV the Beloved; Louis XV of France; 1715–1774		15 February 1710; Palace of Versailles son of Louis, Duke of Burgundy and Marie Adelaide of Savoy	Maria Leszczynska of Poland-Lithuania; 15 August 1725; 10 children	10 May 1774; Palace of Versailles aged 64
Louis V Louis XVI of France; 1774–1792		23 August 1754; Palace of Versailles son of Louis, Dauphin of France and Maria Josepha of Saxony, Dauphine of France	Maria Antonia of Austria; 19 April 1770; 4 children	21 January 1793; Paris, French First Republic aged 38

Restoration

Name	Portrait	Birth	Marriage(s)	Death
Louis VII the Desired; Louis XVIII of France (1) 1814–1815 (2) 1815–1824		9 October 1757; Palace of Versailles, Kingdom of France son of Louis, Dauphin of France and Maria Josepha of Saxony	Marie Josephine of Savoy; 14 May 1771; No children	16 September 1824; Paris, Kingdom of France aged 68
Charles V Charles X of France; 1824–1830; July Revolution		17 November 1755; Palace of Versailles, Kingdom of France son of Louis, Dauphin of France and Maria Josepha of Saxony	Maria Theresa of Savoy; 16 November 1773; 4 children	6 November 1836; Gorizia, Austrian Empire aged 79

=== Upper Navarre ===
==== House of Trastamara, 1516–1555 ====
Name	Portrait	Birth	Marriage(s)	Death
Joanna III; 1516–1555		6 November 1479 daughter of Ferdinand I of Navarre and Isabella of Castile	Philip, Duke of Burgundy; 6 children	12 April 1555; Tordesillas aged 75

==== House of Austria, 1516–1700 ====
Name	Portrait	Birth	Marriage(s)	Death
Charles IV; 1516–1556		24 February 1500 son of Philip, Duke of Burgundy and Joanna I of Castile	Isabella of Portugal; 3 children	21 September 1558; Yuste aged 58
Philip IV; 1556–1598		21 May 1527 son of Charles IV of Navarre and Isabella of Portugal	Maria Manuela of Portugal; 1 child Mary I of England; No children Elisabeth of Valois; 2 children Anna of Austria; 3 children	13 September 1598; Escorial aged 71
Philip V 1598–1621		14 April 1578 son of Philip IV of Navarra and Anna of Austria	Margaret of Austria; 5 children	31 March 1621; Madrid aged 42
Philip VI; 1621–1665		8 April 1605 son of Philip V of Navarra and Margaret of Austria	Elisabeth of Bourbon; 2 children Mariana of Austria; 2 children	17 September 1665; Madrid aged 60
Charles V 1665–1700		6 November 1661 son of Philip VI of Navarra and Mariana of Austria	Marie Louise of Orléans; No children Maria Anna of Neuburg; No children	1 November 1700; Madrid aged 38

==== House of Bourbon, 1700–1833 ====
Name	Portrait	Birth	Marriage(s)	Death
Philip VII; 1700–1724		19 December 1683 son of Louis Dauphin of France and Maria Anna Victoria of Bavaria	Maria Luisa of Savoy; 2 children Elisabeth Farnese; 6 children	9 July 1746; Madrid aged 62
Louis II; 1724		25 August 1707 son of Philip VII of Navarre and Maria Luisa of Savoy	Louise Elisabeth of Orléans; No children	31 August 1724; Madrid aged 17
Philip VII; 1724–1746		19 December 1683 son of Louis Dauphin of France and Maria Anna Victoria of Bavaria	Maria Luisa of Savoy; 2 children Elisabeth Farnese; 6 children	9 July 1746; Madrid aged 62
Ferdinand II; 1746–1759		23 September 1713 son of Philip VII of Navarre and Maria Luisa of Savoy	Barbara of Portugal; No children	10 August 1759; Madrid aged 45
Charles VI; 1759–1788		20 January 1716 son of Philip VII of Navarre and Elisabeth Farnese	Maria Amalia of Saxony; 13 children	14 December 1788; Madrid aged 72
Charles VII; 1788–1808		11 November 1748 son of Charles III of Spain and Maria Amalia of Saxony	Maria Luisa of Parma; 14 children	20 January 1819; Madrid aged 70
Ferdinand III; 1808–1833		14 October 1784 son of Charles IV of Spain and Maria Luisa of Parma	Maria Antonia of Naples and Sicily; No children Maria Isabel of Portugal; 2 children Maria Josepha Amalia of Saxony; No children Maria Christina of the Two Sicilies; 2 children	29 September 1833; Madrid aged 48
Isabella I 1833; 1833 territorial division of Spain		10 October 1830 daughter of Ferdinand VII of Spain and Maria Christina of Naples and Sicily	Francis of Spain; 5 children	9 April 1904; Paris, French Third Republic aged 73

==== Regents ====
Name	Portrait	Birth	Marriage(s)	Death
Juan Martínez de Medrano for Joan II of Navarre on 13 March 1328 after the death of the last Capetian King of France		13th Century son of Don Juan Martinez de Medrano	Aldonza Sánchez, 7 children	May 1337 – 1338 Kingdom of Navarre

Name	Portrait	Birth	Marriage(s)	Death
Garcia de Medrano y Alvarez de los Rios for King Philip IV of Spain on 17 January 1645; Elected Regent of Navarre		Navarre, 1604 son of García de Medrano, Lord of San Gregorio, and María Álvarez de los Ríos y Mendoza	Married to María Ignacia de Mendizábal y Uribe; 1 child	3 September 1683 Kingdom of Spain

Name	Portrait	Birth	Marriage(s)	Death
Pedro Antonio de Medrano y Albelda for King Philip V of Spain; On 9 May 1702; Elected Regent of Navarre		14 Dec 1642 Calahorra, La Rioja, Spain son of Don Pedro de Medrano Echauz and Josepha de Albelda Barron y Tejada	Married to Teresa Josefa Alvarez de Arellano Echauz y Velasco; 1 child	December 1721 Kingdom of Spain; Age 71

Name	Portrait	Birth	Marriage(s)	Death
Maria Christina of Naples and Sicily for her daughter, Isabella; 1833; 1833 territorial division of Spain		27 April 1806 daughter of Francis I of the Two Sicilies and Maria Isabella of Spain	Ferdinand VII of Spain; 2 children	22 August 1878; Le Havre, French Third Republic aged 72

== Current claimants ==
- Prince Louis, Duke of Anjou, is the current Legitimist claimant to the kingdoms of France and (Lower) Navarre. His claim to the Navarrese throne is based on its unification with the French throne under Louis XIII, excluding any subsequent female succession following French succession law.
- Jean, Count of Paris, is the current Orleanist claimant to the kingdoms of France and (Lower) Navarre. His claim to the Navarrese throne is based on its unification with the French throne under Louis XIII, excluding any subsequent female succession following French succession law.
- Felipe VI of Spain uses the title King of Navarre (Upper Navarre) as part of his more extended titulary, inherited from earlier monarchs of Spain (Castile and Aragon) and based on the conquest of the majority of the ancient kingdom by Ferdinand II of Aragon.
- Prince Sixtus Henry of Bourbon-Parma (Carlist claimant to the throne of Spain) claims the title King of Navarre (Upper Navarre) as all titles of the Hispanic Monarchy based on the conquest of the ancient kingdom by Ferdinand II of Aragon. He considers himself legitimate successor about the traditional laws of Catholic Monarchy of Spains of Carlos María Isidro.

The de facto rulers of Navarre are the King of Spain for Upper Navarre (currently Felipe VI) and the French president for Lower Navarre (currently Emmanuel Macron, who is also an ex officio co-prince of the Principality of Andorra).

== See also ==
- Alterations of Aragon
- King of Viguera
- Kings of Navarre family tree
- List of Navarrese royal consorts
- List of Spanish monarchs

== Sources ==
- Mugica, Fernando Chavarria (2007). "Local Constraints for a Global Monarchy: Sustaining the Garrison of Fuenterrabbia in the 16th Century". In Hernán, Enrique García; Maffi, David (eds.). Guerra y sociedad en la monarquía hispánica: política, estrategia y cultura en la Europa moderna (1500-1700). Vol. 1. CSIC.
