= Gaston IV of Foix =

Co-Prince of Andorra and Count of Foix

Gaston IV
- Count of Foix
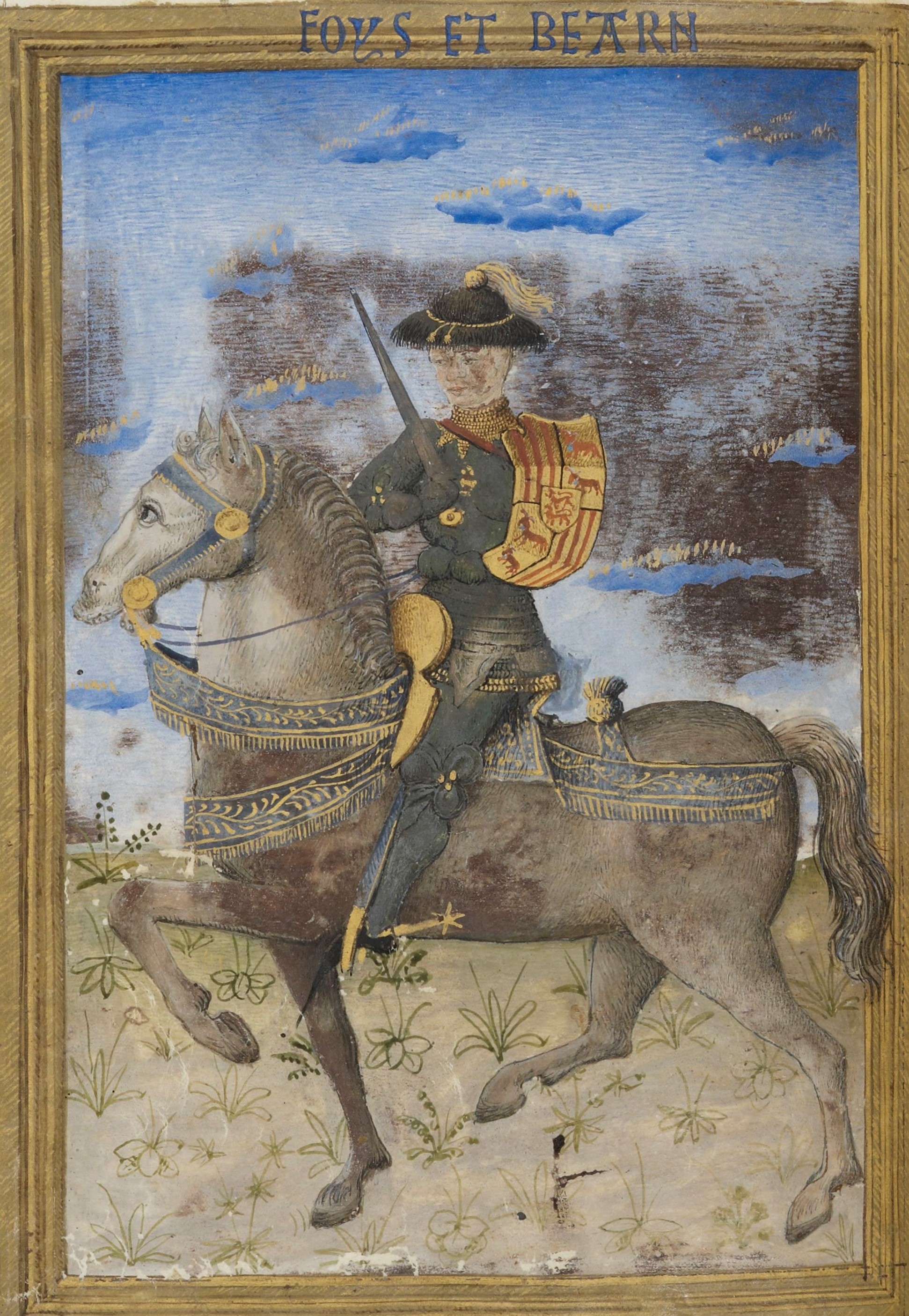
- Gaston depicted in the Armorial of Gilles Le Bouvier (Héraut Berry), ca 1455
- Born: 27 November 1422
- Died: 25 or 28 July 1472 (aged 49); Roncesvalles
- Spouse: Eleanor of Navarre (m. 1441)
- Issue among others...: Gaston, Prince of Viana; Peter, Bishop of Vannes; John, Viscount of Narbonne; Margaret, Duchess of Brittany; Catherine, Countess of Candale; Jacques, Count of Montfort
- House: Foix
- Father: John I, Count of Foix
- Mother: Jeanne I d’Albret (1403-1433)

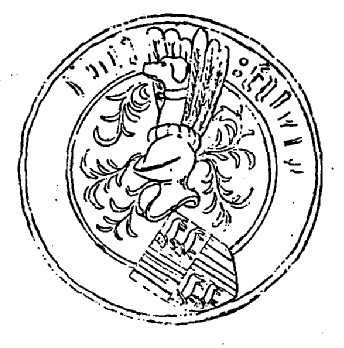
Seal of Gaston IV, Count of Foix

Gaston IV (27 November 1422 – 25 or 28 July 1472) was the viscount of Béarn and the count of Foix and Bigorre in France from 1436 to 1472. He also held the viscounties of Marsan, Castelbon, Nébouzan, Villemeur and Lautrec and was, by virtue of the County of Foix, co-prince of Andorra. From 1447, he was also viscount of Narbonne.

Gaston was the son of John I, Count of Foix, and Jeanne I d'Albret.

Gaston married Eleanor of Navarre in 1441. Her parents were King John II and Queen Blanche I of Navarre. At the time, Eleanor appeared to have few prospects: her father was the younger son and brother of kings of Aragon, and she had two older siblings, Charles and Blanche, standing between herself and the throne of Navarre. However, family dissent and death eliminated both her siblings; Eleanor's father usurped the Navarrese crown, to which he added in 1458 the throne of Aragon (his older brother having died without legitimate children). Following the deaths of Charles and Blanche, King John promised the succession to Navarre to Eleanor and Gaston in return for their loyalty to him, which was given.

When Gaston IV died in 1472, his eldest son Gaston, Prince of Viana, had already died, and he was succeeded as count of Foix by the latter's son Francis Phoebus who was only 5 years old, under the regency of his grandmother and Gaston IV's wife Eleanor.

== Children ==
Gaston and Eleanor had:

- Gaston (1443–1470), (sometimes called “Gaston V of Foix”), viscount of Castelbon, prince of Viana (1462–1470), lieutenant general of Navarre (1469)
- John (1450–1500), viscount of Narbonne (1468–1500), count d'Étampes (1478–1500)
- Margaret (1449–1486), duchess of Brittany
- Peter (7 February 1449 – 10 August 1490), cardinal, viceroy of Navarre (1479–1484)
- Marie (c. 1452–1467), wife of Marquis William VIII of Montferrat
- Joan (c. 1454 – c. 1476), wife of Count John V of Armagnac (1420-1473).
- Catherine (c. 1460 – before 1494), countess of Candale
- Isabel (after 1462)
- Eleanor (after 1466 – died young)
- James (1469 – in France 1500), count de Montfort

== Sources ==
- Higounet, Charles, ed. (1974). La seigneurie et le vignoble de Château Latour : histoire d'un grand cru du Médoc, XIVe-XXe siècle (in French). Fédération historique du Sud-Ouest.
- Krochalis, Jeanne E. (1996). "1494: Hieronymous Munzer, Compostela, and the Codex Calixtinus". In Dunn, Maryjane; Davidson, Linda Kay (eds.). The Pilgrimage to Compostela in the Middle Ages. Routledge.
- Vernier, Richard (2008). Lord of the Pyrenees: Gaston Fébus, Count of Foix (1331-1391). The Boydell Press.
- Ward, A.W.; Prothero, G.W.; Leathes, Stanley, eds. (1911). The Cambridge Modern History. Macmillan Company.
- Woodacre, Elena (2013). The Queens Regnant of Navarre: Succession, Politics, and Partnership, 1274-1512. Palgrave Macmillan.

Gaston IV of Foix House of Foix Born: 27 November 1422 Died: July 1472
| Preceded by John I | Count of Foix; 1436–1472 | Succeeded by Francis Phoebus |
