= History of perfume =

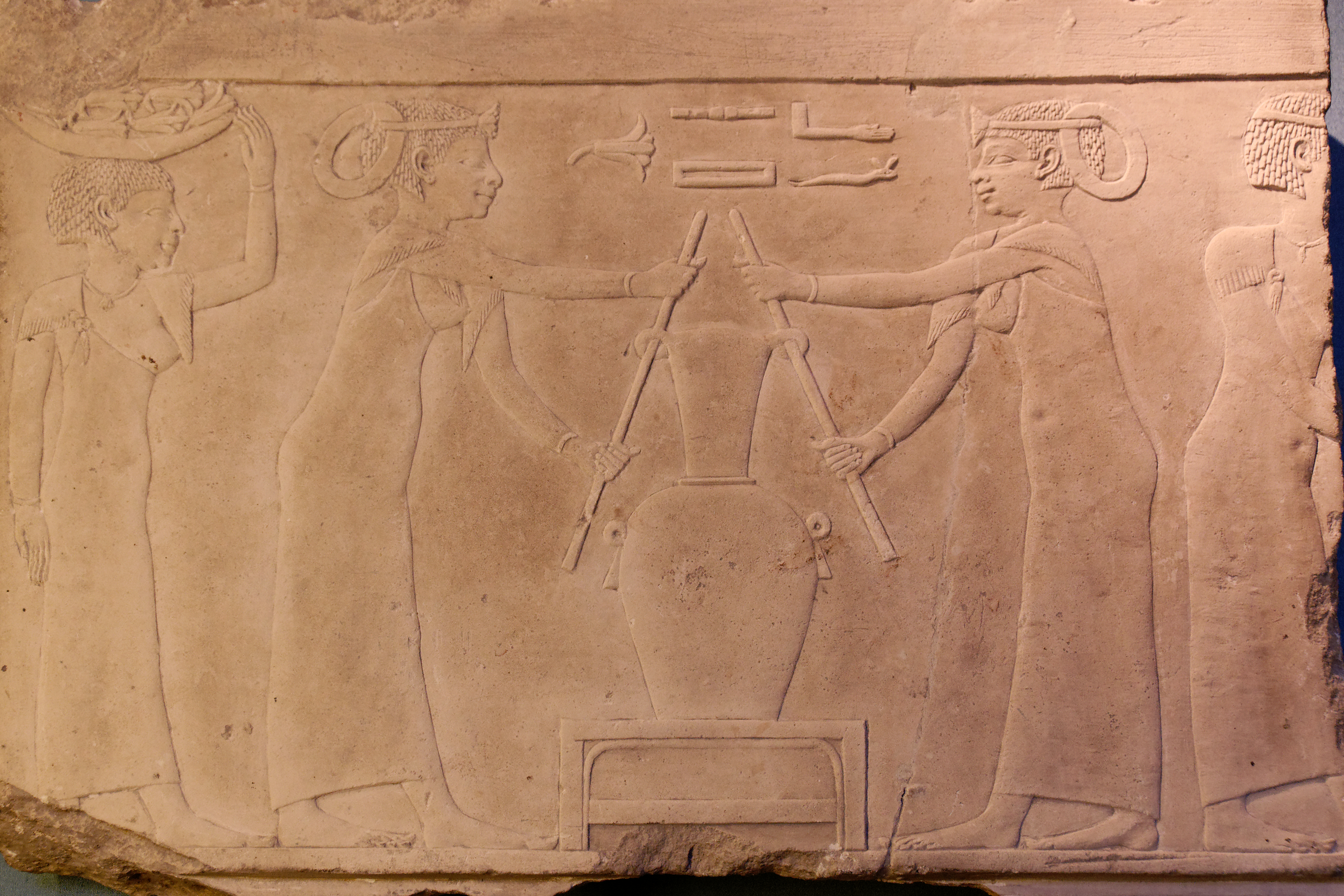
Egyptian scene depicting the preparation of Lily perfume

The word perfume is used today to describe scented mixtures and is derived from the Latin word per fumus (lit. 'through smoke'). The word perfumery refers to the art of making perfumes. Perfume was produced by ancient Greeks, and perfume was also refined by the Romans, the Persians and the Arabs. Although perfume and perfumery also existed in East Asia, much of its fragrances were incense based. The basic ingredients and methods of making perfumes are described by Pliny the Elder in his Naturalis Historia.

== Mesopotamia ==
The world's first recorded chemist is a woman named Tapputi, a perfume maker whose existence was recorded on a 1200 BCE Cuneiform tablet in Babylonian Mesopotamia. She held a powerful role in the Mesopotamian government and religion, as the overseer of the Mesopotamian Royal Palace. She developed methods for scent extraction techniques that would lay the basis for perfume making. She recorded her techniques and methods and those were passed on, with her most groundbreaking technique in using solvents. Furthermore Sassanian Emperors used rose water as perfume in their celebrations.

== South Asia ==
Perfume and perfumery also existed in Indus civilization, which existed from 3300 BCE to 1300 BCE. One of the earliest distillation of Ittar was mentioned in the Hindu Ayurvedic text Charaka Samhita and Sushruta Samhita. The perfume references are part of a larger text called Brihat-Samhita written by Varāhamihira, an Indian astronomer, mathematician, and astrologer living in the city of Ujjain. He was one of the ‘nine jewels’ in the court of Chandragupta II. The perfume portion mainly deals with the manufacture of perfumes to benefit ‘royal personages’. The text is written as Sanskrit slokas with commentary by a 10th-century Indian commentator Utpala..

== Cyprus ==
To date, the oldest perfumery was discovered on the island of Cyprus. Excavations in 2004-2005 under the initiative of an Italian archaeological team unearthed evidence of an enormous factory that existed 4,000 years ago during the Bronze Age. This covered an estimated surface area of over 0.4 hectares (0.99 acres) indicating that perfume manufacturing was on an industrial scale. The news of this discovery was reported extensively through the world press and many artifacts are already on display in Rome.

The Bible describes a sacred perfume (Exodus 30:22-33) consisting of liquid myrrh, fragrant cinnamon, fragrant cane, and cassia. Its use was forbidden, except by the priests. The women wore perfume to present their beauty.

== Islamic ==
Iranians after Islamic era contributed significantly to the development of Middle Eastern perfumery in two significant areas: perfecting the extraction of fragrances through steam distillation and introducing new raw materials. Both have greatly influenced Western perfumery and scientific developments, particularly chemistry.

With a rise of Islam, Iranians improved perfume production and continued to use perfumes in daily life and in practicing religion. They used musk, roses and amber, among other materials. As traders, Islamic cultures such as the Persians had wider access to a wide array of spices, resins, herbs, precious woods, and animal fragrance materials such as ambergris and musk. In addition to trading, many of the flowers and herbs used in perfumery were cultivated by the Iranians — rose and jasmine were native to the Iran region, and many other plants (i.e.: bitter orange and other citrus trees, all of which imported from China and southeast Asia) could be successfully cultivated in the Middle East, and are to this day key ingredients in perfumery.

In Islamic culture, perfume usage has been documented as far back as the 6th century and its usage is considered a religious duty. Muhammad said:

The taking of a bath on Friday is compulsory for every male Muslim who has attained the age of puberty and (also) the cleaning of his teeth with Miswaak (type of twig used as a toothbrush), and the using of perfume if it is available. (Recorded in Sahih Bukhari).

They often used to blend extracts with the cement of which mosques were built. Such rituals gave incentives to scholars to search and develop a cheaper way to produce incenses and in mass production.

The Arabic philosopher al-Kindi (c. 801–873) wrote a book on perfumes called ‘Book of the Chemistry of Perfume and Distillations’. It contained more than a hundred recipes for fragrant oils, salves, aromatic waters and substitutes or imitations of costly drugs. The book also described one hundred and seven methods and recipes for perfume-making, and even the perfume making equipment, like the alembic, still bears its Arabic name.

The Persian Muslim doctor and chemist Ibn Sina (also known as Avicenna) introduced the process of extracting oils from flowers by means of distillation, the procedure most commonly used today. He first experimented with the rose. Until his discovery, liquid perfumes were mixtures of oil and crushed herbs, or petals which made a strong blend. Rose water was more delicate, and immediately became popular. Both of the raw ingredients and distillation technology significantly influenced western perfumery and scientific developments, particularly chemistry.

Arabian perfume arrived to European courts through Al-Andalus in the west, and on the other side, with the crusaders in the east. For instance, eggs and floral perfumes were brought to Europe in the 11th and 12th centuries from Arabia, by returning crusaders, through trade with the Islamic world. Those who traded for these were most often also involved in trade for spices and dyestuffs. There are records of the Pepperers Guild of London, going back to 1179; which show them trading with Muslims in spices, perfume ingredients and dyes. Catharina de Medici initiated the perfume industry in Europe when she left Italy in the 16th century to marry the French crown prince.

== Classical antiquity ==
Romans and Greek extracted perfumes from diverse sources such as flowers, woods, seeds, roots, saps, gums. Theophrastos (ca. 270–285 BCE; On Odors), Pliny the Elder (23–79 CE; Natural History), and Dioskourides (ca. 40–90 CE; On Medical Material) all discussed perfumery.

In Theophrastus’ On Odours, he noted down the perfume making process of his time. Unlike how we commonly use diluted ethanol as perfume bases in modern times, the ancient Greeks used various types of oils as the “vehicle” of perfumes. The oils they chose needed to be as odourless as possible, as pungent oils will overpower the natural fragrance of the other raw materials used in the perfume. Such oils include the Egyptian or Syrian balanos oil, while the most common type of olive oil they used was derived from “raw” and “coarse” olives, as the oil they produce is the least greasy and coarse. This kind of olive oil is expected to be used quickly, as the oil will turn thick and “viscous” over time, which is not ideal for perfumery. To combine everything together, the perfume mixture would usually be boiled, with the ingredients dissolving under gentle fire. The sediments would then be strained away. However, this manufacturing process is not the only way the ancient Greeks made their perfumes. Other than liquid perfume, they could also come in the form of “unguents”, solids and powders.

As for the common ingredients, or notes, the ancient Greeks used, it seems that they mainly used spices, florals, and resins for perfumery. They would also use the roots of a plant; sufficient to say, it appears that the whole plant can be used for creating perfumes. For florals, rose was one of the most common ingredients in their perfumes, as Pliny the Elder describes them as “a flower that grows everywhere”. Rose fragrances are described as “light” and have less imposing or less powerful scents. They can be used to lighten and weaken other compound perfumes that have stronger odours, though the effect is only temporary. Other common florals include iris and lily, while common herbs or spices include spikenard, saffron, cardamom and marjoram, with myrrh and frankincense being common resins. According to Theophrastus, any “bruising” of a plant, likely referring to physical damage, may impact the odour of it. Perfume ingredients made from roots of a plant may benefit from bruising, while those derived from the plant’s flowers are more fragrant if they are fresh and undamaged.

There was a popular perfume named “megaleion”, possibly created sometime during the 3rd century BC, named after its perfumer, Megallus. Megaleion was made from the combination of burnt resin or lacquer, myrrh, cassia, and cinnamon. While there were certainly cheaper variations and blends of perfume that were not exclusive to the rich, they were usually quite expensive. The production of perfume often included the use of spices, and some of them such as cinnamon and cassia were difficult to obtain as they did not grow locally. Using cinnamon, one of the ingredients of megaleion, as an example, Pliny the Elder wrote that the “price of unguent of cinnamon is quite enormous”. He described perfumes as “objects of luxury” and “the most superfluous” compared to other materialistic goods like jewels due to their poor durability. He noted that perfumes could exceed “four hundred denarii per pound”, which was a large sum during that period.

To use perfume on the body, the ancient Greeks discovered that fragrances linger longer on the skin when applied on the inner wrists. While the people of Theophrastus’ time never found out why that is, we now know that the phenomenon is due to our wrists being pulse points. This results in the increase of body heat, allowing the fragrance to emit more. Both men and women alike used perfume, but it was believed that some fragrances are more suited to a specific gender. This gender divide is not determined by the scent of perfumes, however. Instead, it largely depended on the longevity of the perfume and the strength of its odour. On one hand, rose, lily, and Cyprus perfumes were known to be the lightest fragrances of their time, which made them more suited for men. On the other hand, myrrh oil, megaleion, the Egyptian, sweet marjoram, and spikenard perfumes were relatively stronger with a high longevity, which made them more suited for women. The ancient Greeks would also use powdered perfume on their beddings so that they would cling onto the skin, giving them a long-lasting and pleasant odour.

Aside from using perfume as fragrances, it was believed that they have certain medicinal properties due to their abundance of herbs and spices. For instance, the aforementioned megaleion in particular was rumored to have healing properties. It was mainly used to heal wounds and relieve inflammation. Others like rose perfumes were believed to be “good for the ears” as salt is involved in its production process. Iris perfumes also acted as a laxative. Theophrastus provided a reason as to why they work: their ingredients bore astringent and drying properties, hence gaining medicinal properties. However, megaleion and other perfumes with strong scents could also cause headaches, which might have been a possible side effect of sorts when performing as medicine. Other than using perfume externally or for topical applications, the ancient Greeks would drink perfume as well, though not directly on its own. Instead, they would use it as flavouring for wine, claiming that “they give a pleasant taste” to it. They did not, however, use perfume to flavour other kinds of food and drink as it would typically lead to spoilage and bitterness, ruining their original taste.

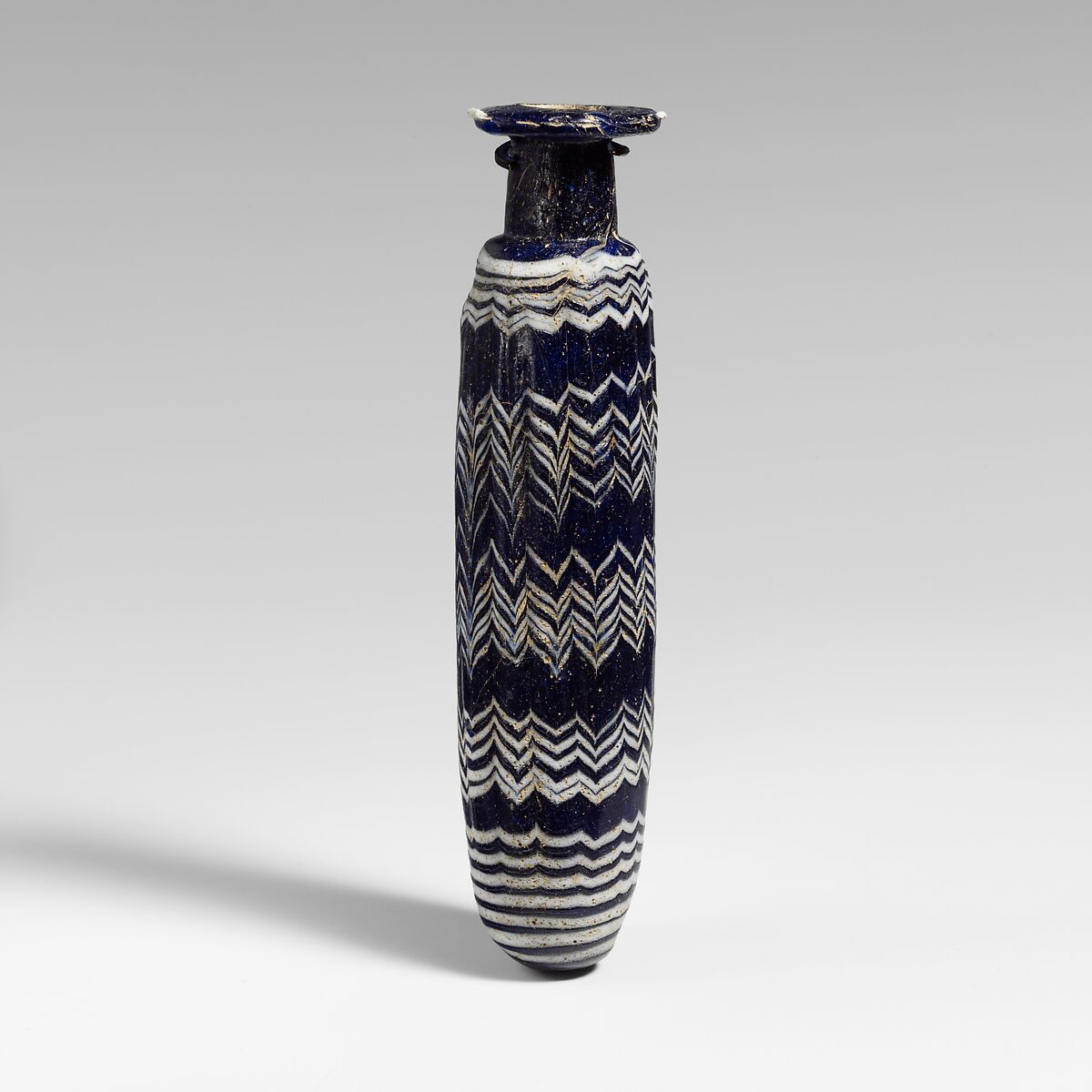
Glass alabastron (perfume bottle), Greek, Eastern Mediterranean, late 4th–early 3rd century BCE, from the collection of The Metropolitan Museum of Art.

Similar to how we store perfume today, the ancient Greeks knew that sunlight can negatively impact the quality of perfume over time. To avoid perfumes coming into contact with the sun or excessive heat, they would store them in shaded upper rooms. Vessels made from lead, glass or phials of alabaster would be used to contain the perfumes as these materials are of “cold and of close texture”. These characteristics can hence reduce evaporation and prevent the escaping of odours to prolong the shelf life of perfumes. As these perfume bottles had been a type of pottery back in the day, the ancient Greeks also added individual designs and paintings on them like they do on other vases. For example, they would add on colours including red, blue, black, or white, adorned with rows of geometric patterns.

A temple to Athena in Elis, near Olympia, was said to have saffron blended into its wall plaster, allowing the interior to remain fragrant for 500 years. In May 2018, an ancient perfume "Rodo" (Rose) was recreated for the Greek National Archaeological Museum's anniversary show "Countless Aspects of Beauty", allowing visitors to approach antiquity through their olfaction receptors.

== Europe ==
In Ancient Rome, a perfume salesman would be called Seplasarius, the name deriving from a street in Capua where perfumes of high quality were made.

Recipes of perfumes from the monks of Santa Maria Delle Vigne or Santa Maria Novella of Florence, Italy, were recorded from 1221. But it was the Hungarians who ultimately introduced the first modern perfume. The first modern perfume, made of scented oils blended in an alcohol solution, was made in 1370 at the command of Queen Elizabeth of Hungary and was known throughout Europe as Hungary Water. The art of perfumery prospered in Renaissance Italy, and in the 16th century, Italian refinements were taken to France by Catherine de' Medici's personal perfumer, Rene le Florentin. His laboratory was connected with her apartments by a secret passageway, so that no formulas could be stolen en route.

=== France ===
France quickly became the European center of perfume and cosmetic manufacture. Cultivation of flowers for their perfume essence, which had begun in the 14th century, grew into a major industry in the south of France mainly in Grasse now considered the world capital of perfume. During the Renaissance period, perfumes were used primarily by royalty and the wealthy to mask body odors resulting from the sanitary practices of the day. Partly due to this patronage, the western perfumery industry was created. Perfume enjoyed huge success during the 17th century. Perfumed gloves became popular in France and in 1656, the guild of glove and perfume-makers was established. Perfumers were also known to create poisons: for instance, in 1572 Jeanne d'Albret, protestant queen of Navarre, was supposedly murdered on the instruction of Catherine de Medici, the Catholic queen of France, when a poison prepared by Catherine's perfumer, René le Florentin, was rubbed into a pair of perfumed gloves. When they were worn, the substance was slowly absorbed into the victim's skin.

Perfume came into its own when Louis XV came to the throne in the 18th century. His court was called "la cour parfumée" (the perfumed court). Madame de Pompadour ordered generous supplies of perfume, and King Louis demanded a different fragrance for his apartment every day. The court of Louis XIV was even named due to the scents which were applied daily not only to the skin but also to clothing, fans and furniture. Perfume substituted for soap and water. The use of perfume in France grew steadily. By the 18th century, aromatic plants were being grown in the Grasse region of France to provide the growing perfume industry with raw materials. Even today, France remains the centre of the European perfume design and trade.

After Napoleon came to power, exorbitant expenditures for perfume continued. Two quarts of violet cologne were delivered to him each week, and he is said to have used sixty bottles of double extract of jasmine every month. Josephine had stronger perfume preferences. She was partial to musk, and she used so much that sixty years after her death the scent still lingered in her boudoir.

=== England ===
Perfume use peaked in England during the reigns of Henry VIII (reigned 1509–1547) and Queen Elizabeth I (reigned 1558–1603). All public places were scented during Queen Elizabeth's rule, since she could not tolerate bad smells. It was said that the sharpness of her nose was equaled only by the slyness of her tongue. Ladies of the day took great pride in creating delightful fragrances and they displayed their skill in mixing scents in the still rooms of manor houses.

As with industry and the arts, perfume underwent profound change in the 19th century. Changing tastes and the development of modern chemistry laid the foundations of modern perfumery as alchemy gave way to chemistry.

=== Russia ===
Perfume manufacture in Russia grew after 1861 and became globally significant by the early 20th century. The production of perfume in the Soviet Union became a part of the planned economy in the 1930s, although output was not high.

== Americas ==
In early America, the first scents were colognes and scented water by French explorers in New France. Florida water, an uncomplicated mixture of eau de cologne with a dash of oil of cloves, cassia and lemongrass, was popular.

== See also ==
- Scented water
