= René Bianchi =

René Bianchi may refer to:

- René Bianchi (cyclist) (1934–2026), French cyclist
- René Bianchi (perfumer) (died 1578), Italian perfumer
