= Joanna III of Navarre =

Joanna III of Navarre may refer to:

- Jeanne d'Albret (1528–1572), queen regnant of Navarre
- Joanna of Castile (1479–1555), Queen of Castile and Aragon
