= Nicolas-Marie Gatteaux =

French medal engraver

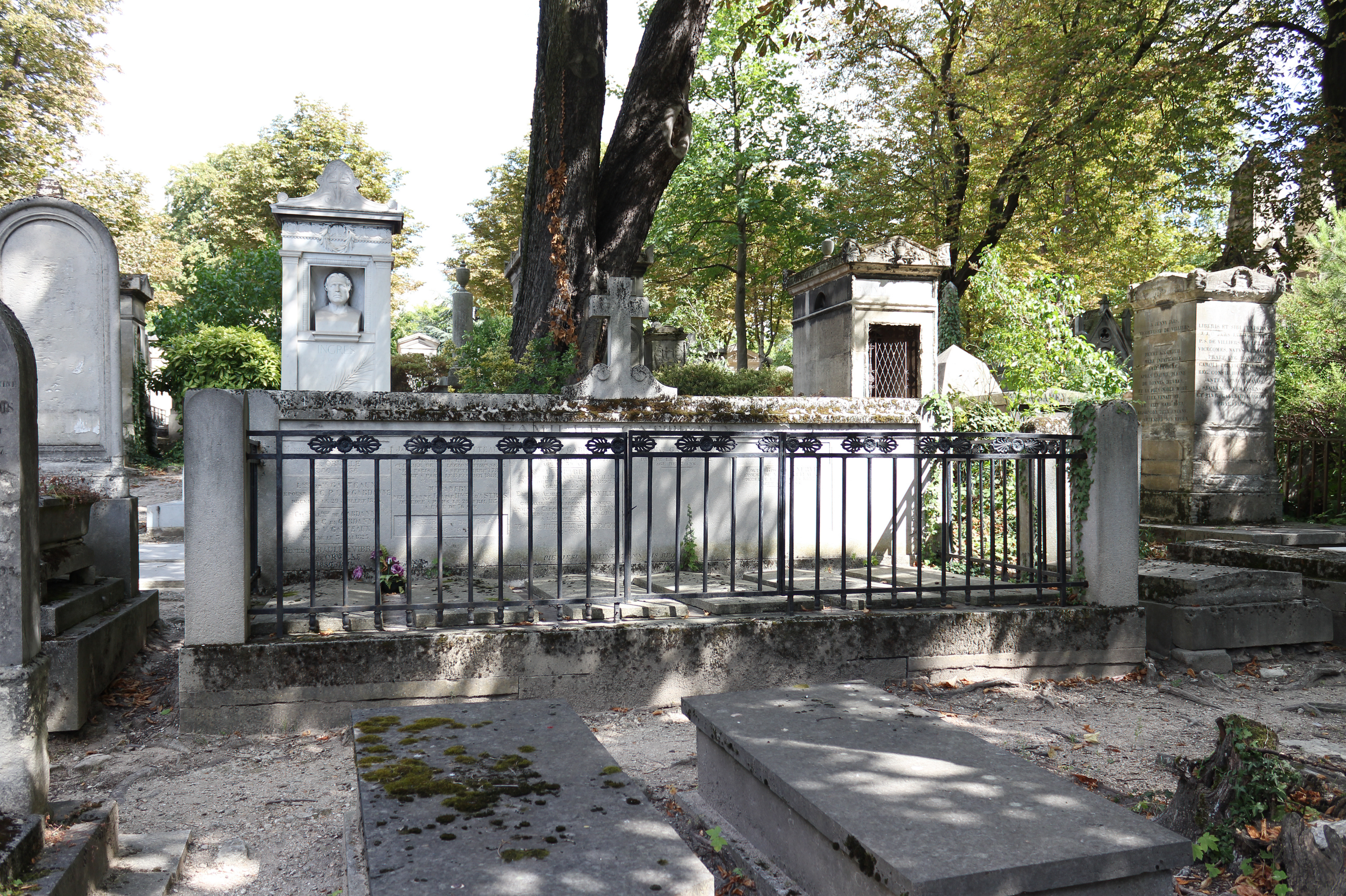
Tomb of Nicolas-Marie Gatteaux and Jacques-Édouard Gatteaux

Nicolas-Marie Gatteaux (2 August 1751, Paris - 24 June 1832, Paris) was a French medal engraver, also notable as the father of the sculptor and medallist Jacques-Édouard Gatteaux (1788–1881). In 1781 he was appointed graveur des médailles du Roi.

== Career ==
A student of Delorme and Gros, he designed a large number of medals, largely referring to public events, such as the death of Louis XV, the coronation of Louis XVI, the birth of the Dauphin, the invention of the hot air balloon by the Montgolfier brothers, the voyage of Lapeyrouse, the Federation of the Départements of France, the Abolition of Privileges, and Moreau's crossing of the Rhine in year VIII. Other medals designed by him shown notable figures such as Joseph Haydn, le comte de Maurepas, d'Alambert and the Three Consuls (including Bonaparte). He also designed assignats, lottery tickets and stamps.

Gatteaux is also credited as the inventor of the pointing machine, a tool used for copying sculpture.

Gatteaux is also well known as a playing card maker. In 1809, just after the French Revolution, Napoleon asked the famous French painter David to develop a new design of the Paris pattern. This deck was however not accepted. In 1811 Gatteaux adapted the design and it was produced until 1853. In 1813 Gatteaux made a new design which eventually became the new base Paris pattern This continued to be the standard Paris pattern until now. The only change that was made hereafter was that it became a design with double honour cards instead of single ones.
