= Jacques-Édouard Gatteaux =

French sculptor and medal engraver

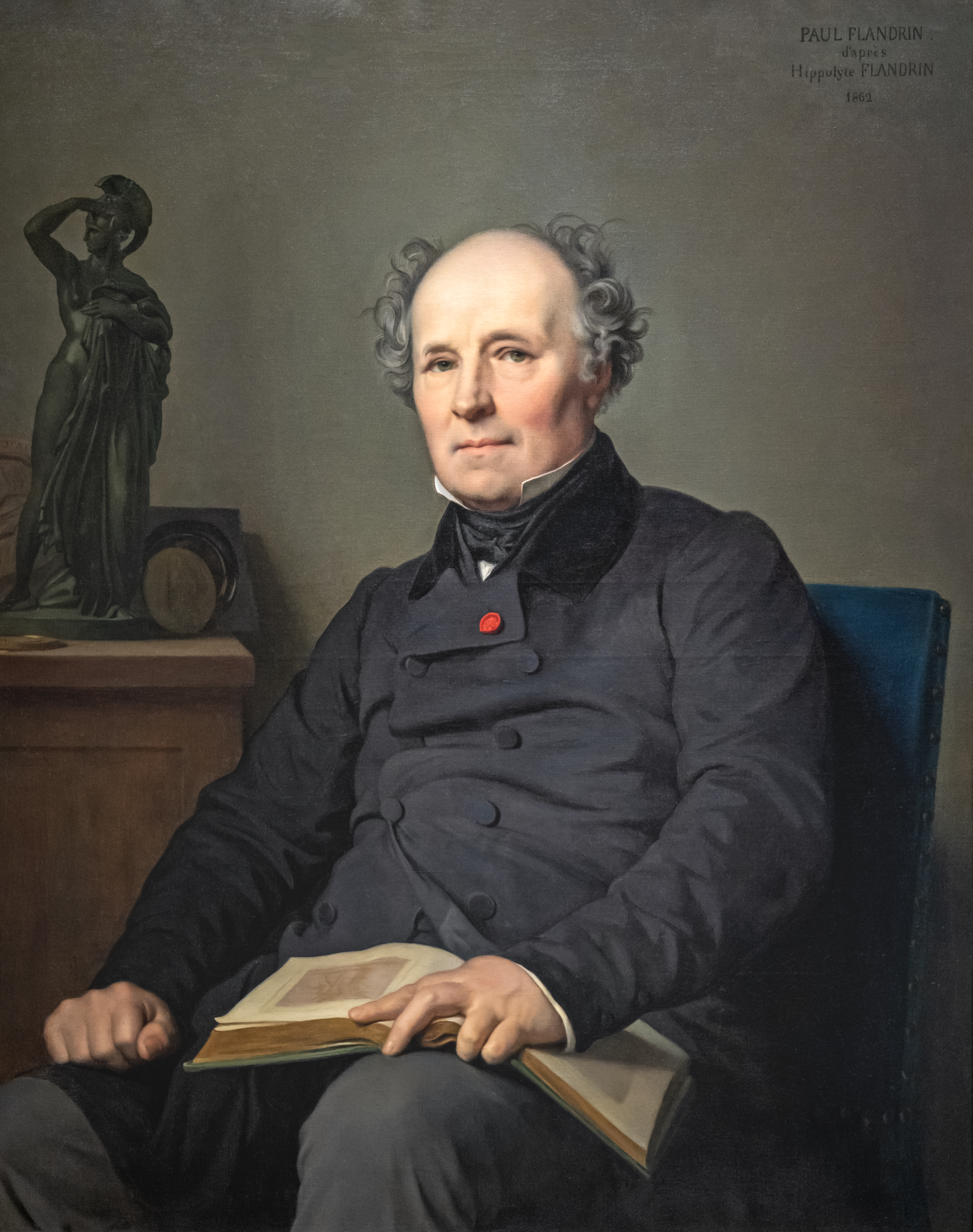
Portrait of Édouard Gatteaux by Paul Flandrin

Jacques-Édouard Gatteaux (4 November 1788 – 9 February 1881) was a French sculptor and medal engraver. Born in Paris, he studied under his father Nicolas-Marie Gatteaux (also a medal engraver) and Jean-Guillaume Moitte.

He won first prize in the prix de Rome in 1809 and was elected a member of the Académie des beaux-arts in 1845 and of the Institut de France. He also became an officer of the Légion d'honneur. He died in his home city.

== Works ==
Among his medals are examples showing Corneille, La Fontaine, Buffon, Malherbe, Rabelais, the coronation of Charles X and the arrival of Louis-Philippe. He designed marble busts of Rabelais and Michelangelo, as well as the statue of Anne de Beaujeu in the Reines de France et Femmes illustres series in the jardin du Luxembourg in Paris. In 2004, the musée du Louvre preempted a Sotheby's sale in Paris of a 74-cm high bronze statue of Minerva by him from 1843.

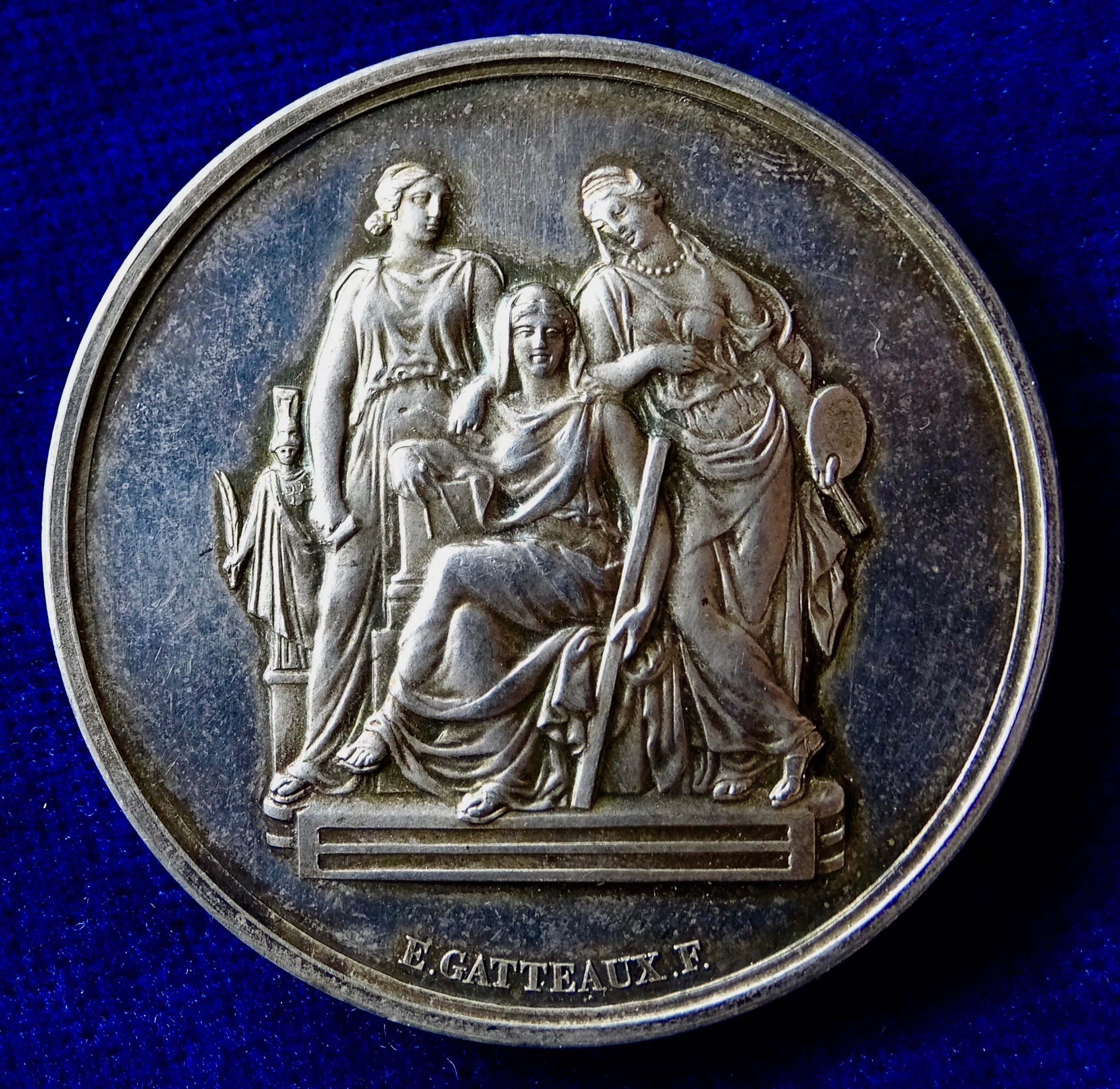
France, The Three Graces Silver Prize Medal 1833 (ND) by Eduard Gatteaux for the École nationale des Beaux-Arts, Paris, obverse

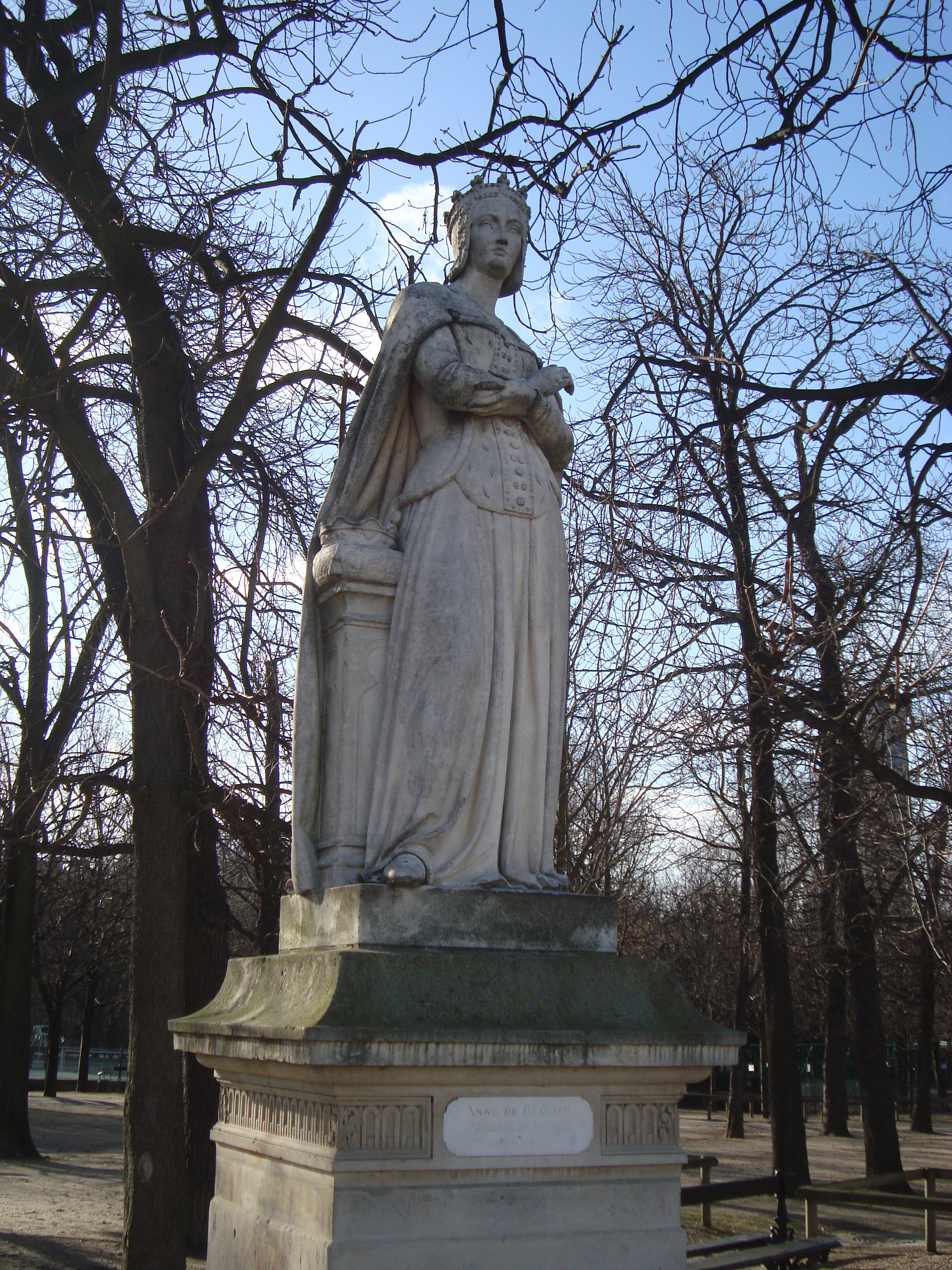
Statue of Anne de Beaujeu, from the Reines de France et Femmes illustres series in the jardin du Luxembourg.

== General sources ==
- Jacques-Édouard Gatteaux in American public collections, on the French Sculpture Census website
- E. Bénézit. Dictionnaire des peintres, sculpteurs, dessinateurs et graveurs. 1976. Volume 4, page 631.
