= Antide Janvier =

French clockmaker (1751–1835)

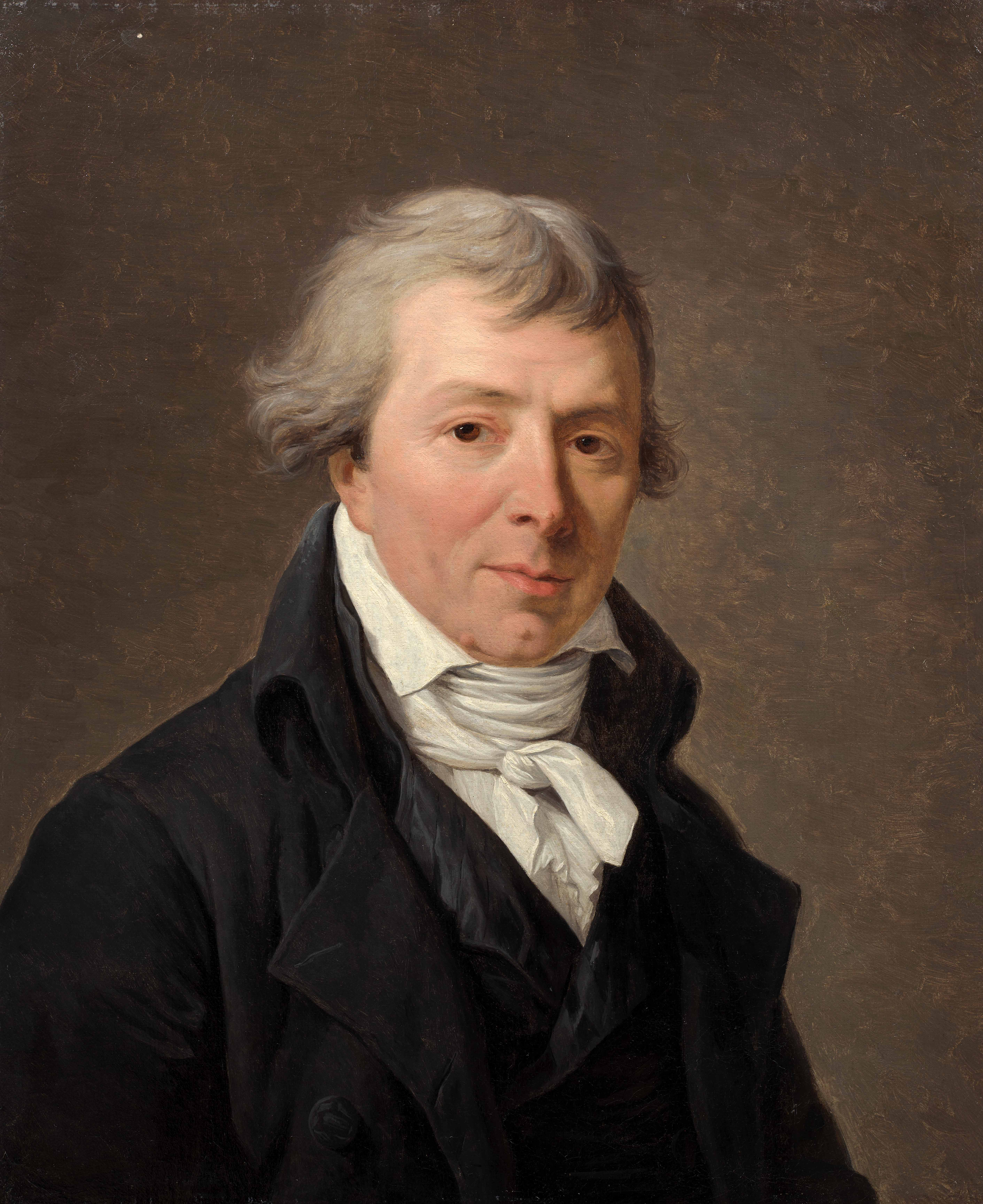
Portrait of Antide Janvier by Marie-Gabrielle Capet, cica 1795-1799

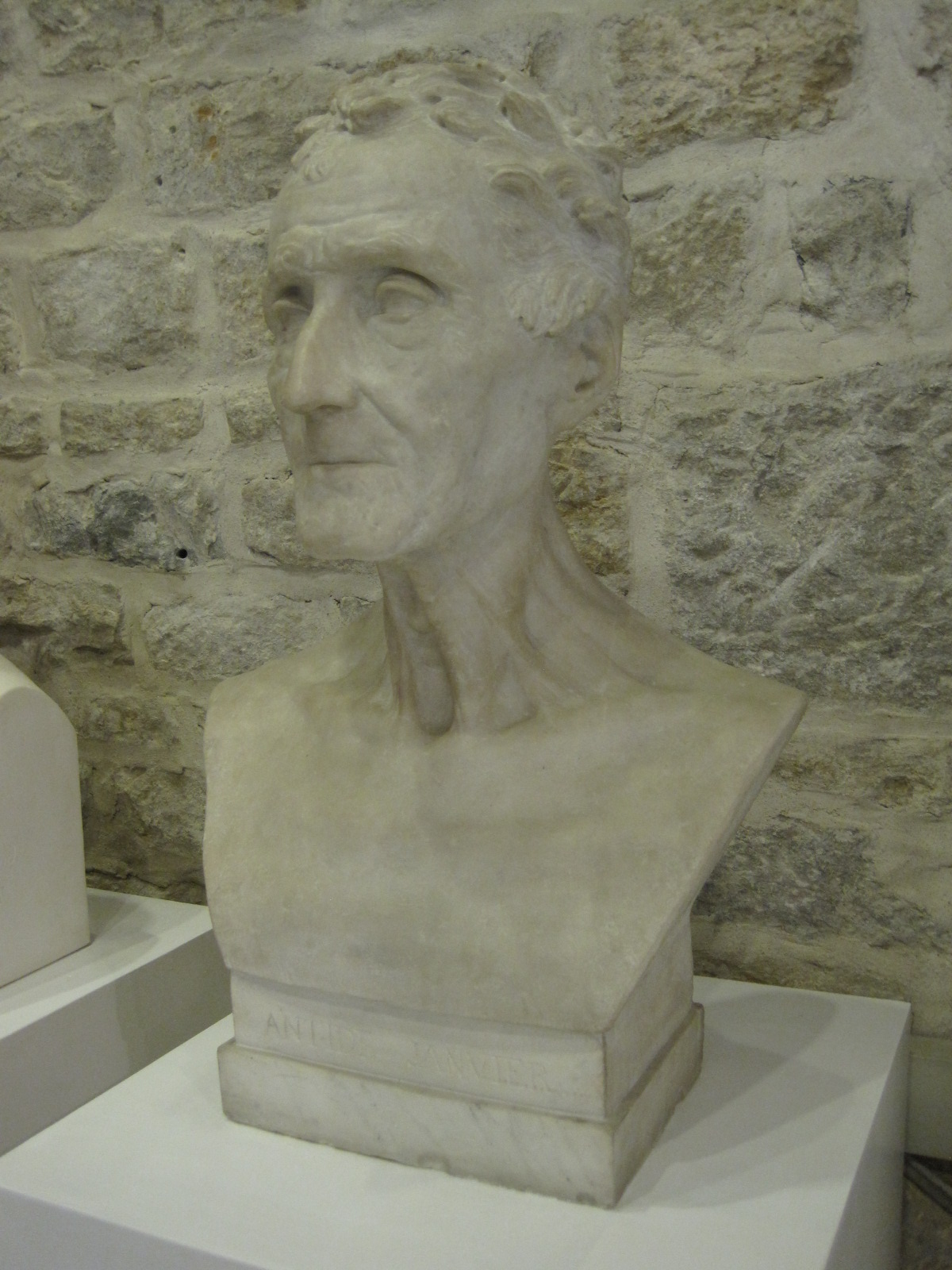
Posthumous bust (1836) by Victor Huguenin

Antide Janvier (1 July 1751 – 23 September 1835) was a French clockmaker.

== Life ==
Antide Janvier was born in a village in the Jura, and learned the basics of his trade from his father, and was educated in Latin, Greek, mathematics and astronomy by a local abbé. At age 15 he built an astronomical sphere which he presented to the Academy of Sciences of Besançon, which won him wide admiration, and he began his career as an apprentice watchmaker.

He gained a reputation as a maker of ingenious and complicated clocks, including many astronomical clocks and clocks showing the tides. He was also famous for his "double pendulum clocks", also called "resonance clocks", which he was the first to make. He eventually became Louis XVI's royal clockmaker. After the French Revolution he spent time in prison because of this royal association and then fell on hard times; his hardships were increased by the death of his wife in 1792. He sold his watches and equipment and designs to Abraham-Louis Breguet, who sold watches under his own name. Following the restoration of the monarchy under Charles X, he was awarded a small pension beginning in 1826, but died in poverty and obscurity.

== Works ==
He authored and published an important textbook on the theory and practice of watchmaking: "Manuel Chronométrique ou précis de ce qui concerne le temps, ses divisions, ses mesures, leurs usages", Published 1821 by Didot, Paris (267 pages, Frontispiece and 5 engraved foldout plates).

Janvier also produced a written account of twelve of his very original timekeepers, which was published 1827 under the title "Recueil des Machines composées et exécutées par Antide Janvier", which has been reissued 1995 in facsimile format by publisher L'image du Temps (56 pages).

The largest publicly-accessible collection of Janvier's masterworks is in the Musée Paul Dupuy in Toulouse.

== Books ==
- Hayard, Michel (1995). Antide Janvier, Celestial clockmaker.
- Hayard, Michel (2010). Antide Janvier, Celestial clockmaker – Second edition completed and enlarged.
- Buffard, François (2025). Antide Janvier horloger du roi. ISBN 978-2-9536444-6-3.
