= Victor Huguenin =

French sculptor

- Born: 21 February 1802; Dole, Jura, France
- Died: 8 January 1860 (aged 57); Paris, France
- Occupation: Sculptor

Jean Pierre Victor Huguenin (21 February 1802 – 8 January 1860) was a French sculptor.

== Career ==
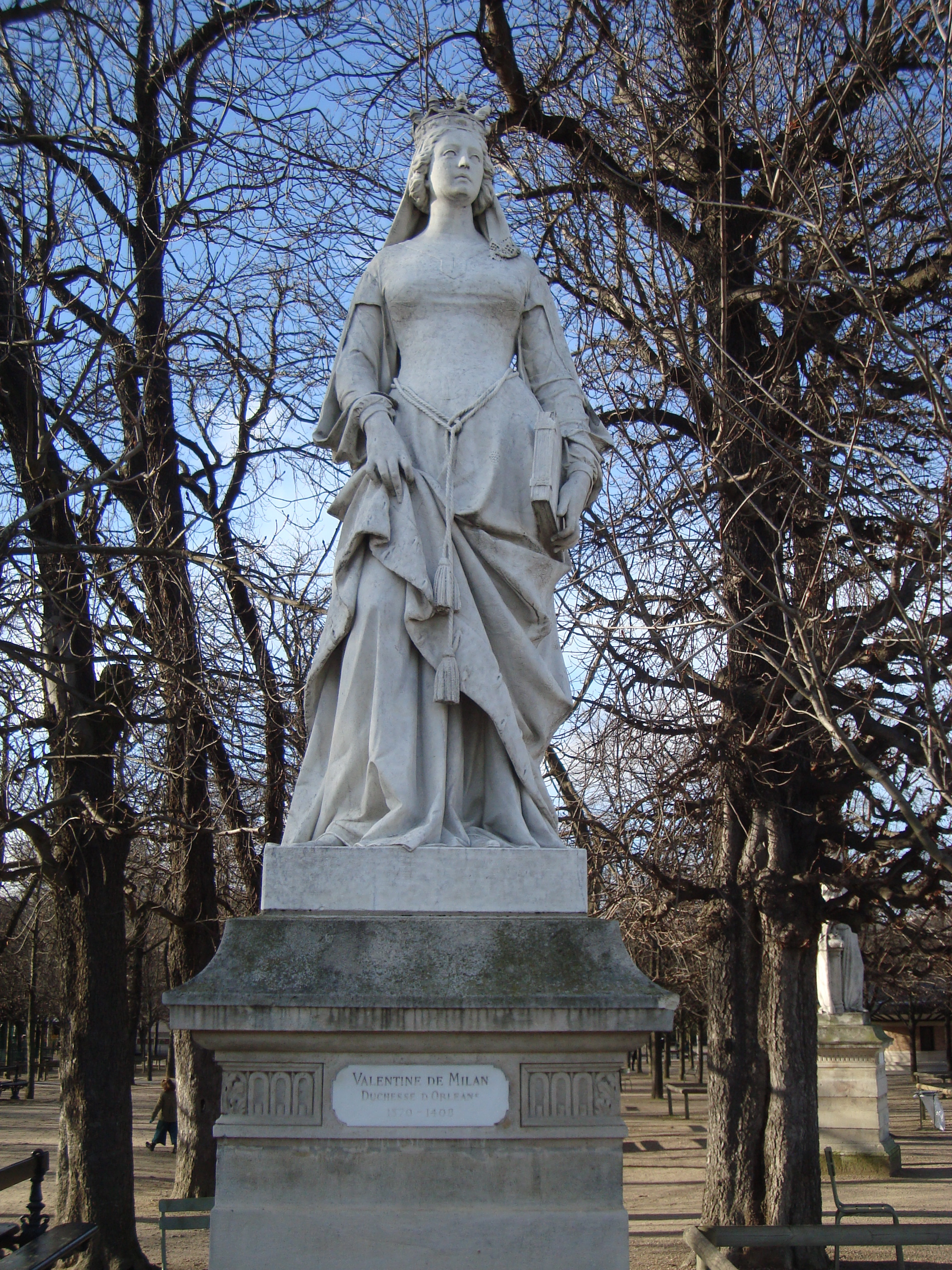
Valentina Visconti, Duchess of Orléans (1846)

Jean Pierre Victor Huguenin was born in Dole, Jura, on 21 February 1802. His father was a musician. Victor Huguenin studied under Jules Ramey at the École des Beaux-Arts in Paris. After teaching at Besançon, he returned to Paris. He exhibited in various exhibitions and received orders from Louis Philippe I for the Museum of the History of France, Versailles, the Jardin du Luxembourg and the courtyard of the Louvre Palace.

Around 1836 Huguenin created a sculpture of Charles VI of France and his mistress Odette de Champdivers. A relatively small work, it was designed to be sold to a rich art-lover who could place it on a table in a salon, or in a cabinet. It was exhibited in the Salon of 1839, and was praised for its composition and its realism.

He undertook a marble statue of Valentina Visconti, Duchess of Orléans (1370-1408), Duchess of Orléans, to an order of 16 January 1843 from the Minister of the Interior. It was exhibited in the Salon of 1846, and is part of the series Queens of France and famous women in the Jardin du Luxembourg. In the late 1850s Huguenin undertook the decoration of the Villa Eugénie, the Biarritz summer home of Napoleon III and the Empress Eugenie, with Corinthian columns and reliefs of arms and crowned eagles.

Victor Huguenin died on 8 January 1860 in Paris. A bronze statue of Pasquale Paoli by Huguenin was erected in 1864 the center of the Place Paoli in Corte, Corsica.

== Works ==
- Prometheus devoured by the Vulture (1825)
- Prometheus tied to a rock
- Charles VI and Odette de Champdivers (1839)
- Virgin and Child in the church of Notre-Dame de Dole
- Chaste Suzanne and Fainting of Psyche (1859)
- Valentine of Milan (1868) in the series Queens of France and famous women of the Jardin du Luxembourg
- General Bonaparte in the Italian campaign, "Milan 1796", gilt bronze medallion

== Gallery ==
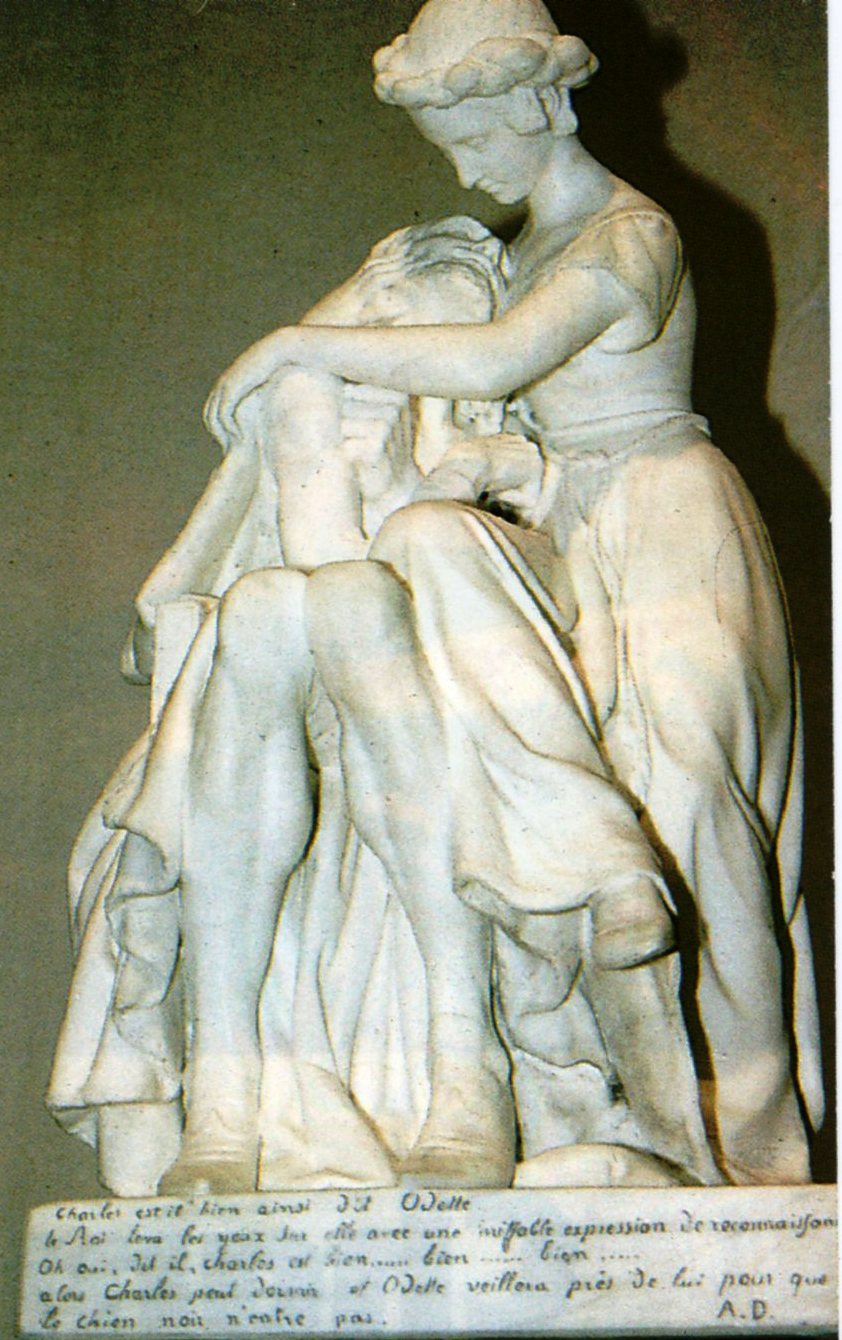
Charles VI and Odette de Champdivers, the Museum of Fine Arts, Dole (1839)

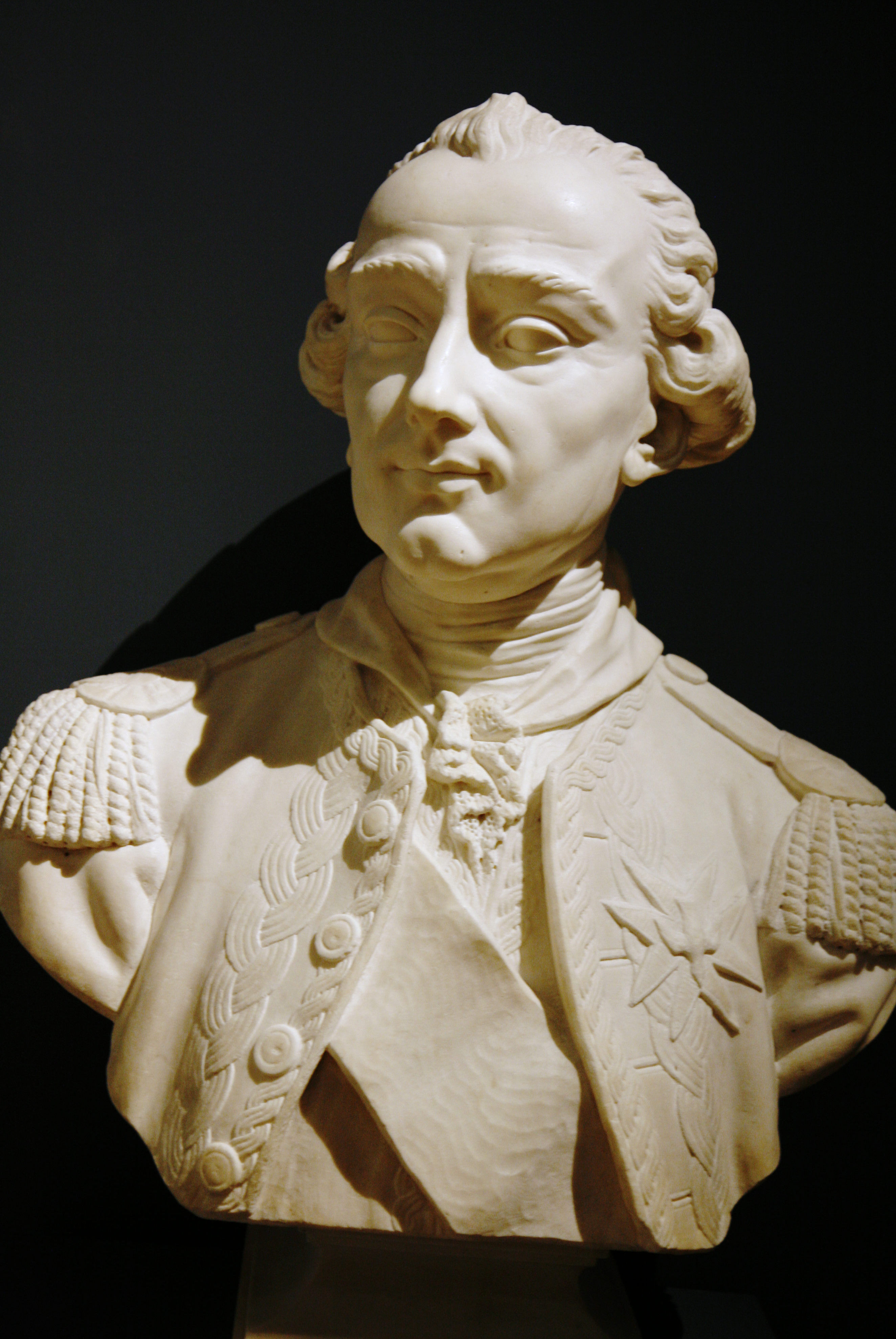
Bust of Charles Hector, comte d'Estaing

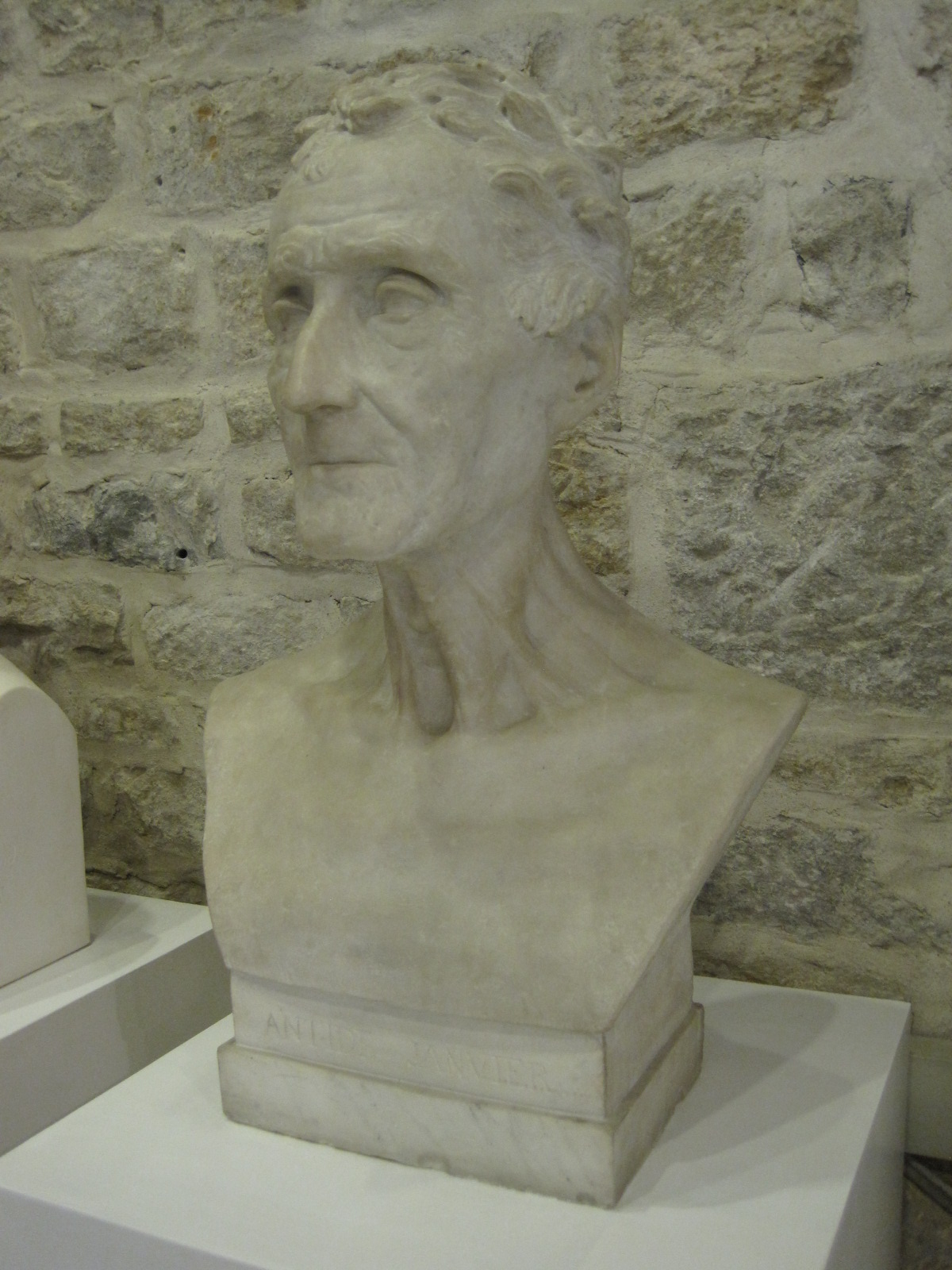
Bust of Antide Janvier (1836)

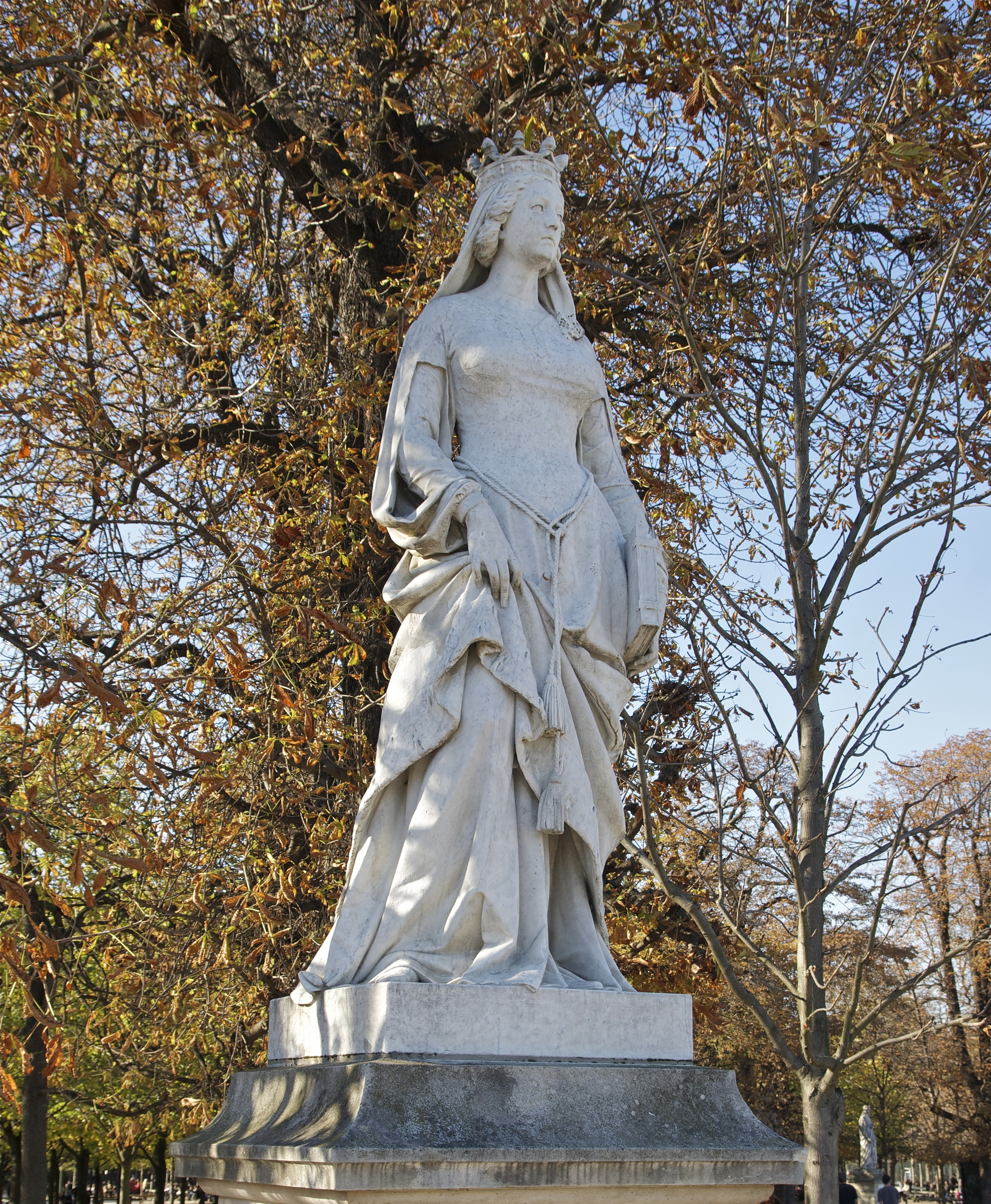
Valentine Visconti of Milan, Jardin du Luxembourg (1868)
