= Perfumed gloves =

Type of handwear

Perfumed gloves, also referred to as sweet gloves, are perfumed gloves, often embroidered, introduced to England from Spain and Venice. They were popular as gifts in the 16th and 17th-centuries. Stories describe them as a conveyance of poison for Jeanne d'Albret, Gabrielle d'Estrees, and Gilbert Talbot, 7th Earl of Shrewsbury.

== Practice of perfuming ==
Perfuming gloves was practiced in Spain, and forty valuable pairs were offered as a prize at a 16th-century jousting match. The leather was immersed several times in wine mixed with waters of lily, of roses, orange flowers, cloves, citron, storax, civet, and ambergris. In England, the permanently scented leather was called "washed", perfumed gloves were sometimes called "sweet gloves". Perfuming enhanced the value of the gloves and also masked any residual odours remaining in the leather from the tanning process. The fabric linings of gloves could also be perfumed. In September 1590, scented Spanish taffeta was bought to line three pairs of gloves for James VI and I.

Antoine of Navarre and Jeanne d'Albret employed Gassiot de Serres to perfume their gloves. In 1562, the English ambassador in Paris, Nicholas Throckmorton, wrote to the ambassador in Spain, Thomas Chaloner, asking him to send gloves perfumed with orange flowers and jasmine for himself and his wife. After Mary, Queen of Scots escaped from Lochleven Castle, pairs of perfumed gloves were sent to her in England from her wardrobe in Holyrood Palace, wrapped in goatskin.

Gloves for Princess Mary were perfumed by Cuthbert Blackeden, an apothecary who worked for Henry VIII. Angelo Marie, a perfumer working for Mary, Queen of Scots, added velvet linings to Lord Darnley's gloves. Gloves for Elizabeth I were made or mended by John Wynyard, a page of the wardrobe of beds. He was issued with shears for cutting leather and was in charge of a perfuming pan.

Prince Henry had perfumed gloves made of stag's leather and leather from Córdoba. In 1599, the Earl of Rutland bought "washed" gloves in France, and bought perfuming materials for gloves from a London goldsmith, including pots of cotignac or marmalade of "plums with amber".

Perfuming could be a domestic activity among the English elite. Elinor Fettiplace included methods for washing and perfuming leather with rosewater and fumes of benjamin and perfuming leather gloves in her 1604 recipe book.

== Amber gloves ==
Amber gloves were perfumed with "grey amber" or ambergris, produced by sperm whales. This was an expensive material, and substitute scents were made from mixes of musk, civet, gum tragacanth and other ingredients. During the election of the Pope in January 1550, the Cardinals placed bets on the outcome, wagering valuable amber gloves, which were "essential" costume in Rome according to the Venetian ambassador. The Spanish ambassador, the Marquis of Hinojosa, brought 200 pairs of amber gloves to distribute as diplomatic gifts at the English court in 1624.

In October 1611, the English diplomat John Digby reported a rumour that the strong scent of amber gloves worn by Philip III of Spain had accidentally led to the death of the Margaret of Austria, Queen of Spain in childbirth.

== Perfumed gloves as gifts ==
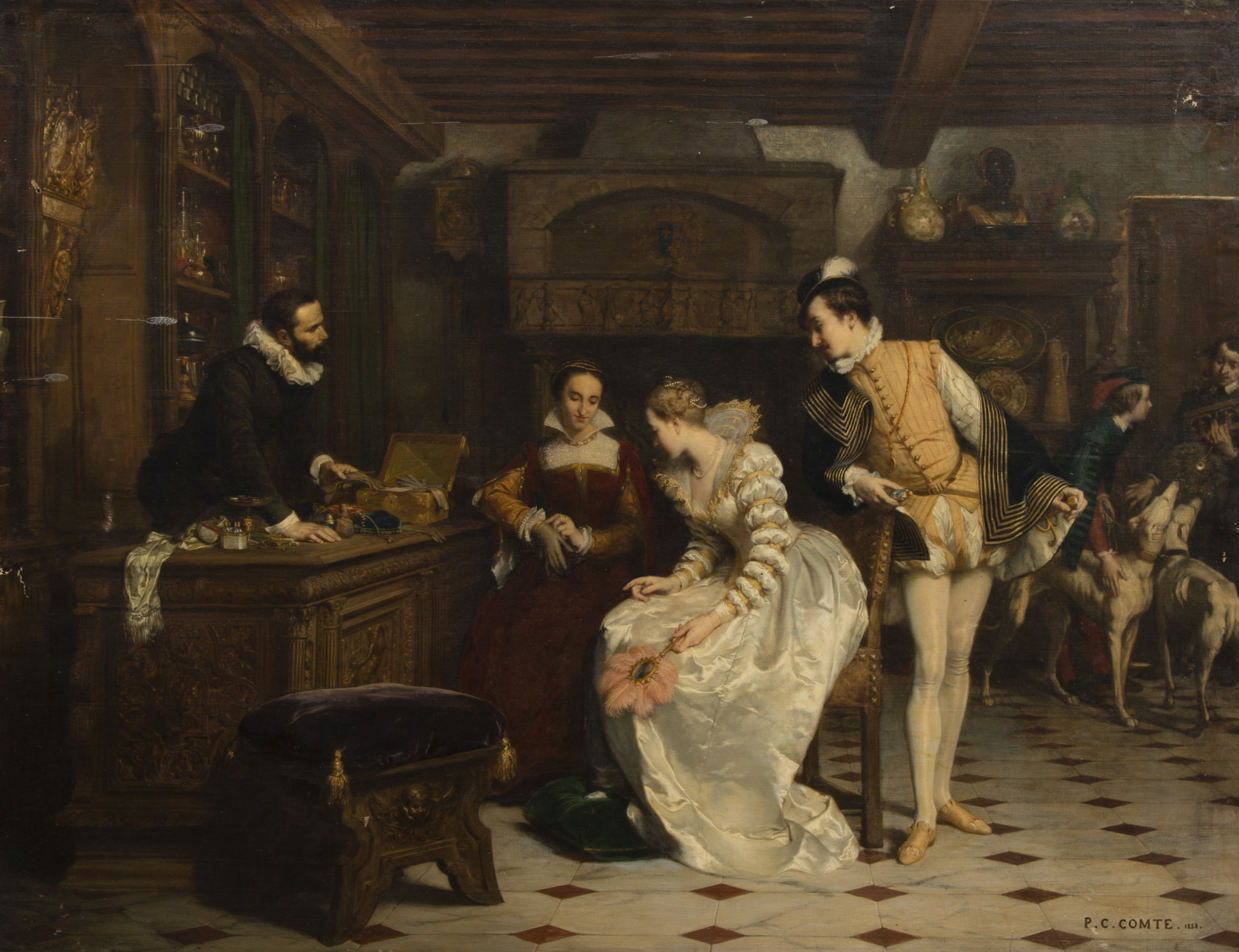
Jeanne III of Navarre buying poisoned gloves from Catherine de Medici's parfumeur, René, history painting by Pierre-Charles Comte.

Catherine de Medici (1519-1589) gave gloves to her daughter Elisabeth of Valois (1545-1568), wife of Philip II of Spain. Isabella D'Este (1474-1539) made her own scents and gave gloves to Claude of France (1499-1524). Perfumed gloves were often given as presents and New Year's Day gifts by aristocrats and courtiers in Tudor and Stuart England.

Elizabeth Neville, a daughter of John Neville of Chevet, had a pair of perfumed gloves costing £3-4s in her wedding apparel in 1526. Archangelo Arcano, one of Henry VIII's gunners and military engineers gave the king perfumed gloves, and Princess Mary was given perfumed gloves.

=== Elizabeth I and perfumed gloves ===
There were fears that gloves could be poisoned, and William Cecil wrote a memorandum for the safety of Elizabeth I, advising caution with gifts of perfumed clothing; "Item, that no manner of perfume, either in apparel or sleeves, gloves, or such like, or otherwise shall be appointed for your majesty's savour, be presented by any stranger".

Some of Elizabeth's gloves were made by John Wynyard, a page of the royal wardrobe. His equipment in 1564 included a perfuming pan made of steel. In 1562, John Dymocke, a jewellery merchant with English court connections visited Eric XIV of Sweden, bringing a gift of perfumed black velvet gloves.

According to Edmund Howes, when Edward de Vere, 17th Earl of Oxford returned from Italy in 1576, he brought "gloves, sweet bagges, a perfumed leather jerkin, and other pleasant things". Elizabeth was pleased with the scent of the gloves and thereafter it was known as the "Earle of Oxford's perfume". Although the story is of the period, and later widely popularised by Isaac Disraeli and others, perfume by that name does not seem to have been much used by Elizabethans.

Elizabeth sniffed gloves presented to her at Audley End in July 1578, and put them "half way upon her hands". Around this time, an Italian perfumer of gloves, Guillam Bisco, settled in London's Queenhithe Ward, and in 1583, "Frances Lewcattelly" (Lucatelli) a perfumer of gloves from Venice, who had been given permission to work in London as early as 1569, lived in Blackfriars.

Elizabeth received 23 pairs of perfumed gloves at New Year in 1603. Lady Walsingham gave Elizabeth I scented gloves with cuffs embroidered with seed pearl in January 1589. Court musicians of the Lupo and Bassano families gave Elizabeth I perfumed gloves as New Year's Day gifts in 1599/1600. Lady Anne Clifford gave Spanish leather gloves to Mary Sackville, the wife of Sir Henry Neville in December 1617.

=== Jacobean diplomacy ===
Perfumed gloves were frequently given as gifts by diplomats. In September 1603 the Spanish ambassador to England, the Count of Villamediana, brought a "great store of Spanish gloves, Hawks' hoods, leather for jerkins, and moreover a perfumer". In November Villamediana invited the Duke of Lennox and the Earl of Mar to dinner. According to Arbella Stuart, he asked them "to bring the Scottish ladies for he was desirous to see some natural beauties". The women from the Queen's household who accepted this invitation included Jane Drummond, the young Anna Hay, and Lady Carey. The ambassador gave Lady Carey a present of Spanish leather gloves at the dinner, and afterwards sent a gold necklace. These were diplomatic gifts intended to leverage support for Spanish policy at court.

The Earl of Nottingham was involved in the negotiations with Spain known as the Somerset House Conference and the subsequent ratification of the treaty at Valladolid. The King of Spain, Philip III gave him jewels and gilt plate. Gifts for his wife, Margaret Howard, Countess of Nottingham, included perfumed gloves and other perfumed goods.
