= Pointing machine =

Sculpting tool

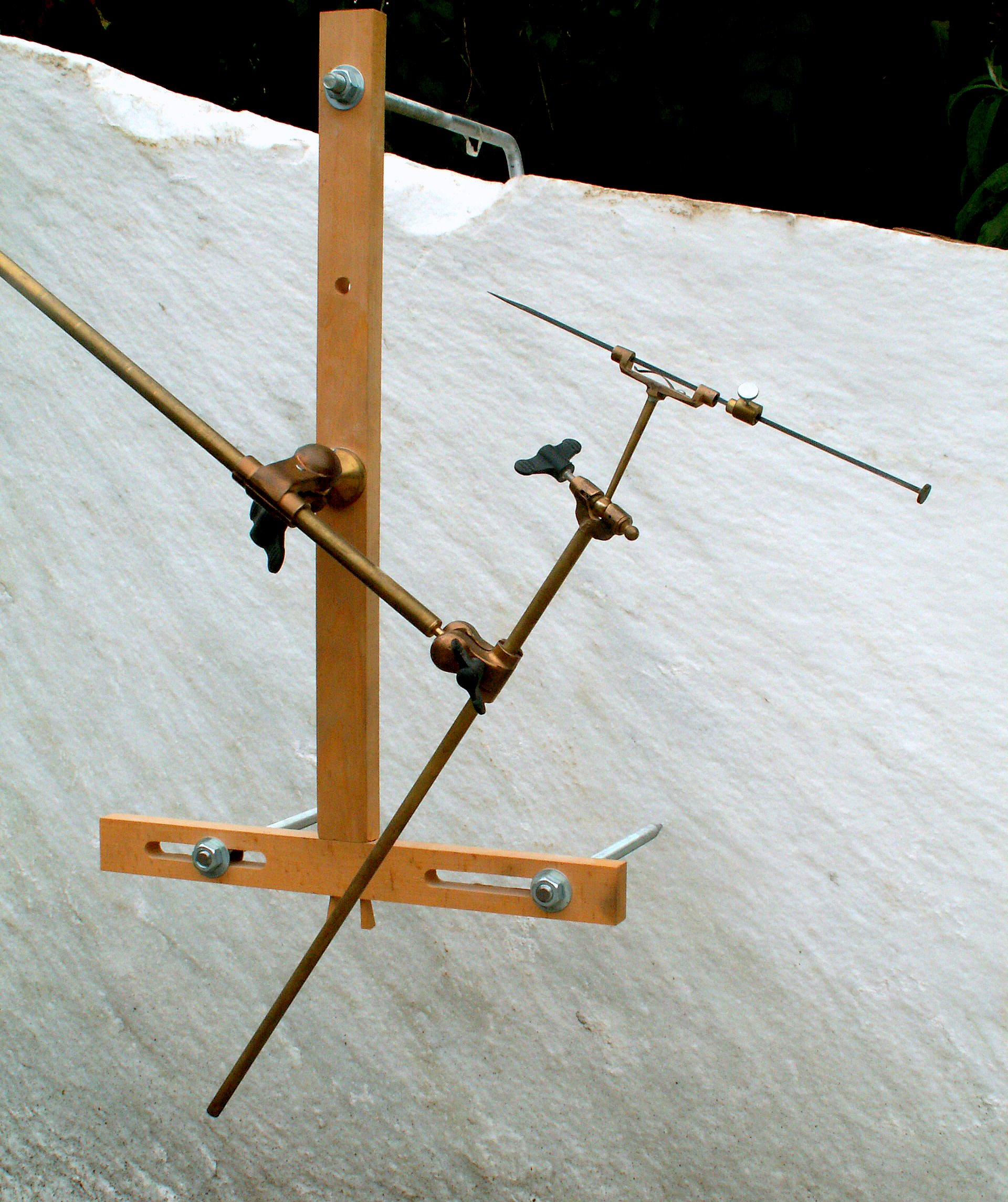
A pointing 'machine' and its crosswood

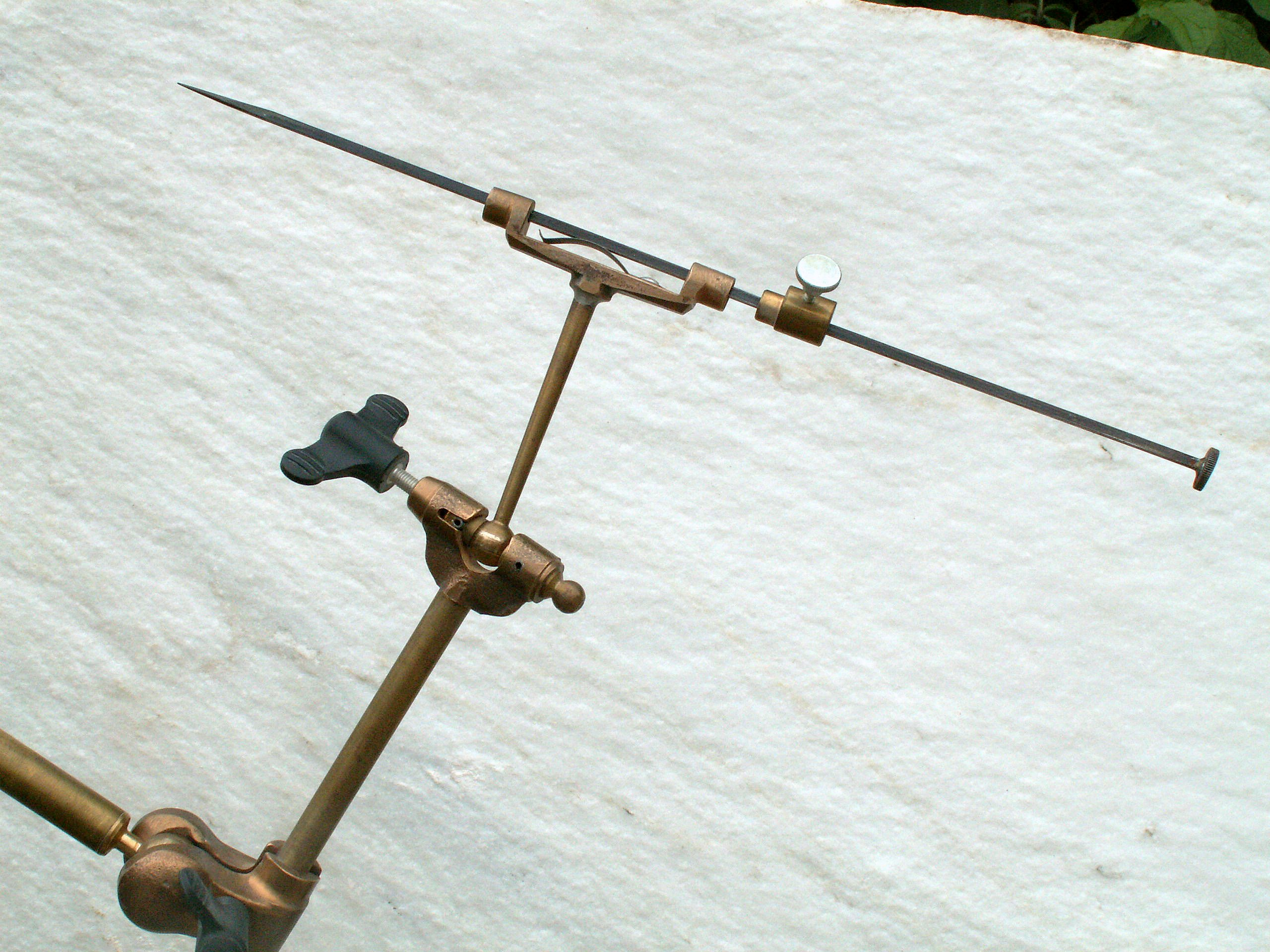
The pointing needle and stop

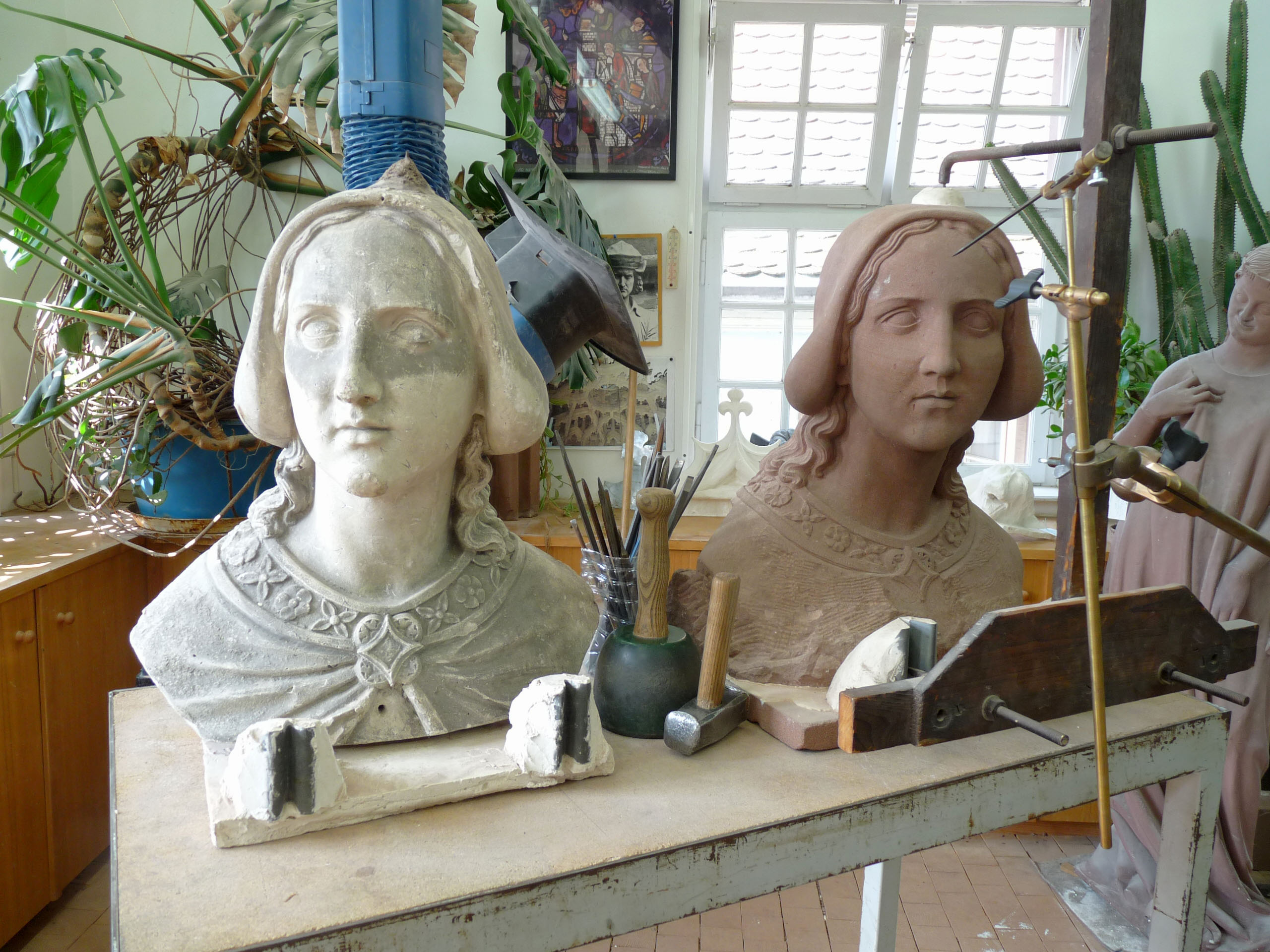
Copying a plaster cast of a bust in red sandstone. Workshop of the Strasbourg cathedral

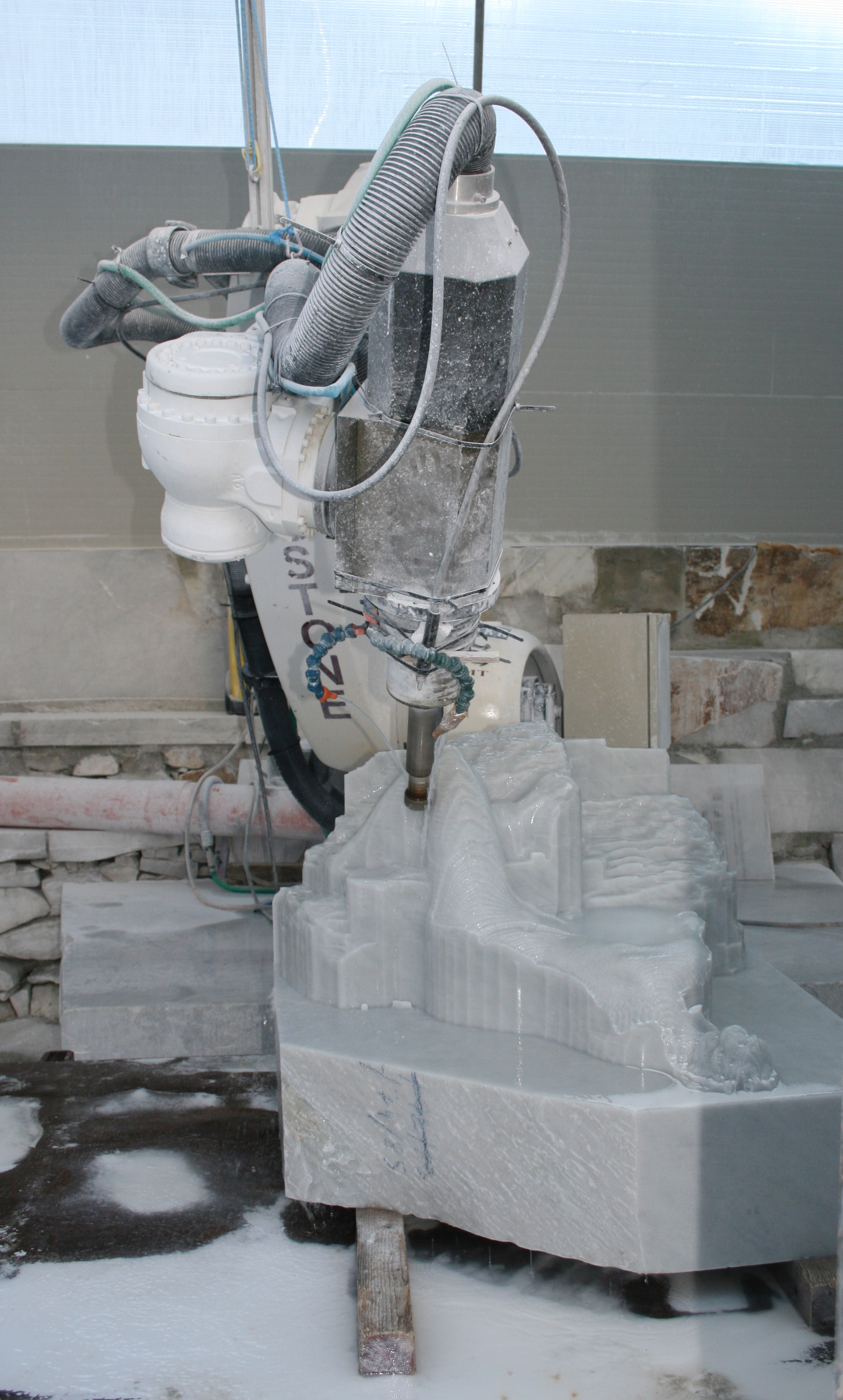
A computer controlled router carving a sculpture from a block of marble

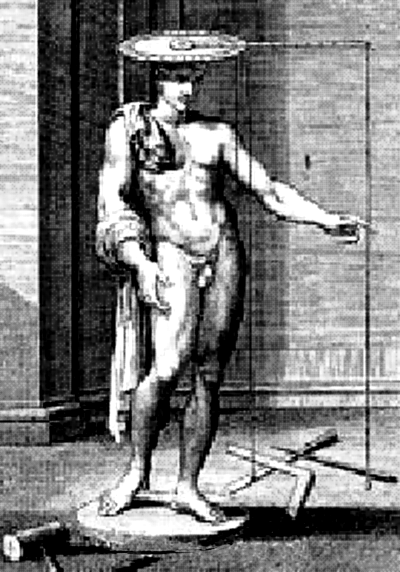
15th Century measuring device with plumb-bobs

A pointing machine is a measuring tool used by stone sculptors and woodcarvers to accurately copy plaster, clay or wax sculpture models into wood or stone. In essence the device is a pointing needle that can be set to any position and then fixed. It further consists of brass or stainless steel rods and joints which can be placed into any position and then tightened. It is not actually a machine; its name is derived from the Italian macchinetta di punta. The invention of the tool has been ascribed to both the French sculptor and medallist Nicolas-Marie Gatteaux (1751–1832) and to the British sculptor John Bacon (1740–1799). It was later perfected by Canova. However, similar devices were used in ancient times, when the copying of Greek sculptures for the Roman market was a large industry.

== Use ==
The pointing machine is used for making one-to-one copies of existing sculptures and to reproduce models made of plaster, modeling clay or modeling wax in materials like stone or wood. It is not possible to use a pointing machine to produce enlarged or reduced copies; the traditional instruments for this are a set of calipers or a three-dimensional version of the pantograph. However, there is also a special version of the pointing machine that was used for mirroring, enlargements or reduced carving.

To better control the result of the finished sculpture, sculptors have increasingly taken to making a detailed model and then reproducing it, on the same scale or enlarged, in stone. Particularly in the 19th century, sculptors would follow a specific procedure: first a wax or clay model was made, of which a plaster cast was taken, which in its turn served as the model to be copied in stone with the use of calipers or a pointing machine. This is called the indirect method of carving.

The advantages of this method are that the result is very controllable and that the chance of making irreparable mistakes is reduced drastically. In addition, the process is much faster when carving difficult sculptures, because the search for the right shape is done during the modelling process instead of during the carving itself, thus making it much easier to adjust it or make changes. Finally, using this method, much or all of the work can be done by assistant sculptors, increasing productivity. The disadvantages of using the pointing machine are a great loss of directness and the risk of loss of expression.

Famous sculptors increasingly tended to use assistants. Sometimes a sculptor would run a large workshop with dozens of assistants and pupils. Art academies were formed where the skills of sculpture were taught in detail. The consequence of this development was the generation of 'academy art', from which some sculptors wanted to distance themselves. Sculptors eventually returned to more direct forms of expression, by means of for example the 'direct carving method', impressionism and expressionism. This was sometimes influenced by the indigenous art of Africa and Oceania, which brought about a shock because of its directness and raw expression. The pointing machine's popularity waned as a result, reflecting the diminishing knowledge and skills of carving in wood and stone during the 20th century.

== Technique ==
To transfer measuring points from a model to a block of stone or wood, the sculptor usually takes three reference points on both model and block. By using these points a sculpture can be measured accurately, for the three directions of measuring – width, height and depth – are thus defined. These three measuring points are traditionally used by sculptors to copy a sculpture with calipers, but this was simplified significantly with the invention of the pointing machine.

In using the pointing machine, the sculptor mounts or glues three metal rivets, that correspond to each other, on both model and block of stone or wood. To these basic points, a (usually wooden) T-shaped support is hooked up, the cross. On this crosswood, the actual pointing device is attached. The sculptor sets the device by moving the arms of the tool so that the point of the needle just touches the point to be measured on the model (for instance, the nose of a bust). The needle is set at a right angle to the surface that is measured and the stop is tightened. The sculptor then takes the whole cross, pointing machine and all, to the block of stone or wood and sets it up on the identical, corresponding basic points. The needle that defines the measuring point can slide. By subsequently carving or drilling carefully until the needle touches the stop, the sculptor can place their measuring point exactly in the block. By thus copying several dozens or hundreds of points, an accurate copy can be carved. The quality of the copy will still depend on the skill of the sculptor, however, because these points are only the basis for the final sculpture.

The real advantage is the need to measure each point only once, instead of three times with callipers (once each for height, width and depth). Also there is no need to read scales in inches or centimetres, and consequently there is less room for error.

Usually, the sculptor will make their own crosswood for the statue, as a small statue needs a much smaller crosswood than a life-size statue does.

== History and future ==
Before the invention of the pointing machine by Gatteaux, sculptors used several methods to measure and copy sculpture, such as grids, which were already in use in early Egyptian sculpture, plumb-bobs, measuring sticks and calipers. The main technique was to measure the model from three fixed points with calipers.

Nowadays laser pointing machines are available. These have the advantages that the needle does not hinder carving and that the sculptor is given an audible warning when the right depth is reached.

The latest developments are computer guided router systems that scan a model and can reproduce it in a variety of materials and in any desired size.
