= Reines de France et Femmes illustres =

Series of sculptures in Paris, France

The Queens of France and Famous Women (Reines de France et Femmes illustres) is a group of sculptures in the Jardin du Luxembourg in Paris. It consists of 20 marble sculptures arranged around a large pond in front of the Palais du Luxembourg. Louis-Philippe I chose the women to be portrayed and most of the sculptures were commissioned around 1843, for around 12,000 francs each, and generally exhibited in the Paris Salons of 1847 or 1848.

The series originally included an 1852 statue of Joan of Arc by François Rude, which was moved to the Louvre in 1872 because it was considered too fragile to remain outdoors. The French government commissioned a substitute of Margaret of Anjou for 7,000 francs from Taluet, who completed it in 1877. It was exhibited at the 1895 Salon.

Clockwise starting at the northeast, the figures are:

Disposition

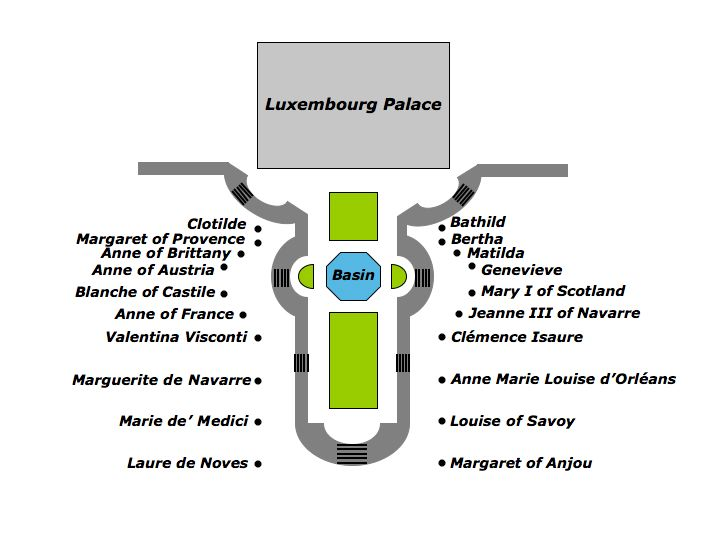
nothumb

Name	Image	inscription	Sculptor
Saint Balthild (c.630-680); Regent of France			Victor Thérasse; 1848
Bertrada (720-783) queen of France			Eugène Oudiné; 1848
Matilda (c.1031-1083); Duchess of Normandy			Jean-Jacques Elshoecht; 1848
Saint Genevieve (423-512); Patron saint of Paris			Michel-Louis Victor Mercier; 1845
Mary Stuart (1542–1587) queen of France			Jean-Jacques Feuchère; 1846
Jeanne d'Albret (1528–1572); Queen of Navarre			Jean-Louis Brian; 1848
Clémence Isaure			Antoine-Augustin Préault; 1848
Anne Marie Louise d'Orléans (1627–1693); Duchesse de Montpensier			Camille Demesmay; 1848
Louise of Savoy (1476–1531); Regent of France			Auguste Clésinger; 1851
Margaret of Anjou (1429–1482); Queen of England with her son Edward			Ferdinand Taluet; 1877
Laure de Noves (1307–1348)			Auguste Ottin; 1848
Marie de Médicis (1573–1642) queen of France			Louis-Denis Caillouette; 1847
Marguerite d'Angoulême (1492–1549); Queen of Navarre			Joseph-Stanislas Lescorné; 1848
Valentina of Milan (1370–1408); Duchess of Orléans			Victor Huguenin; 1846
Anne of France (1460–1522); Regent of France			Jacques-Édouard Gatteaux; 1847
Blanche of Castile (1188–1252) queen of France			Auguste Dumont; 1848
Anne of Austria (1601–1666) queen of France			Joseph-Marius Ramus; 1847
Anne of Brittany (1477–1514) queen of France			Jean-Baptiste Joseph Debay; 1846
Margaret of Provence (1219–1295) queen of France			Honoré Husson; 1847
Saint Clotilde (465-545) queen of France			Jean-Baptiste-Jules Klagmann; 1847
