= Balanos oil =

Semidrying oil pressed from the seeds of Balanites aegyptiaca

Balanos oil is a semidrying oil pressed from the seeds of Balanites aegyptiaca; it was used in Ancient Egypt as the base for perfumes.

The fact that perfumes are absorbed and retained by oils and fats was known in Egypt, Africa, China and India at an early date, and later to the Greeks, Koreans, Japanese and Romans; it was the basis of perfume-making in the ancient world, and it is still the principle of one of the modern methods employed when dealing with certain delicate flower-perfumes. Balanos oil, which is obtained from the seeds of Balanitesa egyptiaca, a tree that at one time grew plentifully in Egypt and is still abundant in the Sudan (where it is called heglig), is a bland odourless oil that does not readily become rancid and is hence very suitable for making perfumes. If balanos oil is warmed with myrrh, the volatile oil of the myrrh is absorbed by the fixed (non-volatile) balanos oil, which in consequence becomes perfumed, and when the extraction is finished, the perfumed balanos oil can be separated from the exhausted and useless residue by pressing.

The fatty acid composition of balanos oil is:

Fatty acid	Percentage
Palmitic	12-17%
Stearic	8-12%
Oleic	23-34%
Linoleic	37-55%

== Literary references ==
Balanos oil is mentioned in Lynds S. Robinson's 2003 novel Slayer of Gods.
