= Jeanne d'Albret =

Queen of Navarre from 1555 to 1572

Jeanne III
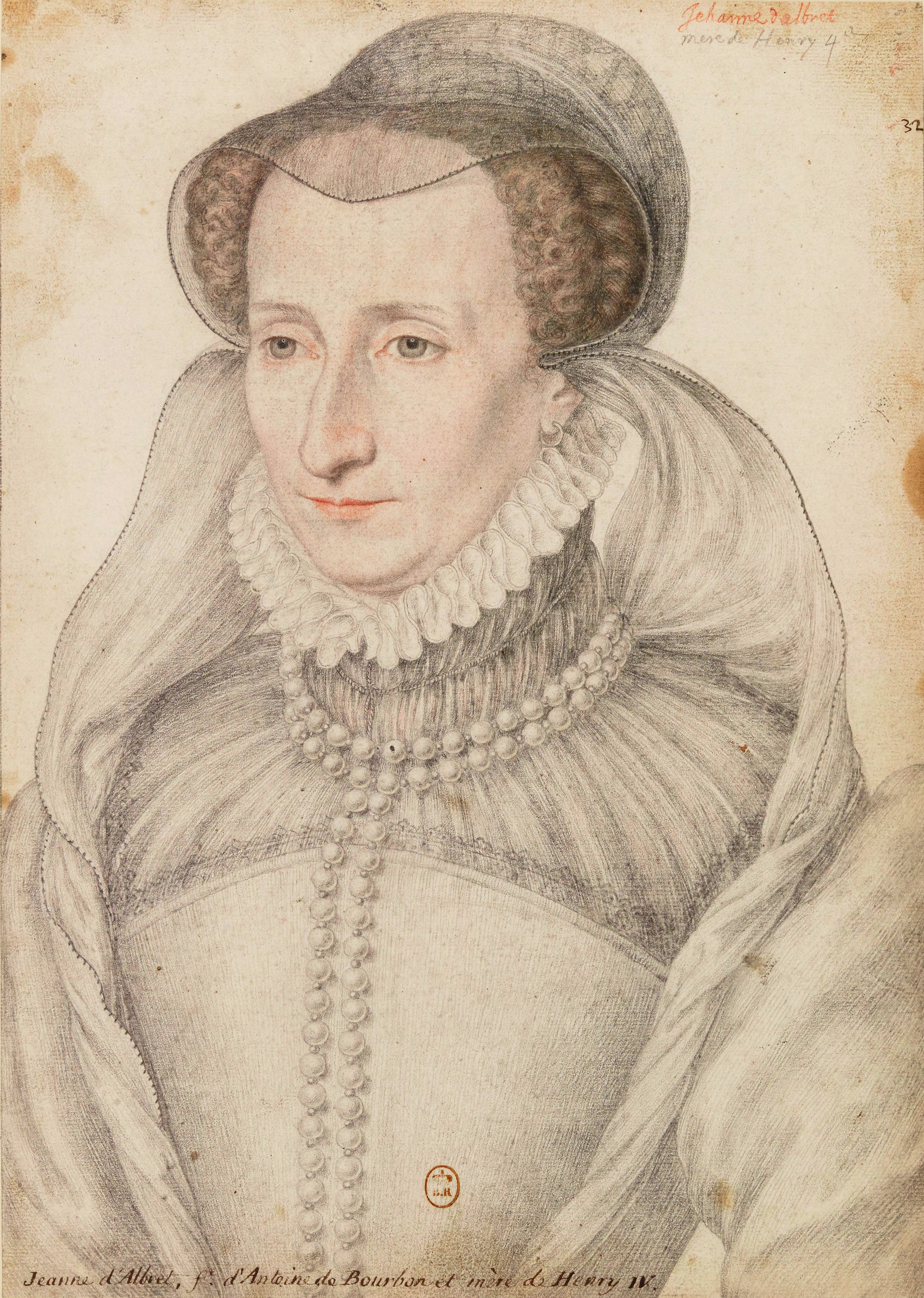
- Portrait by François Clouet, 1570

Queen of Navarre
- Reign: 25 May 1555 – 9 June 1572
- Coronation: 18 August 1555 at Pau
- Predecessor: Henry II
- Successor: Henry III
- Co-ruler: Antoine (1555–1562)

Duchess consort of Jülich-Cleves-Berg
- Tenure: 13 June 1541 – 12 October 1545
- Born: 16 November 1528; Saint-Germain-en-Laye, Kingdom of France
- Died: 9 June 1572 (aged 43); Paris, Kingdom of France
- Burial: Ducal Church of collégiale Saint-Georges, Vendôme
- Spouses: William, Duke of Jülich-Cleves-Berg (m. 1541; ann. 1545) Antoine de Bourbon (m. 1548; died 1562)
- Issue more...: Henry IV of France; Catherine, Hereditary Princess of Lorraine
- House: Albret
- Father: Henry II of Navarre
- Mother: Margaret of Angoulême
- Religion: Reformed (Huguenot), prev. Roman Catholic

Jeanne d'Albret (Spanish: Juana de Albret; Basque: Joana Albretekoa; Occitan: Joana de Labrit; 16 November 1528 – 9 June 1572), also known as Jeanne III, was Queen of Navarre from 1555 to 1572.

Jeanne was the daughter of Henry II of Navarre and Margaret of Angoulême (and thus the niece of Francis I of France). In 1541, she married William, Duke of Jülich-Cleves-Berg. The marriage was annulled in 1545. Jeanne married a second time in 1548, to Antoine de Bourbon, Duke of Vendôme. They had two surviving children, Henry and Catherine.

When her father died in 1555, Jeanne and Antoine ascended the Navarrese throne. They reigned as joint rulers until Antoine died in 1562 from wounds suffered while besieging Protestant-held Rouen during the French Wars of Religion.

After her public conversion to Calvinism in 1560, however, Jeanne had become the acknowledged spiritual and political leader of the French Huguenot movement and thus a key figure on the opposing side to that of her husband in the French Wars of Religion. During the first and second war she remained relatively neutral, but in the third war she fled to La Rochelle, becoming the de facto leader of the Huguenot-controlled city. After negotiating a peace treaty with the French queen mother Catherine de' Medici and arranging the marriage of her son to Catherine's daughter Marguerite, Jeanne died suddenly in Paris. Her son, Henry, succeeded her first as Henry III of Navarre, and then later as Henry IV of France, the first Bourbon king of France.

Jeanne was the last active ruler of Navarre. Her son inherited her kingdom, but as he was constantly leading the Huguenot forces, he entrusted the government of Béarn to his sister, Catherine, who held the regency for more than two decades. In 1620, Jeanne's grandson Louis XIII annexed Navarre to the French crown.

== Early years and first marriage ==
Jeanne was born in the royal palace of Saint-Germain-en-Laye, France, at five o'clock in the afternoon on 16 November 1528, the daughter of Henry II, King of Navarre, by his wife Marguerite of Angoulême. Her mother, the daughter of Louise of Savoy and Charles, Count of Angoulême, was the sister of Francis I of France and had previously been married to Charles IV, Duke of Alençon. She was also a writer of some talent.

Jeanne's birth was officially announced the following January 7, when King Francis gave his permission for the addition of a new master in all cities where there were incorporated guilds "in honour of the birth of Jeanne de Navarre, the king's niece". Since the age of two, as was the will of her uncle King Francis who took over her education, Jeanne was raised in the Château de Plessis-lèz-Tours in the Loire Valley (Touraine), thus living apart from her parents. She received an excellent education under the tutelage of humanist Nicolas Bourbon.

Described as a "frivolous and high-spirited princess", she also, at an early age, displayed a tendency to be both stubborn and unyielding. Holy Roman Emperor Charles V offered to have her married to his son and heir, Philip, to settle the status of the Kingdom of Navarre. On 13 June 1541, when Jeanne was 12, Francis I, for political reasons, forced her to marry William "the Rich", Duke of Jülich-Cleves-Berg, who was the brother of Anne of Cleves, the fourth wife of Henry VIII of England. Despite having been whipped into obedience, she nevertheless continued to protest and had to be carried bodily to the altar by the Constable of France, Anne de Montmorency. A description of Jeanne's appearance at her wedding revealed that she was sumptuously attired, wearing a golden crown, a silver and gold skirt encrusted with precious stones, and a crimson satin cloak richly trimmed with ermine. Before her wedding, Jeanne signed two documents which she had officers of her household sign, declaring: "I, Jeanne de Navarre, persisting in the protestations I have already made, do hereby again affirm and protest by these present, that the marriage which it is desired to contract between the duke of Cleves and myself, is against my will; that I have never consented to it, nor will consent..."

Four years later, after the duke signed an agreement with Charles V to end his alliance with France in return for the Duchy of Guelders, the marriage was annulled on the grounds that it had not been consummated and that Jeanne had to be forcibly married against her will. She remained at the royal court.

== Second marriage ==
After the death of Francis in 1547 and the accession of Henry II to the French throne, Jeanne married Antoine de Bourbon, "first prince of the blood", at Moulins in the Bourbonnais on 20 October 1548. The marriage was intended to consolidate territorial possessions in the north and south of France.

Jeanne's marriage to Antoine was described by author Mark Strage as having been a "romantic match". A contemporary of Jeanne said of her that she had

no pleasure or occupation except in talking about or writing to [her husband]. She does it in company and in private… the waters cannot quench the flame of her love".

Antoine was a notorious philanderer. In 1554, he fathered an illegitimate son, Charles, by Louise de La Béraudière de l'Isle Rouhet, a court beauty known as "La belle Rouet".

The couple had five children, of whom only two, Henry IV, king of France (1589 to 1610) and king of Navarre (1572 to 1610), and Catherine de Bourbon, lived to adulthood.

== Queen of Navarre ==
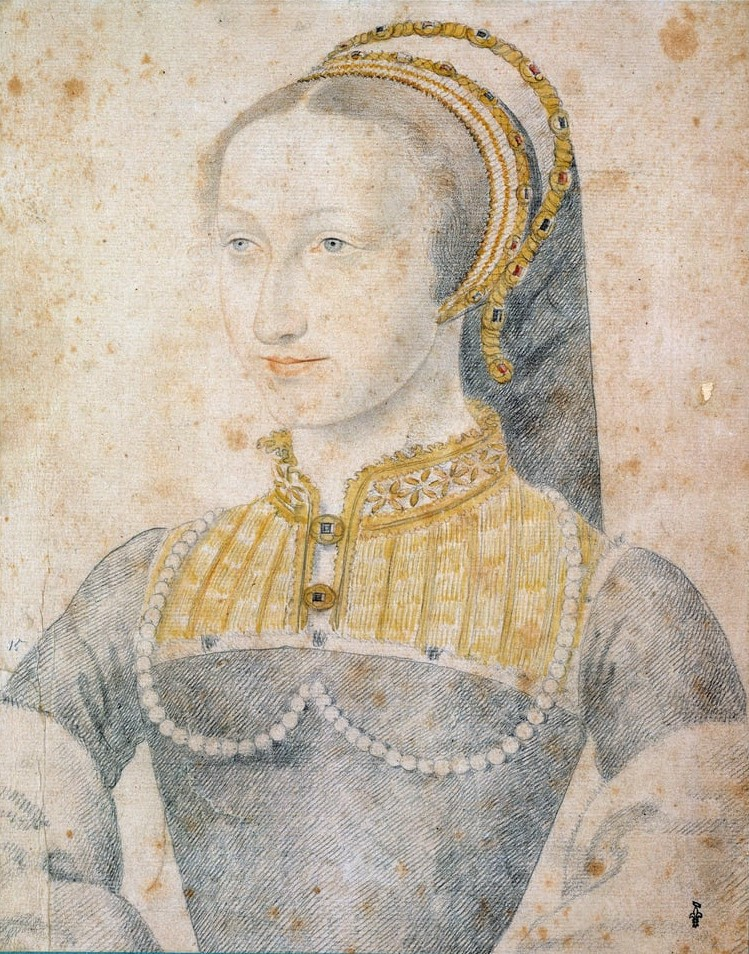
Portrait of Jeanne d'Albret by an artist of the School of Francois Clouet (16th century)

On 25 May 1555, Henry II of Navarre died, at which time Jeanne and her husband became joint rulers of Navarre. On accession to the throne, she inherited a conflict over Navarre and an independent territorial hold on Lower Navarre, Soule, and the principality of Béarn, as well as other dependencies under the suzerainty of the crown of France.

On 18 August 1555 at Pau, Jeanne and Antoine were crowned in a joint ceremony according to the rites of the Roman Catholic Church. The previous month, a coronation coin commemorating the new reign had been minted. It was inscribed in Latin with the following words: Antonius et Johanna Dei gratia reges Navarrae Domini Bearni (Antoine and Jeanne, by the grace of God, monarchs of Navarre and lords of Béarn). Antoine's frequent absences left Jeanne in Béarn to rule alone and in complete charge of a household which she managed with a firm and resolute hand.

Jeanne was influenced by her mother, who died in 1549, with leanings toward religious reform, humanist thinking, and individual liberty. This legacy was influential in her decision to convert to Calvinism. In the first year of her reign, Queen Jeanne III called a conference of beleaguered Protestant Huguenot ministers. She later declared Calvinism the official religion of her kingdom after publicly embracing the teachings of John Calvin on Christmas Day 1560. This conversion made her the highest-ranking Protestant in France. She became designated as an enemy of the Counter-Reformation mounted by the Catholic Church.

Following the imposition of Calvinism in her kingdom, priests and nuns were banished, Catholic churches destroyed, and Catholic ritual prohibited. She commissioned the translation of the New Testament into Basque and Béarnese for the benefit of her subjects.

She was described as "small of stature, frail but erect", her face was narrow, her eyes light-coloured, cold and unmoving, and her lips thin. She was highly intelligent, but austere and self-righteous. Her speech was sharply sarcastic and vehement. Agrippa d'Aubigné, the Huguenot chronicler, described Jeanne as having "a mind powerful enough to guide the highest affairs".

In addition to her religious reforms, Jeanne worked on reorganising her kingdom, making long-lasting reforms to the economic and judicial systems of her domains.

In 1561, Catherine de' Medici, in her role as regent for her son King Charles IX, appointed Antoine Lieutenant General of France. Jeanne and Catherine had encountered each other at court in the latter years of Francis I's reign and shortly after Henry II's ascension to the French throne, when Catherine attained the rank of queen consort. The historian Mark Strage suggested that Jeanne was one of Catherine's main detractors, contemptuously referring to her as the "Florentine grocer's daughter".

== French Wars of Religion ==
The power struggle between Catholics and Huguenots for control of the French court and France as a whole led to the outbreak of the French Wars of Religion in 1562. Jeanne and Antoine were at court when the latter made the decision to support the Catholic faction, which was headed by the House of Guise, and in consequence, threatened to repudiate Jeanne when she refused to attend Mass. Catherine de' Medici, in an attempt to steer a middle course between the two warring factions, also pleaded with Jeanne to obey her husband for the sake of peace but to no avail. Jeanne stood her ground and staunchly refused to abandon the Calvinist religion; she continued to have Protestant services conducted in her apartments.

When many of the other nobles also joined the Catholic camp, Catherine had no choice but to support the Catholic faction. Fearing the anger of both her husband and Catherine, Jeanne left Paris in March 1562 and made her way south to seek refuge in Béarn.

When Jeanne had stopped for a brief sojourn at her husband's ancestral chateau in Vendôme on 14 May to break her lengthy homeward journey, she failed to prevent a 400-strong Huguenot force from invading the town. The troop marauded through the streets of Vendôme, robbed and sacked all the churches, abused the inhabitants, and pillaged the ducal chapel, which housed the tombs of Antoine's ancestors. In consequence, her husband adopted a belligerent stance with her. He issued orders to Blaise de Lasseran-Massencôme, Seigneur de Montluc, to have her arrested and returned to Paris, where she would subsequently be sent to a Catholic convent. She resumed her journey after leaving Vendôme and managed to elude her captors, safely passing over the frontier into Béarn before she could be intercepted by the Seigneur de Montluc and his troops.

At the end of the year, Antoine was fatally wounded at the siege of Rouen and died before Jeanne could obtain the necessary permission to cross over enemy lines in order to be at his bedside, where she had wished to nurse him. His mistress instead was summoned to his deathbed. Jeanne henceforth ruled Navarre as the sole queen regnant, her sex being no impediment to her sovereignty. Her son Henry subsequently became "first prince of the blood". Jeanne often brought him along on her many progresses through her domains to oversee administrative affairs. Jeanne refused an offer of matrimony issued by Philip II of Spain, who had hoped to marry her to his son on the condition that she return to the Catholic faith.

Jeanne's position in the conflicts remained relatively neutral in the beginning, being mainly preoccupied with military defences, given Navarre's geographic location beside Catholic Spain. Papal envoys arrived to coax or coerce her into returning to Catholicism and abolishing heresy within her kingdom. Her response was to reply that "the authority of the Pope's legate is not recognised in Béarn". At one stage, there was a plot led by Philip II to have her kidnapped and turned over to the Spanish Inquisition, where she would be imprisoned in Madrid and the rulers of France and Spain invited to annex Navarre to their crowns. Jeanne was summoned to Rome by Pius IV to be examined for heresy under the triple penalty of excommunication, the confiscation of her property, and a declaration that her kingdom was available to any ruler who wished to invade it.

This last threat alarmed King Philip, and the blatant interference by the Papacy in French affairs also enraged Catherine de' Medici, who, on behalf of Charles IX, sent angry letters of protest to the Pope. The threats never materialised. During the French court's royal progress between January 1564 and May 1565, Jeanne met and held talks with Catherine de' Medici at Mâcon and Nérac.

=== Third war ===
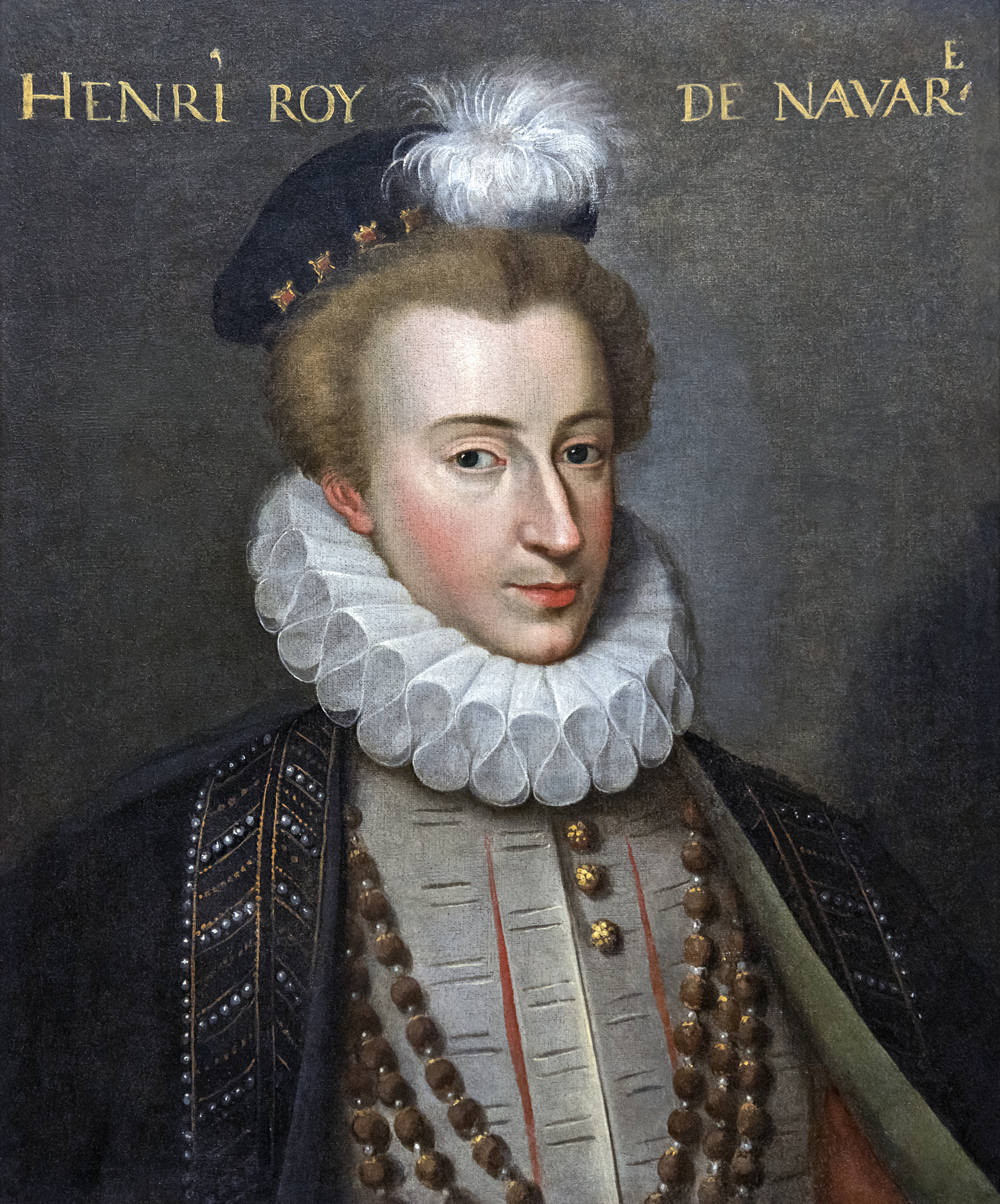
Henry of Bourbon, Jeanne's only surviving son, whom she presented as one of the legitimate leaders of the Huguenot cause

When the third religious war broke out in 1568, however, she decided to actively support the Huguenot cause. Feeling that their lives were in danger from approaching French Catholic and Spanish troops, Jeanne and Henry sought refuge in the Protestant stronghold of La Rochelle. (Note: Departing on 23 August (Roelker 1968, p. 297) and arriving on 28 September. (Roelker 1968, p. 301).)

As Minister of Propaganda, Jeanne wrote manifestos and composed letters to sympathetic foreign rulers, requesting their assistance. She had visualised the province of Guyenne as a "Protestant homeland" and played a leading role in the military actions from 1569 to 1570 with the aim of seeing her dream come to fruition.

Whilst at La Rochelle, she assumed control of fortifications, finances, intelligence gathering, and the maintenance of discipline among the civilian populace. She used her own jewellery as security in a loan obtained from Elizabeth I of England and oversaw the well-being of the numerous refugees who sought shelter within La Rochelle. She often accompanied Admiral de Coligny to the battlefield where the fighting was at its most intense; together, they inspected the defences and rallied the Huguenot forces. She established a religious seminary in La Rochelle, drawing the most learned Huguenot men in France within its walls.

Following the Huguenot defeat on 16 March 1569 at the Battle of Jarnac, Jeanne's brother-in-law, Louis, was captured and subsequently executed. Gaspard de Coligny assumed command of the Huguenot forces nominally on behalf of her son Henry and Condé's son, Henri I de Bourbon, Prince de Condé. Jeanne established a loan of 20,000 livres from England, using her jewels as security, for the Huguenot cause.

=== Peace of Saint-Germain-en-Laye ===
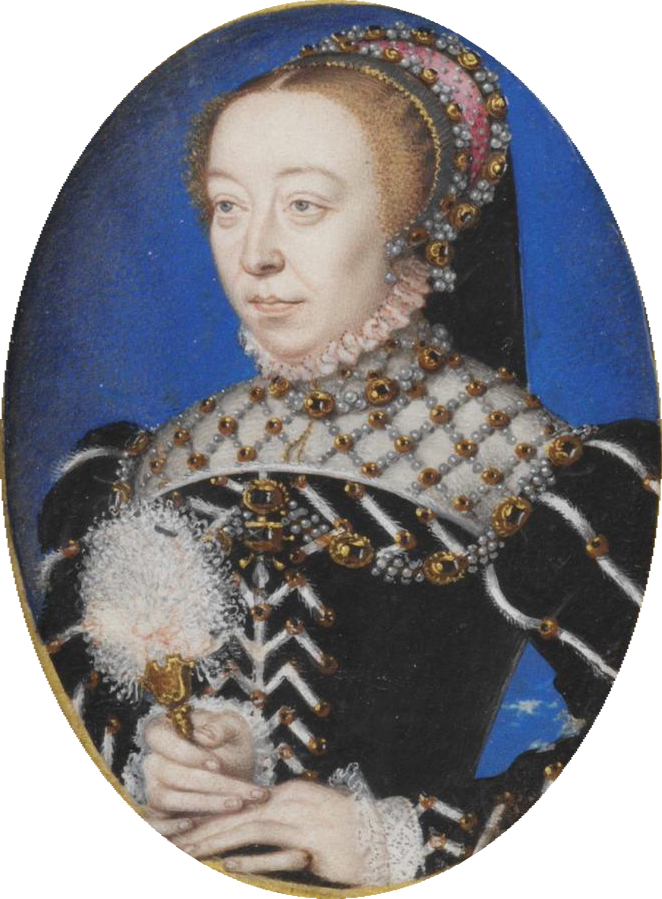
Queen Mother and French regent Catherine de' Medici. Following the Peace of Saint-Germain-en-Laye, Jeanne and Catherine arranged a marriage of convenience between their children.

Jeanne was the principal mover in negotiating the Peace of Saint-Germain-en-Laye which ended this "third war" in August 1570 after the Catholic army ran out of money. That same year, as part of the conditions set out in the peace treaty, a marriage of convenience Jeanne reluctantly agreed to was arranged between her son and King Charles IX's sister, Marguerite. This was in exchange for the right of Huguenots to hold public office in France, a privilege which they had previously been denied. Jeanne, despite her mistrust of Catherine de' Medici, accepted the latter's invitation for a personal meeting to negotiate the marriage settlement.

Taking her daughter Catherine along, Jeanne went to Chenonceaux on 14 February 1572, where the two powerful women from opposing factions met. Jeanne found the atmosphere at Chenonceaux corrupt and vicious and wrote letters to her son advising him about the promiscuity of the young women at Catherine's court, whose forward and wanton behaviour with the courtiers scandalised Jeanne's puritanical nature. In one of her letters to Henry, she issued the following warning: "Not for anything on earth would I have you come to live here. Although I knew it was bad, I find it even worse than I feared. Here it is the women who make advances to the men, rather than the other way around. If you were here you would never escape without special intervention from God". Jeanne also complained to her son the Queen Mother mistreated and mocked her as they negotiated terms of the settlement, writing on 8 March, "she treats me so shamefully that you might say that the patience I manage to maintain surpasses that of Griselda herself".

== Death ==
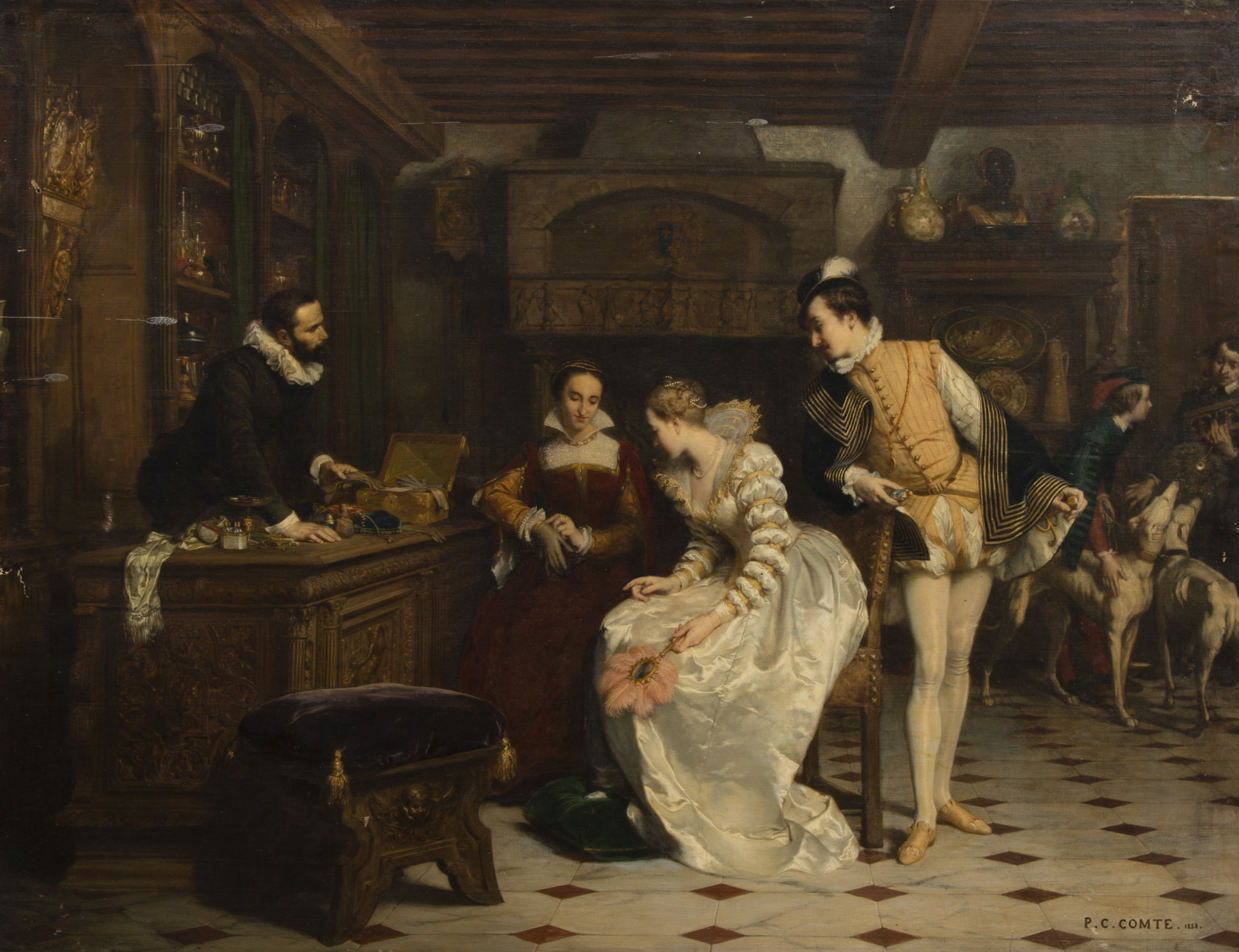
Jeanne d'Albret buying poisoned gloves from Catherine de' Medici's parfumeur, René, history painting by Pierre-Charles Comte, Salon of 1852.

The two women reached an agreement. Jeanne took leave of Catherine de' Medici following the signing of the marriage contract between Henry and Marguerite on 11 April. She set up residence in Paris, where she went on daily shopping trips to prepare for the upcoming wedding. Anna d'Este described Jeanne during this period in a letter she wrote to a friend: "The Queen of Navarre is here, not in very good health but very courageous. She is wearing more pearls than ever".

On 4 June 1572, two months before the wedding was due to take place, Jeanne returned home from one of her shopping excursions feeling ill. The next morning she woke up with a fever and complained of an ache in the upper right-hand side of her body. Five days later, she died. A popular rumour which circulated shortly afterward maintained that Jeanne had been poisoned by Catherine de' Medici, who allegedly sent her a pair of perfumed gloves, skillfully poisoned by her perfumer, René Bianchi, a fellow Florentine. This fanciful chain of events also appears in the Romantic writer Alexandre Dumas's 1845 novel La Reine Margot, as well as Christopher Marlowe's play The Massacre at Paris and Michel Zevaco's 1907 novel L’Épopée d’Amour (in the Pardaillan series). An autopsy, however, proved that Jeanne had died of natural causes.

After her funeral, a cortege bearing her body travelled through the streets of Vendôme. She was buried beside her husband at Ducal Church of collégiale Saint-Georges. The tombs were destroyed when the church was sacked in 1793 during the French Revolution. Her son Henry succeeded her, becoming King Henry III of Navarre. In 1589, he ascended the French throne as Henry IV, founding the Bourbon line of kings.

== Writings ==
Like her mother, Jeanne was a skilled author and enjoyed writing poetry. She also wrote her memoirs in which she justified her actions as leader of the Huguenots.

== Titles ==
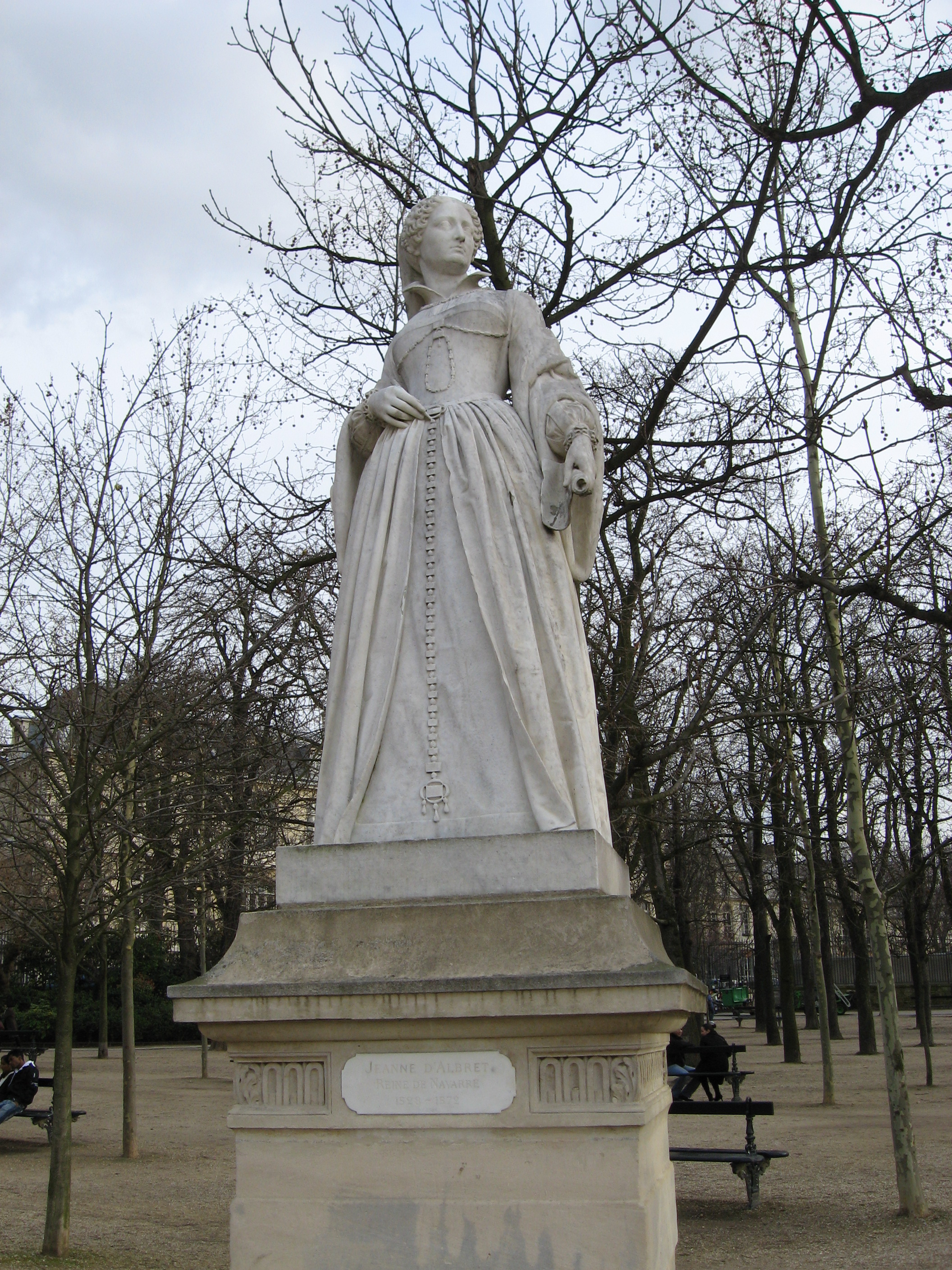
Statue of Jeanne III, from the Reines de France et Femmes illustres series in Paris

=== By birth ===
- Queen of Navarre (1555–1572)
- Duchess of Albret (1555–1572)
- Countess of Limoges (1555–1572)
- Countess of Foix (1555–1572)
- Countess of Armagnac (1555–1572)
- Countess of Bigorre (1555–1572)
- Countess of Périgord (1555–1572)
- Co-Princess of Andorra (1555–1572)

=== By marriage ===
- Duchess of Jülich-Cleves-Berg (1541–1545)
- Duchess of Vendôme (1550–1562)
- Duchess of Beaumont (1550–1562)
- Countess of Marle (1548–1562)
- Countess of La Fère (1548–1562)
- Countess of Soissons (1550–1562)

== Marriages and children ==
In 1541 Jeanne married William, Duke of Jülich-Cleves-Berg, a marriage that was annulled in 1545 by Pope Paul III, with no children.

On 20 October 1548, she married Antoine de Bourbon, Duke of Vendôme, and they had:

1. Henri of Bourbon, Duke of Beaumont (1551–1553)
2. Henri of Bourbon (Henry III of Navarre and IV of France) (13 December 1553 – 14 May 1610), married Margaret of Valois but had no children. Remarried Marie de' Medici in 1600 and had issue.
3. Louis Charles of Bourbon, Count of Marle (1555–1557)
4. Madeleine of Bourbon (1556-1556)
5. Catherine of Bourbon (7 February 1559 – 13 February 1604), also known as Catherine of Navarre, who married Henry, Hereditary Prince of Lorraine in 1599.

== Ancestry ==
Ancestors of Jeanne d'Albret

8. Alain I, Lord of Albret
4. John III of Navarre
9. Frances, Countess of Périgord
2. Henry II of Navarre
10. Gaston, Prince of Viana
5. Catherine of Navarre
11. Magdalena of Valois
1. Jeanne d'Albret, Queen of Navarre
12. John, Count of Angoulême
6. Charles, Count of Angoulême
13. Marguerite de Rohan
3. Marguerite of Angoulême
14. Philip II, Duke of Savoy
7. Louise of Savoy
15. Margaret of Bourbon

== Sources ==
- Henry Gardiner Adams, ed. (1857). "Albret, Jeanne d'" . A Cyclopaedia of Female Biography: 26–28. Wikidata Q115583595 – via Wikisource.
- Apalategi, Ur (2016). "The recent systemic repositioning of literature in the French Basque Country: Origins of a literary subfield". In Domínguez, César; González, Anxo Abuín; Sapega, Ellen (eds.). A Comparative History of Literatures in the Iberian Peninsula. Vol. II. John Benjamins Publishing Company. ISBN 9789027266910.
- Bainton, Roland H. (1973). Women of the Reformation in France and England. Minneapolis: Ausburg Publishing House.
- Bergin, Joseph (1996). The Making of the French Episcopate, 1589–1661. St. Edmundsbury Press Ltd.
- Bryson, David (1999). Queen Jeanne and the Promised Land: Dynasty, Homeland, Religion, and Violence in Sixteenth-Century France.
- Davis, Julia (2016). "How Catherine de Medici Made Gloves Laced with Poison Fashionable". Atlas Obscura.
- Love, Ronald S. (2005). ""A Princelike Soldier and Soldierlike Prince": Contemporary Views of the Military Leadership of Henry IV". Journal of the Western Society for French History. 33.
- Reid, Jonathan (2009). King's Sister – Queen of Dissent: Marguerite of Navarre (1492-1549) and her Evangelical Network. Brill.
- Robin, Diana Maury; Larsen, Anne R.; Levin, Carole (2007). Encyclopedia of women in the Renaissance: Italy, France, and England. ABC-CLIO, Inc.
- Roelker, Nancy Lyman (1968). Queen of Navarre, Jeanne d'Albret: 1528–1572. Cambridge Massachusetts: Belknap Press of Harvard University Press. ISBN 0-674-74150-1.
- Strage, Mark (1976). Women of Power: The Life and Times of Catherine de' Medici. New York and London: Harcourt Brace Jovanovich. ISBN 0-15-198370-4.
- Vincent, Marylène (2015). Henri IV et les femmes. De l'amour à la mort (in French). Sud Ouest.
- Thompson, James Westfall (1915). The Wars of Religion in France, 1559-1576. Frederick Ungar Publishing Co.

Jeanne d'Albret House of Albret Born: 16 November 1528 Died: 9 June 1572
Regnal titles
Preceded by Henry II	Queen of Navarre; Countess of Foix; 25 May 1555 – 9 June 1572 with Antoine	Succeeded by Henry III
Preceded by Henry II	Co-Princess of Andorra; 25 May 1555 – 9 June 1572 with Miquel Despuig (1555–1556); Joan Pérez García de Oliván (1556–1560); Pere de Castellet (1561–1571)	Succeeded by Henry III
