= René Bianchi (perfumer) =

Italian perfumer

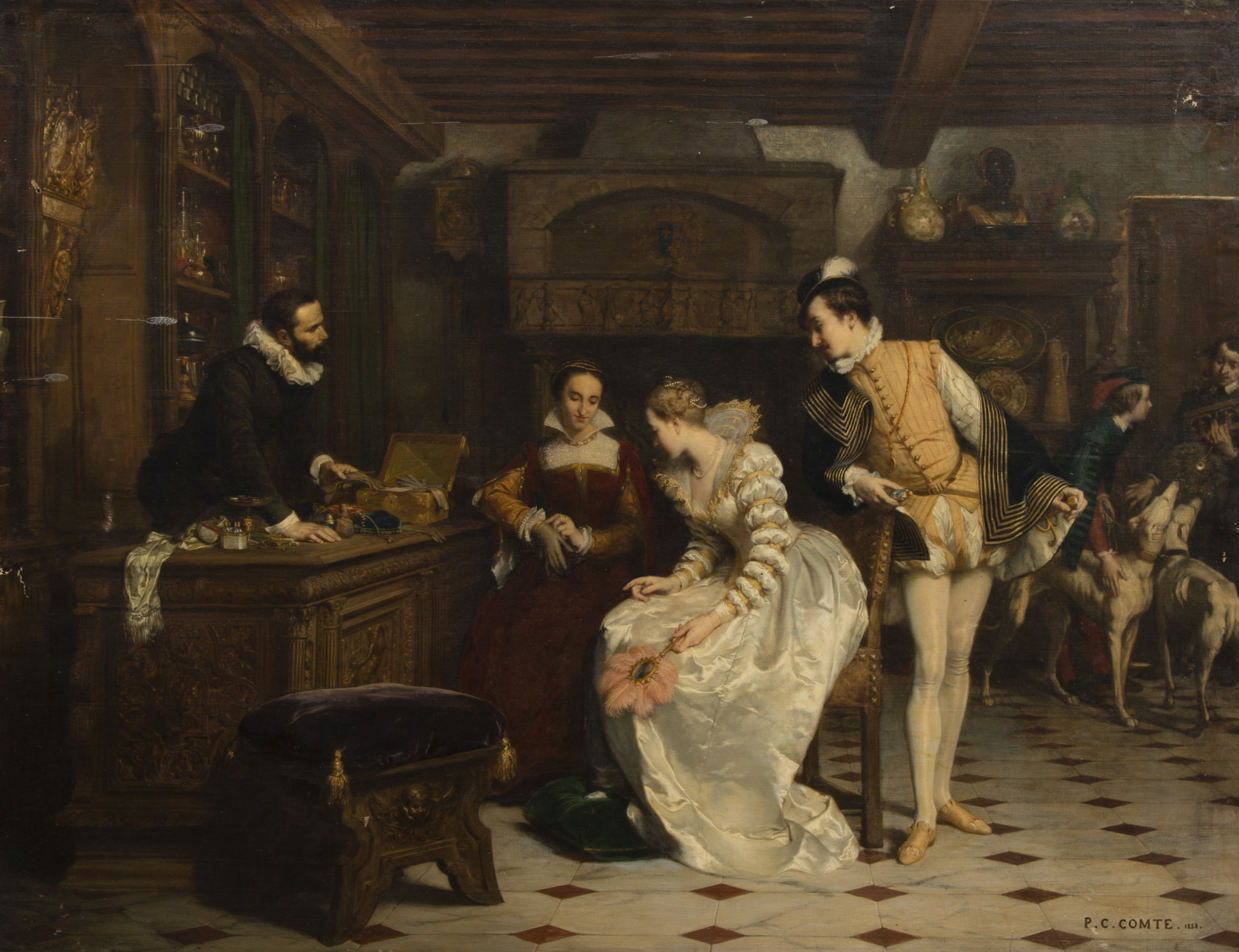
- Jeanne III of Navarre buying poisoned gloves from René Bianchi (left) by Pierre-Charles Comte, 1852
- Born: Renato Bianco; Italy
- Died: 1578; France
- Occupation: Perfumer

René Bianchi (Renato Bianco), commonly known as Maître Rene (died 1578), was a perfumer from Italy (probably from either Florence or Milan) who lived on the Pont Saint-Michel in Paris. He was the official court perfumer of the queen of France, Catherine de' Medici, from at least 1547 onward. He is infamous in history as the queen's alleged poisoner, whom she hired to use his poisons on enemies she did not wish to kill by the sword.
