= Constance of Béarn =

French noblewoman

Constance
- suo jure Viscountess of Marsan; Countess consort of Geneva
- Born: 1245–1255
- Died: 26 April 1310
- Noble family: Montcada
- Spouses: Alfonso, Prince of Aragon; Henry of Almain; Aymon II of Geneva
- Father: Gaston VII, Viscount of Béarn
- Mother: Martha of Marsan

Constance (born 1245–1255, died 1310) was suo jure Viscountess of Marsan as well as titular Countess of Bigorre, daughter of Gaston VII, Viscount of Béarn and his first wife Martha of Marsan. Constance inherited all of her titles from her mother and contended to inherit her father's Viscounty of Béarn. She was married three times during her lifetime, marrying into the royal families of Aragon, Castile and England.

== Life ==
Constance was born between 1245 and 1255 the daughter of Gaston VII, Viscount of Béarn and Martha of Marsan. She had three sisters: Margaret, Martha and Guilemette. No exact birth dates are known for any of the sisters, all were born within the aforementioned timeframe but Constance was most probably the eldest because she inherited Martha's estates when she died.

=== Marriages ===
When Constance was in her early teenage years, she travelled to Aragon and married at Calatayud on March 23, 1260, to Infante Alfonso, son and heir of James I of Aragon. The marriage only lasted three days, Alfonso died on March 26.

In 1266, Constance was betrothed to Infante Manuel of Castile, who was son of Ferdinand III of Castile. Manuel's first wife, Constance's one-time sister-in-law Constance of Aragon had died, so Manuel was seeking remarriage. A marriage contract was signed at Seville, with Constance's sister Guilemette being betrothed to Manuel's son Alfonso. However, nothing came of the arrangements and so neither couple married.

A third marriage contract was drawn up in 1268, for Constance to marry Henry of Almain, a grandson of King John of England. She travelled to England the following year and the couple were married at Windsor Castle on 5 May 1269. This second marriage was also brief, Henry repudiated Constance the following year and then died himself in 1271.

Constance married for a third and final time in 1279 to Aymon II of Geneva. The marriage had been arranged by Constance's stepmother Beatrice of Savoy, Dame of Faucigny. Like the first two marriages, this marriage was also brief with Aymon dying within a year. Constance had no children.

=== Inheritance disputes ===
Upon the death of Constance's mother, she succeeded her as Viscountess of Marsan. Through her mother, Constance had a claim on the County of Bigorre, her mother had been actively pursuing her claim against her niece, Laura, who was sister to the previous Count, Eskivat de Chabanais. Fighting over Bigorre had begun in 1251 due to the problems left by Constance's maternal grandmother Petronilla, Countess of Bigorre. She had made Simon de Montfort, 6th Earl of Leicester, governor of Bigorre and upon her death, he had refused to hand over control to Constance's aunt Alice. With assistance from Constance's parents, Alice had succeeded. The brief time of stability ended with the death of Eskivat. Martha then claimed Bigorre, as did Laura. Upon the death of Martha during the late 1270s, Constance inherited her claim. Her father, Gaston then assisted his daughter by attacking Bigorre, which was once again occupied by Simon de Montfort. The overlord, Edward I of England, did not like the thought of a union between Béarn and Bigorre so had John Grailly placed there as general, forcing Gaston to pull back. Constance responded by appealing to Philip IV of France, who responded by calling the whole family to his court to discuss the situation, but eventually seized Bigorre for the crown. Bigorre then remained under French control until it was claimed in 1425 by John I, Count of Foix, a descendant of Constance's sister, Margaret.

Gaston never had any sons, Beatrice of Savoy bore him no children so his heirs were his four daughters. Gaston bypassed the claim of Constance, possibly due to her inheritance of her mother's own Viscount of Marsan and instead decided to leave the Viscount of Béarn to his second daughter, Margaret and her husband Roger-Bernard III, Count of Foix. Gaston's will was disputed by their third sister Martha and her husband Gerald VI, Count of Armagnac. As a result, Guilemette was made heiress, bypassing the claims of Constance, Margaret and Martha. Upon the death of Gaston in 1290, disputes had made him leave Constance with Béarn but she soon handed it over to her sister Margaret, who had children of her own at this point, whilst Constance remained without children.

Constance died on April 26, 1310, only five days after her stepmother Beatrice. Marsan then passed to Margaret, joining it with the Béarn inheritance.

== Notes ==
Constance of Béarn House of Montcada
Regnal titles
Preceded by Martha	Viscountess of Marsan c. 1273–1310	Succeeded by Margaret
Preceded by Gaston VII	Viscountess of Béarn; 1290	Succeeded by Margaret
Preceded by Eskivat	— DISPUTED — Countess of Bigorre; 1283–1292; Disputed by Laura	Vacant Sequestration Title next held by Charles as interim count
