= Sancho of Provence =

Sancho
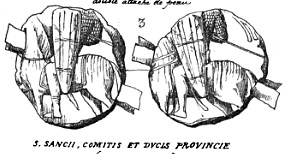
- Partially preserved seal of Sancho of Provence

Count of Provence
- Reign: 1181–1185
- Predecessor: Ramon Berenguer III
- Successor: Alfonso II

Count of Cerdanya
- Reign: 1175–1188
- Predecessor: Peter
- Successor: Nuño Sánchez

Count of Roussillon
- Reign: 1208–1212
- Successor: Nuño Sánchez
- Died: 1223
- Spouse: Ermessenda; Sancha Nuñez de Lara
- Issue: Nuño, Count of Cerdanya
- House: Barcelona
- Father: Ramon Berenguer IV, Count of Barcelona
- Mother: Petronilla of Aragon

Sancho (died 1223), also spelled Sanç or Sanche, (Note: "Sancho" is Spanish, "Sanç" is Catalan and Occitan and "Sanche" is French.) was a Catalano-Aragonese nobleman and statesman, the youngest son of Queen Petronilla of Aragon and Count Raymond Berengar IV of Barcelona. He was at different times the count of Cerdanya (c.1175–1188), Provence (1181–1185), Gévaudan, Rodez and Carlat (1183–1185), and Roussillon (1208–1212). (Note: Provence was part of the Kingdom of Arles in the Holy Roman Empire, while Roussillon and Cerdanya were nominally part of the Kingdom of France at the time; Gévaudan, Rodez and Carlat were indisputably part of France. The County of Provence only encompassed part of Provence, which also included the Marquisate of Provence (ruled by the counts of Toulouse) and the County of Forcalquier. Roussillon and Cerdanya effectively belonged to the Counts of Barcelona, who were de facto independent princes ruling an emerging Principality of Catalonia. France only formally ceded its rights in these counties in the Treaty of Corbeil (1258).) He served as the regent of Provence from 1209 until 1218 during the minority of Count Raymond Berengar IV, and as regent of Aragon from 1214 until 1218, during the minority of King James I.

== Life ==
=== Count of Cerdanya ===
Sancho was a minor at the time of his father's death (1162) and he did not inherit lands or titles, but only the right of reversion should his elder brothers die without heirs. Thus, according to his father's will, he should have inherited Provence and Cerdanya only after his elder brother Ramon Berenguer III of Provence was assassinated in 1181. In fact, while he inherited Provence at that time, he appears to have received Cerdanya shortly before that.

Sancho came of age between 1175, when he first began witnessing the royal charters of his eldest brother, King Alfonso II of Aragon, and 1180. In these years, he witnessed charters only in Catalonia and Provence. Before 1180, he occasionally signed documents with the title "Count of Cerdanya" (comes Ceritanie), but usually he was described as just "the king's brother". Alfonso does not seem to have entirely trusted his administration of Cerdanya, for he intervened in the county in 1177 and again in 1188. Sancho is not recorded as count of Cerdanya after that.

=== Count of Provence ===
When Sancho inherited the county of Provence in 1181, he probably also inherited the governing arrangement that had been set up by Alfonso. His power would have been heavily circumscribed by a council. His first responsibility as count was to defend the county from the claims of Count Raymond V of Toulouse. For the following four years, Sancho and his brother Alfonso prosecuted a war against Toulouse. On 9 December 1182, Alfonso visited his brother in Aix and exempted the Knights Hospitaller from commercial duties and tolls in Provence. In March 1183, Alfonso enfeoffed Sancho with the counties of Gévaudan, Rodez and Carlat. Sancho's expense account for his stay at Perpignan in November 1184, where he met his brother, has survived and provides a detailed look at how his court functioned.

Early in his administration of Provence, conflict arose every spring between him and the neighbouring prince, Count William IV of Forcalquier. Finally, in 1184, Sancho signed a treaty of alliance with the count of Forcalquier, the count of Toulouse and the Republic of Genoa agreeing to oppose the king of Aragon's efforts to dominate Genoa and to take the city of Marseille from him. Sancho then intervened on the side of Genoa in that commune's war against Pisa. These actions of disloyalty caused a rift between the brothers, and Alfonso dispossessed Sancho of Provence, Gévaudan, Rodez and Carlat. In his place he appointed Roger-Bernard I, count of Foix, as his bailiff or procurator in Provence.

According to some historians, the king was merely looking for an excuse to seize control of Provence. Alfonso was in Aix by March 1185, when the dating clause of a charter reads "when we recovered Provence from the hands of Sancho, our brother". Evidence of Alfonso's ill-will towards Sancho can be found in the Gesta comitum Barcinonensium, which records that Alfonso "never loved [his brother Sancho] and did not wish to give him anything in his kingdom." (Note: Fratrem quoque suum iam dicti Ildefonsi regis Aragonensis, Sancium nomine, nunquam dilexit et nullam portionem sui regni illi dare voluit.) The hostility between Sancho and Alfonso caught the notice of the troubadour Peire Vidal, who addresses the king in a tornada:

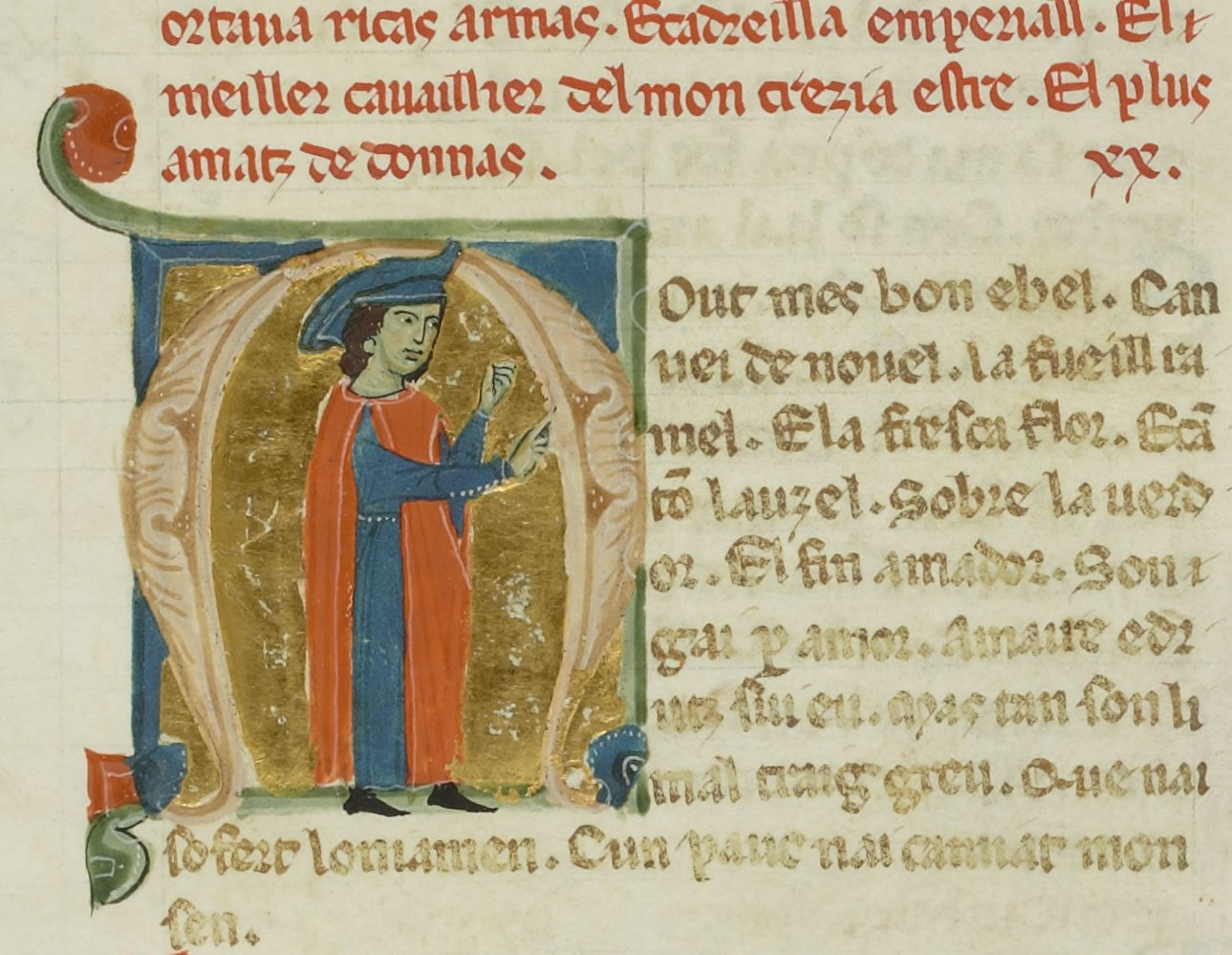
The troubadour Peire Vidal was a contemporary critic of Sancho's government of Provence.

Francs reis, Proensa·us apella,
qu'En Sancho la·us desclavella,
e gasta·us la cer'e·l mel
e sai tramet vos lo fel.

(Noble king, Provence is calling out to you, it is being despoiled by Lord Sancho, he is taking the wax and honey and sending you nothing but gall.)

By contrast, the troubadour Bertran de Born presents Sancho as popular in Provence:

Proenza pert, don es eissitz,
que so frair Sanso prezan mais...

(He [Alfonso] is losing Provence, which he left, where his brother Sancho is better loved...)

After his removal from office, Sancho continued to style himself Count of Provence.

=== Count of Roussillon and procurator of Provence ===
In 1204, Sancho and his son, Nuño Sánchez, witnessed the donation of the county of Roussillon to Maria of Montpellier, the new wife of King Peter II, Sancho's nephew. Since Roussillon was a region in which Sancho had ambitions, his recognition of the donation to Maria was critical. In 1208, Peter finally granted Sancho the county of Roussillon. In 1209–10, Sancho left the day-to-day government in the hands of a "vicar and bailiff" (vicarius et baiulus), Ferran de Norvais. In January 1211, Peter granted the county's revenues to Guillem de Creixell, since Guillem was the king's creditor, but Sancho continued to govern the county into 1212.

In 1209, Sancho's nephew and King Alfonso's successor in Provence, Count Alfonso II, died. He left behind a minor, Raymond Berengar IV, as his heir. King Peter appointed Sancho governor of Provence on behalf of Raymond Berengar. One of his first tasks was to subdue the rebellious city of Arles. Sancho also promptly brought his own son, Nuño, into the government of Provence. Together they pursued a policy that favoured communal liberties and commercial activity while opposing encroaching French and Papal influence. As a base of support in Provence, Peter granted Sancho and Nuño the ports of Agazi, Boch and Monaco.

In 1212, Sancho fought at the Battle of Las Navas de Tolosa on the side of Peter II. That same year Roussillon was transferred from Sancho to his son Nuño, to be held by the latter along with Cerdanya and Conflent for life.

Peter II died fighting the anti-Catharist crusaders at the Battle of Muret in 1213. His heir and successor, James I, a minor, was taken captive by Simon IV de Montfort, earl of Leicester. An army was soon assembled at Narbonne with the support of Viscount Aimery III to recover the captive king and avenge the dead king. Sancho and his son Nuño were among the leading men present. The situation was diffused, however, by the papal legate Peter of Benevento, who secured James's release.

=== Procurator general of the realm ===
==== Opposition and setbacks (1214–1216) ====
Since Peter had placed his kingdom under the authority of the Papacy, the papal legate arranged for James to be placed under the guardianship of Guillem de Montrodon, master of the Templars in Aragon, and for Sancho to be appointed procurator general, effectively regent. The exact date of Sancho's appointment is uncertain: it occurred either late in 1214 or early in 1215. James in his autobiographical Llibre dels fets, later accused Sancho of wanting to be king and of plotting to seize the throne. Although this claim has been widely accepted by historians, the historian Salvador Sanpere wrote a short monograph in an effort to "vindicate" Sancho's actions.

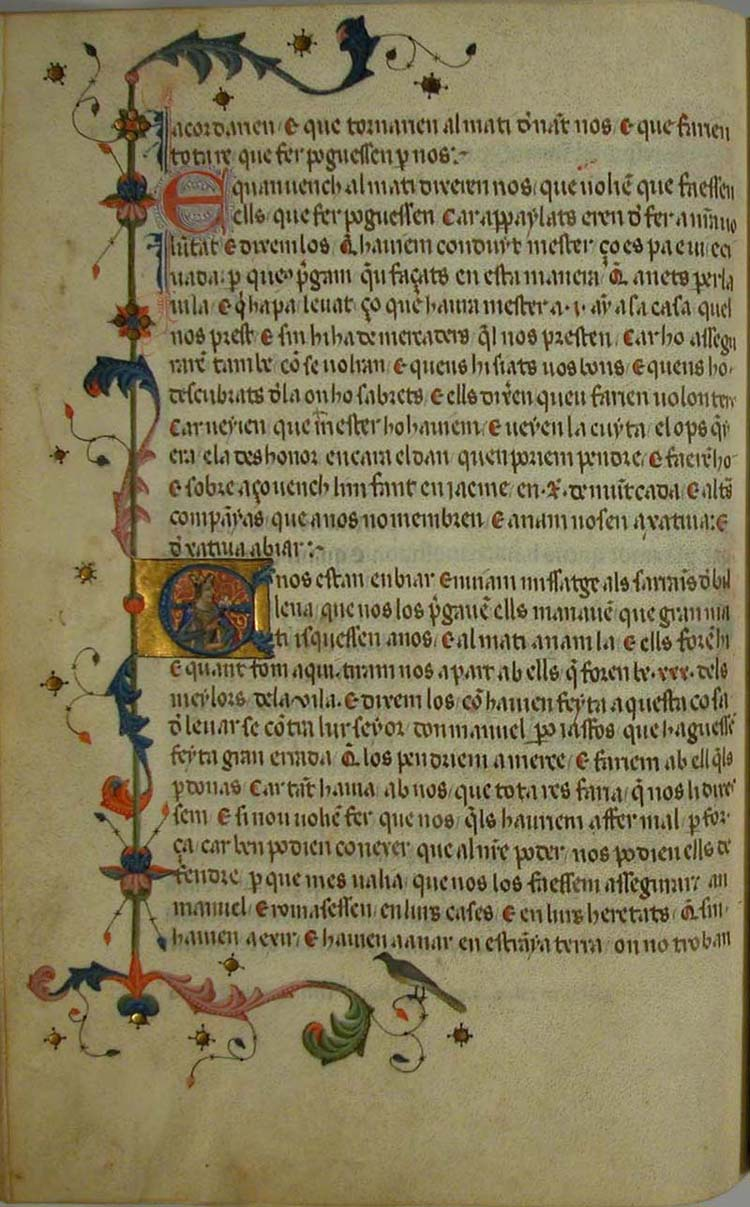
The Llibre dels fets of James I accuses his great uncle of plotting to seize the throne

In the summer of 1214, Peter of Benevento convened a council of the realm in Lleida. The assembled clergy and nobility agreed on a political programme for James's minority that included a prohibition on new taxes. Sancho was charged with implementing the programme. His power base, however, was in Provence and he had limited support in Aragon and Catalonia, especially for his preferred policy of continuing the war against Simon de Montfort.

In 1214, Gaston VI, viscount of Béarn and count of Bigorre, died. In order to prevent the county of Bigorre from falling out of Aragon's orbit, Sancho arranged for his son Nuño to marry Gaston's widow, the hereditary countess Petronilla, in 1215. The plan failed when the clergy annulled the marriage in 1216. Petronilla ended up marrying Guy de Montfort, brother of Simon.

In November 1215, Sancho sent two envoys, Pedro Ahones and Guillem IV de Cervera, to attend the Fourth Council of the Lateran in Rome as representatives of Aragon. At the council, they undermined Sancho's anti-crusade policy, alongside Bishop Hispan of Segorbe. In the end, the council upheld the legality of the crusade. In a letter addressed to Pope Innocent III, Sancho had also requested enhanced authority as procurator, but the envoys returned instead with a series of orders dated 23 January 1216 in which Innocent appointed seven noblemen from both Aragon and Catalonia as deputy counsellors to assist Sancho and ordered all the men of the realm to observe the truce with the crusaders. Innocent did order the cities of the Aragon and Catalonia to subsidise the regent's redemption of pledged lands (royal demesne that had been pawned by Peter II to fund his wars), but royal finances were transferred to Guillem de Montrodon. As a result, Sancho found his power curtailed rather than strengthened.

==== War in Occitania (1216–1218) ====
Sancho did not completely abandon his policy towards the crusade because of the setbacks at the Lateran. There was a concerted effort by the houses of Toulouse and Aragon to restore their shaken authority in Provence at the same time as Raymond Berengar IV came of age and Sancho's second administration of Provence ended. Count Raymond VI of Toulouse, who had been deprived of his lands by the Lateran council, was granted refuge by Sancho. In April 1216, King Philip II of France formally granted Raymond's fiefs to Simon de Montfort. Raymond tried during the spring of 1216 to recruit knights in Aragon and Catalonia in order to fight for him in Provence. Encouraged by a letter from King Frederick II of Germany, emperor-elect, (Note: As elected king of Germany, Frederick was also ruler of the kingdom of Arles; he would not be crowned emperor until 1220.) Raymond besieged Beaucaire in June.

On 12 June 1216 Sancho signed a treaty at Balaguer in Aragon with representatives of the rectors of the Confraternity of the Holy Spirit of Marseille, a pious lay association that was the de facto government of the city. The signatories agreed to aid one another in the case of any aggression by a third party. In September 1216, with Sancho's support and probably with a following of Catalan and Aragonese knights, Raymond of Toulouse invaded France to reclaim the county of Toulouse. Simon de Montfort was killed in 1218 at the ensuing siege of Toulouse.

On 26 October 1216 at Barcelona, Sancho and Nuño signed a peace treaty with Guillem Ramon de Montcada, the viscount of Béarn, his son Guillem and Guillem de Cervera. This treaty was a response to Petronilla of Bigorre's marriage to Guy de Montfort, which the viscount of Béarn considered a threatening move. The newfound allies invaded Bigorre and as a result Simon de Montfort lifted his siege of Lourdes, temporarily removing the threat the crusade posed to western flank of the Aragonese sphere.

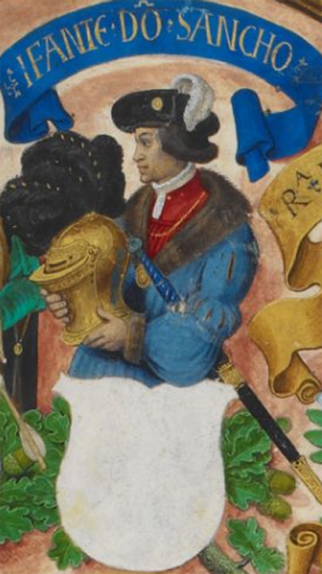
Sancho depicted in the late medieval Genealogia dos Reis de Portugal (1530–34), now manuscript BL Add MS 12531

Sancho's policy of intervention in Occitania was opposed by a faction of Aragonese nobles led by his nephew, Ferdinand, abbot of Montearagón, and by those who wished to make peace with the Papacy. Ferdinand even encouraged local rebellions in Huesca, Jaca and Zaragoza. In two bulls dated 28 and 29 December 1217, Pope Honorius III threatened to excommunicate James and Sancho, respectively, and to authorise a crusade against their realm if they did not abandon Raymond VI's cause. Under pressure from several sides and apparently unwilling to abandon the Toulousain alliance, Sancho stepped down as regent.

On 8 September 1218, Sancho signed an agreement with James which formally terminated the regency. He agreed to keep peace with the king and in exchange the king granted him lands and revenues: 15,000 solidi from five castles in Aragon and 10,000 solidi from Barcelona and Vilafranca. James also promised not to attack his lands or to permit anyone else from doing so for a period of seven years. This last clause secured James's neutrality in the event that Sancho continued to fight the Crusaders. The historian Ferran Soldevila considers Sancho's promise to keep the peace an indication that his resignation was not wholly voluntary.

Shortly after his resignation, in the same month of September 1218, Sancho was present at the assembly in Lleida, where he was named as one of the king's advisers when James confirmed the privileges of Montpellier, which he had inherited from his mother. This same assembly appointed Guillem IV de Cervera as procurator in Sancho's place.

== Marriages and children ==
Sometime before 1184, Sancho married Ermessenda, daughter of Geoffrey I of Rocabertí and Ermessenda de Vilademuls. In 1185, he married Sancha Núñez de Lara, daughter of Count Nuño Pérez de Lara and Teresa Fernández de Traba, and thus a step-daughter of King Ferdinand II of León. By her he had his only known son, Nuño Sánchez.

== Notes ==
Preceded by Raymond Berengar III	Count of Provence; 1181–1185	Succeeded by Alfonso II
Preceded by Raymond Berengar III	Count of Cerdanya c.1175–1189	Succeeded by Nuño
Vacant Title last held by Girard II	Count of Roussillon; 1208–1212	Succeeded by Nuño
