= Centule III of Bigorre =

French aristocrat

Centule III (French: Centulle; died 1178) was the Count of Bigorre from 1163 until his death. He was the eldest son of Beatrice II and Peter of Marsan and succeeded his mother in Bigorre on her death.

In 1170 he became a vassal of Alfonso II of Aragon in return for receiving the Val d'Aran in full. Under his watch the communal movement began to sweep Bigorre, but he avoided violent confrontations by granting the towns of his realm charters. The first charter was granted to Bagnères in 1171.

== Personal life ==
In 1155 Centule had married Matelle de Baux, and left one child, a daughter, Beatrice III of Bigorre, who passed Bigorre and the Viscounty of Marsan, which Centule had inherited from his father, to Bernard IV of Comminges.

== Sources ==
- Bisson, T. N. The Medieval Crown of Aragon: A Short History. Oxford: Clarendon Press, 1986. ISBN 0-19-821987-3. For Centule, see p. 37.

| Preceded by Beatrice II | Count of Bigorre; 1163–1178 | Succeeded by Beatrice III |
