= William I of Béarn =

Viscount of Béarn from 1171 to 1173

William I, called Guillem de Montcada II, was the Viscount of Béarn from 1171 to 1173 with opposition.

William was the eldest son of Guillem Ramon de Montcada I (ca). William first appears in 1150, witnessing his father's settlement at Arles with the House of Baux after Raymond Berengar IV of Barcelona's invasion of Provence. William thereafter appears regularly in the documents of his father.

On 10 June 1164, a document bears the name of Guillelmi de Monte Catano as husband of Mary, though this document's authenticity has been called into question. In 1168, William was holding the castle of Pau, probably through his marriage, even though Sancho VI of Navarre laid claim to it. The king tried to ally with Alfonso II of Aragon against William, but instead found himself at war with the Aragonese. In 1171, Alfonso granted all the lands formerly held by Talesa of Aragon to William. In Jaca, in 1170, Mary, having succeeded her defunct brother Gaston V, accepted Alfonso's grant of protection and did homage. She also agreed not to remarry without Alfonso's consent. In March 1171, William did homage for Béarn.

According to tradition, however, the Catalan was not acceptable to the Bearnese noblesse, which promptly rebelled. They elected Theobald of the neighbouring County of Bigorre as their viscount, but, as he did not respect the Fors de Bearn, they executed him within the year. They then selected a nobleman of the Auvergne, Sentonge, who lasted two years in power before suffering the same sad fate at the hands of the nobles. Throughout this whole period, William planned to conquer Béarn, but never got around to actually launching any military expedition. In 1173, the year Sentonge was executed, Mary abandoned William with their two young twin sons and entered the monastery of Santa Cruz de Volvestre. The Bearnese, having rid themselves of three viscounts in as many years, sent a delegation to the monastery to request one of her sons to succeed to the viscounty. Mary consented and sent the elder, Gaston. The younger son, William Raymond, inherited Béarn from his brother many years later.

Setting this traditional, probably legendary account, aside, it is likely that William's eldest son Gaston VI inherited Béarn on Mary's death in 1173. William no longer had a direct hand in government after that.

== Sources ==
- Shideler, John C. (1983). "Guillem Ramon [II], The 'Great Seneschal' ". A medieval Catalan noble family: The Montcadas, 1000-1230. Berkeley: University of California Press. pp. 87–113. ISBN 9780520045781 – via The Library of Iberian Resources Online.

Preceded by Mary	Viscount of Béarn; 1171 – 1173	Succeeded by Gaston VI
