= William II of Béarn =

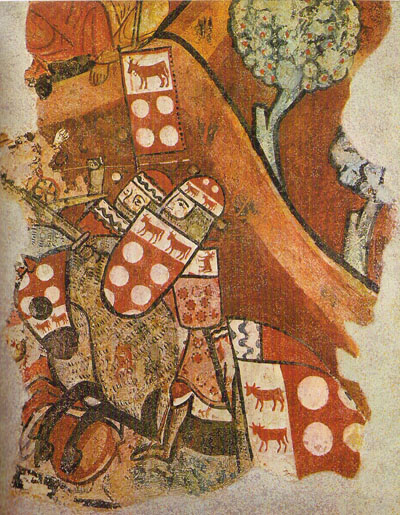
Guillem II in a fresco on the walls of the house once belonging to Berenguer d'Aguilar de Barcelona. His shield shows a combination of the arms of Montcada and those of Béarn.

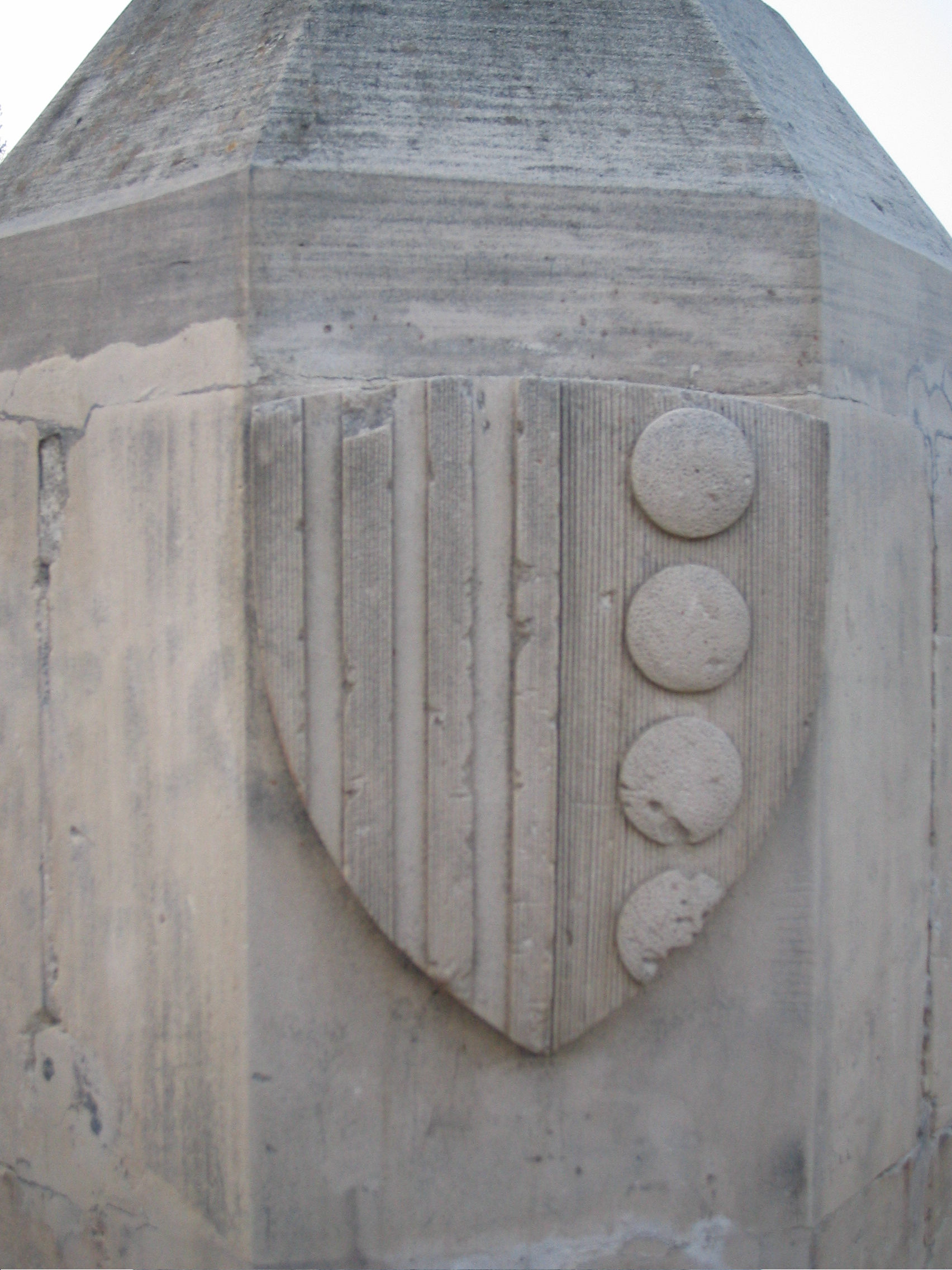
The Montcada arms marshalled with the bars of Aragon on a monument near where Guillermo and his nephew, Ramón, died in combat during the conquest of Majorca.

William II or William-Raymond (died 1229) was, from 1224 until his death, Lord of Montcada and Castellví de Rosanes (in Catalonia) and, as Guillermo II, Viscount of Bearn, of Marsan, of Gabardan and of Brulhois (in the southwest of present-day France). He was the son of Guillem Ramon de Montcada and Guilleuma de Castellvell.

The main thrust of his policy was the affairs of the Aragonese court, in which several families vied for influence over the young King James I. In particular, he was involved in the preparation for the invasion of the Balearic Islands.

In his last visit to Bearn, in February 1228, he promised the representative of the King of England that he would pay the latter homage throughout his lands in Aquitaine (Bearn, Gabardan, Brulhois and Captieux). This act marked the departure of Bearn from within the Aragonese domain and the start of its progressive submission to England.

Back in Catalonia, he played a leading role in the council held in Salou which planned the conquest of Majorca. In September 1229 the fleet left for Majorca, with Guillermo commanding the first ship. The troops having landed, they engaged in the battle of Portopí, thus beginning the conquest of Majorca. The crew had faced little difficulty when they landed on the 12 September. However, Guillermo was killed, along with eight knights of his family, including his nephew Ramon de Moncada in the Sierra de Na Burguesa (Calvia). In the division following the conquest of the island by the Crown of Aragon, the municipality of Costitx was given to Guillermo II de Bearn and thus passed to his heirs.

His mausoleum is in the church of the Monastery of Santes Creus.

== Descendants ==
Guillem Ramon de Moncada had two children with his wife Garsenda, daughter of Alfonso II, Count of Provence and Garsenda de Folcarquier. They had:

- Gastón, who succeeded him in 1229
- Constanza de Béarn, who married Diego López III de Haro, Lord of Vizcaya.

== Sources ==
- Howell, Margaret (2001). Eleanor of Provence: Queenship in Thirteenth-Century England. Blackwell Publishers.
- Smith, Damian J. (2010). Crusade, Heresy and Inquisition in the Lands of the Crown of Aragon (c. 1167). BRILL. ISBN 9789004182899.

Preceded by: Guillermo I	Viscount of Béarn, Gabardan and Brulhois; 1224-1229	Succeeded by: Gastón VII
