= Centule II of Bigorre =

Centule II (also Centulle) (died 1129) was the Count of Bigorre from 1114 to his death. He established feudal bonds across the Pyrenees with Aragon. He was also a major participant in the Crusades, fighting in the army of Raymond of Saint-Gilles, and the Reconquista.

He was the second son of Centule V of Béarn by his second wife, Beatrice I of Bigorre. He succeeded his elder brother Bernard III's daughter Beatrice II. His elder half-brother Gaston IV was the viscount of Béarn and the two maintained excellent fraternal relations, undertaking almost every military expedition jointly.

Between 1095 and 1101, the two half-brothers were absent from the south of France on the First Crusade. While Gaston was one of the heroes of the Crusade and consequently finds mention in many chronicles, Centule had not yet succeeded his brother at that point and was a mere nobleman, without a fief.

In 1113, Bernard died and his successor, the heiress Beatrice, followed him to the grave the next year. Centule, now armed with the forces of Bigorre behind him, joined Gaston in an alliance with Alfonso the Battler, King of Aragon and Navarre, on the successful expedition against Zaragoza in 1118. For his part in the victory, Centule received a section of the city in fief of the king and twenty four villages in the Val d'Aran. He participated in the conquest of Tudela in 1119 and in the great attack on Granada in 1125–1126. In May 1122, he rendered homage to Alfonso for land he held across the Pyrenees.

Centule married Estefania, daughter of Ramon Berenguer III, Count of Barcelona, and Dolça de Gévaudaun. They had one daughter:

- Beatrice II (or III) de Bigorre (d. after 7 February 1148)

Centule died in 1129 and was succeeded by his daughter who was married to Pierre de Marsan. With this marriage she united the county of Bigorre and the viscounty of Marsan.

== Sources ==
Preceded by Beatrice II	Count of Bigorre; 1114–1129	Succeeded by Beatrice III
