= Siege of Bayonne (1130–1131) =

1130–1131 siege

Coordinates: 43°20′N 1°28′W

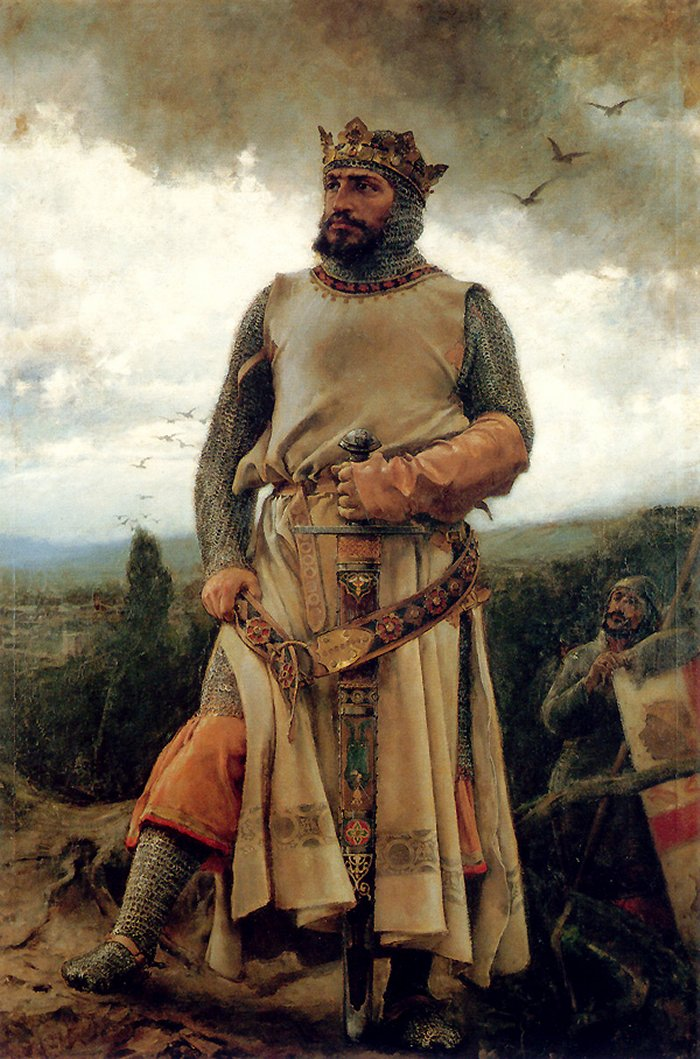
- Romantic portrayal of Alfonso, the warrior-king, by Francisco Pradilla (1879)
| Date | October 1130 – October 1131 |
| Location | Bayonne, Aquitaine |
| Result | Siege lifted |

Belligerents
| Kingdom of Aragon–Navarre; County of Bigorre; Viscounty of Béarn | Duchy of Aquitaine; County of Toulouse |

Commanders and leaders
| Alfonso the Battler; Pedro González de Lara†; Centule II of Bigorre; Gaston IV of Béarn | Alfonso Jordan |

Strength
| Unknown | Unknown |

The siege of Bayonne was launched by Alfonso the Battler, King of Aragon and Navarre, apparently against the Duke of Aquitaine, William X, and lasted from October 1130 to October 1131. The city of Bayonne was then a part of Aquitaine, nominally a part of France. The chief narrative source for the siege of Bayonne is the Chronica Adefonsi imperatoris, a contemporary account of events in Spain compiled to celebrate the feats of Alfonso VII of León and Castile. The siege began with knights, infantry, and siege engines and included the plundering of the environs of the city and assaults on its walls. The arrival of a relief army led to a famous joust and the prolongation of the siege. The siege was a failure, and was lifted after Alfonso had made his famous last will and testament.

The primary sources are insufficient to fully explain the purposes behind Alfonso's siege, but historians are unanimous in attributing his actions to his ongoing conflict with his western neighbour, Alfonso VII, hero of the aforementioned Chronica. The latter had concluded an alliance with Alfonso's eastern neighbour, Raymond Berengar III of Barcelona, by marrying his daughter, Berengaria, in 1127. This may have prompted Alfonso to make an attack on Raymond's allies north of the Pyrenees in an effort to scuttle Raymond's political aspirations there, for Raymond was an ally of the Duke of Aquitaine. At the same time the Count of Toulouse, Alfonso Jordan, had done homage to Alfonso VII upon his succession in 1126. In March that year, with Suero Vermúdez, he had even taken the capital city of León from some rebels holding out in favour of an illegitimate half-brother of Alfonso VII, one of the sons of his mother, Queen Urraca, and her lover, Pedro González de Lara. Urraca's second, childless marriage was to Alfonso the Battler. For a period of over a decade the two had been engaged in a civil war for power in Castile and León. With the death of Urraca, Alfonso VII, her son by an earlier marriage, succeeded to her position as primary rival of Alfonso the Battler for the rule of these two kingdoms. In besieging Bayonne, Alfonso the Battler was perhaps hoping to persuade the Count of Toulouse to switch allegiance to him and aid him in his war in Castile.

The attacking army was probably already passing through the Pyrenees when, on 4 September 1130, Alfonso visited a chapel in Ardanés, a now depopulated village in the Valle de Hecho. The army probably crossed via the pass at Somport in order to enter Gascony through the allied territory of Béarn. The first direct reference to the siege dates from 26 October 1130, when Alfonso issued a fuero to the town of Corella from Bayonne, called "the fortress of Bayonne" (illo castello de Baiona). It had begun shortly before 16 October, if both the Chronica and the obituary of Burgos Cathedral are accurate. The former records how Pedro González de Lara, after he was captured by Alfonso VII for his part in the rebellion, joined the siege of Bayonne "in order to bring him [Alfonso the Battler] back to Castile" (ut reducere eum in Castellam) because he wanted "to wage war in Castile" (facere bellum in Castella), that is, continue the revolt. While Pedro's capture occurred in June, his death at the siege did not occur until 16 October, according to the obituary of Burgos, where he is buried.

According to the Chronica, "during the time when Alfonso was at war with the rebel nobles ... the King of Aragon had mobilised sizeable armies of knights and infantrymen ... had traveled then beyond his own borders to Gascony [where] he surrounded the city of Bayonne which is located near the Garonne River." It subsequently relates how for several days he plundered the countryside around Bayonne before assaulting the city's walls with siege engines brought from Aragon. At some point a relief army led by Alfonso Jordan, count of Toulouse, arrived. Pedro, for reasons unknown, challenged him to a joust. In the words of the Chronica: "Count Pedro asked the Count of Toulouse for single combat" (comes Petrus petiit comiti Tolosano singulare certamen), "both went out to fight much like two strong lions" (sicut duo leones fortes), and "Count Pedro was wounded by Alfonso's lance and, falling from his horse, broke his arm and died a few days later" (et vulneratus est comes Petrus ab hasta comitis Adefonsi et, cadens de equo, fractum est brachium eius et post paucos dies mortuus est). Alfonso was apparently unharmed. It is possible that Pedro González was in the company of Alfonso's mother, Elvira of Castile, Countess of Toulouse, when the young future count of Toulouse was brought back to Europe from Outremer. In any case they shared a history going back at least to the disputed succession of Alfonso VII.

In his trans-Pyrenean expedition, the Aragonese king's allies were Gaston IV of Béarn and Centule II of Bigorre. Besides the aforementioned knights, infantry, and siege engines, Alfonso also blockaded the city with ships on the river Adour. The siege dragged on, however, and during his year-long absence from Spain, Alfonso the Battler lost Castrojeriz and the other places he held in Castile west of the Sierra de la Demanda to Alfonso VII. The Aragonese king himself remained at the siege throughout the end of 1130, as charters he issued on 19 November and in December indicate. He continued to be "about Bayonne" (super Baiona) from January to May 1131, as both royal and private documents say. The siege continued through the summer, but in July and August Alfonso was leading forces in a place called Rocha Tallata or Rocathalada, possibly modern Peyrehorade. While still besieging Bayonne (in obsessione Baione), Alfonso drafted his will in October 1131: it contains the last datable reference to the siege. This will was later confirmed at Sariñena on 4 September 1134. When the siege was lifted is not known, but most of November 1131 must have been spent returning, by way of the Camino de Santiago, to Aragon. In December the royal court was at Tiermas.
