= Ars musica =

Ars Musica or Ars musica may refer to:

- ars musica, Latin expression meaning 'musical art', one of the seven liberal arts
- Ars musica (Lambertus), Latin treatise on music theory from the late 13th century
- Ars musica (Juan Gil de Zamora), treatise on music theory by Juan Gil de Zamora written in Latin
- Ars Musica (album), 2013 album by Spanish power metal band Dark Moor
- Ars Musica (festival), contemporary music international festival that takes place in Brussels, Belgium

== See also ==
- Ars musicae
