= County of Bigorre =

Small feudatory of the Duchy of Gascony in the ninth to fifteenth centuries

Coat of arms of the county of Bigorre

The County of Bigorre was a small feudatory of the Duchy of Gascony in the 9th through 15th centuries. Its capital was Tarbes.

The county was constituted out of the dowry of Faquilène, an Aquitainian princess, for her husband Donatus Lupus I, the son of Lupus III of Gascony. The original Bigorre was considerable in size, but successive generations, following on Gascon traditions, gave out portions as appanages to younger sons. The county lost Lavedan, Aster, Aure, and Montaner in the first two generations.

The original dynasty died out in Bigorre in the 11th century, the county passing to the House of Foix and then that of Béarn. In the 12th century, it went to the house of Marsan and then of Comminges and in the thirteenth to that of Montfort. It was briefly in the hands of the Armagnacs and passed between English and French suzerainty during the Hundred Years' War before finally being recovered by the French. In the 15th century, it fell to the House of Foix again and thence to the crown in an exchange of properties.

== List of counts of Bigorre ==
Ruler	Dates	Gascon line	Notes
Donatus Lupus I	840–?	Bigorre line	
Lupus I	?–910	Bigorre line	Son of the predecessor.
Donatus Lupus II	910–930	Bigorre line	Son of the predecessor.
Raymond I Donatus	930–?	Bigorre line	Son of the predecessor.
Arnold	?–980	Bigorre line	Son of the predecessor.
García Lupus	980–1030	Bigorre line	Son of the predecessor.
Gersenda	1030–1038	Bigorre line	Daughter of the predecessor, married Bernard Roger of Foix.
Bernard I Roger	1030–1034	Foix line	Daughter of the predecessor, married Bernard Roger of Foix.
Bernard II	1038–1077	Foix line	Son of the predecessors.
Raymond II	1077–1080	Foix line	Son of the predecessor.
Beatrice I	1080–1095	Foix line	Sister of the predecessor, married Centule of Béarn.
Centule I the Young	1080–1090	Béarn line	Sister of the predecessor, married Centule of Béarn.
Bernard III	1095–1113	Béarn line	Son of the predecessors.
Centule II	1113–1130	Béarn line	Son of the predecessor.
Beatrice II	1130–1156	Béarn line	Daughter of the predecessor, married Peter of Marsan.
Peter I	1130–1156	Marsan line	Daughter of the predecessor, married Peter of Marsan.
Centule III	1156–1178	Marsan line	Son of the predecessors.
Stephanie-Beatrice III	1178–1194	Marsan line	Daughter of the predecessor, married Bernard of Comminges. They were separated in 1192
Bernard IV of Comminges	1180–1192	Comminges line	Daughter of the predecessor, married Bernard of Comminges. They were separated in 1192
Petronilla	1194–1251	Comminges line	Daughter of the predecessors, in her long countship she married various nobles: 1196–1214 Gaston VI, Viscount of Béarn; 1215–1216 Nuño Sánchez of Aragon; 1216–1220 Guy de Montfort; 1221–1224 Aimeric of Racon; 1224–1247 Boso of Matha (Mastas)

=== House of Montfort ===
- 1251–1256 Alice with her second husband
  - 1251–1256 Raoul of Courtenay

=== House of Chabanais ===
- 1256–1283 Esquivat
- 1283–1302 Laura

After this point the succession became disputed and whether the county owes allegiance to England or France was also fought over. In 1360, the Treaty of Brétigny made it decisively French. In 1407, it belonged to Bernard VII of Armagnac, who sold it that year to John I, Count of Foix. From then on it is a subsidiary title of the counts of Foix.
