= Bertrand of L'Isle-Jourdain =

Bertrand of L'Isle-Jourdain may refer to:

- Bertrand of Comminges (c. 1050–1123), a native of L'Isle-Jourdain, bishop of Comminges
- Bertrand de L'Isle-Jourdain (1227–1286), a native of L'Isle-Jourdain, bishop of Toulouse
- Bertrand I of L'Isle-Jourdain (died c. 1349), count of L'Isle-Jourdain
- Bertrand II of L'Isle-Jourdain (died 1369), count of L'Isle-Jourdain
