= Laure of Chabanais =

French noblewoman (died 1316)

Laure of Chabanais (died 1316) was a Countess regnant suo jure of Bigorre in 1283 to 1307.

Her parents were Alice, Countess of Bigorre and Jordan, Lord of Chabanais.

She married firstly to Simon of Rochechouart, lord of Availles, and secondly to Raymond V Viscount of Turenne. She had three children, all by her first marriage.

After the death of her childless brother Eskivat de Chabanais she fought with her Aunt Martha, Viscountess of Marsan, wife of Gaston VII, Viscount of Béarn, for control of Bigorre.
