= Alice of Montfort =

French noblewoman

Alice of Montfort (French: Alix; 1217/1220–1255) was, in her own right, the countess of Bigorre between 1251 and 1255.

She was the eldest daughter of Countess Petronilla of Bigorre and her third husband Guy of Monfort.

== Life ==
Alice was born sometime between 1217 and 1220. She was the eldest child of her mother Countess Petronilla of Bigorre and Guy of Monfort. She had one full sister also named Petronilla, who went on to marry Ralph of la Roche-Tesson. Her mother was married five times, her elder two daughters were the product of her third marriage.

Her mother's fifth marriage to Boson of Mastas, lord of Cognac, produced a half-sister named Martha, who married Viscount Gaston VII of Béarn. Alice was cared for by her uncle, Amalric of Montfort, when her mother remarried.

By the time of Petronilla's fifth marriage and the birth of her daughter Martha, she required a stronger union so arranged for Alice to marry Jordan, lord of Chabanais, a relative of Boson of Mastas. An agreement was reached that upon Petronilla's death, Alice and Jordan would inherit Bigorre, whilst Martha would inherit her father's lands of Mastas. By 1247, Jordan had died and the widowed Alice was left with the care of their three children.

Alice married for a second time to Ralph of Courtenay during 1247. The couple had a daughter named Matilda, who later married Philip of Chieti.

=== Reign ===
In 1251, Petronilla died. She had passed control of the government to Simon de Montfort, 6th Earl of Leicester, Alice's uncle. Simon had interpreted this act as a gift, so refused to hand Bigorre over to Alice on the death of her mother.

Alice and her husband appealed to her half-sister Martha and her husband, Gaston VII of Béarn, to help re-claim Bigorre and they agreed to help her. To prevent Guyenne and Gascony from rebelling, Henry III of England recalled Simon de Montfort and appointed John Grailly in his place. However, Alice and her family re-claimed Bigorre during 1251.

Alice reigned for the next four years, dying in 1255. She was succeeded by her eldest son, Eskivat de Chabanais. Following Alice's death, Simon did attempt to challenge her son for control of Bigorre once again.

Upon Eskivat's death, control of Bigorre was disputed between Alice's sister Martha and her daughter Laura, with the latter eventually succeeding.

== Issue ==
The marriage between Alice and Jordan produced three children:

- Eskivat de Chabanais (died 1283), succeeded his mother, married Mascarós II d'Armagnac, Countess of Armagnac and Fézensac but had no children.
- Jordan (died before 1283), named as heir to his brother but predeceased him
- Laura de Chabanais (c.1240-1316), fought with her aunt Martha for control of Bigorre on the death of her brother. Married firstly to Simon of Rochechouart, lord of Availles, and secondly to Viscount Raymond V of Turenne. Laura had three children, all by her first marriage.
