= Theobald of Béarn =

Theobald (died 1171) was the Viscount of Béarn in the French Pyrenees in 1171. He was from Bigorre. The story of his succession to Béarn is probably not reliable and is likely a later invention.

In 1171, the nobles of Béarn repudiated William of Montcada, the choice of their lord Alfonso II of Aragon to be their viscount through marriage to the heiress Mary. The nobles asked Theobald to be their ruler, but he did not abide by the Fors de Bearn and was executed soon after he took up power. The nobles replaced him with Sentonge.

Preceded by William I	Viscount of Béarn; 1171	Succeeded by Sentonge
