= Bernard IV =

Bernard IV may refer to:

- Bernard IV, Count of Armagnac 1160–1188
- Bernard IV, Lord of Lippe (c. 1230–1275)
- Bernard IV Jordan of L'Isle-Jourdain (died 1340)
- Bernard IV, Margrave of Baden-Durlach (1517–1553)
