= Roger-Bernard III of Foix =

Count of Foix, co-prince of Andorra

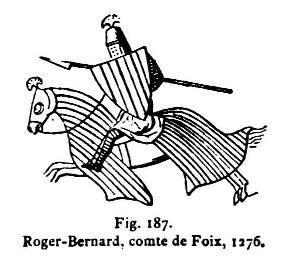
Roger-Bernard III in 1276

The coat of arms Roger-Bernard adopted after his inheritance of Béarn in 1290.

Roger-Bernard III (1243 – 3 March 1302) was the Count of Foix from 1265 to his death. He was the son of Roger IV of Foix and Brunissende of Cardona. He entered into conflicts with both Philip III of France and Peter III of Aragon, who held him in captivity for a time. He was nevertheless a distinguished poet and troubadour.

== Conflict with Philip III ==
His conflict with Philip III was rooted in the longstanding desire of the French monarchy to establish its authority in Languedoc, where, since the 10th century, it had been practically a dead letter. In 1272, Roger-Bernard allied with Gerald VI, Count of Armagnac to attack the lord of Sompuy, who, however, applied for protection to the king. This brought the king and the count into direct opposition. Ignoring the royal command, the two counts went to war. Philip, claiming rights as the heir of his uncle Alfonso of Poitou, invaded Languedoc at the head of a large army. Roger-Bernard fled to his castle at Foix and the Seneschal of Toulouse, Eustache de Beaumarchès, seized his lands.

Roger-Bernard, meanwhile, placed himself under the competing protection of James I of Aragon, who endeavoured to negotiate a peace. Roger-Bernard, however, demanded harsh and unacceptable conditions. On 3 June, King Philip began the siege of Foix and on 5 June, the citadel fell by the work of the sappers in tearing down its defensive walls. Roger-Bernard surrendered and was carted off to prison in Carcassonne.

The dispute between James and Philip, however, did not immediately abate. The former refused to relinquish what he held on behalf of the imprisoned count. On 8 February 1273, the conflict was resolved and the king of Aragon gave up his claims. Before the end of that year, the count of Foix was released and did homage to the king of France, receiving back a portion of his confiscated lands. Roger-Bernard's relationship with Philip III was thereafter solid, with Philip even considering him his "most loyal and faithful vassal" in December 1277.

== War of the Navarrese Succession ==
On the death of Henry I of Navarre in 1274, a dispute arose over the succession to that small kingdom. Henry's heir was his daughter Joanna, wife of Philip the Fair, then heir-apparent of Philip III. The Aragonese, however, opposed her succession, which would have put the French in control of Navarre. In order to secure Joanna and Philip's rightful inheritance, Roger-Bernard led a French army into Navarre in September 1276. He took the capital city of Pamplona by force and razed it. In gladful compensation for this, Philip III restored all the count's remaining territories south of the Pas de La Barre.

== Formation of Andorra ==
Perhaps the most lasting of Roger-Bernard's policies was his diplomatic agreement with the bishop of Urgell concerning the possession of Andorra, a small mountain landlocked territory with a long history of quarrels over its lordship between bishop and count. On 8 September 1278, after long negotiations, the count and the bishop concluded a paréage, a form of condominium, over the disputed country. Though slightly modified a little later (the same year), the paréage remains the governing system of Andorra to this day, though the office of Count of Foix has devolved to the Presidency of France since that time.

== Conflict with Aragon ==
In Spring 1280, the long-stewing conflict between Roger-Bernard and Peter of Aragon broke out into open rebellion. The count of Foix formed a coalition of other dissatisfied Catalan nobles, including Arnold Roger I of Pallars Sobirà and Ermengol X of Urgell, and revolted against Peter. Besieged in Balaguer, he was forced to surrender on 22 July and was imprisoned. While the other leaders of the revolt were released the next year, Roger-Bernard languished in an Aragonese dungeon until December 1283, at which time it was politically expedient to free him in exchange for the viscounty of Castelbon in an effort to stave off French aggression in the form of the so-called "Aragonese Crusade."

Roger-Bernard, however, was not beholden to the then-excommunicate king of Aragon and readily sided with the invading French. First, on 25 May 1285, Elne and then, on 7 September, Girona surrendered to their French besiegers, Raimond-Roger, brother of the Count of Pallars Sobirà, negotiating the surrenders with the count of Foix.

== Relationship with Philip IV ==
In 1290, Roger-Bernard tried to stop the seneschals of Toulouse and Carcassonne from interfering in his internal affairs, such as the administration of justice and the collection of taxes. Philip IV, now King of France, refused to call off his functionaries and diminish his own authority in the south and was thus forced to confiscate two of the count's castles as punishment for his disobedience and lack of cooperation with the crown. Nonetheless, in 1293, the king finally intervened to order the seneschal of Carcassonne to leave the count of Foix's matters to the count of Foix. In 1295, Philip made the count Governor of Gascony and, on 29 April, ordered the seneschal to return the confiscated castles of 1290.

In 1295, Roger-Bernard alleged that the seneschal was levying taxes without his consent or permission to finance the war with England. As a means of paying the count back for these imposts, Philip granted him castles in July 1295 and 1298.

In 1297, he was one of the three commanders of the French army under Robert II, Count of Artoiss which defeated the English army of Henry de Lacy, Earl of Lincoln at the Battle of Bonnegarde, during the Gascon War.

When Bernard Saisset, bishop of Pamiers, was inciting the people of Toulouse to revolt, it was to Roger-Bernard that he went looking for a leader. He was refused and the count informed the king.

== Inheritance of Béarn ==
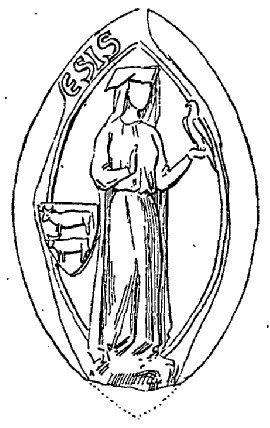
Margaret of Montcada

In 1252, Roger-Bernard married Margaret of Béarn (also called Margaret of Montcada), the daughter of Gaston VII of Béarn and Martha of Marsan. In his will, Gaston declared Margaret to be his heir, which was generally accepted, though not by his second daughter Mathe and her husband Gerard VI of Armagnac. Later, Gaston declared his third daughter Guillemette the new heir, but when he died in 1290, Roger-Bernard immediately took possession of his counties (May). Roger-Bernard then divided his coat of arms between that of Foix and that of Béarn.

In 1293, after three years of peace, Gerard V finally contested the usurpation of Béarn and began a long war with Roger-Bernard over the rights of their wives. This war lasted until 1377.

When the aforementioned Guillemette donated all her Catalan lands to James II of Aragon in April 1300, Roger-Bernard opposed her and traveled at the head of troops through the pass of the Col de Puymorens in the Pyrenees. He died at Tarascon-sur-Ariège on 3 March 1302 and was buried in Boulbonne beside his ancestors.

Roger-Bernard and Margaret had:

- Gaston I, his successor
- Constance, married (1296) John I de Lévis, lord of Mirepoix
- Mathe, married (1294) Bernard IV of Astarac
- Margaret (died 1304), married (1291) Bernard IV Jordan of L'Isle-Jourdain
- Brunissende, married (1298) Elias VII of Périgord

== Sources ==
- Aurell, Martin (2017). The Lettered Knight: Knowledge and Aristocratic Behaviour in the Twelfth and Thirteenth Centuries. Central University Press.
- Biller, Peter; Bruschi, C.; Sneddon, S., eds. (2011). Inquisitors and Heretics in Thirteenth-Century Languedoc:Edition and Translation of Toulouse Inquisition Depositions, 1273-1282. Brill.
- Blanks, David R. (1993). "Regionalism in Medieval Languedoc: The Pays de Sabartès". Historical Reflections / Réflexions Historiques. 19 (Spring): 209–228.
- Firnhaber-Baker, Justine (2014). Violence and the State in Languedoc, 1250–1400. Cambridge University Press.
- Lodge, Eleanor C. (1926). Gascony under English Rule. Methuen & Co. Ltd.
- Viader, Roland (2003). L'Andorre du IXe au XIVe siècle: montagne, féodalité et communautés. Presses Universitairies du Mirail.

Preceded by Roger IV	Count of Foix; 1265–1302	Succeeded by Gaston I & VIII
New title	Prince of Andorra; 1278–1302 with Pere d'Urtx (1278–1293); Guillem de Montcada (1295–1302)	Succeeded by Gaston I & VIII
Preceded by Gaston VII	Viscount of Béarn; 1290–1302	Succeeded by Gaston I & VIII
