= Margaret of Béarn =

European noblewoman (1245–1250 – c. 1319)

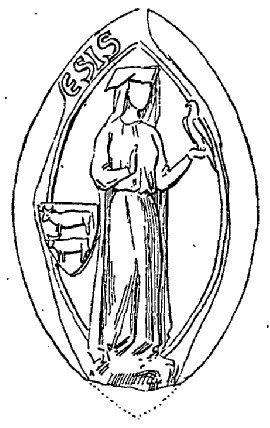
- Early tribute to Margaret
- Born: c. 1245–1250
- Died: c. 1319
- Other names: Margaret of Montcada, Marguerite of Montcada
- Occupations: Viscountess, Countess
- Spouse: Roger-Bernard III of Foix (1240 – 1303)
- Children: Gaston I, Constance, Mathe, Marguerite, Brunissende
- Parents: Gaston VII, Viscount of Béarn (1225 – 1290) (father); Martha, Viscountess of Marsan, and Countess of Bigorre (mother)

Margaret of Béarn – also known as Margaret or Marguerite of Montcada (c. 1245–1250 – c. 1319) was a noblewoman, who ruled (with her husband or for her son) lands near the Pyrenees mountains and in the southwestern part of present-day France. When her father died in 1290, she inherited the lands, assets and title, Viscountess of Béarn. In 1310 following the death of her sister, she inherited the assets and title of Countess of Bigorre.

== Brief heritage ==
Margaret was the second-born daughter of Gaston VII, Viscount of Béarn and Martha, Viscountess of Marsan, who, in turn, was a daughter of Boson of Marsan, Count of Bigorre, and Petronilla, Countess of Bigorre. Her father, Gaston VII of Béarn, was the son of William II, Viscount of Béarn, and his wife, Garsenda, daughter of Alfonso II of Provence and Garsenda of Forcalquier.

== Marriage ==
Margaret's wedding contract was arranged when she was only about seven years old. It was signed in Layrac, France in October 1252, and said she was intended to marry the count Roger-Bernard III of Foix, but the marriage didn't take place until fifteen years later, in 1267.

Roger-Bernard's new Foix-Béarn coat of arms that showed the houses that were joined with Margaret's marriage to him. The bars represent the House of Foix, the cows are for the House of Béarn.

The union was politically advantageous as it created a strong alliance between the House of Béarn and the House of Foix. From this marriage, Margaret bore five children.

- Gaston I, (1287 – 1315), who later inherited several titles including, Count of Foix, Co-Prince of Andorra, and (under a different name, Gaston VIII) Viscount of Béarn
- Constance, married in 1296 to John I de Lévis, Lord of Mirepoix
- Mathe, married in 1294 to Gerard VI of Armagnac
- Marguerite married in 1291 to Bernard IV Jordan of L'Isle-Jourdain. She died 1304
- Brunissende, married in 1298 to Elias VII of Périgord

== Viscountess and Countess ==
In 1290 when her father died, Margaret inherited substantial assets and was named the ruler and Viscountess of Béarn (a responsibility she shared with her husband), and she held that post until 1310 when she succeeded her sister Constance (who had, in turn, succeeded their mother) as Countess of Bigorre. She held that title until her death.

Béarn was not a straightforward succession. In his will, Margaret's father Gaston VII, first declared that Margaret was to be his heir, which was generally accepted, though not by her sister Mathe and her husband Gerard VI of Armagnac. Later, before he died, her father declared a different daughter Guillemette should be the new heir, but when Margaret's father died in 1290, her husband Roger-Bernard immediately, in her name, took possession of the lands. Then, in a show of dominance, Roger-Bernard changed the family's coat of arms to be a combination of designs from both Foix and Béarn. Roger-Bernard would continue to be an aggressive supporter of his wife's property claims for as long as he lived.

In 1293, after three years of peace, Margaret's brother-in-law (Mathe's husband) Gerard VI finally contested the property of Béarn and began a long war with Roger-Bernard over the rights of the sisters who were their wives. With the death of Roger-Bernard in 1303, Margaret became Foix's regent for his successor, her 13-year-old son, Gaston I, Count of Foix, until he reached the age of majority.

== Sources ==
- Johnston, Mark, ed. (2009). Medieval Conduct Literature: An Anthology of Vernacular Guides to Behaviour for Youths. Medieval Academy of America.
- Lodge, Eleanor C. (1926). Gascony under English Rule. Methuen & Co. Ltd.
- Viader, Roland (2003). L'Andorre du IXe au XIVe siècle: montagne, féodalité et communautés. Presses Universitairies du Mirail.
