= Montcada =

Montcada may refer to:

- Montcada i Reixac, municipality containing the town of Montcada, near Barcelona
- House of Montcada, aristocratic dynasty linked to Montcada i Reixac
- Margaret of Montcada viscountess of Béarn (from 1290 to 1310)
- Moncada, Valencia or Montcada, town near Valencia, Spain
