= Aymon II of Geneva =

Aymon II (died 1280) was the Count of Geneva from 1265. He was the son and heir of Count Rudolf, but died heirless himself and was succeeded by his brother Amadeus II. According to one modern historian, he was “overawed by the power of the count of Savoy”, and did little during his fifteen-year reign to recover the lands and jurisdictions lost to the Savoyards by his father and grandfather.

In 1279 Aymon married Constance, a daughter of Gaston VII of Béarn and viscountess in her own right of Marsan and Bigorre. The marriage was arranged by Gaston's second wife, “la Grande Dauphine” Beatrice, who as a daughter of Peter II of Savoy and widow of Guigues VII of Viennois, was related to two traditional rivals of the counts of Geneva. Constance was twice widowed herself, having been married very briefly to Alfonso, a son of James I of Aragon, and to Henry of Almain, son of Richard, King of Germany. She had no children with him.

Late in his life, Aymon may have become involved an anti-Angevin alliance under the auspices of the Crown of Aragon. In 1280, Peter III of Aragon (James's son), who had a claim on the Kingdom of Sicily, then ruled by an Angevin, sent a secretive message, "to treat of certain affairs", to several princes who were threatened by Angevin power in the County of Provence and the Piedmont. Dalmau de Villarasa, the ambassador bearing the letters, was accredited to, among others, the count of Geneva.

== Bibliography ==
- Cox, Eugene L. (1974). The Eagles of Savoy: The House of Savoy in Thirteenth-Century Europe. Princeton University Press.

| Preceded by Rudolf of Geneva | Count of Geneva; 1265–1280 | Succeeded by Amadeus II of Geneva |
