= Ars musicae =

Ars musicae (or Ars musice) may refer to:

- Ars musicae, treatise by Johannes de Grocheio
- Ars musicae, alternative title of Ars musica (Juan Gil de Zamora)
- Ars Musicae de Barcelona, Catalan ensemble for the performance of medieval music active between 1935 and 1979

== See also ==
- Ars musica
