= Gaston VI of Béarn =

Gaston VI (1173–1214), called the Good, was the Viscount of Béarn, Gabardan, and Brulhois from 1173. He was also Count of Bigorre and Viscount of Marsan through his marriage in 1196 to Petronilla, the daughter of Countess Stephanie-Beatrice of Bigorre.

Coat of arms of the Viscounts of Béarn from the 9th century, now in the mountains in southwest France

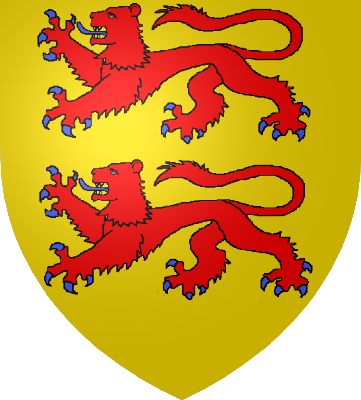
Coat of arms of Bigorre, now in southwest France.

The former lands of Foix, East of Béarn and Bigorre, Southwest of France.

Gaston was the son of ruling Viscountess Mary and William I of Béarn. He was the elder of twins, his younger brother being the later viscount William Raymond. After their birth, in light of the conflict in Béarn over the succession, Mary fled with them to the monastery of Santa Cruz de Volvestre. A Bearnese delegation reached the monastery in 1173 seeking one of the boys to be their viscount. Mary gave them Gaston, who was taken back to Béarn to rule.

During his minority, a council of regents from Aragon governed on his behalf. The council was led by Pelegrino de Castellarzuelo, lord of Barbastro. The period of the regency, however, is poorly documented. In 1184 he was given prisoners by his liege Henry II of England but later complained because he could not collect the ransom money and he had to pay the prisoners expenses. In 1187, when fourteen years old, Gaston was declared of age and paid homage to Alfonso II of Aragon at Huesca.

Like most of the baronage of southern France, Gaston did not participate in the Third Crusade, because of the grand conflict between the crown of Aragon on the one hand and the county of Toulouse on the other. Gaston was firmly in the Aragonese camp.

In 1194, a territorial dispute with the viscounty of Dax was resolved with the exchange of Mixe and Ostabarret, Ostabat, in return for the city of Orthez from Dax. In 1196, peace was also made with Soule. In that same year, he married Petronilla of Bigorre and thus made peace with all his neighbours.

In 1208, Pope Innocent III ordered the Albigensian Crusade against the Cathars in southern France. Innocent ordered Gaston not to intervene against the crusaders, but Gaston took part in the relief of Toulouse from the besieging army of Simon de Montfort, 5th Earl of Leicester in 1211. He also took part in the disastrous attack on Castelnaudary. However, neither of these acts were religiously based, as neither Béarn nor Bigorre had many Cathars, but grounded rather in his loyalty to Peter II of Aragon, who was forced to come to the protection of his other vassals attacked by the crusaders. Gaston was attacked by the crusade nevertheless. Gaston lost Brulhois and was excommunicated by the Council of Vabres and his territories declared forfeit by the pope.

On 15 January 1213, Gaston did homage to Peter II of Aragon along with Bernard IV of Comminges, (circa 1150 – Count 1175 – 22 February 1225), Raimond-Roger of Foix, and Raymond VI of Toulouse. Peter II thus intended to create a vast transpyrenean empire; however it was all undone at the Battle of Muret on 12 September. There Peter died in a losing cause because he had overconfidently neglected to summon his vassals with enough time for them all to arrive. Gaston was one of those who did not participate. Soon after the battle, however, Innocent III publicly pardoned the lords of Béarn and Comminges. The only penance imposed upon Gaston was to give to the bishop two of the districts of the city of Oloron. In return, he also received back Brulhois.

His loyalty to the king of Aragon, however, remained clearly expressed in the Llibre dels fets (chapt. 37). There he appears along with his brother at the side of the young king James I at the siege of Tamarite de Litera.

Gaston died without issue in 1214 and was succeeded by his brother William Raymond. His widow retained Bigorre.

== Notes ==
Preceded by Sentonge	Viscount of Béarn; 1173–1214	Succeeded by William Raymond
