= Juan Gil de Zamora =

Castilian Franciscan friar and prolific writer

Two historiated initials S and Q from a late 13th-century manuscript showing Juan Gil writing his Liber de preconiis Hyspanie (top) and presenting it to Sancho IV (bottom).

Juan Gil de Zamora (c. 1240 – c. 1320), known in Latin as Aegidius Zamorensis, was a Castilian Franciscan friar and prolific writer of the literary circle around Alfonso X. He wrote hagiography, history, music theory, natural science, poetry and sermons.

== Life ==
Juan was born in Zamora. His exact birth year is unknown, but is thought to be early as the 1220s on the basis of Gil González Dávila's claim that he served as a secretary to Ferdinand III. It has also been placed towards 1230. It was most likely around 1240, with the year 1241 having been proposed. This latter date is arrived at on the basis that Juan was a deacon and thus 25 years old when he wrote the Vita Isidori Agricolae in 1266, but his authorship of this biography of Isidore the Laborer is doubtful.

Nothing is known of Juans family or of his life before he entered the Franciscan order around 1269–1270 in the custodia of Zamora. He studied for a short period at the University of Salamanca before spending at least four years at the University of Paris, where he studied under Bonaventure and Godfrey of Fontaines. In 1276 or 1277, he obtained a Master of Theology degree at Paris. Some uncertainty attends his education. His university years have been placed as early as the late 1240s if a birth year towards 1230 be accepted. He may also have studied at the University of Siena. By 1278, he had returned to Zamora as a lecturer in theology and custodian (custos) of the custodia.

Juan appears around this time as a scribe in the court of King Alfonso X, who entrusted to him the education of his heir, the future Sancho IV. In his writings, he compared his relationship with Sancho to that of Aristotle with Alexander the Great. He was with Sancho at San Esteban de Gormaz on 26 October 1278, when the prince issued a charter defining the relationship of the church and municipal council of Zamora. Around 1300, he became minister provincial of the province of Santiago de Compostela. He died after 1318, probably around 1320. The exact date is unknown.

== Works ==
Juan was a prolific writer in Latin. At the court of Alfonso X, he had a hand in the production of the Primera Crónica General and the Cantigas de Santa María. He is the earliest Franciscan poet from Spain.

Fifteen of his works survive at least partially:

1. Prosologion seu tractatus de accentu et de dubilibus Bibliae (1274×1278)
  This is a grammatical treatise divided into three parts. The first part, De ortographia, covers spelling, etymology and phonetics. The second, De accentu seu prosodia, concerns poetry and the longest part. The third, De difficultatibus que legentibus et corrigentibus occurrunt in Biblia, is an interpretatio nominum (interpretation of biblical names) with a discussion of punctuation and pronunciation. This work survives in two recensions.
2. Historia naturalis (1275×1295)
  This is an encyclopedia of the natural world in 23 books, each corresponding to a letter of the Latin alphabet. Only book A and the start of B survive in two manuscripts. Compared to other 13th-century Latin encyclopedists, Juan's work is moralizing and written with sermon writers in mind. He appears to have begun collecting information for this work during his time in Paris.
3. Archiuium seu armarium scripturarum (c. 1278)
  This is an encyclopedia in 23 books, each corresponding to a letter of the Latin alphabet. It covers the natural world and secular and religious history. Only excerpts and fragments from books C, D, E and Z survive.
4. Dictaminis epithalamium (before 1282), dedicated to Filippo da Perugia
  This is a manual for the composition of letters and formal documents. Half of the text is taken up with examples.
5. Liber de preconiis Hispaniae (begun 1278, completed 1282)
  This is a curious moralizing encyclopedia of historical and geographical information to the glory of Spain. Dedicated to Prince Sancho, it was begun in 1278 and completed in September 1282. It is often classified as a mirror of princes, one of the earliest composed in Spain. Its information is derived from the Bible, Aristotle, John of Salisbury and numerous Spanish historians. It is divided into twelve chapters.
6. Liber de preconiis ciuitatis Numantinae (1282)
  This is an urban panegyric for Juan's native city, which he identified with ancient Numantia. It is divided into seven chapters and is dedicated to Prince Sancho for his entertainment, as opposed to his moral formation.
7. Liber illustrium personarum (c. 1282)
  This is an encyclopedia of historical persons. Only fragments and excerpts survive, including the entire section on the kings of Spain. The latest individual included is Suero Pérez, the bishop of Zamora who died in 1286.
8. Officium almifluae Uirginis (before 1284)
  This is a liturgical office for Mary, mother of Jesus, in the form of a 316-line poem.
9. Sermones sanctorum (before 1289)
  This is a collection of 70 sermons with a prologue.
10. Breuiloquium de uitiis et uirtutibus (before 1289)
  This is collection of 15 sermons on various vices and virtues. It was written after the Sermones sanctorum and dedicated to Bishop Martín Fernández of León.
11. Liber contra uenena et animalia uenenosa (1289×1295), dedicated to Raymond Gaufredi
  This is a medical treatise about poisons derived from plants, animals and minerals, organized alphabetically in 19 parts.
12. Ars musicae (1250s or 1296×1304)
  Start of the body of the Ars musica in the Vatican manuscript
  A treatise on music dedicated to a certain John, either John of Parma or the Italian Franciscan Giovanni Mincio da Morrovalle. It is divided into a prologue and 17 chapters. The first two chapters deal with the origins of music and its emotional effects. In the following chapter, he integrates the ideas of Guido of Arezzo, John of Afflighem and Boethius. The final chapter is devoted to musical instruments, and relies heavily on the work of Bartholomaeus Anglicus. Juan held that of all instruments only the organ was appropriate to church services.
13. Liber de Ihesu et Maria (1300)
  Originally composed as a single work consisting of three essays on the life of Jesus and eighteen on that of Mary, its two parts were transmitted independently. The single prologue covers both parts.
14. De proprietatibus animalium
  This is a zoological encyclopedia of which only book A survives. Its main sources were Avicenna, Vincent of Beauvais and Thomas of Cantimpré. It survives in two recensions.
15. Legendae sanctorum et festiuitatum aliarum de quibus ecclesia sollempnizat
  This is an alphabetical collection of 86 saints' lives intended for his fellow Franciscans.`

In addition, there are numerous citations to works by Juan that may not survive. It is probable that many citations are to known works under different titles. In some cases, the citations are probably to individual articles in his encyclopedia Archiuium seu armarium, which is only partially preserved. Many other attributions are more doubtful or highly speculative. Several scholars have advanced the thesis that Juan was the author of the Lucidario, an encyclopedic work associated with the court of Sancho IV. The Comentarius in Canticum canticorum, a commentary on the Song of Songs dedicated to Bishop Bertrand de L'Isle-Jourdain, is generally attributed to him.

== Bibliography ==
- Avril, François; Aniel, J. P.; Mentré, M.; Saulnier, A.; Zaluska, Y. (1983). Manuscrits enluminés de la péninsule Ibérique. Bibliothèque nationale de France.
- Bohdziewicz, Olga Soledad (2014). Una contribución al estudio de la prosa latina en la Castilla del siglo XIII: Edición crítica y estudio del Liber Mariae de Juan Gil de Zamora (PDF) (PhD dissertation). University of Buenos Aires.
- Caunedo del Potro, Betsabé (2018). "Juan Gil de Zamora". Diccionario biográfico español. Real Academia de la Historia.
- Hughes, Andrew (2001). "Egidius [Johannes Aegidius; Juan Gil] de Zamora". Grove Music Online.
- Loewen, Peter (2022). "Egidius [Johannes Aegidius; Juan Gil] de Zamora". Grove Music Online.
- O'Callaghan, Joseph F. (2003). "Gil de Zamora, Juan". In Gerli, E. Michael (ed.). Medieval Iberia: An Encyclopedia. New York: Routledge. pp. 361–362.
- Reinhardt, Klaus; Santiago Otero, Horacio (1986). Biblioteca bíblica ibérica medieval. Consejo Superior de Investigaciones Científicas.
- Salvador Martínez, H. (2010). Alfonso X, the Learned: A Biography. Translated by Odile Cisneros. Brill.
- Stevenson, Robert (2003). "Gil de Zamora, Juan, on Music". In Gerli, E. Michael (ed.). Medieval Iberia: An Encyclopedia. New York: Routledge. p. 362.
