= Lordship of L'Isle-Jourdain =

French county during the High Middle Ages

L'Isle-Jourdain (Occitan: Illa or Iscla) was a lordship and then county near Gers in Gascony during the High Middle Ages. It took its name, Jourdain, from its crusading baron who was baptised in the River Jordan on the First Crusade. Its last count sold the fief to the King of France.

== Lords ==
- Odo c.1000–1038
- Raymond 1038–1089
- Jordan I 1089–1132
- Bernard I 1132–?
- Jordan II ?–1195
- Jordan III 1196–1205, married 1175 to Esclarmonde of Foix (died 1215), had six children
- Bernard II Jordan 1205–1228, married Indie, daughter of Raymond V of Toulouse, fathered Bishop Bertrand of Toulouse
- Bernard III 1228–1240
- Jordan IV 1240–1271
- Jordan V 1271–1303 or 1306
- Bernard IV Jordan 1303 or 1306–1340

== Counts ==
- Bertrand I 1340–1349
- John Jordan I 1349–1365
- Bertrand II 1365–1369
- John Jordan II 1369–1375
- Jordan VI 1375–1405
- John I 1405–1421
