= Confraternity of the Holy Spirit of Marseille =

Religious association in Marseille, France

The Confraternity of the Holy Spirit of Marseille was a religious association founded in Marseille in 1212 for the defence of the faith and rights of the Catholic Church at the time of the Albigensian Crusade. It was founded by the apostolic legate Arnaud Amaury, partially to rehabilitate the name of the Holy Spirit, which had become strongly associated with the Cathar heresy.

The confraternity of Marseille was called both confratria and confraternitas in Latin. It was coopted by municipal elites, who tried through it to acquire greater independence for the city. The rectors of the confraternity were the de facto government of the city when, on 12 June 1216 in Balaguer, they signed a defensive military alliance with Sancho, acting regent of Aragon and Provence and an opponent of the Albigensian Crusade. In July 1218, it was dissolved by order of the bishop, Pierre de Montlaur.
