= Beatrice I of Bigorre =

Coat of arms of Beatrice

Beatrice I (French: Béatrix I^{re} de Bigorre; c. 1064 – after 14 October 1095) was a sovereign Countess of Bigorre from 1080 until 1095.

== Life ==
Her mother was called Étiennette, whilst her father was Bernard II of Bigorre. She also had a half-sister Clemence.

In 1077, Lady Beatrice married Centule V, Viscount of Béarn. In 1080, Beatrice became Countess, a successor of her brother, Count Raymond of Bigorre. As was the custom when a woman inherited a domain at that period, her spouse became her co-ruler.

Beatrice, with the help of Centule V, donated to some monasteries.

== Issue ==
- Bernard III of Bigorre
- Centule II, Count of Bigorre.

== Sources ==
- Débax, Hélène, ed. (2008). Vicomtes et vicomtés dans l'Occident médiéval (in French). Presses Universitaires du Mirail.
