= Rudolf of Geneva =

Count of Geneva from 1252 until his death in 1265

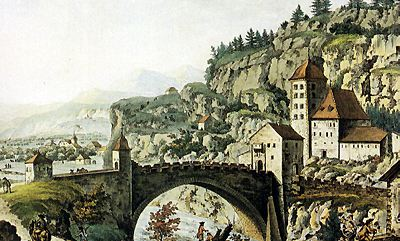
The castle of Saint-Maurice-d'Agaune as it appeared in 1782. It was in Rudolf's control, as a fief of Savoy, in 1263.

Rudolf or Rudolph (French: Raoul or Rodolphe de Genève) was the Count of Geneva from 1252 until his death in 1265. He was the eldest son of William II, and was described by a Renaissance historian as “the more quarrelsome son of a quarrelsome father.” He was a constant warrior, and his most frequent foes were of the House of Savoy.

== Heir of Geneva ==
Around 1234 Aymon II of Faucigny made himself protector of the priory of Chamonix, in violation of the rights of the Count of Geneva, then William II. This precipitated a war between the house of Geneva and that of Faucigny allied with the house of Savoy in the person of Aymon's son-in-law Peter, “the Little Charlemagne”. Late in 1236 or early the next year, during a temporary truce, Rudolf ambushed Peter in a mountain pass, while the latter was travelling with a very small retinue, and made him a prisoner. The exact circumstances of the ambush and of the events which followed are obscured, but it appears that in the ensuing war the Genevans were beaten. On 13 May 1237 Peter's elder brother, Amadeus IV of Savoy, acting as arbiter of the dispute between Geneva and Faucigny, ordered William II to pay a war indemnity and hand over certain fortresses. In the end Peter was freed.

In 1250, when the Savoyards appeared to be engaged in a concerted effort to expand their territory, William II and Rudolf again went to war, this time mainly in defence of the Albert III of La Tour-du-Pin, who was William's brother-in-law and Rudolf's father-in-law, and whose lands were threatened by both Peter and his brother Philip. In the war, Savoy defeated Geneva, and Philip imposed a “Carthaginian peace” on the losers. The indemnity had never been paid and was mercifully halved, and more castles were taken. It was a reduced patrimony that Rudolf inherited two years later.

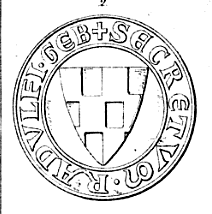
Rudolf's seal, showing his coat-of-arms.

== Count of Geneva ==
In November 1252 William II died at Domène. Rudolf immediately acted to expand his shrunken county of Geneva. By arms he forced Simon of Joinville, the lord of Gex and son of Simon, lord of Joinville, to do him homage. He seized the castle at Charousse and expelled a creditor of “the Little Charlemagne”, who was holding it as security on a loan. For this castle he steadfastly refused to do homage to any Savoyard. When his aunt, Margaret, the dowager countess of Savoy, died in 1258, Rudolf took over the lands at Cornillon and the Val des Clefs that formed her dowry.

Rudolf also sought to arbitrate the claims of his cousin Henry to the count of Geneva, which rights Henry had sold to Peter of Savoy. Early in 1260 Peter recaptured Charousse and, on 19 May, the three disputants met in Geneva to accept the decision of the arbiters Rudolf and Henry had chosen. Rudolf was allowed to keep Charousse if he did homage to Peter for it and paid the outstanding debt of £2,000 viennois (pounds of Vienne). The problem of the disputed succession to Geneva (William II had seized the county unlawfully) was deferred, and the lands ceded to Peter until the payment of the indemnity (the gagerie) was enlarged with the lands north and west of the Rhône from Seyssel to Lausanne, from the bridge over the Tacon to the mandamentum of the city of Geneva. The gagerie included the castles of Geneva, Charousse, Ballaison, Les Clées, Rue; the homages of the Count of Gruyére and of the lords of Langin, Oron and Vufflens; and all the jurisdictions Rudolf possessed in the Pays de Vaud, the Chablais and in Faucigny. The county of Geneva was reduced to the Genevois.

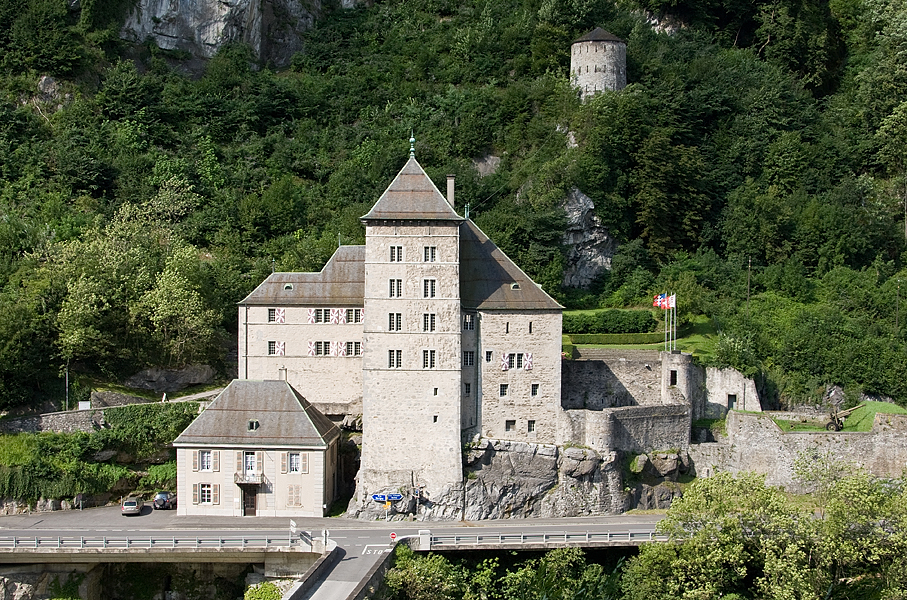
The castle of Saint-Maurice as it appears today.

In September 1262 Rudolf paid homage to the youthful Boniface, Count of Savoy, for the territories he held in fief from him. Boniface was probably not yet fourteen and still under the regency of his mother, Cécile des Baux. The homage of Rudolf is therefore one of the more important that comes down from the reign of Boniface, although it indicates that the latter was not yet styled with the full titulature of his father, Amadeus IV. Not long afterwards Boniface died and in August 1263 Rudolf was forced to homage anew to his old enemy, Peter, who was now Count of Savoy. After the arbitration of some minor differenced by the Bishop of Belley and the Abbot of Saint-Rambert, Rudolf did homage in an orchard below the castle at Saint-Rambert for his fiefs of Charousse, Cusy, Aubonne and Saint-Maurice-d'Agaune.

Rudolf died in 1265 and was succeeded by his son Aymon II, who was later succeeded by his brother Amadeus II.

== Bibliography ==
- Eugene L. Cox. The Eagles of Savoy: The House of Savoy in Thirteenth-Century Europe. Princeton, New Jersey: Princeton University Press, 1974.

Preceded by William II of Geneva	Count of Geneva; 1252–1265	Succeeded by Aymon II of Geneva
