= Ramon Berenguer III of Provence =

Ramon Berenguer III

Count of Provence
- Reign: 1173–1181
- Predecessor: Alfonso I
- Successor: Sancho
- Born: c. 1158
- Died: 5 April 1181 (aged 22–23); Montpellier
- Noble family: Barcelona
- Father: Ramon Berenguer IV, Count of Barcelona
- Mother: Petronilla of Aragon

Ramon Berenguer III or IV (c. 1158 – 5 April 1181), born Peter, was the count of Cerdanya (1162–1168) and count of Provence (1173–1181).

He was the third son of Count Raymond Berengar IV of Barcelona and Queen Petronilla of Aragon. He received Cerdanya, including Carcassonne and Narbonne, on his father's death, but relinquished it to his younger brother Sancho in 1168. He never did govern his inherited territories. In 1173, his elder brother, Alfonso, granted him Provence.

In 1176, he joined Sancho in conquering Nice from Genoa. He then ventured to war with the lords of Languedoc and the count of Toulouse. He was assassinated on 5 April 1181 by the men of Adhemar of Murviel near Montpellier. Provence passed to his brother Sancho.

Preceded by Raymond Berengar II	Count of Cerdanya; 1162–1168	Succeeded by Sancho
Preceded by Alfonso I	Count of Provence; 1173–1181	Succeeded by Sancho
