= Eskivat de Chabanais =

Eschivat IV Chabanais (died 1283) was Count of Bigorre from 1255 to 1283 and Count of Armagnac and de Fézensac of 1255 in 1256. He was the son of Jordan, Lord of Chabanais, and Alix de Montfort, Countess of Bigorre.

== Biography ==
He succeeded his mother as Count of Bigorre in 1255 and married Mascarós II d'Armagnac, Countess of Armagnac and Fézensac the same year. The counties of Armagnac and Fézensac were still claimed by Gerald, Viscount of Fezensaguet. The death of his wife, Mascarós, the following year, ended the conflict and made Gerald VI heir to the County of Armagnac.

He faced a new conflict, this time in Bigorre. Near the end of her life, the Countess Petronilla de Bigorre, Eschivat's grandmother, relinquished the government of Bigorre to her brother-in-law, Simon de Montfort Earl of Leicester and governor of Guyenne. Simon had interpreted this act as a gift and had been fought by the heiress of the county, Alix de Montfort assisted by her half-sister, Martha, wife of Gaston VII Viscount of Béarn. To prevent Guyenne and Gascony from rebelling, Henry III recalled Simon de Montfort and appointed John Grailly in his place.

Eschivat had succeeded his mother without protest, but made the mistake of keeping land that Mathe had in Bigorre. Gaston VII then invaded the county, forcing Eschivat to defend it, seeking the assistance of Prince Edward of England and the alliance of Count Roger IV of Foix he married the daughter Ines (1256).

In 1258, war resumed in the region and Eschivat agreed to temporarily surrender the County of Bigorre to Simon de Montfort, this time to end the conflict. In doing so, he committed the same mistake as his grandmother, because Simon refused to return the county. Soon after, Simon de Montfort rebelled against King Henry III, and Eschivat helped Gaston VII regain Bigorre.

After his death, his aunt Mathe and his sister Laura competed for the County of Bigorre.
