= Sentonge =

Sentonge (died 1173) was the probably legendary Viscount of Béarn in the French Pyrenees, from 1171 until his execution two years later. He was from Auvergne. The story of his succession to Béarn is probably not reliable and is likely a later invention.

In 1171, the nobles of Béarn executed their elected viscount Theobald. They invited Sentonge to take up the vicecomital office. He had served for two years when the nobles turned against him for infringing upon the Fors de Bearn. He was arrested and executed, to be replaced by Gaston VI.

Preceded by Theobald	Viscount of Béarn; 1171–1173	Succeeded by Gaston VI
