= Ramon Berenguer IV of Barcelona =

Count of Barcelona from 1131 to 1162

Ramon Berenguer IV
- Prince of Aragon
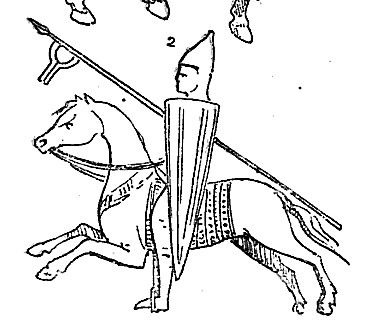
- Ramon Berenguer's effigy on his seal (1140)

Count of Barcelona
- Reign: 19 August 1131 – 6 August 1162
- Predecessor: Ramon Berenguer III
- Successor: Alfonso II of Aragon or Petronilla of Aragon
- Born: c. 1114; Barcelona, County of Barcelona
- Died: 6 August 1162 (aged 48–49); Borgo San Dalmazzo, Piedmont, County of Savoy
- Buried: Santa Maria de Ripoll
- Noble family: Barcelona
- Spouse: Petronilla of Aragon
- Issue: Alfonso II of Aragon; Ramon Berenguer III, Count of Provence; Dulce, Queen of Portugal; Sancho, Count of Provence; Ramon, Archbishop of Narbonne (ill.)
- Father: Ramon Berenguer III, Count of Barcelona
- Mother: Douce I, Countess of Provence

Ramon Berenguer IV (Catalan pronunciation: [rəˈmom bəɾəŋˈɡe]; c. 1114 – 6 August 1162, Anglicized Raymond Berengar IV), sometimes called the Saint, was the count of Barcelona and the prince of Aragon who brought about the union of the County of Barcelona with the Kingdom of Aragon to form the Crown of Aragon.

== Early reign ==
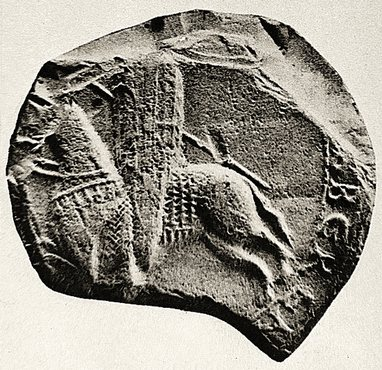
Seal of Ramon Berenguer IV (1150). Earliest confirmed evidence of the four bars

Ramon Berenguer was born 1114, the son of Count Ramon Berenguer III of Barcelona and Countess Douce I of Provence. He inherited the county of Barcelona from his father Ramon Berenguer III on 19 August 1131. On 11 August 1137, at the age of about 24, he was betrothed to the infant Petronilla of Aragon, aged one at the time. Petronilla's father, King Ramiro II of Aragon, who sought Barcelona's aid against King Alfonso VII of Leon, withdrew from public life on 13 November 1137, leaving his kingdom to Petronilla and Ramon Berenguer.

In effect becoming ruler of Aragon, although Ramon Berenguer was never king himself in acknowledgment of his own status as a prince-consort, instead commonly using the titles "Count of the Barcelonans and Prince of the Aragonians" (Comes Barcinonensis et Princeps Aragonensis), and occasionally those of "Marquis of Lleida and Tortosa" (after conquering these cities). However, he explicitly used the title of king at least on one occasion, in 1139. According to Antonio Ubieto Arteta, Ramon ruled the Kingdom of Aragon on behalf of the sovereign Petronilla as her prince consort, while according to Cristian Palomo, Ramon ruled as the sovereign prince of the Crown of Aragon, the union of the Kingdom of Aragon and the County of Barcelona. On the other hand, according to Sonia Vital Fernández, Ramon, in the line of succession, ranked behind Petronilla and even the retired Ramiro II, and exercised an authority subordinate to theirs.

The treaty between Ramon Berenguer and his father-in-law, Ramiro II, stipulated that their descendants would rule jointly over both realms, and that even if Petronilla died before the marriage could be consummated, Ramon Berenguer's heirs would still inherit the Kingdom of Aragon. Both realms would preserve their laws, institutions and autonomy, remaining legally distinct but federated in a dynastic union under one ruling house. Historians consider this arrangement the political masterstroke of the Hispanic Middle Ages. Both realms gained greater strength and security and Aragon got its much needed outlet to the sea. On the other hand, formation of a new political entity in the north-east at the time when Portugal seceded from León in the west gave more balance to the Christian kingdoms of the peninsula. Ramon Berenguer successfully pulled Aragon out of its pledged submission to Castile, aided no doubt by his sister Berengaria, wife of Alfonso VII, who was well known in her time for her beauty and charm.

== Crusades and wars ==
In the middle years of his rule, Ramon Berenguer turned his attention to campaigns against the Moors. In October 1147, as part of the Second Crusade, he helped Castile to conquer Almería. He then invaded the lands of the Almoravid taifa kingdoms of Valencia and Murcia. In December 1148, he captured Tortosa after a six-month siege with the help of Southern French, Anglo-Norman and Genoese crusaders. The next year, Fraga, Lleida and Mequinenza in the confluence of the Segre and Ebro rivers fell to his army after a seven-month siege.

Ramon Berenguer also campaigned in Provence, helping his brother Berenguer Ramon and his infant nephew Ramon Berenguer II against the counts of Toulouse. During the minority of Ramon Berenguer II, the count of Barcelona also acted as the regent of Provence (between 1144 and 1157). In 1151, Ramon signed the Treaty of Tudilén with Alfonso VII of León and Castile. The treaty defined the zones of conquest in Andalusia as an attempt to prevent the two rulers from coming into conflict. Also in 1151, Ramon Berenguer founded and endowed the royal monastery of Poblet. In 1154, he accepted the regency of Gaston V of Béarn in return for the Bearnese nobles rendering him homage at Canfranc, thus uniting that small principality with the growing Aragonese state.

== Marriage and children ==
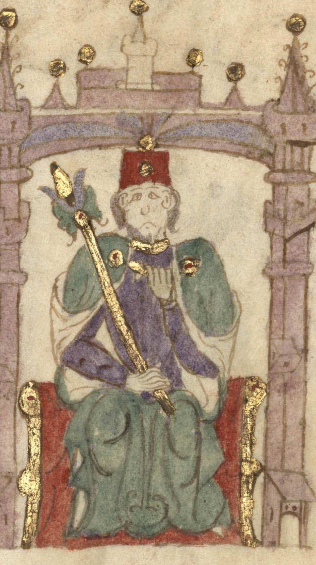
Ramon Berenguer IV in the Semblanzas de reyes, where he is one of the few non-royal rulers depicted without a crown

Ramon and Petronilla had:

- Peter
- Alfonso II of Aragon
- Ramon Berenguer III, Count of Provence
- Dulce, Queen of Portugal
- Sancho, Count of Provence

== Death ==
Ramon Berenguer IV died on 6 August 1162 in Borgo San Dalmazzo, Piedmont, Italy. He was succeeded by Petronilla and then by his eldest surviving son, Ramon Berenguer, who also inherited the Kingdom of Aragon upon Petronilla's abdication in 1164. He changed his name to Alfonso as a nod to his Aragonese lineage, and became Alfonso II of Aragon. Ramon Berenguer IV's younger son Pere (Peter) inherited the county of Cerdanya and lands north of the Pyrenees, and changed his name to Ramon Berenguer.

== Appearance and character ==
The Chronicle of San Juan de la Peña said he was, "[a] man of particularly great nobility, prudence, and probity, of lively temperament, high counsel, great bravery, and steady intellect, who displayed great temperance in all his actions. He was handsome in appearance, with a large body and very well-proportioned limbs."

== Bibliography ==
- Benito, Pere (2017-09-25). "An Intense but Stymied Occitan Campaign". In Sabaté, Flocel (ed.). The Crown of Aragon: A Singular Mediterranean Empire. BRILL. pp. 92–124. ISBN 978-90-04-34961-2.
- Bisson, Thomas N. (1989). Medieval France and Her Pyrenean Neighbours: Studies in Early Institutional History. The Hambledon Press. ISBN 978-0-907628-69-9.
- Diffie, Bailey Wallys (1960). Prelude to Empire: Portugal Overseas Before Henry the Navigator. University of Nebraska Press. ISBN 978-0-8032-5049-9.
- Graham-Leigh, Elaine (2005). The Southern French Nobility and the Albigensian Crusade. The Boydell Press. ISBN 978-1-84383-129-7.
- O'Callaghan, Joseph F. (2013-04-15) [1975]. A History of Medieval Spain. Cornell University Press. ISBN 978-0-8014-6872-8.
- Villegas-Aristizabal, Lucas (2009), "Anglo-Norman involvement in the conquest of Tortosa and Settlement of Tortosa, 1148-1180", Crusades 8, pp. 63–129.

Regnal titles
Preceded by Ramon Berenguer III	Count of Barcelona; 1131–1162	Succeeded by Alfonso II or Petronilla
