= Bertrand de L'Isle-Jourdain (bishop of Toulouse) =

Bertrand de L'Isle-Jourdain (1227–1286) was the bishop of Toulouse from 1270 until his death.

Bertrand was a son of Bernard Jordan, the lord of L'Isle-Jourdain, and Indie, an illegitimate daughter of Count Raymond V of Toulouse. He was born after the death of his father in 1227. In accordance with his father's will, he was given to the cathedral of Toulouse to be raised by the church. He was serving the cathedral as provost when Bishop Raymond du Fauga died on 19 October 1270.

Bertrand was unanimously elected to succeed Raymond. He was ordained a priest two days before his consecration as bishop. He joined the Order of Saint Augustine. As bishop, he unsuccessfully defended his vassals' claim of exemption from service in the royal army. He began a reconstruction of the cathedral in the Gothic style, devoting much of his personal wealth to the project. The choir and the chapels to its north and south were begun during his episcopate. After his death in 1286, he became the first bishop of Toulouse to be buried in the cathedral.

Juan Gil de Zamora dedicated his commentary on the Song of Songs to Bertrand. The Rue Bertrand-de-l'Isle in Toulouse is named after him.
