= Bertrand I of L'Isle-Jourdain =

14th century French noble

Bertrand I of L'Isle-Jourdain (died c.1349) was the Count of L'Isle-Jourdain (Comte de Insule iordani) from 1340 to his death. He was the son of Bernard IV Jordan and Marguerite de Foix.

== Life ==
Bertrand was a son of Bernard IV Jordan and Marguerite de Foix. He was captured during the Battle of Auberoche on 21 October 1345 during the English Gascon campaign of 1345 by an Anglo-Gascon force under the command of Henry, Earl of Derby. He married Isabelle de Lévis and was succeeded by his eldest son John of L'Isle-Jourdain.
