= Petronilla of Bigorre =

Petronilla

Countess of Bigorre
- Born: c.1184
- Died: 1251
- Spouses: Gaston VI, Viscount of Béarn; Nuño Sánchez; Guy de Montfort; Aymor de Racon; Boson of Mastas, Seigneur de Cognac
- Issue: Alice, Countess of Bigorre; Petronilla de la Roche-Tesson; Martha of Mastas
- Father: Bernard IV, Count of Comminges
- Mother: Stephanie-Beatrice IV, Countess of Bigorre

Petronilla of Bigorre or Petronilla of Comminges (c. 1184–1251) was ruling Countess of Bigorre between 1194 and 1251. She was the only child of Bernard IV, Count of Comminges, and his wife Stephanie-Beatrice IV, Countess of Bigorre. Petronilla succeeded her mother in 1194 as Countess of Bigorre; she was also Viscountess of Marsan and Nébouzan through further successions. She reigned as countess for fifty-seven years, in which time she was married five times.

== Biography ==
=== Early life ===
Petronilla was born around 1184 as the only child of her parents, and was therefore their heir. As a child, Petronilla was at the centre of political plans, first conducted by her father who acted as regent after the death of Stephanie-Beatrice. However, Petronilla's guardianship was soon handed over to Alfonso II of Aragon who had Petronilla betrothed and married to one of his allies Gaston VI, Viscount of Béarn in early 1196. Gaston ruled jointly with Petronilla over Bigorre. The couple remained childless. Gaston participated in the 45-year Albigensian Crusade, a time in which he lost favour. He was excommunicated by the Council of Vabres and his territories declared forfeit by the pope.

=== Adulthood ===
Petronilla's husband Gaston died in 1214 leaving her a childless widow aged around thirty. The following year, Petronilla was married to Nuño Sánchez, a grandson of Petronilla of Aragon; however, the marriage was annulled by Pope Honorius III the very next year, in 1216. The leader of the ongoing crusade, Simon de Montfort, 5th Earl of Leicester, who was at that time at the height of his power, had Petronilla in 1216 married to his own son Guy. The power of the Montfort family began to decline during the Albigensian Crusade. There was opposition by the local nobility in 1218, Simon de Montfort was killed at Toulouse and Guy himself was killed in 1220 when taking Castelnaudary. Petronilla was left with two daughters by this marriage.

Although her husband and father-in-law had died, Petronilla remained at their property in the camp of the northern French crusaders as her brother-in-law Amaury de Montfort succeeded and had his sister-in-law remarried to Aymor de Racon. This was followed by the failure of the papal crusade in 1224 and the death of Aymor, the couple having no children.

In 1228 Petronilla married for the fifth and final time, her latest husband being Boson of Mastas, Seigneur de Cognac. Petronilla spent the next few years on her husband's estates in Aquitaine as they had made themselves unpopular by their marriages with the Crusaders and their own people. In 1230, Petronilla returned to Bigorre with her husband where public order had collapsed, as a result of her many years of absence, and restored it. In 1232 they attacked Petronilla's half-brother Bernard V in order to inherit the Comminges as their father had died in 1225. Although the claim on Comminges could not be enforced, Petronilla did inherit large parts of the Nébouzan from her father. In 1242 Petronilla was reconciled with the nobility of Languedoc, who had turned against her because of her hostile northern French husband, Boson, after she and her husband were in the revolt of Count Raymond VII of Toulouse. The rebellion had failed and Boson lost favour with Louis IX of France and eventually died in 1251.

=== Children ===
In total Petronilla had three children, two from her third marriage and one by her fifth marriage:

With Guy de Monfort she had two daughters:

- Alix (1217/1220 – 1255), succeeded her mother as Countess of Bigorre; she was married firstly to Jordan, Lord of Chabanais, by whom she had issue; and secondly to Raoul de Courtenay, with issue.
- Petronilla, married Raoul de la Roche-Tesson

With Boson of Mastas she had one daughter:

- Martha (also known as Amata) (after 1228-6 February 1270/April 1273), married Gaston VII, Viscount of Béarn, and had issue

=== Death and legacy ===
Near the end of her life, the Countess Petronilla relinquished the government of Bigorre to her brother-in-law, Simon de Montfort, Earl of Leicester and governor of Guyenne. Petronilla retired to an abbey and died in 1251.

Simon had interpreted Petronilla's act of relinquishing Bigorre to him as a gift and he was fought by Alix (Petronilla's daughter and heiress) assisted by Martha. To prevent Guyenne and Gascony from rebelling, Henry III of England recalled Simon de Montfort and appointed John Grailly in his place.

Petronilla's grandson was Eschivat de Chabanais who had succeeded his mother Alix without protest, but made the mistake of keeping land that Martha had in Bigorre. Martha's husband Gaston VII of Béarn then invaded the county, forcing Eschivat to defend it, seeking the assistance of Prince Edward of England and the alliance of Count Roger IV of Foix.

In 1258, war resumed in the region and Eschivat agreed to temporarily surrender the County of Bigorre to Simon de Montfort, this time to end the conflict. In doing so, he committed the same mistake as his grandmother, Petronilla, because Simon refused to return the county. Soon after, Simon de Montfort rebelled against King Henry III, and Eschivat helped Gaston VII regain Bigorre.

After his death, Petronilla's daughter Martha and her granddaughter by Alix, Laura, competed for the County of Bigorre. After this point the succession become disputed and whether the county owed allegiance to England or France was also fought over. In 1360, the Treaty of Brétigny made it decisively French. In 1407, it belonged to Bernard VII of Armagnac, who sold it that year to John I, Count of Foix, (a descendant of Petronilla through Martha). From then on it has been a subsidiary title of the counts of Foix.
