= Martha, Viscountess of Marsan =

French noblewoman

Martha of Marsan (1228–1283) (also known as Mathe or Amata) was a ruling Viscountess of Marsan. She was suo jure Viscountess of Marsan, which she inherited from her father, in 1251-1270.

== Life ==
Martha was a daughter of Petronilla, Countess of Bigorre by her fourth husband Boson of Marsan. Her dates of birth and death are disputed, though it is believed that she was born soon after the marriage of her parents in 1228 and died after she claimed Bigorre in 1283.

Petronilla made a testament soon after the birth of Martha, so that Alice would inherit her title of Countess of Bigorre. Whilst Martha, would inherit the title of Viscountess of Marsen from her father.

Upon the death of Countess Petronilla in 1251, Alice should have succeeded her. However, before Petronilla's death, she had handed control of the government over to Simon de Montfort, 6th Earl of Leicester, who interpreted the act as a gift and so did not allow Alice to claim her inheritance. Martha did inherit her title as Viscountess upon the deaths of her parents. Alice appealed to Martha and Gaston for help in claiming her inheritance, the couple sent Alice military support and forced De Montfort to abandon his claims, returning to England soon after.

Alice ruled as countess for four years and died in 1255. She was succeeded by her son, Eskivat de Chabanais. However, Martha's nephew made the mistake of keeping land that she had in Bigorre. Gaston VII then invaded the county, forcing Eschivat to defend it, seeking alliances with the English and Roger IV, Count of Foix.

In 1258, war resumed in the region and Eschivat agreed to temporarily surrender the County of Bigorre to Simon de Montfort, this time to end the conflict. In doing so, he committed the same mistake as his grandmother, because Simon refused to return the county. Soon after, Simon de Montfort rebelled against King Henry III of England, and Eschivat helped Gaston VII and Martha regain Bigorre. He died in 1283, without children.

After the death on Eschivat, Martha and her niece by Alice, named Laura, both made claim for Bigorre. This dispute would continue long after the death of Martha, the claims being passed onto her own daughters and their descendants. Following Martha's death, there was a succession dispute amongst her husband and four daughters with Margaret eventually succeeding him. Constance inherited the title of Viscountess from Martha.

== Family ==
Between 1245 and 1250, Martha married Gaston VII, Viscount of Béarn, they had:

- Constance (died 1310), succeeded in Marsan and Bigorre. Married firstly, on 23 March 1260, to the Aragonese infante Alfonso, son of James the Conqueror, who died 26 March; married secondly, on 15 May 1269, to Henry of Almain, son of Richard of Cornwall; and married thirdly, in 1279, to Aymon II of Geneva
- Margaret, succeeded in Béarn. Married, in 1252, to Roger-Bernard III de Foix
- Martha, married Gerald VI, Count of Armagnac in 1260
- Guillelme (or Guillemette; died 1309), affianced in 1270 to Sancho IV of Castile, annulled 1281; married, in 1291, to the Aragonese infante Peter (1275–1296), son of Peter III of Aragon.

== Sources ==
- Lodge, Eleanor C. (1926). Gascony under English Rule. Methuen & Co. Ltd.
