= Bernard IV Jordan of L'Isle-Jourdain =

Bernard (or Bertrand) IV Jordan (died 1340) was the Lord of L'Isle-Jourdain (Insule iordani) from 1303 or 1304 to his death. He was the son and successor of Jordan IV and his first wife Faidiva. Bernard Jordan maintained an alliance with Gaston I of Foix.

He may have taken part in the Aragonese Crusade in 1284. For five years from his accession to 1309, Bernard Jordan served as seneschal of Languedoc for Philip IV of France. Between 1328 and 1331, he was interested in accompanying Philip VI of France on a Reconquista against the Kingdom of Granada, but nothing ever came of it.

On 29 April 1319, Pope John XXII called him "son" when writing to complain of the recent Ghibelline ascendancy in Lombardy.

Bernard married firstly Marguerite de Foix (died 1304), daughter of Roger-Bernard III of Foix (1240–1303) and Margaret of Béarn, married secondly Berenguela de Montcada, and thirdly Sedille de Durfort, daughter of Arnaud de Durfort.

He was succeeded by his eldest son Bertrand and is also known to have had several other children; Gaston, John, Mathe, Marguerite and Indie.

== Sources ==
- Tyerman, C. J. (January 1985). "Philip VI and the Recovery of the Holy Land". The English Historical Review. 100 (394): 25–52. doi:10.1093/ehr/c.cccxciv.25. JSTOR 569926.
- Rogozinski, Jan. (July 1969). "The Counsellors of the Seneschal of Beaucaire and Nîmes, 1250-1350". Speculum. 44 (3): 421–439. doi:10.2307/2855503. JSTOR 2855503.
- Previté-Orton, C. W. (April 1929). "Marsilius of Padua and the Visconti (in Notes and Documents)". The English Historical Review. 44 (174): 278–279. doi:10.1093/ehr/xliv.clxxiv.278. JSTOR 553190.
