= Beatrice III of Bigorre =

Beatrice III of Bigorre, also called Stephanie-Beatrice (III) (circa 1160 - 1199), was a Countess regnant suo jure of Bigorre between 1178 and 1192.

Beatrice inherited the Count of Bigorre by her father in 1178.

In 1192, she was deposed and exiled by her husband, who took the County for himself. His accession to her fief was however contested by the King of Aragon, who forced him to renounce the County to their daughter Petronilla, Countess of Bigorre.

Beatrice died a couple of years later.
