= Ars musica (Juan Gil de Zamora) =

Start of the Ars musica in the 1784 edition

The Ars musica (or Ars musicae) is a treatise on music theory by Juan Gil de Zamora, a polymath in the literary circle around King Alfonso X of Castile. It has been dated to as early as the 1250s or as late as the period 1296–1304. It is the only surviving work of music theory from medieval Castile.

The Ars musica was written in Latin, which may indicate that Gil intended to reach an international audience. It is dedicated to a certain John, either John of Parma or the Italian Franciscan Giovanni Mincio da Morrovalle. It is divided into a prologue and 17 chapters. The first two chapters deal with the origins of music and its emotional effects. In the following chapter, Gil integrates the ideas of Guido of Arezzo, John of Afflighem and Boethius. The final chapter is devoted to musical instruments, and relies heavily on the work of Bartholomaeus Anglicus. Gil held that of all instruments only the organ was appropriate to church services.

Gil's list of instruments is the Ars musica's most unique and commented upon contribution to medieval music theory. Following al-Farabi, he distinguishes between natural or living instruments (i.e., the human voice) and artificial or dead instruments. After quoting from the Book of Daniel—"when you hear the sound of the horn, pipe, lyre, trigon, harp, drum, and entire musical ensemble" (3:4–5, NRSVue)—he proceeds to describe a series of instruments, some developed since Daniel's time. Among these instruments are:

- canon
- mediocanon
- rebab
- organ
- trumpet (invented by the Etruscans)
- buccina
- aulos or tibia
- flute
- panpipes
- pandorium
- symphonia
- tympanum
- cithara
- psalterium
- lyre
- cymbals
- sistrum
- tintinnabulum

The most important manuscript of the Ars musica and the basis for modern editions is Arch. Cap. S. Pietro. H.29 in the Vatican Library. It is a copy of the 14th century. The text of the Ars musica was printed by Martin Gerbert in 1784. It has been translated into French and Spanish.

== Bibliography ==
- Bohdziewicz, Olga Soledad (2014). Una contribución al estudio de la prosa latina en la Castilla del siglo XIII: Edición crítica y estudio del Liber Mariae de Juan Gil de Zamora (PDF) (PhD dissertation). University of Buenos Aires.
- Loewen, Peter (2022). "Egidius [Johannes Aegidius; Juan Gil] de Zamora". Grove Music Online.
- Páez Martínez, Martín, ed. (2009). Ars Musica de Juan Gil de Zamora. Real Academia de Bellas Artes de Santa María de la Arrixaca.
- Randel, Don M. (1987). "La teoría musical en la época de Alfonso X el Sabio". Revista de Musicología. 10 (1): 39–51. doi:10.2307/20795082. JSTOR 20795082.
- Robert-Tissot, Michel, ed. (1974). Johannes Aegidius de Zamora: Ars Musica. American Institute of Musicology.
- Stevenson, Robert (2003). "Gil de Zamora, Juan, on Music". In Gerli, E. Michael (ed.). Medieval Iberia: An Encyclopedia. New York: Routledge. p. 362.
- Zaldívar Gracia, Álvaro (2009). "Introducción". Ars Musica de Juan Gil de Zamora. Real Academia de Bellas Artes de Santa María de la Arrixaca. pp. xi–xxviii.
