= Beatrice II of Bigorre =

Beatrice II of Bigorre (c. 1110-1156), was a Countess regnant suo jure of Bigorre in 1130-1156.
