= Gerald VI of Armagnac =

Gerald VI, Count of Armagnac
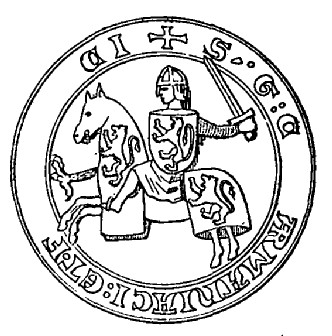
- Seal of Gerald VI
- Born: 1235
- Died: 1285 (aged 49–50)
- Noble family: House of Armagnac
- Spouse: Mathe de Béarn
- Issue Detail: Bernard VI, Count of Armagnac; Gaston d'Armagnac; Roger d'Armagnac
- Father: Roger d'Armagnac, Viscount of Fezensaguet
- Mother: Pincelle d'Albret

Gerald VI (1235–1285) was Viscount Fezensaguet from 1240 to 1285, then Count of Armagnac and Fézensac from 1256 to 1285. He was the son of Roger d'Armagnac, Viscount of Fezensaguet, and Pincelle d'Albret.

== Life ==
In 1249 he contested the possession of Armagnac and Fézensac which led to war with Arnaud Odon, Viscount Lomagne and Auvillars, husband of Mascarós I of Armagnac, heir to the counties of Armagnac and Fezensac and father of Mascarós Lomagne II. In this war Gerald was supported by his overlord, Count Raymond VII of Toulouse. Captured, he was released for ransom and continued the fight successfully. During his captivity, his mother, Pincelle d'Albret, presented in his name the county of Fezensaguet as tribute to Alphonse of Poitiers, the successor of Raymond VII, in return for continued support. It was not until 1255 that Gaston, Viscount of Bearn, managed to reconcile the adversaries.

In 1256, after the death of the childless Mascarós II Lomagne, Gerald, being her closest relative, inherited the counties of Armagnac and Fezensac. Following numerous quarrels with the Seneschal of Languedoc, he was captured and imprisoned two years in the castle of Peronne. Liberated, he paid homage to Edward I, King of England.

== Marriage and children ==
In 1260, he married Mathe de Béarn (1250 † ap.1317), daughter of Gaston VII, Viscount of Béarn and Martha, Viscountess of Marsan

They had six children:

- Bernard VI (v.1270 † 1319), Count of Armagnac and Fezensac
- Gaston d'Armagnac (v.1275 † 1320), stem from the branch of the Viscounts of Fezensaguet
- Roger d'Armagnac († 1339), Archbishop of Auch, Bishop of Laon and Lavaur
- Mascarós Armagnac (v.1285 †), wife of William Arnaud Fumel (v.1280 †), Vicomte de Labarthe and Aure
- Alarcon Armagnac (v.1285 † 1313), married Bernard VIII (v.1285 † 1336), Count of Comminges
- Mathe d'Armagnac (v.1285 † 1313), married Bernard Trenqueléon Lomagne (v.1280 † 1337), Lord of Fimarcon.

== Notes ==
Gerald VI of Armagnac House of Armagnac Born: 1235 Died: 1285
Preceded by Eskivat de Chabanais	Count of Armagnac; 1256-1285	Succeeded by Bernard VI
