= Gaston VII of Béarn =

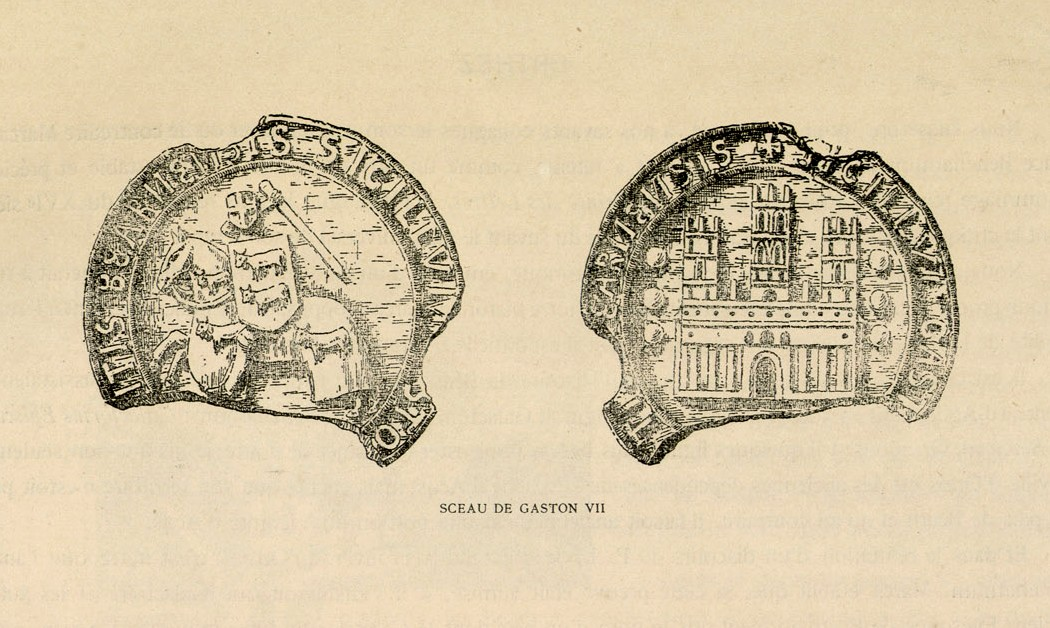
Gaston VII's seal

Gaston VII de Montcada (Latin: Guasto de Biarde; 1225 – 26 April 1290), called Froissard, was the twentieth Viscount of Béarn from 1229. He was the son and heir of Guillermo II de Montcada of the House of Montcada and of Garsenda, daughter of Alfonso II of Provence and Garsenda of Forcalquier. He was succeeded by Roger-Bernard III of Foix.

== Regulating the governance ==
On the domestic front, Gaston issued a series of fueros (laws), part of the Fors de Bearn, for each of the Béarnais valleys. He issued two for Aspe, one in 1247 and another in 1250. In that same year Gaston declared his second daughter, Margaret, to be the heir of Béarn, but his third daughter and her powerful husband, Geraud VI of Armagnac, would not accept it. Towards the end of his life he reneged and declared as his heir his youngest daughter, Guillemette, but upon his death Béarn was seized by Margaret's husband, Roger-Bernard III of Foix.

== Order of the Faith and Peace ==
Gaston was highly reputed as a warrior, staunch defender of the Béarnais, ally of the French, and enemy of the English. A powerful and independent figure in Gascony, he was the first major patron of the Order of the Faith and Peace. He was defeated and captured by Simon de Montfort, 6th Earl of Leicester, in 1248. In 1250 he was brought to England with Simon, who pardoned him there.

== Imprisonment ==
However, in 1252 Gaston once more rebelled when he allied with Alfonso X of Castile, who had laid claim to the Duchy of Gascony. This time Henry III pursued a diplomatic strategy; he arranged a marriage between his son Edward and Alfonso's daughter Eleanor. Fourteen-year-old Edward was then granted the duchy by his father. In January 1276 Gaston surrendered to Edward and was imprisoned at Winchester. Three years later he made an agreement with Edward whereby his lands were restored.

== Family ==
Between 1245 and 1250 Gaston married Martha, Viscountess of Marsan, daughter of Boson de Mathe, lord of Cognac, and Petronilla of Bigorre. The couple had:

- Constance (died 1310), succeeded in Marsan and Bigorre. Married, firstly, on 23 March 1260, to the Aragonese infante Alfonso, son of James the Conqueror, who died 26 March; married, secondly, on 15 May 1269, to Henry of Almain, son of Richard of Cornwall; and married, thirdly, in 1279, to Aymon II of Geneva
- Margaret, succeeded in Béarn. Married, in 1252, to Roger-Bernard III of Foix
- Mathe, married Gerald VI, Count of Armagnac in 1260
- Guillelme (or Guillemette; died 1309), affianced in 1270 to Sancho IV of Castile, annulled 1281; married, in 1291, to the Aragonese infante Peter (died 1296), son of Peter the Great

Widowed, Gaston married again on 2 April 1273 to Beatrice, daughter of Peter II of Savoy and Agnes of Faucigny, widow of Guigues VII of Viennois

== Sources ==
- Cox, Eugene L. (1974). The Eagles of Savoy: The House of Savoy in Thirteenth-Century Europe. Princeton University Press.
- Guillén, Fernando Arias (2020). The Triumph of an Accursed Lineage: Kingship in Castile from Alfonso X to Alfonso XI (1252-1350). Routledge. ISBN 9781000287202.
- Howell, Margaret (2001). Eleanor of Provence: Queenship in Thirteenth-Century England. Blackwell Publishers.
- Johnston, Mark D. (2009). "The Occitan Enssenhamen de l'escudier and Essenhamen de la donzela of Amanieu de Sescas". In Ashley, Kathleen M.; Johnston, Mark (eds.). Medieval Conduct Literature: An Anthology of Vernacular Guides to Behaviour for Youths with English Translations. University of Toronto Press. pp. 23–60. ISBN 9780802098320.
