= Alfonso II of Aragon =

King of Aragon from 1162/64 to 1196

Alfonso the Chaste
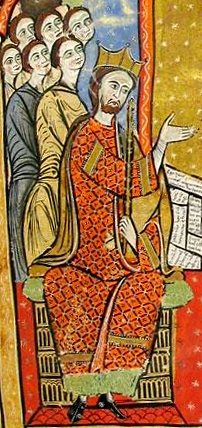
- Portrait from the 12th-century manuscript Liber feudorum maior

King of Aragon Count of Barcelona
- Reign: 7 August 1162 or 18 July 1164 – 25 April 1196
- Predecessor: Ramon Berenguer IV of Barcelona (1162) or Petronilla (1164)
- Successor: Peter II
- Regent: Petronilla (until 1173)
- Born: 1–25 March 1157; Huesca, Kingdom of Aragon
- Died: 25 April 1196 (aged 39); Perpignan, Principality of Catalonia
- Burial: Poblet Monastery
- Spouse: Sancha of Castile (m. 1174)
- Issue among others...: Peter II, King of Aragon; Constance, Queen of Hungary and Holy Roman Empress; Alfonso II, Count of Provence; Eleanor, Countess of Toulouse; Sancha, Countess of Toulouse
- House: Barcelona
- Father: Ramon Berenguer IV, Count of Barcelona
- Mother: Petronilla, Queen of Aragon

Alfonso II (1–25 March 1157 – 25 April 1196), called the Chaste or the Troubadour, was the King of Aragon and, as Alfons I, the Count of Barcelona from 1164 until his death. The eldest son of Count Ramon Berenguer IV of Barcelona and Queen Petronilla of Aragon, he was the first King of Aragon who was also Count of Barcelona. He was also Count of Provence, which he secured from Douce II and her would-be father-in-law Raymond V, Count of Toulouse, from 1166 until 1173, when he ceded it to his brother, Ramon Berenguer III. His reign has been characterised by nationalistic and nostalgic Catalan historians as l'engrandiment occitànic or "the Pyrenean unity": a great scheme to unite various lands on both sides of the Pyrenees under the rule of the House of Barcelona.

== Reign ==
Born at Huesca, Alfonso, called indistinctly from birth Alfonso and Ramon, ascended the united throne of Aragon and Barcelona as Alfonso, in deference to the Aragonese, to honour Alfonso the Battler.

For most of his reign he was allied with Alfonso VIII of Castile, both against Navarre and against the Moorish taifas of the south. In his Reconquista effort Alfonso pushed as far as Teruel, conquering this important stronghold on the road to Valencia in 1171. The same year saw him capturing Caspe.

Apart from common interests, Crown of Aragon and Castile were united by a formal bond of vassalage the former owed to the latter. Besides, on January 18, 1174, in Zaragoza Alfonso married Sancha, sister of the Castilian king. Another milestone in this alliance was the Treaty of Cazorla between the two kings in 1179, delineating zones of conquest in the south along the watershed of the rivers Júcar and Segura. Southern areas of Valencia including Denia were thus secured to Aragon. Alfonso also reached an agreement, the Treaty of Sangüesa (1168), with Sancho VI of Navarre dividing the territory of the Taifa of Murcia between them.

During his reign Catalan-Aragonese influence north of the Pyrenees reached its zenith, a natural tendency given the affinity between the Occitan, Catalan and Aragonese dominions of the Crown of Aragon. His realms incorporated not only Provence (from 1166 or just before), but also the counties of Cerdanya (1168) and Roussillon (inherited in 1172). Béarn and Bigorre paid homage to him in 1187. Alfonso's involvement in the affairs of Languedoc, which would cost the life of his successor, Peter II of Aragon, for the moment proved highly beneficial, strengthening Aragonese trade and stimulating emigration from the north to colonise the newly reconquered lands in Aragon.

In 1186, he helped establish catalan influence in Sardinia when he supported his cousin Agalbursa, the widow of the deceased Judge of Arborea, Barison II, in placing her grandson, the child of her eldest daughter Ispella, Hugh, on the throne of Arborea in opposition to Peter of Serra. And then in 1372, under James II of Aragon, when catalan conquerors repopulated the city of Alghero after exiling the indigenous populations in Sardinia.

Alfonso II provided the first land grant to the Cistercian monks on the banks of the Ebro River in the Aragon region, which would become the site of the first Cistercian monastery in this region. The Monasterio de Piedra was founded in 1194 with thirteen monks from Poblet Monastery, in an old castle next to the Piedra river, the Real Monasterio de Nuestra Senora de Rueda was founded in 1202 and utilized some of the first hydrological technology in the region for harnessing water power and river diversion for the purpose of building central heating. He also became a patron to the Carthusians and founded the first chapterhouse of Scala Dei in 1196.

He died at Perpignan in 1196.

== Literary patronage and poetry ==
He was a noted poet of his time and a close friend of King Richard the Lionheart. One tensó, "Be·m plairia, Seingner En Reis", apparently composed by him and Giraut de Bornelh, forms part of the poetical debate as to whether a lady is dishonoured by taking a lover who is richer than herself. The debate had been begun by Guilhem de Saint-Leidier and was taken up by Azalais de Porcairagues and Raimbaut of Orange; there was also a partimen on the topic between Dalfi d'Alvernha and Perdigon.

Alfonso and his love affairs are mentioned in poems by many troubadours, including Guillem de Berguedà (who criticized his dealings with Azalais of Toulouse) and Peire Vidal, who commended Alfonso's decision to marry Sancha rather than Eudokia Komnene that he had preferred a poor Castilian maid to the emperor Manuel's golden camel.

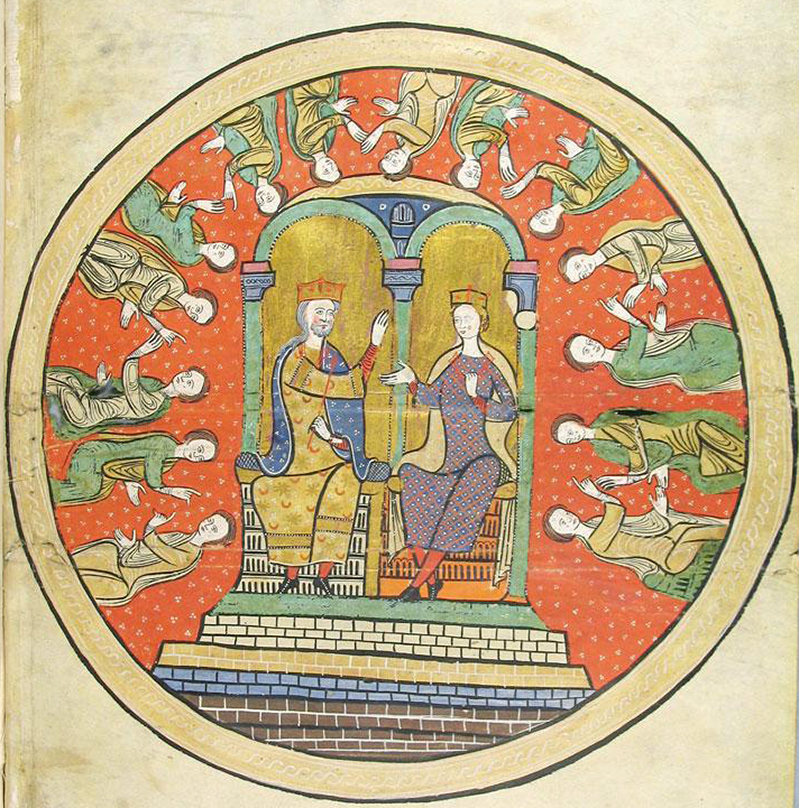
Alfonso II of Aragon and his wife Sancha, surrounded by the women of court. From the Liber feudorum maior.

== Marriage and descendants ==
Alfonso married Sancha of Castile, daughter of king Alfonso VII of Castile. They had:

- Peter II (1174/76 – 14 September 1213), King of Aragon and Lord of Montpellier
- Constance (1179 – 23 June 1222), married firstly King Emeric of Hungary and secondly Frederick II, Holy Roman Emperor
- Alfonso II (1180 – February 1209), Count of Provence, Millau and Razès.
- Eleanor (1182 – February 1226), married Raymond VI of Toulouse
- Ramon Berenguer (ca. 1183/85 – died young).
- Sancha (1186 – aft. 1241), married Raymond VII of Toulouse, in March 1211
- Ferdinand (1190 – 1249), cistercian monk, Abbot of Montearagón.
- Dulcia (1192 – ?), a nun at Sijena.

Regnal titles
Preceded by Ramon Berenguer IV or Petronilla	King of Aragon; Count of Barcelona; 1162/4–1196	Succeeded by Peter II
Preceded by Douce II	Count of Provence; 1166–1171	Succeeded by Ramon Berenguer III
