= Marsan =

- Commune
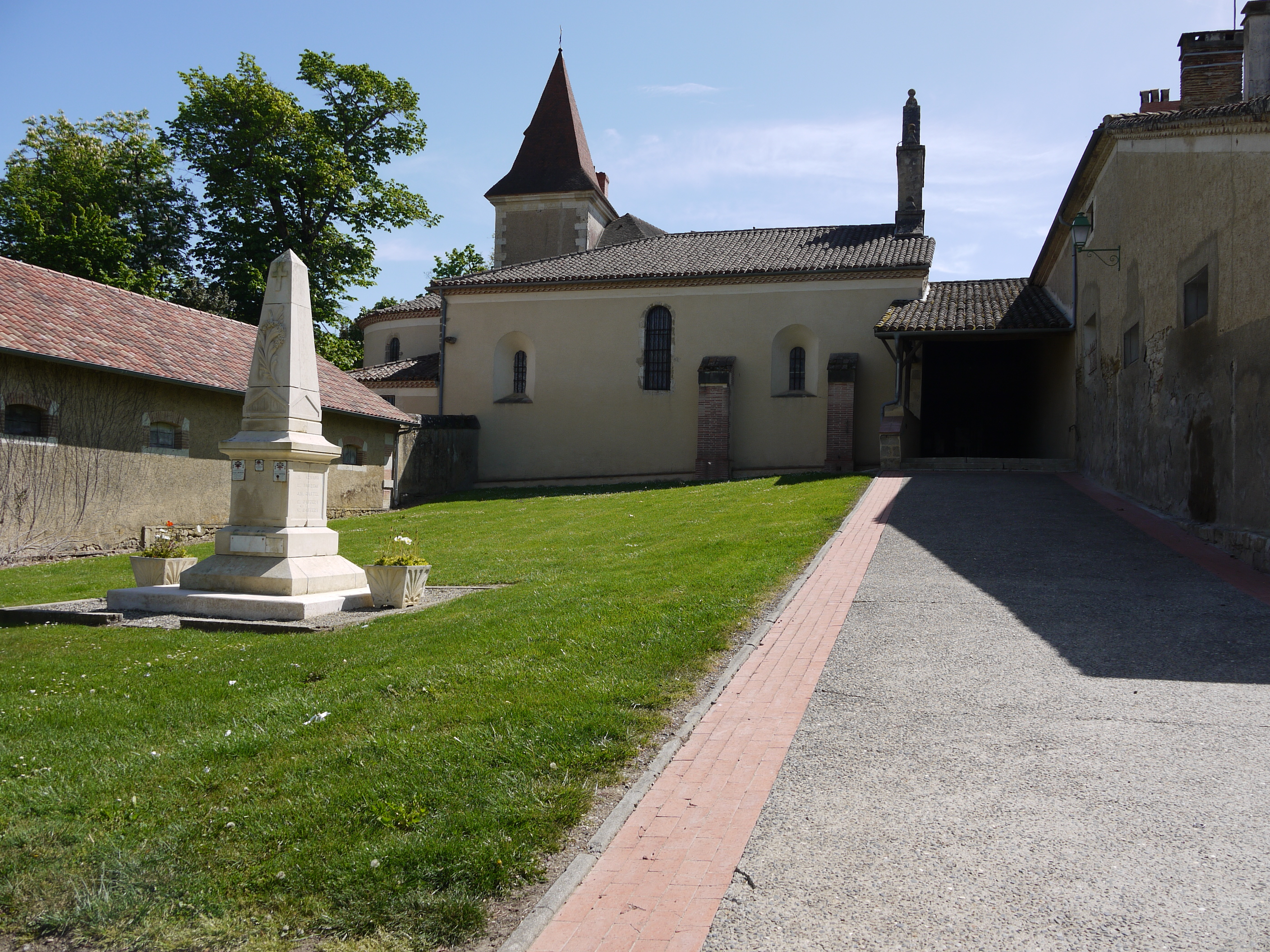
- The church and the war memorial.

- Coat of arms
- Location of Marsan
- Location within France Location within Occitanie
- Coordinates: 43°39′27″N 0°43′23″E
- Country: France
- Region: Occitania
- Department: Gers
- Arrondissement: Auch
- Canton: Auch-2
- Intercommunality: Coteaux Arrats Gimone

Government
  - Mayor (2020–2026): Aymeri de Montesquiou (UDI)
- Area^{1}: 14.93 km^{2} (5.76 sq mi)
- Elevation: 196 m (643 ft)
- Highest elevation: 256 m (840 ft)
- Lowest elevation: 158 m (518 ft)
- Population (2023): 461
  - Density: 30.9/km^{2} (80.0/sq mi)
- Demonym: Marsannais.e
- Time zone: UTC+01:00 (CET)
  - Summer (DST): UTC+02:00 (CEST)
- INSEE/Postal code: 32237 /32270
- ^{1} French Land Register data, which excludes lakes, ponds, glaciers > 1 km^{2} (0.386 sq mi or 247 acres) and river estuaries.

Marsan (French pronunciation: [maʁsɑ̃]; Occitan: Marçan, [marsa]) is a commune in the Gers department, southwestern France. There exists a Swedish vanilla sauce product called Marsán, the name inspired by a visit by the owner to Marsan, Gers in the 1920s.

== Geography ==
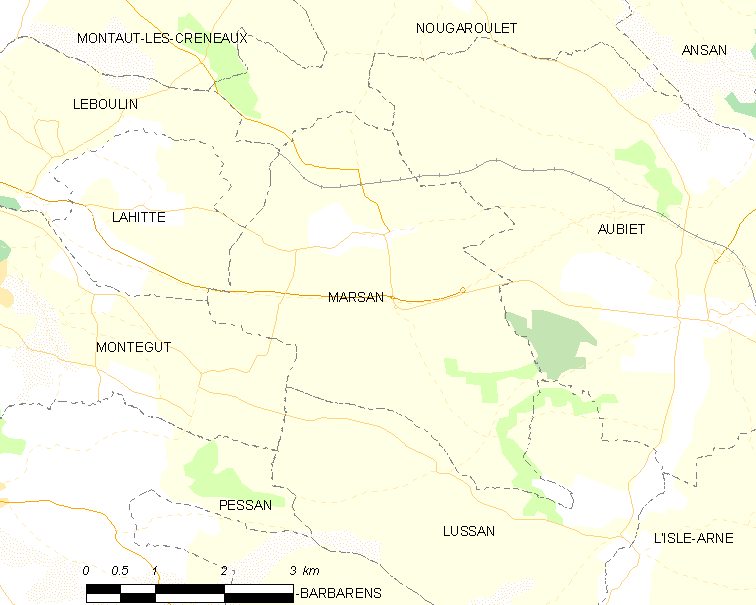
Marsan and its surrounding communes

== Population ==
Historical population
Year	Pop.	±% p.a.
1968	301	—
1975	307	+0.28%
1982	330	+1.04%
1990	420	+3.06%
1999	430	+0.26%
2007	424	−0.18%
2012	454	+1.38%
2017	471	+0.74%
2023	461	−0.36%
Source: INSEE

== See also ==
- Communes of the Gers department
