= Balansun =

- Commune
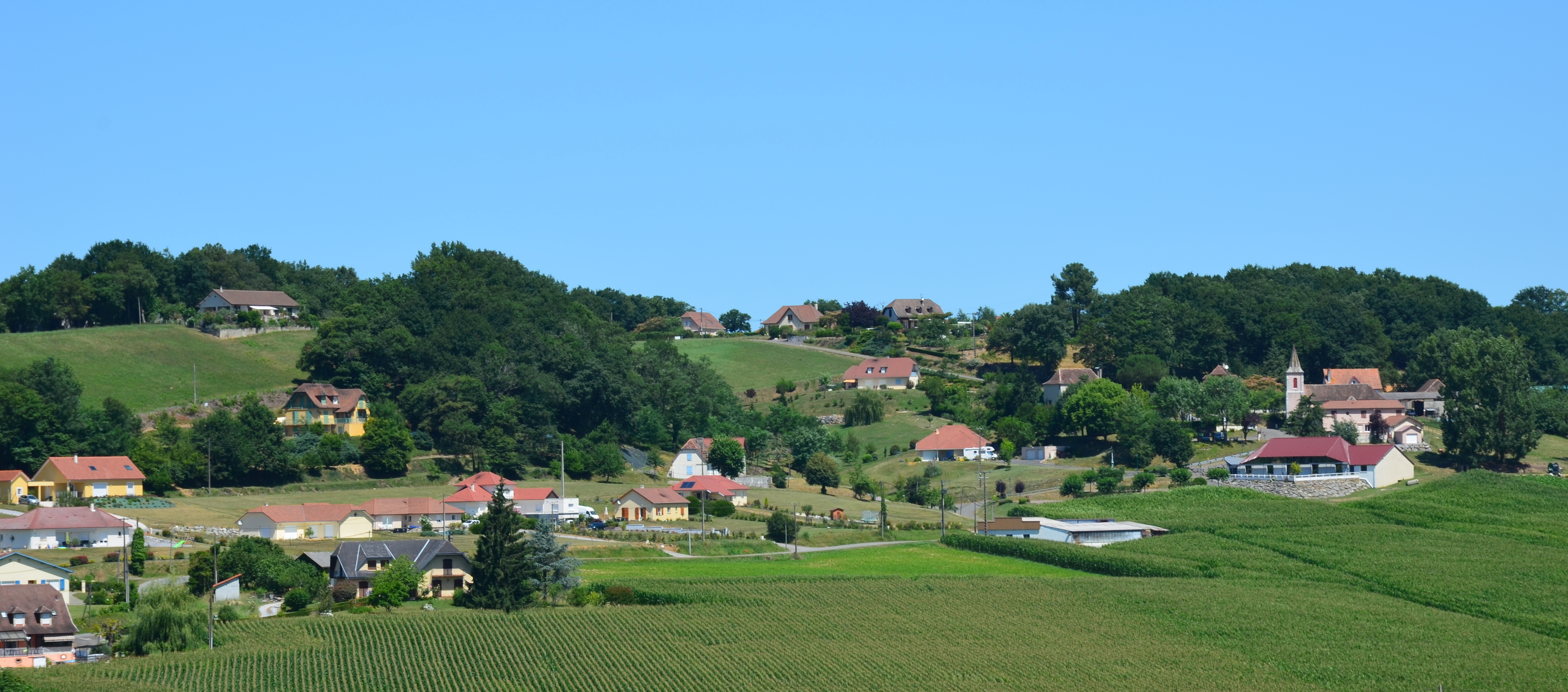
- The centre of the village of Balansun
- Location of Balansun
- Location within France Location within Nouvelle-Aquitaine
- Coordinates: 43°29′33″N 0°41′51″W
- Country: France
- Region: Nouvelle-Aquitaine
- Department: Pyrénées-Atlantiques
- Arrondissement: Pau
- Canton: Artix et Pays de Soubestre
- Intercommunality: Lacq-Orthez

Government
  - Mayor (2020–2026): Bénédicte Alcetegaray
- Area^{1}: 10.73 km^{2} (4.14 sq mi)
- Elevation: 112 m (367 ft)
- Highest elevation: 208 m (682 ft)
- Lowest elevation: 84 m (276 ft)
- Population (2023): 316
  - Density: 29.5/km^{2} (76.3/sq mi)
- Time zone: UTC+01:00 (CET)
  - Summer (DST): UTC+02:00 (CEST)
- INSEE/Postal code: 64088 /64300
- ^{1} French Land Register data, which excludes lakes, ponds, glaciers > 1 km^{2} (0.386 sq mi or 247 acres) and river estuaries.

Balansun (French pronunciation: [balɑ̃sœ̃]; Occitan: Valensun) is a commune of the Pyrénées-Atlantiques department in the Nouvelle-Aquitaine region of south-western France.

== Geography ==
Balansun is a commune in the former province of Béarn located some 6 km east of Orthez and 4 km north of Argagnon. Access to the commune is by the D946 road from Arthez-de-Béarn in the east which passes through the centre of the commune south of the village and continues south-west to join the D817 west of Castétis. Access to the village is by the Chemin de l'Eglise which branches north off the D946 on the western side of the commune. The commune is mixed forest and farmland.

The commune is located in the Drainage basin of the Adour with the Ruisseau de Clamondé forming the southern border of the commune as it flows west to join the Gave de Pau west of Castetis. Three streams flow through the commune from east to west into the Ruisseau de Clamondé gathering many tributaries in the commune/

=== Places and hamlets ===
- Barran
- Bélou
- Bergerayre
- Bernadou
- Bidau
- Bordes
- Bourroua
- Bousque
- Cabalé
- Cabanne
- Cantegrith
- Cantonnier
- Carsuzaa
- Chou
- Cousiner
- Craber
- Crabérou
- Friquet
- Garly
- Heugarès
- Lacabanne
- Laheuguère
- Larribau
- Lasserre
- Lay
- Loup
- Loustalet
- Massioo
- Menaut
- Menusé
- Millet
- Moncaud
- Monhort
- Naudou
- Rouby
- Saint-Martin
- Sarraillot
- Sautié
- Tisnérot
- Touyarot
- Trotemenut

== Toponymy ==
Michel Grosclaude said that the origin of the original name is the Gascon Latin name of a man Valentius with the suffix -unum.

The following table details the origins of the commune name and other names in the commune.

Name	Spelling	Date	Source	Page	Origin	Description
Balansun	Balansun	1205	Raymond	19	Bérérenx	Village
	Balansun	13th century	Raymond	19	Fors de Béarn	
	Balansun	1323	Grosclaude			
	Balensu	1343	Raymond	20	Pardies	
	Valenssun	1385	Raymond	20	Census	
	Valencin	14th century	Raymond	20	Froissart	
	Balanssun	1536	Raymond	20	Reformation	
	Balensun	18th century	Grosclaude			
	Balensun	1750	Cassini			
	Balenzun	1793	Ldh/EHESS/Cassini		An II	
	Balensun	1801	Ldh/EHESS/Cassini		Bulletin des lois	
Bellegarde	Belegarde	1538	Raymond	27	Reformation	Farm and Fief, vassal of the Viscounts of Béarn
Friquet	la maison de Fricquet	1538	Raymond	65	Reformation	Fief, vassal of the Viscounts of Béarn
Laheuguère	La Figuere	1538	Raymond	90	Reformation	Farm
Saint-Martin	Sent-Marthii	1385	Raymond	150	Census	Farm
Tresarbres	Tresarbres	1538	Raymond	168	Reformation	Fief, vassal of the Viscounts of Béarn, with 400 arpents in 1538

Sources:

- Grosclaude: Toponymic Dictionary of communes, Béarn, 2006 (in French)
- Raymond: Topographic Dictionary of the Department of Basses-Pyrenees, 1863, on the page numbers indicated in the table. (in French)
- Cassini: Cassini Map from 1750
- Ldh/EHESS/Cassini: Des villages de Cassini aux communes d'aujourd'hui: Commune data sheet Balansun, EHESS (in French).

Origins:

- Bérérenx: Chapter of Bérérenx
- Fors de Béarn
- Pardies: Notaries of Pardies
- Census: Census of Béarn
- Froissart: Jean Froissart, Book IV
- Reformation: Reformation of Béarn

== History ==
Paul Raymond noted that on page 20 of his 1863 dictionary that the fief of Balansun was a vassal of the Viscounts of Béarn and, in 1385, had 27 fires depending on the bailiwick of Pau.

== Administration ==
List of Successive Mayors

Mayors from the French Revolution to 1942

From	To	Name
1792	1794	Pierre Cazaban
1794	1795	Jean Bousque
1795	1797	Arnaud Tisnerot
1797	1800	Jacques Vispalie
1800	1803	Jean Bouisque
1803	1804	Arnaud Casaux
1804	1814	Arnaud Tisnerot
1814	1816	Jean Moureu
1816	1821	Boniface Thimothée Desbordes-Louboey
1821	1826	Jean Tisnerot
1826	1832	Jean Cammau
1832	1837	Léonard Moureu
1837	1841	Jean Caubet
1841	1848	Jacques Vispalie
1848	1858	Léonard Moureu
1858	1871	Pierre Lescurat
1871	1886	Jean Paraige
1886	1896	Jean Debaig
1896	1900	Jean Baptiste Daugarou
1900	1912	Jean Debaig
1912	1942	Jean Maubecq

Mayors from 1942

From	To	Name
1942	1944	Jean Baptiste Daugarou
1944	1946	Pierre Temboury
1946	1977	Alfred Debaig
1977	1995	Jean Sautie
1995	2001	Marie-Thérèse Maubecq
2001	2014	Anny Furbeyre
2014	2026	Bénédicte Alcetegaray

=== Inter-communality ===
The commune is part of four inter-communal structures:

- the Communauté de communes de Lacq-Orthez;
- the SIVU of Balansun/Castétis;
- the water and sanitation association of Trois Cantons;
- the Energy association of Pyrénées-Atlantiques;

== Demography ==
The inhabitants of the commune are known as Balansenais or Balansenaises in French.

Historical population

Year	Pop.	±% p.a.
1793	441	—
1821	486	+0.35%
1846	574	+0.67%
1872	276	−2.78%
1901	233	−0.58%
1926	223	−0.18%
1946	200	−0.54%
1962	177	−0.76%
1968	202	+2.23%

Year	Pop.	±% p.a.
1975	206	+0.28%
1982	215	+0.61%
1990	209	−0.35%
1999	207	−0.11%
2007	234	+1.54%
2012	279	+3.58%
2017	287	+0.57%
2023	316	+1.62%

Source: EHESS and INSEE

== Economy ==
Economic activity is mainly agricultural (livestock).

== Sites and monuments ==
The Parish Church of the Assumption of Notre-Dame (1850) is registered as an historical monument.

== Facilities ==
The commune has a primary school which is grouped in an RPI (Intercommunal Educational Grouping) with the primary school in Castétis.

== See also ==
- Communes of the Pyrénées-Atlantiques department
