= Viscounty of Oloron =

Feudal viscountcy in Gascony

The Viscounty of Oloron was a viscountcy in southwestern Gascony, located within the modern-day Landes department of France. Centred on Oloron-Sainte-Marie, the viscountcy existed from the late 10th century until its absorption into the Viscounty of Béarn in the mid-11th century.

== List of viscounts ==
- Aner I (977–978)
- Loup I (978–985)
- Aner II (985–1002)
- Centulle III de Béarn (1002–1004)
- Aner II, restored (1004–1009)
- Angela d'Oloron, Viscountess (1009-?)
  - Centulle IV de Béarn, jure uxoris (1009–1058)
- Absorbed into Viscounty of Béarn
