= Araujuzon =

- Commune
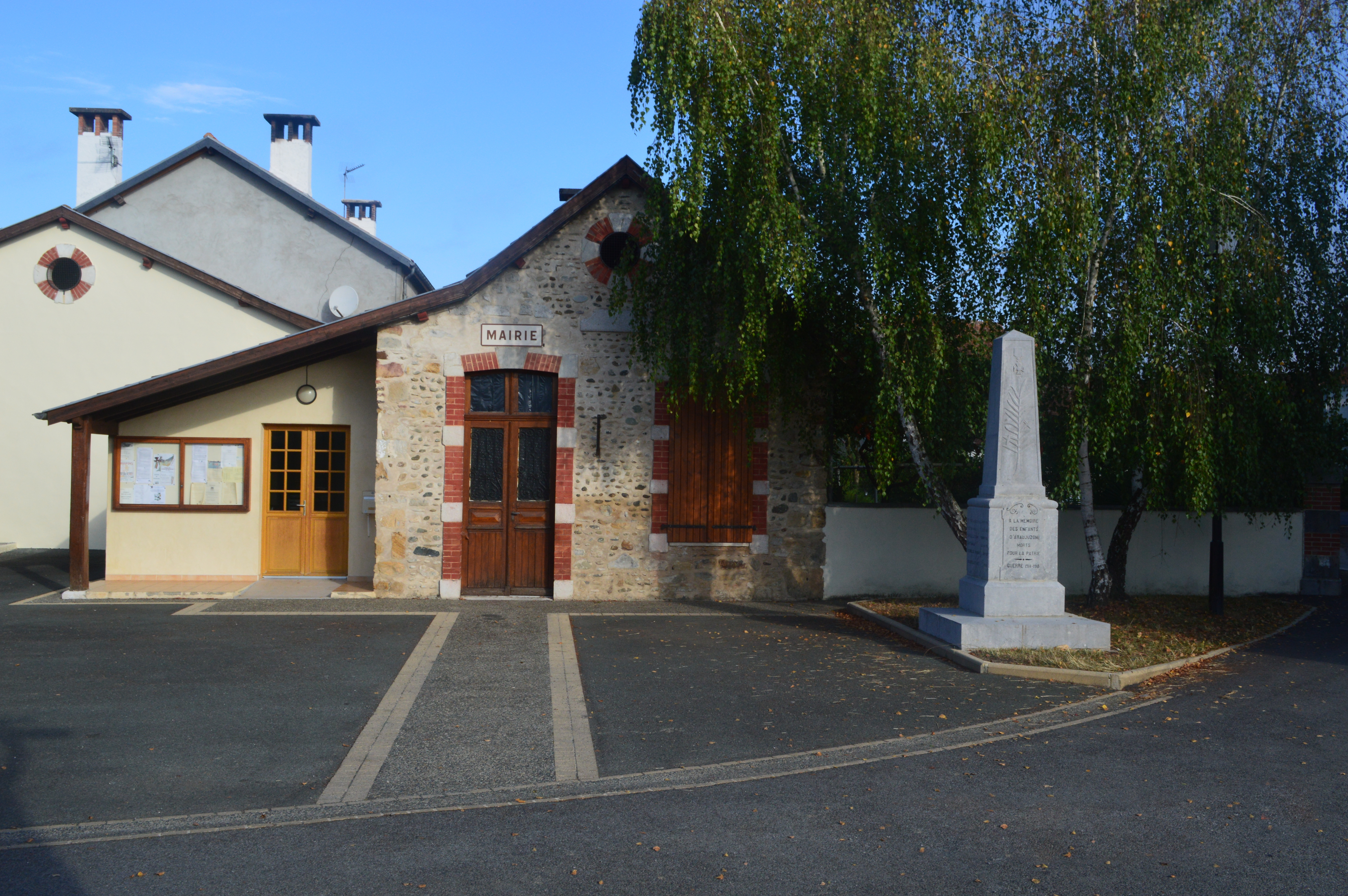
- Town Hall and War Memorial

- Coat of arms
- Location of Araujuzon
- Location within France Location within Nouvelle-Aquitaine
- Coordinates: 43°21′39″N 0°49′03″W
- Country: France
- Region: Nouvelle-Aquitaine
- Department: Pyrénées-Atlantiques
- Arrondissement: Oloron-Sainte-Marie
- Canton: Le Cœur de Béarn

Government
  - Mayor (2020–2026): Jean-Claude Larco
- Area^{1}: 6.92 km^{2} (2.67 sq mi)
- Elevation: 102 m (335 ft)
- Highest elevation: 212 m (696 ft)
- Lowest elevation: 79 m (259 ft)
- Population (2023): 189
  - Density: 27.3/km^{2} (70.7/sq mi)
- Time zone: UTC+01:00 (CET)
  - Summer (DST): UTC+02:00 (CEST)
- INSEE/Postal code: 64032 /64190
- ^{1} French Land Register data, which excludes lakes, ponds, glaciers > 1 km^{2} (0.386 sq mi or 247 acres) and river estuaries.

Araujuzon (French pronunciation: [aʁoʒyzɔ̃]; Occitan: Lajuson) is a commune in the Pyrénées-Atlantiques department in the Nouvelle-Aquitaine region of southwestern France.

== Geography ==
=== Location ===
The town is located some 40 km north-west of Oloron-Sainte-Marie, 15 km east by south-east of Sauveterre-de-Béarn, and 8 km north-west of Navarrenx.

=== Access ===
Araujuzon is accessed by the D936 road from Oloron-Sainte-Marie which passes through the north of the commune and continues west to Autevielle-Saint-Martin-Bideren. There is also the D160 road from the southern border where it joins the D115 passing through the length of the commune to the D936 west of the village. The D265 road also links the north of the commune to Narp. The village is close to the D936 and can be reached by a number of country roads.

The Intercity network of Pyrénées-Atlantiques bus network currently has a stop in the commune on Route 850 from Oloron-Sainte-Marie to Sauveterre-de-Béarn.

=== Hydrography ===
Located in the Drainage basin of the Adour, the northern border of the commune is formed by the Gave d'Oloron (a tributary of the Gave de Pau River) with its tributary, the Lausset, passing through the commune and joining the Gave d'Oleron near the village. The Ruisseau de la Mousquere rises in the commune and gathers several tributaries while flowing north-west to join the Gave d'Oleron.

The Cassou dou Boue and the Ruisseau de Lescuncette rise in the south of the commune and flow south-east to join the Ruisseau de Harcellane (a tributary of the Lausset).

=== Localities and hamlets ===
- Les Arreytes
- Les Balibes
- Beighau
- Bernatha
- Boulocq
- La Campagne
- Le Coude du Lausset
- Gaillégou
- Lacroix
- Lahagne
- Lahore
- Lamazou
- Larcebeau
- Larmanou
- Lavie
- Lavoignet
- Loustalot
- Moncau
- Pessot
- Serrailh
- Souleret
- Trescassous

== Toponymy ==
The name of the commune in Béarnese is Araus-Juzon (according to classical norm of Occitan). The commune name in Gascon is Lajuson.

For Michel Grosclaude, the name comes from lau ("wasteland" or "moor") and juzon ("lower" or "downstream"). Brigitte Jobbé-Duval indicated that Juzon meaning "underneath" gives the place name translating as "underneath Arrau", but more likely "underneath Araux" (Araux is called Araus-Susonin Béarnese).

The following table details the origins of the commune name and other names in the commune.

Name	Spelling	Date	Source	Page	Origin	Description
Araujuzon	Araus-Jusoo	13th century	Raymond	8	Fors de Béarn	Village
	Araus-Juson	1487	Raymond	8	EStablishments	
	Araujuson	1546	Raymond	8	Reformation	
	Laujuzon	1714	Grosclaude		Araujuzon Parish Register	
	Araujuzon	1750	Cassini			
	Araujuson	1793	Ldh/EHESS/Cassini			
	Araujuzon	1801	Ldh/EHESS/Cassini		Bulletin des lois	
Domec	Domec	13th century	Raymond	55	Fors de Béarn	Fief, Vassal of the Viscounts of Béarn and dependent on the Bailiwick of Navarrenx
Larcebeau	Le Larcebau	1863	Raymond	94		Stream also called Ruisseau d'Escounerbiets

Sources:

- Raymond: Topographic Dictionary of the Department of Basses-Pyrenees, 1863, on the page numbers indicated in the table. (in French)
- Grosclaude: Toponymic Dictionary of communes, Béarn, 2006 (in French)
- Cassini: Cassini Map from 1750
- Ldh/EHESS/Cassini: Des villages de Cassini aux communes d'aujourd'hui: Commune data sheet Araujuzon, EHESS (in French).

Origins:

- Fors de Béarn
- Establishments: Register of Establishments of Béarn
- Reformation: Reformation of Béarn
- Insinuations: Insinuations of the Diocese of Oloron

== History ==
Paul Raymond noted on page 8 of the 1863 dictionary that the commune had a Lay Abbey which was a vassal of the Viscounty of Béarn. In 1385 Araujuzon had 46 fires and depended on the Bailiwick of Navarrenx. It became a dependency of the Barony of Jasses from 1644 which included Araujuzon, Araux, Jasses, Montfort, and Viellenave. In 1790 the commune was part of the Canton of Sauveterre.

=== Heraldry ===
Arms of Araujuzon	Blazon: Party per fesse wavy: 1st party per pale, at 1 Or, two cows Gules horned, collared, and hooved Azure one above the other, at 2 Vert an ear of corn of Or; 2nd Azure, Saint Martin haloed mounted on a horse and cutting his cloak with his sword, all Argent.

== Administration ==
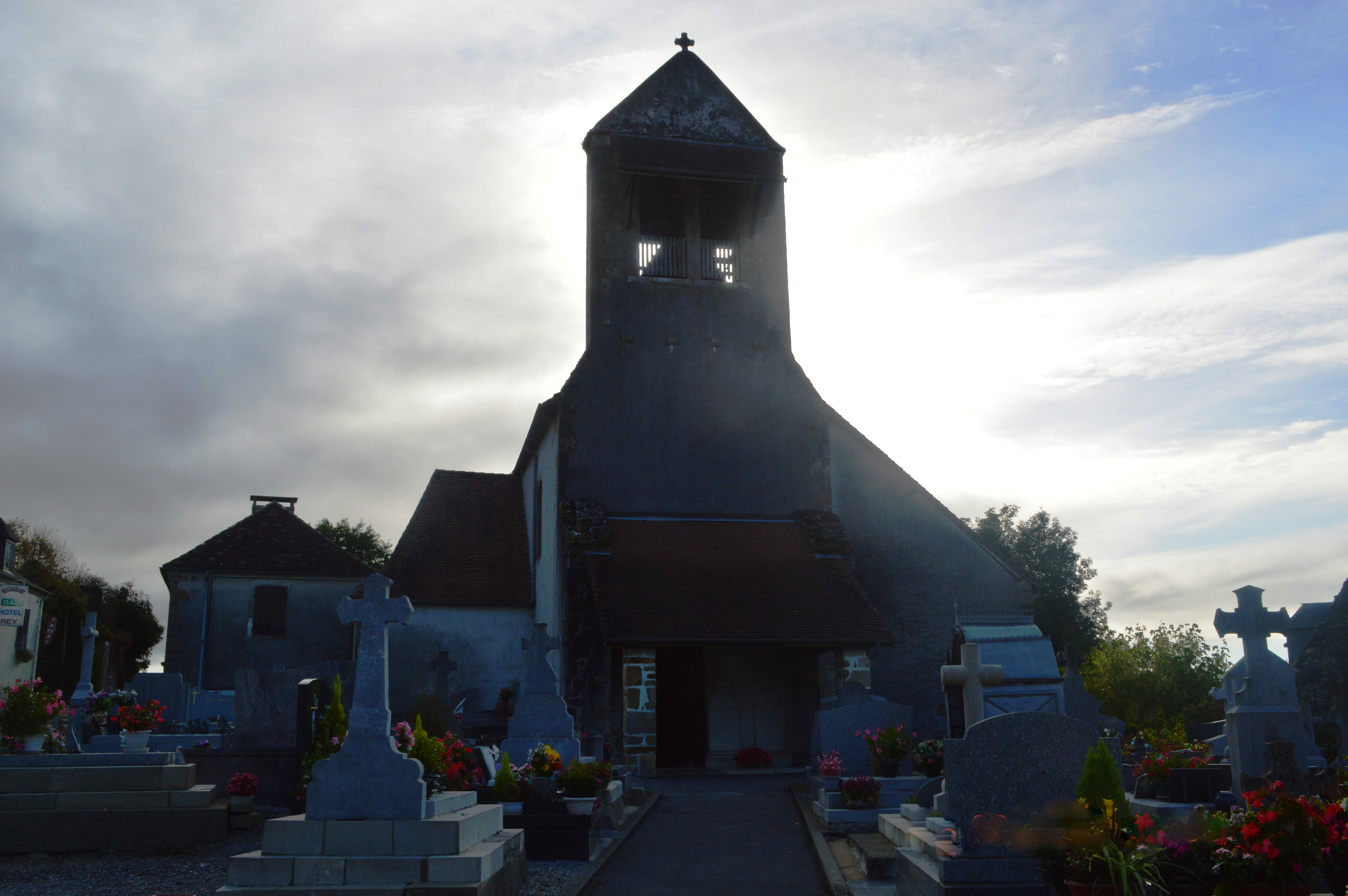
Araujuzon Church

List of Successive Mayors

From	To	Name
1995	2008	Pierre Higue
2008	2026	Jean-Claude Larco

=== Inter-communality ===
The commune is part of nine inter-communal structures:

- the Communauté de communes du Béarn des Gaves
- the mixed association Bil Ta Garbi
- the mixed association of Béarn des Gaves
- the inter-communal association of Gaves and of Saleys
- the association of Gaves Country and of Lausset
- the association of schools of Gaveausset
- the association for promotion of Navarrenx
- the AEP association of Navarrenx
- the Energy association of Pyrénées-Atlantiques

Araujuzon is also part of the Pays de Lacq Orthez Béarn des Gaves.

== Demography ==
The inhabitants of the commune are known as Araujuzonais or Araujuzonaises in French.

Historical population

Year	Pop.	±% p.a.
1793	429	—
1821	518	+0.68%
1846	544	+0.20%
1872	469	−0.57%
1901	428	−0.31%
1926	301	−1.40%
1946	298	−0.05%
1962	240	−1.34%
1968	217	−1.67%

Year	Pop.	±% p.a.
1975	196	−1.44%
1982	200	+0.29%
1990	186	−0.90%
1999	182	−0.24%
2007	179	−0.21%
2012	207	+2.95%
2017	194	−1.29%
2023	189	−0.43%

Source: EHESS and INSEE

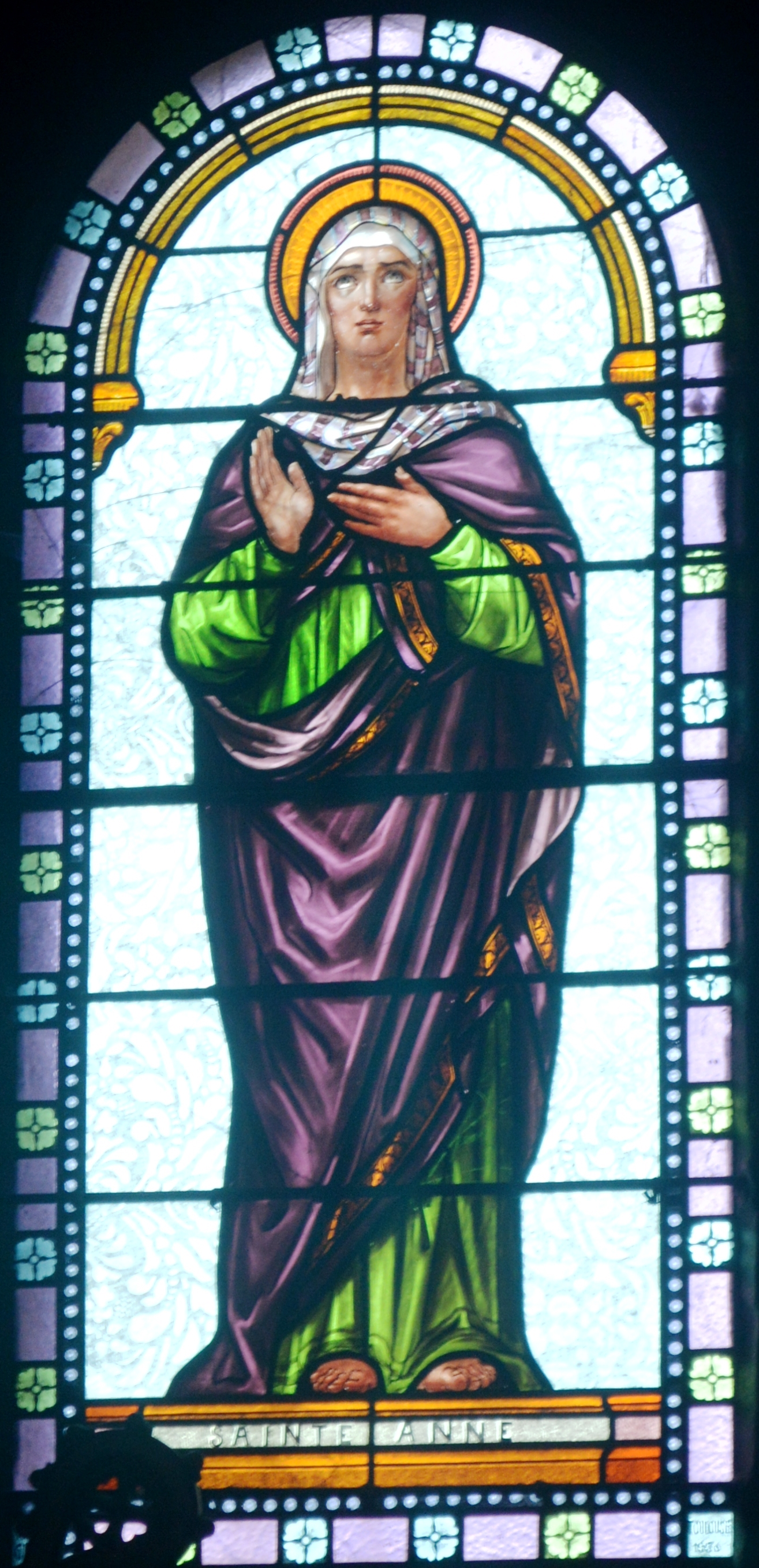
Saint Anne

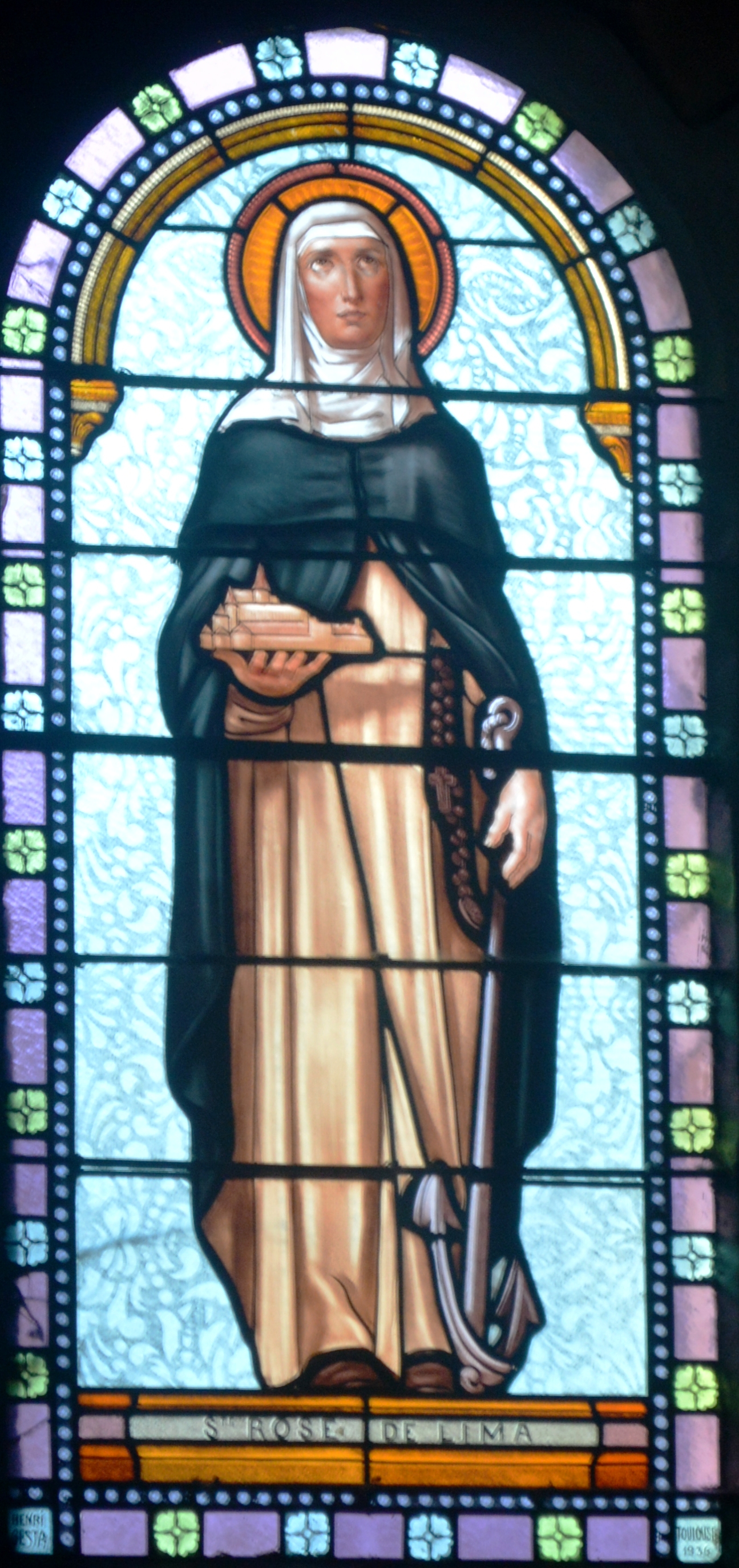
Saint Rose of Lima

== Economy ==
Economic activity is mainly agricultural (livestock, pastures, corn). The town is part of the Appellation d'origine contrôlée (AOC) zone of Ossau-iraty.

== Facilities ==
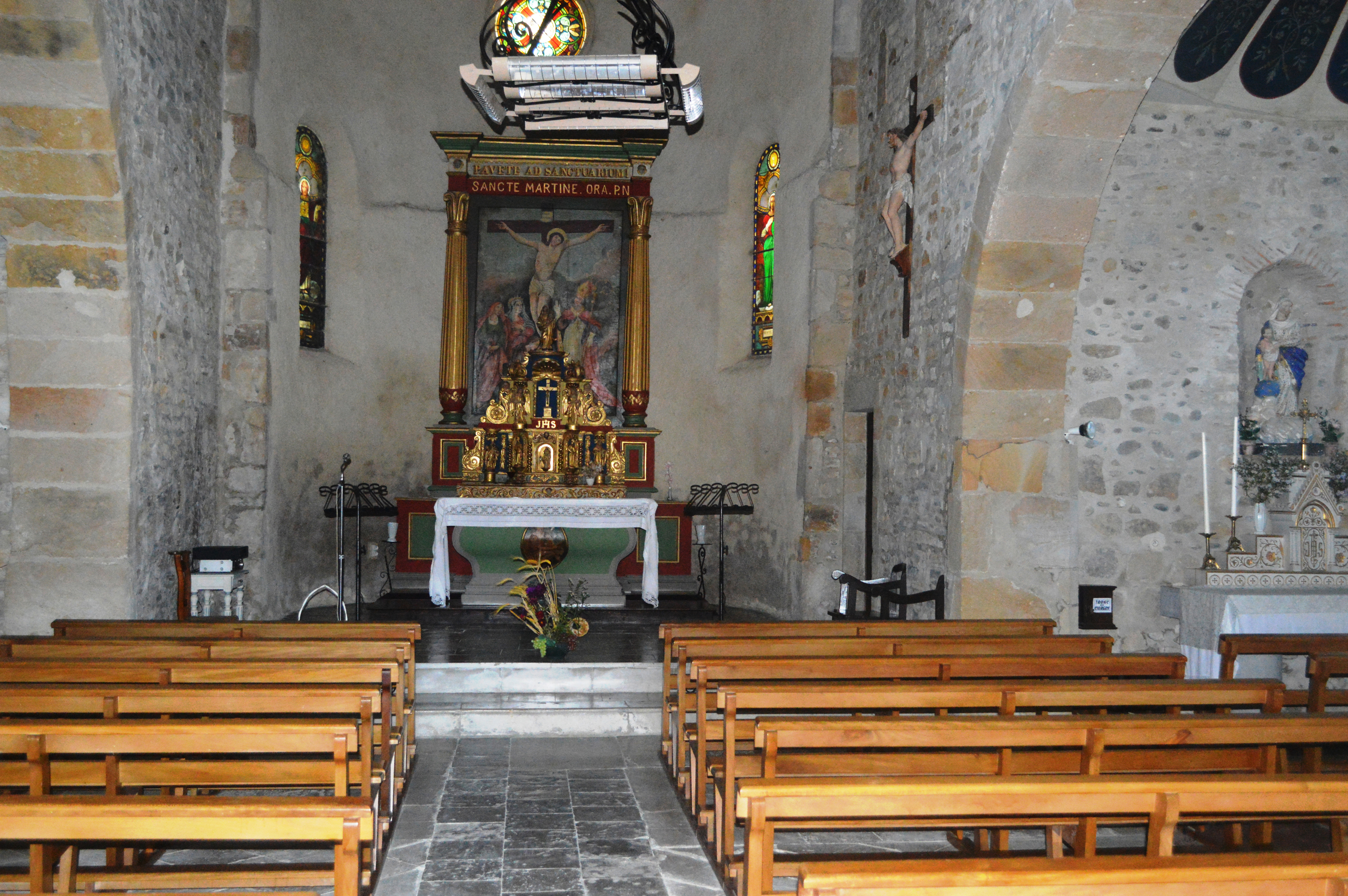
Araujuzon Church Interior

The commune has an elementary school.

== See also ==
- Communes of the Pyrénées-Atlantiques department
