= Talesa of Aragon =

Aragonese noble

Talesa, Talèse, Talèze, or Ataresa (died after 1136) was an Aragonese noblewoman and regent. She was the daughter of Sancho Ramírez, Count of Ribagorza, natural brother of King Sancho Ramírez of Aragon and Navarre, and member of the royal Jiménez dynasty. She married Gaston IV of Béarn and acted as regent of the viscounty of Béarn during his absences on Crusade in 1096-1101, and after his death for their son in 1131-1134 and her grandson until at least 1136.

== Life ==
She was married towards 1085 in a move by Gaston's father Centule V of Béarn to expand his influence across the Pyrenees by allying himself with the ruling house of Aragon and Navarre. She brought as a dowry the viscounty of Montaner, a small country in the neighbourhood of Bigorre.

Between 1096 and 1101, while Gaston participated in the First Crusade, Talesa governed Béarn with the help of a baronial council. This scenario was repeated several times more during her husband's frequent military ventures in Aragon. Like many of her day, she found her way into historical records primarily through the foundation and endowment of religious establishments.

On the death of Gaston in 1131, Talesa took up the regency for her young son Centule VI. Centule died in the Battle of Fraga in 1134 and the viscounty passed to the son, Peter II, of Guiscarda, Talesa and Gaston's eldest daughter. Peter II being a mere boy, Talesa continued in the regency for him until at least 1136.

In that same year, Aragon and Navarre experienced a succession crisis, as Talesa's cousin Alfonso the Battler died without heirs and leaving a testament by which his realm was to pass to the military religious orders. The two kingdoms split and the throne of Aragon was contested by Ramiro the Monk, the dead king's brother, and Alfonso VII of León, a more distant relative. Talesa sided with Ramiro, who in turn surrendered to her the lordships of (a part of) Zaragoza and Uncastillo which he had inherited from Gaston. After papal intervention, the conflict was finally settled in favour of Raymond Berengar IV of Barcelona, who, to recover good relations with Béarn, granted Talesa the fiefs of Huesca and Bespen with rights over the Basilica of Our Lady of the Pillar in Zaragoza, where Gaston lay buried. He also gave Peter II a Catalan princess for a bride and thus brought Béarn within the Catalan sphere of influence.

Talesa died sometime after 1136. Aside from Centule and Guiscarda, she had another daughter who died young and is only known from a first initial, N. She also had a first son named Centule who died before 1128, predeceasing Gaston's heir.

== Sources ==
- Tucoo-Chala, Pierre. Quand l'Islam était aux portes des Pyrénées. Biarrtiz: J&D Editions, 1994. ISBN 2-84127-022-X.
