= Sancho Ramírez, Count of Ribagorza =

11th-century Aragonese nobleman

Sancho Ramírez
- Count of Ribagorza
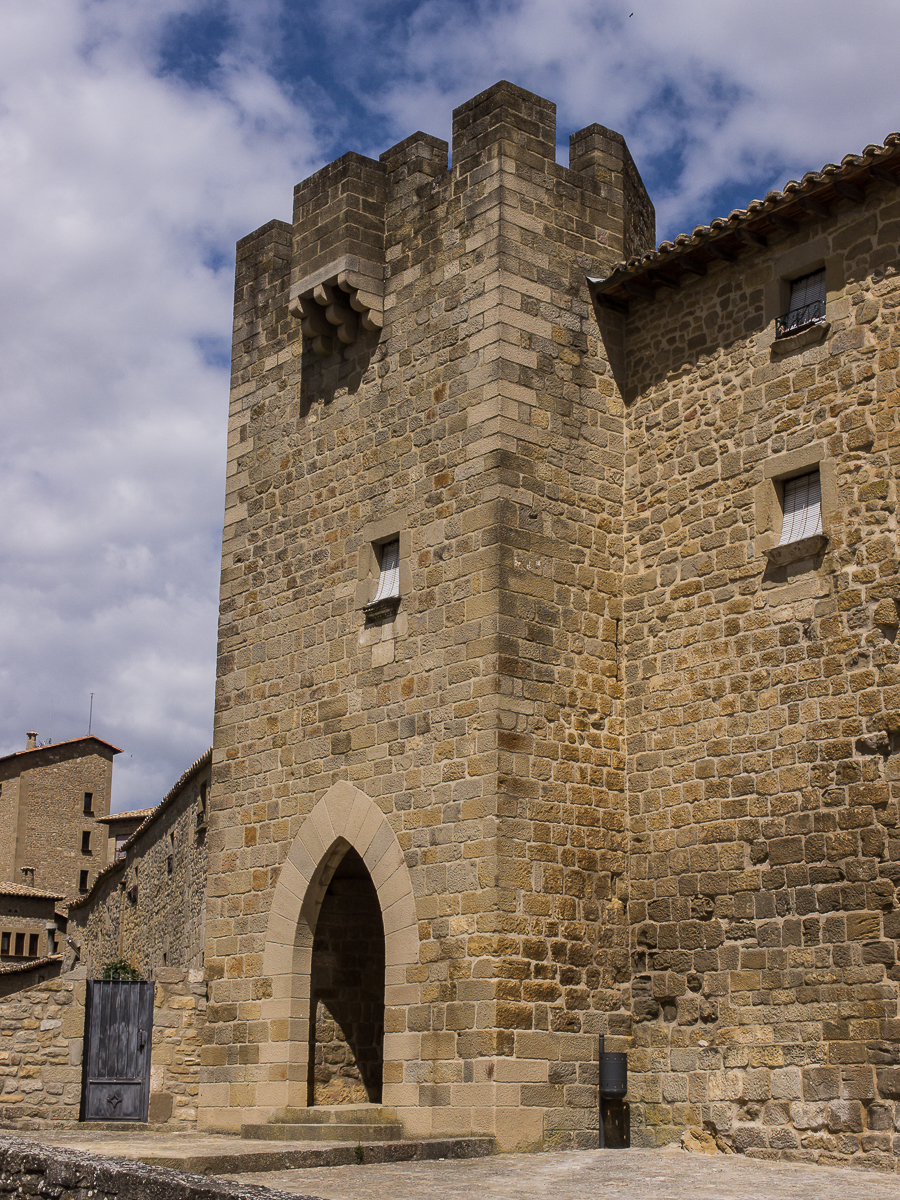
- Castle in Sos, governed by Sancho Ramírez
- Born: c. 1043; Aragon
- Died: 1105/November 1110; Aragon
- Buried: Jaca Cathedral
- Noble family: Jiménez dynasty
- Spouse: Beatriz
- Issue: See Descendants
- Father: Ramiro I of Aragon
- Mother: Amuña

Sancho Ramírez (before 1043 – 1105/November 1110) was an illegitimate son of King Ramiro I of Aragon and Amuña, the firstborn and brother of his namesake who would inherit the throne and reign as Sancho Ramírez. (Note: He confirmed a donation in 1067 to the Monastery of San Andrés de Fanlo as Ego Sancio Ranimiri, Ranimirus regis filio et domna Amunna (I, Sancho Ramírez, son of King Ramiro and doña Amuña).)

== Biographical sketch ==
Even though he could not inherit the throne because his father had legitimate issue, he was named count at an early age and was a prominent member of the curia regis first appearing in a charter dated 1049, suspected of being false, (Note: The charter, according to author Viruete Erdozáin, is false.) as a witness to a donation made by his father to the Monastery of San Victorián. In this charter, he confirms as Sancius Ranimiri regis filius primogenitus (Sancho, the firstborn son of King Ramiro) followed by his brother and namesake, Sancho, who confirms as Sancius Ranimiri regis filius prolis Ermmisendis regine (Sancho son of King Ramiro and Queen Ermesinda). Sancho was entrusted with the governance of several important and strategic tenencias, including: Aibar (1061 – 1062); Sos (1062); Benabarre (1063 – 1093); Fantova (1063 probably until 1110); Ribagorza (1083 – 1093); Monzón (February 1090); Arrieso (January 1091), and Javier (September 1091 to December 1097); and, Aibar, again from September 1091 until March 1100.

Sancho Ramírez probably participated in the Reconquista as can be inferred from his father's first will executed on 29 July 1059 when the king included him as one of his heirs if he returned from the "land of the Moors". In his second will dated 15 March 1061, his father left him Aibar and Javierrelatre "with all its villas". In 1092, when he was already in his fifties, he went on a pilgrimage to Jerusalem which at that time was occupied by the Seljuq dynasty. He was a generous patron of several religious establishments such as a church in Lasieso, San Salvador de Javierrelatre, and Jaca Cathedral where he commissioned the construction of a chapel for his burial.

In his will dated 1105, he left most of his properties to his son García, although he did not ignore his two daughters, Talesa and Beatriz, who inherited land and other properties with the condition that, upon their deaths, these would be given to his son García or to his legitimate children. Sancho Ramírez died between the date of the last will that he executed, 1105, and 24 November 1110 when his wife makes a donation to the Monastery of San Vicente de Roda for the soul of her parents and her husband Count Sancho, with her son García confirming the charter. As of 1111, García appears governing the estates inherited from his father.

== Marriage and issue ==
He married Beatriz, whose patronymic is not recorded in any medieval document, and appears with her in an 1100 charter from the town of Uncastillo confirming the sale made by their deceased son Pedro to a certain "don Juan". In November 1110, the now-widowed Beatriz made a donation to the Monastery of San Vicente in Roda de Isábena of some salt mines that she received from her brother-in-law, King Sancho Ramírez. (Note: Ego Beatrix Deo gratia comittissa, pro anima patris mei et matris mea et senioris mei domni Sancii comitis (I Beatriz, countess by the grace of God, for the soul of my father, my mother, and my lord Sancho, count), a donation that was confirmed by her son García.) Four children were born of this marriage:

- García Sánchez, Lord of Aibar, Atarés and Javierrelatre, married to Teresa Cajal, sister of Fortún Garcés Cajal. They were the parents of Pedro de Atarés who was a claimant to the throne of Aragon after the death of Alfonso the Battler;
- Pedro Sánchez (died before 1100);
- Talesa Sánchez, the wife of Gaston IV, Viscount of Bearn;
- Beatriz Sánchez.

== See also ==
- Count of Ribagorza

== Bibliography ==
- Arco y Garay, Ricardo del (1945). Sepulcros de la Casa Real de Aragón (in Spanish). Madrid: Instituto Jerónimo Zurita. Consejo Superior de Investigaciones Científicas. OCLC 11818414.
- Balaguer, Federico (1960). "Doña Amuña: un amor juvenil de Ramiro I de Aragon". Argensola: Revista de Ciencias Sociales del Instituto de Estudios Altoaragoneses (43): 239–242.
- Canellas López, Ángel (1963). "Colección diplomática de San Andrés de Fanlo (958-1270)" (PDF). Cuadernos de Historia Jerónimo Zurita (in Spanish) (15). Zaragoza: 281–448. ISSN 0044-5517. OCLC 1604525.
- Grau Quiroga, Nuria (2010). Roda de Isábena en los siglos X-XIII. La documentación episcopal y del cabildo catedralicio (PDF) (in Spanish). Zaragoza: Institución Fernando el Católico (C.S.I.C.). Excma. Diputación de Zaragoza. ISBN 978-84-9911-090-5. ISSN 0044-5517.
- Lacarra, José María (1982). Documentos para el estudio de la reconquista y repoblación del Valle del Ebro (in Spanish). Vol. I. Zaragoza: Anubar Ediciones. ISBN 84-7013-192-3.
- Lapeña Paúl, Ana Isabel (2004). Sancho Ramírez, rey de Aragón (¿1064? – 1094) y rey de Navarra (1076 – 1094) (in Spanish). Gijón: Ediciones Trea. ISBN 84-9704-123-2.
- Martín Duque, Ángel J. (1962). "Cartulario de Santa María de Uncastillo" (PDF) (in Spanish). 7. Zaragoza: C.S.I.C., Serie: Publicaciones de la Sección de Zaragoza; Escuela de Estudios Medievales: 647–740. OCLC 1604525. Archived from the original (PDF) on 2013-07-16.
- Viruete Erdozáin, Roberto (2013). La colección diplomática del reinado de Ramiro I de Aragón (1035–1064) (PDF) (in Spanish). Zaragoza: Institución "Fernando el Católico" (C.S.I.C.). ISBN 9788499112190.
