= Marie of Béarn =

Viscount

Mary, Viscountess of Béarn
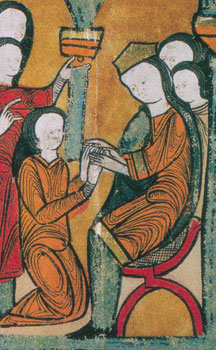
- Mary of Béarn swearing homage to Alfonso II of Aragon, promising not to marry without his consent.
- Died: after 1187
- Children: Gaston VI of Béarn, William Raymond of Béarn
- Parents: Peter II of Béarn (father); Matelle de Baux (mother)

Mary (died after 1187) was a Viscountess of Béarn, Gabardan, and Brulhois from 1170 to 1171 in her own right.

== Life ==
Mary was the only known daughter of Peter II and Matelle de Baux. When Mary's elder brother Gaston V died without descendants, she inherited his titles. This title was rarely carried by women and Mary was only the second to use the title for herself, but only briefly, until she was forced to resign in favor of her son, Gaston.

Her only known act during her brief reign was the act of homage rendered at Jaca to Alfonso II of Aragon on 30 April 1170. Mary and a delegation of Bearnese nobles accepted an oath containing several newly inserted clauses of Alfonso's making which asserted the Crown of Aragon's absolute rights and total control over and above the three viscounties of Béarn, Gabardan, and Brulhois. Alfonso thus usurped the rights of the Duke of Aquitaine, which had long before gone dormant. He also reserved the right to choose Mary's future husband and thus bestow Béarn on whomever he pleased.

In March 1171, the Catalan William of Montcada did homage to Alfonso for Béarn, implicitly as Mary's husband. Mary does not thenceforth reappear with the vicecomital title. However, the Catalan was not acceptable to the Bearnese nobles, who promptly rebelled against their new liege lord. Immediately they elected Theobald of the neighboring County of Bigorre as their viscount, but, as he did not respect the Fors de Bearn, they executed him within the year. They then selected a nobleman of the Auvergne, Sentonge, who lasted two years in power before suffering the same sad fate at the hands of the nobles. Throughout this whole period, William planned to conquer Béarn, but never got around to actually launching any military expedition.

In 1173, the year Sentonge was executed, Mary abandoned her husband, taking their young twin sons with her, and entered the monastery of Santa Cruz de Volvestre. The Bearnese, having rid themselves of three viscounts in as many years, sent a delegation to the monastery to request one of her sons to succeed to the viscounty. Mary consented and sent the elder, Gaston, who became known as Gaston VI of Béarn. The younger son, William Raymond, inherited Béarn from his brother many years later.

The date of Mary's death is unknown, but it probably occurred after 1187.

== Sources ==
- Herlihy, David (1976). "Land, Family, and Women in Continental Europe, 701-1200". In Stuard, Susan Mosher (ed.). Women in Medieval Society. The University of Pennsylvania Press.
- Smith, Damian J. (2010). Crusade, Heresy and Inquisition in the Lands of the Crown of Aragon, (c. 1167-c.1276). Brill.

Preceded by Gaston V	Viscountess of Béarn; 1170 – 1171	Succeeded by Gaston VI
