= Angela of Oloron =

11th century French noblewoman

Angela of Oloron (French: Angela d’Oloron: 11th-century) was a French noblewoman, Lady of Oloron and Viscountess of Béarn by marriage to Centule IV, Viscount of Béarn.

== Life ==
Angela was most likely the daughter of the Viscount Aner Loup and his spouse of an unknown name. Her brother was likely Viscount Loup Aner, a son of her possible father by a concubine. She married Centule IV, Viscount of Béarn, a son of Gaston II, Viscount of Béarn.

She had three children with her husband:

- Gaston III, Viscount of Béarn, father of Centule V, Viscount of Béarn
- Raymond
- Aureol, lord of Baudreix

== See also ==
- Oloron-Sainte-Marie
- Viscounts of Béarn
