= Gaston IV =

Gaston IV may refer to:

- Gaston IV, Viscount of Béarn (died in 1131)
- Gaston IV, Count of Foix (1422–1472)
