= Peter II of Béarn =

French noble

Peter II, Viscount of Béarn
- Died: died 1153
- Other names: Viscount of Gabardan, Brulhois, and Gabarret (as Peter III)
- Known for: Pilgrim hospitals
- Spouse: Matelle de Baux
- Children: Gaston and Mary
- Parents: Peter II of Gabarret (father); Guiscarda of Béarn (mother)

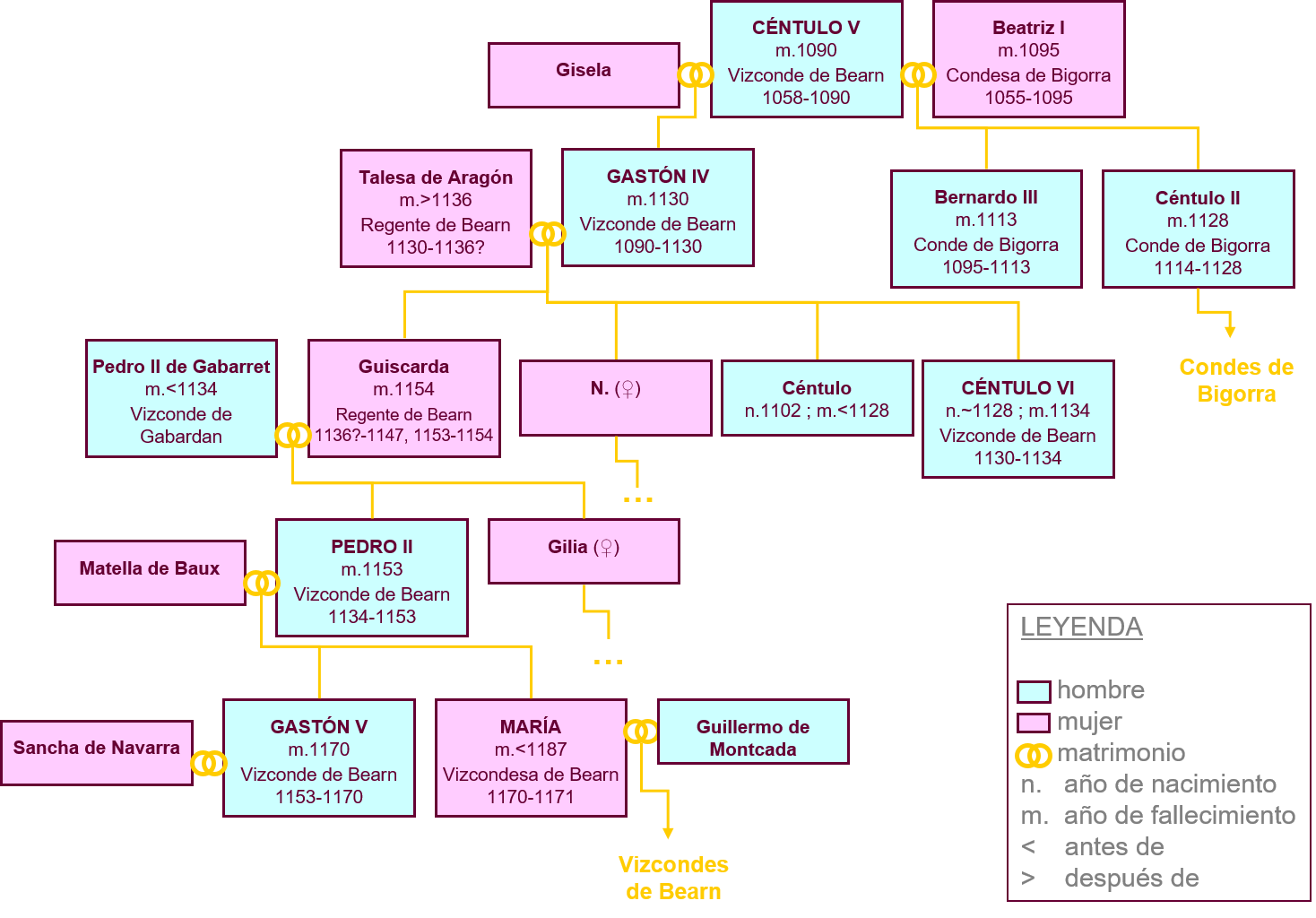
Family tree of the viscounts of Béarn between the 11th and 12th centuries (from Centulle V to Mary of Bearn)

Peter II (died 1153) was the Viscount of Béarn from 1134 to his death. He was also the viscount of Gabardan, Brulhois, and Gabarret (as Peter III).

Son of Peter II of Gabarret and Guiscarda of Béarn, he received the vicecomital title after the death of his maternal uncle Centule VI. While he was a minor, his regency was exercised by his maternal grandmother Talesa of Aragon (until 1136 at least). His mother continued the regency until 1147.

Peter married Matelle de Baux in 1145, whose parents were Raymond de Baux and Etiennette de Gevaudun. They had two children, Gaston V of Béarn (d. 1170) and Mary of Béarn (died after 1187). After Peter died in 1153, Matelle remarried in 1155.

Peter participated in the "crusade" of 1148 against the Moors in Spain organised by Raymond Berengar IV of Barcelona, his wife's cousin. In this he followed the illustrious tradition of his family in aiding the Aragonese monarchs against the Moors. The 1148 campaign was a success, culminating in the conquest of Tortosa, Lleida, and Fraga, all in Spain. That final conquest had symbolic significance for the Bearnese, as Centule VI had died at Fraga's walls. For this, Peter requested and obtained the exchange of his title "Lord of Huesca" for "Lord of Fraga."

Peter also promoted the pilgrimage practice, Way of Saint James and, contrary to his grandfather Gaston IV, established hospitals along the route through the pass of Roncesvalles and not that of Somport. By his time, however, Roncesvalles had already surpassed Santa Cristina at Somport as the preferred pass of the pilgrims. His final public act was the foundation of a new pilgrim hospital in the year of his death, which shortly followed. He left two young children, Gaston and Mary.

Preceded by Guiscarda	Viscount of Béarn; 1134–1153	Succeeded by Gaston V
