= Gaston I of Béarn =

Gaston I (French: Gaston I^{er} de Béarn; died ca. 980) was an early French nobleman. He was the Viscount of Béarn.

== Family ==
Gaston's father was Centule II of Béarn, whilst his mother is completely unknown.

Gaston's paternal grandfather was noble Loup Centule.

At some point in his life, Gaston had married an unknown woman, and their son was Centule III of Béarn, a successor of his father and parent of Gaston II of Béarn.

== Sources ==
Preceded by Centule II of Béarn	Viscount of Béarn	Succeeded by Centule III of Béarn
