= Gaston IV of Béarn =

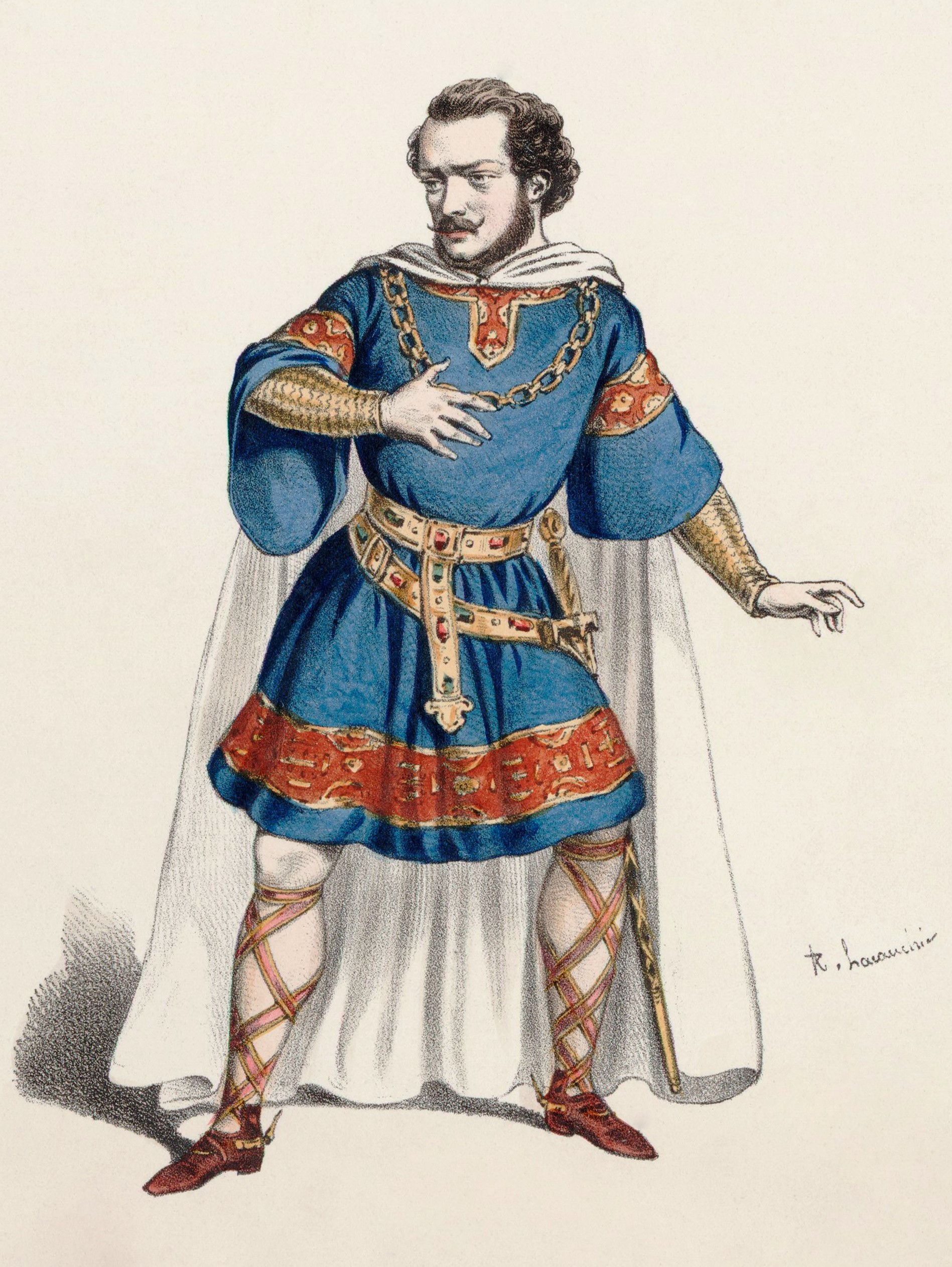

Viscount of Béarn
- Reign: 1090 – 1131
- Predecessor: Centule V
- Successor: Centule VI
- Born: c. 1060
- Died: 1131
- Spouse: Talesa of Aragon
- Issue: Centule VI of Béarn Guiscarda of Béarn
- House: House of Gascony
- Father: Centule V of Béarn
- Mother: Gisela of Gascony

Gaston IV (c. 1060 – died 1131) was viscount of Béarn from 1090 to 1131. He was called le Croisé––the Crusader––because of his participation in the First Crusade as part of the army of Raymond of Saint-Gilles.

== Biography ==
=== Early life and First Crusade ===
Gaston was the son of Centulle V of Béarn and Beatrix of Bigorre. He fought in the Reconquista in Spain. Gaston succeeded his father Centulle V of Béarn in 1090. During his rule, the borders of Béarn were established more definitively; he defeated the viscount of Dax, and took control of Orthez, Pays de Mixe, and Ostabaret by 1105 and gained Montaner through his marriage to Talesa. Though technically a vassal of the Duchy of Aquitaine, ruled at that time by William IX, Gaston effectively made Béarn an autonomous territory.

Gaston fought in the Reconquista in Spain, and he led a Béarnais contingent in the First Crusade, under Raymond IV of Toulouse, in 1096. He was one of the lesser nobility, but he carried his own standard and commanded his own men. At the siege of Antioch of 1097–1098, he led one of the divisions in the final battle against the powerful atabeg of Mosul, Kerbogha. During the power struggle following the capture of Antioch, Gaston deserted Raymond for Godfrey of Bouillon and marched with him to Jerusalem. Gaston and Tancred were sent ahead of the main army to occupy Bethlehem, and during the siege of Jerusalem of 1099, Gaston was in charge of Godfrey's siege engines. On July 15, 1099, Gaston was among the many crusaders that entered the city.

Gaston's experience in the Reconquista taught him that Muslims could live under Christian rule, as Mudéjar. He preferred negotiation and dialogue to senseless massacre, and he and Tancred tried to protect some of the Muslims of Jerusalem by sheltering them in the Al-Aqsa Mosque. However, they were soon killed by other crusaders, infuriating Gaston and Tancred. In August, Gaston led part of the center line of the crusader army at the battle of Ascalon of 1099. After the victory there, Gaston returned home with his men, as did most of the other crusaders.

=== Return and later life ===
Gaston was a pious man, and upon his return to Béarn he oversaw the construction of many churches destined to shelter pilgrims on the route to Santiago de Compostela. He also donated property to the abbey of St. Foy to establish new buildings in Morlàas and made a donation to the Abbey of Cluny. He also came into conflict with some churches, however; he successfully defended his claims to the territories of the abbey of St. Vincent de Lucq and the monastery of St. Mont.

Gaston participated together with fellow crusader Centule II of Bigorre in the conquest of Zaragoza by Alfonso I of Aragon in 1118. He was then assigned lordship of that city by the king and was killed in battle near Valencia in 1130 against the Almoravid governor of the city.

Gaston was succeeded by his young son Centulle VI, with Talèse acting as regent. Talèse wanted to unite Béarn and Aragon. The two were, at the time, roughly equal in power and influence, but Aragon instead united with Catalonia and Béarn began to decline. Gaston's descendants Gaston VI and Gaston VII participated in the Albigensian Crusade and the Seventh Crusade, respectively.

== Marriage and issue ==
Gaston married Talesa, daughter of Sancho Ramírez, Count of Ribagorza and lord of Aibar and Javierrelatre, illegitimate half-brother of King Sancho Ramírez and son of Ramiro I of Aragon. They had:

- Centulle VI
- Guiscarde, married Viscount Pierre of Gabarret

== Sources ==
- Asbridge, Thomas (2004). The First Crusade: A New History. Oxford University Press.
- Barton, Simon; Fletcher, Richard, eds. (2000). The World of El Cid: Chronicles of the Spanish Reconquest. Manchester University Press.
- Débax, Hélène, ed. (2008). Vicomtes et vicomtés dans l'Occident médiéval (in French). Presses Universitaires du Mirail.
- de Mandach, André (1993). Naissance et développement de la chanson de geste en Europe (in French). Vol. 6. Librairie Droz.
- O'Callaghan, Joseph F. (2013). Reconquest and Crusade in Medieval Spain. University of Pennsylvania Press.
- Riley-Smith, Jonathan Simon Christopher (2003). The First Crusade and Idea of Crusading. Bloomsbury Academic.
- Riley-Smith, Jonathan (2005). The Crusades: A History. A&C Black. p. 116. ISBN 9780826472694.
- Runciman, Steven, A History of the Crusades, Volume One: The First Crusade and the Foundation of the Kingdom of Jerusalem, Cambridge University Press, London, 1951,
- Pierre Tucoo-Chala, La Vicomté de Béarn et le Problème de sa Souveraineté, des Origines à 1260. Bordeaux, 1961.

Preceded by Centule V	Viscount of Béarn; 1090–1131	Succeeded by Centule VI
