= Gaston II =

Gaston II may refer to:

- Gaston II, Viscount of Béarn (circa 951 – 1012)
- Gaston II, Count of Foix (1308–1343)
