= Centule II of Béarn =

Centule II of Béarn (French: Centulle II de Béarn; died c. 940) was a Viscount of Béarn in West Francia.

He was most likely a son — and successor — of the Viscount Loup Centule, whilst his mother was most likely Loup Centule’s spouse of an unknown name.

Centule became a viscount, and he married an unknown woman, who bore him a son, Gaston.

Gaston became viscount after his father’s death, and he fathered a son, Centule III of Béarn.

== Sources ==
Preceded by Loup Centule	Viscount of Béarn	Succeeded by Gaston I of Béarn
