= Gaston III =

Gaston III may refer to:

- Gaston III of Béarn (died on or before 1045)
- Gaston III of Foix (1331–1391)
