= Gaston III of Béarn =

French nobleman

Gaston III (died on or before 1045) was the Viscount of Béarn in association with his father Centule IV. His mother was Angela of Oloron. Despite the fact that he predeceased his father, Pierre de Marca proposed the hypothesis that he was associated with his father in the seventeenth century. Because he appears in the chronicles with an ordinal, this hypothesis is generally accepted by historians today.

Around 1030, he married the important Gascon lady Adalais (sister of the future duke of Gascony and the viscount of Lomagne), with whom he had three children:

- Centule V, who succeeded Centule IV
- Oliva
- Reina
