= Centule VI of Béarn =

Centule VI (also Centulle) (died 17 July 1134 at the Battle of Fraga) was a Viscount of Béarn. He was born into the House of Gascony, and served as viscount from 1131 to his death. Like his father, he was an ideal Christian prince for his age, ready to serve the Church in the Reconquista.

He was the eldest son and successor of Gaston IV and Talesa. He was a minor when he succeeded his father and his mother assumed the regency. His tutor was Guy de Lons, Bishop of Lescar, who also commanded the army during the period of Centule's minority.

In 1134, Centule led the Bearnese to join the crusade of Alfonso the Battler against the Almoravid fortress of Fraga at the Battle of Fraga. He himself led the troops in battle, but died when the united Christian army was routed by the Almoravids.

As Centule had no children, Béarn passed to his elder sister Guiscarda and her son Peter II.

Preceded by Gaston IV	Viscount of Béarn; 1131–1134	Succeeded by Guiscarda
