= Centule IV of Béarn =

French noble (died 1058)

Centule IV Gaston (died 1058), called the Old, was the seventh Viscount of Béarn from 1012 to his death.

He succeeded his father Gaston II while yet a minor, under a regency until 1022. His mother was his father's wife of an unknown name.

== Reign ==
Centule placed great importance on maintaining good relations with the Catholic Church. In the year in which he assumed the powers of government, he founded the Abbey of Saint-Pé-de-Geyres near the border with Bigorre. He was subsequently installed as the defensor of that monastery and of the lands of Saint Peter in Gascony and Béarn by his suzerain Sancho VI William of Gascony. In 1033, Centule confirmed the possession of the county of Bordeaux by Duke Odo.

He strove to expand his power into neighboring territories and married Angela of Oloron, daughter and heiress of the neighboring Viscount Aner II Lupo of Oloron, thus uniting those two entities. He gained the valleys of Aspe, Ossau, and Barétous all the way from the river Oloron to Navarrenx.
His eldest son Gaston III was associated with the vicecomital throne, but died in or before 1045. He warred against the viscounts of Dax and Soule, killing the viscount Arnold II of Dax in 1050. He himself died in a Souletin ambush eight years later. His grandson Centule V succeeded him.

== Children ==
he had seven children:

- Gaston III (died before 1045), father of Centule V
- Raymond Centule, knight, buried in the monastery of Saint-Pé de Geyres
- Auriol Centule, lord of Clarac, Igon, Baudreix, Boeil and Auga. Had issue.
- Igon
- Baudreix
- Boeil
- Auga

== Sources ==
Preceded by Gaston II	Viscount of Béarn; 1012–1058	Succeeded by Centule V, Viscount of Béarn
