= Viscounty of Dax =

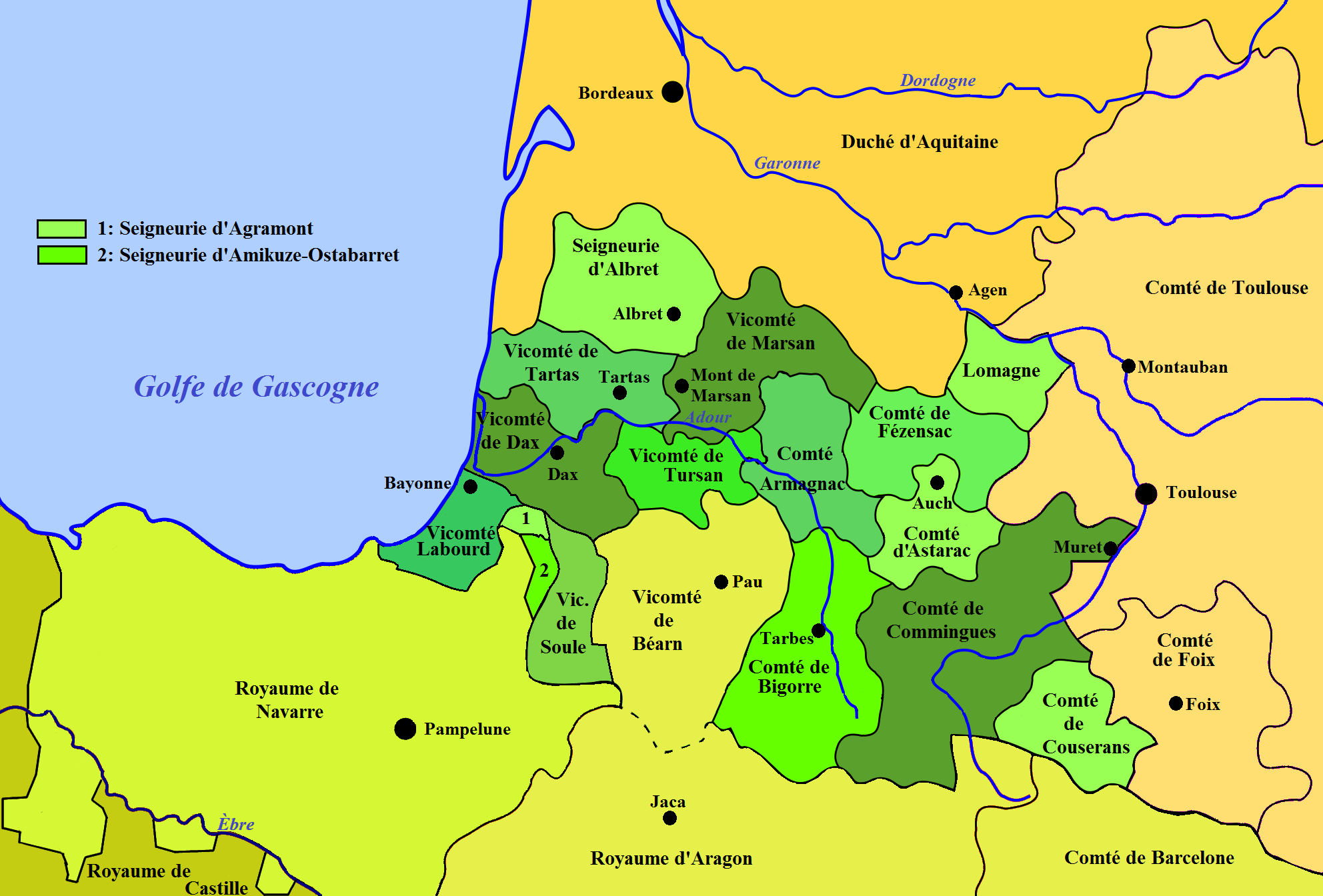
Map of Gascony showing the Viscounty of Dax

The Viscounty of Dax was a viscountcy in southwestern Gascony, located within the modern-day Landes department of France. Centred on Dax, the viscountcy existed from the 11th century

The viscounts were descended from Duke Sancho IV of Gascony. While the dukes had acquired the powers of a count in the Aguais, the territory around Dax, by the tenth century, it was the viscounts who exercised these powers in practice in the eleventh.

The first recorded viscount was Arnaud Loup, who was dead by 1020. He was a son of Loup Aner, viscount of Oloron, a grandson of Sancho IV. At the death of Arnaud II around 1034, the viscounty was disputed between his sons, Raymond Arnaud and Garcie Arnaud, who became viscount of Orthe. In 1089, Raymond Arnaud's son Navar was killed during a conflict with Viscount Centule V of Béarn, who seized the viscounty, but eventually restored it to Navar's nephew, Pierre Arnaud, who was succeeded by his sister, Guiraude, who married her third cousin, Arnaud Dat. Aranud Dat's grandson, Pierre II, was killed in 1177 in a war against Duke Richard the Lionheart, who seized the viscounty. It was not restored.

== List of viscounts ==
- Arnaud I Loup (died before 1020)
- Arnaud II (died around 1034), son of Arnaud I
- Raymond I Arnaud (died around 1088), son of Arnaud II
- Navar (died 1089), son of Raymond I
- Pierre I Arnaud (fl. 1107–1120), son of Arnaud III Raymond, brother of Navar
- Guiraude, daughter of Arnaud III Raymond
- Arnaud Dat, married Guiraude
- Raymond II Arnaud (died 1167), son of Guiraude and Arnaud Dat
- Pierre II (died 1177), son of Raymond II

Arnaud Dat was descended in the male line from Arnaud Loup through his son Garcie Arnaud, who became viscount of Mixe and Ostabarret. Pierre II had a daughter, Navarra, who married Raymond Arnaud, viscount of Tartas. Raymond II had a younger son, Navar, who became bishop of Couserans.

== Bibliography ==
- Abbott, Paul D. (1981). Provinces, Pays and Seigneuries of France. Pirie Printers. ISBN 0959377301.
- Boutoulle, Frédéric (2005). "Le conflit béarno-dacquois et les croisades de 1149". Bulletin de la Société de Borda (479): 341–356.
- Boutoulle, Frédéric (2011). "Homicides et violences dans les conflits familiaux de la Gascogne occidentale (XI^{e}–XII^{e} siècle)". In Martin Aurell (ed.). La famille déchirée: Luttes intestines dans la parenté médiévale. pp. 203–212.
- Couderc-Barraud, Hélène (2008). La violence, l'ordre et la paix: résoudre les conflits en Gascogne du XI^{e} au début du XIII^{e} siècle. Presses universitaires du Mirail.
- Goovaerts, Léon (1899). Écrivains, artistes et savants de l'ordre de Prémontré. Société belge de librairie.
