= Viscounty of Béarn =

Medieval French lordship (9th century–1620)

Coordinates: 43.30°N 0.37°W

Viscounty of Béarn Vicomitatus Benearniens (Latin) Vescomtat de Bearn (Occitan) Vicomté de Béarn (French)
- 9th century–1620
- Flag Coat of arms

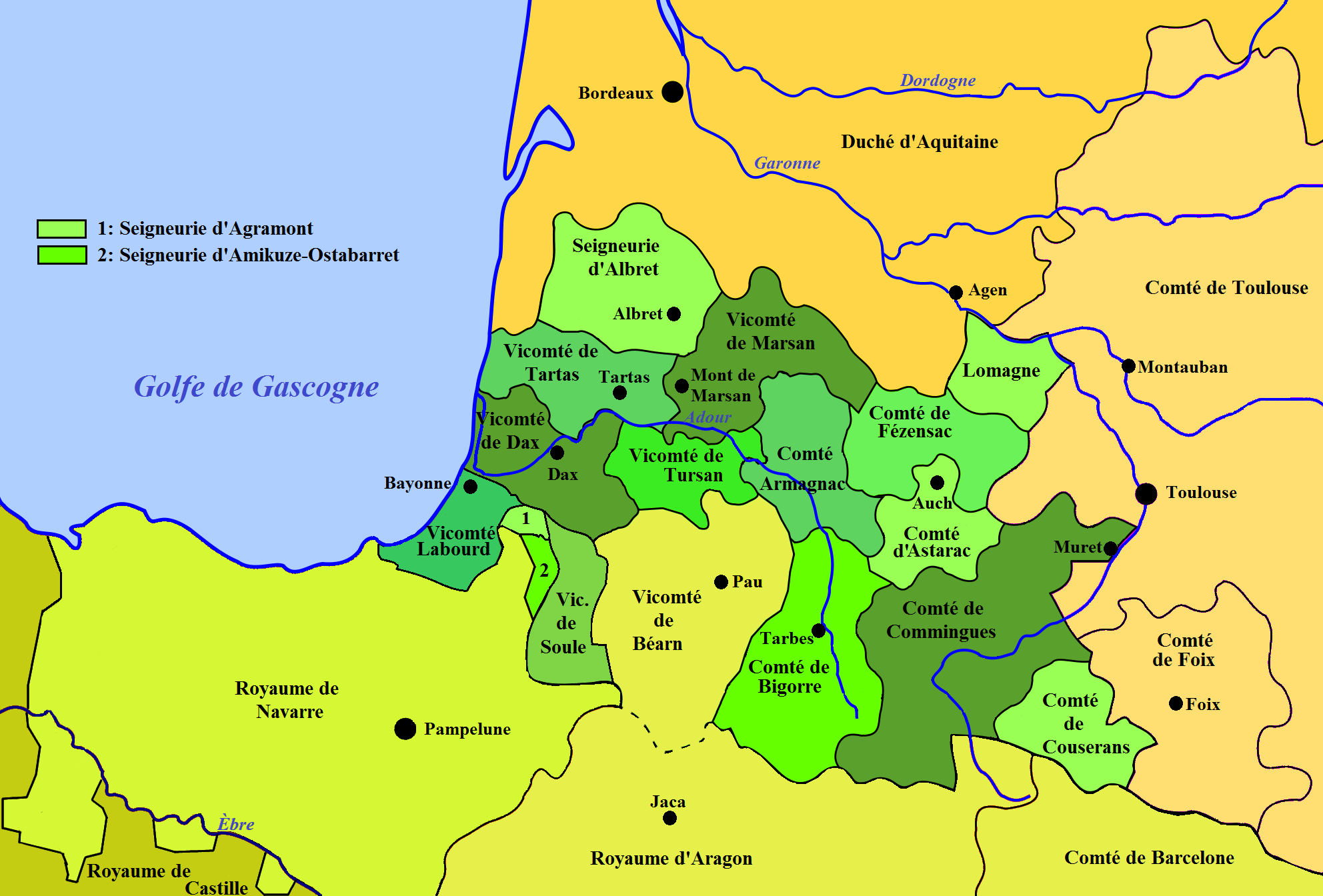
- Gascony and Bearn c. 1150
- Capital: Lescar (up to c. 841); Morlans (10th–12th centuries); Ortès (12th–15th centuries); Pau
- Common languages: Medieval Latin; Old Occitan then Béarnese; Basque
- Religion: Roman Catholicism (up to the 16th century); Calvinism (up to 1620)
- Government: Monarchy
- Viscount or Prince
  - 9th century: Centule I
  - 1610–20: Louis I
- Historical era: Middle Ages and Renaissance
  - Established: 9th century
  - Independence declared by Gaston III Fèbus: 25 September 1347
  - Henry II became King of France: 27 February 1594
  - Incorporated into France: October 1620
Succeeded by
Kingdom of France

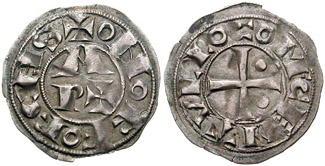
An early Bearnese coin

The Viscounty, later Principality of Béarn (Gascon: Bearn or Biarn), was a medieval lordship in the far south of France, part of the Duchy of Gascony from the late ninth century. In 1347, the viscount declared Béarn an independent principality without feudal obligations. It later entered a personal union with the Kingdom of Navarre in 1479 and with France in 1589. In 1620, the prince (who was also the king of France) formally incorporated Béarn as a province of France.

== First dynasty ==
The citation of a certain "Gaston [son] of Centule, viscount of Béarn" (Gasto Centuli vicecomes Bearnensis) is the first attestation of a specific regional organization in the late 860s/early 870s. The viscounty was named after Lescar, former Benearnum, last cited in 673. Its first parliamentary body, the Cour Major, was formed in 1080.

A mint was established at Morlaàs under Viscount Centule V, who was also Count of Bigorre (1080–90) jure uxoris. Centule sold the magisterium sectionis cognorum (right to mint coins) to a private moneyer. The mint continued operating under his successors, always minting coins bearing Centule's name. It was at the time the most productive mint in Gascony.

== Under Aquitaine ==
Gascony was united to the Duchy of Aquitaine in 1053. Béarn, as a part of Gascony, became subject to the dukes of Aquitaine and, in 1152, passed to the kings of England, heirs of Duchess Eleanor of Aquitaine.

While nominally part of the Duchy of Aquitaine, the Viscounts of Béarn frequently joined Aragonese military campaigns between the 10th and 12th centuries. In 1170, the viscounty passed to the Catalan House of Montcada who paid homage to the kings of Aragon. Under Aragonese influence, the legal charters in Béarn were further developed into the Fors de Bearn.

Gaston VII, Viscount of Béarn, did homage to King Henry III of England as Duke of Aquitaine at Bordeaux in 1242. In 1290, Béarn passed to the House of Foix with the inheritance of Margaret, Viscountess of Béarn of the lands from her father Gaston VII.

== Sovereign principality ==
The independence of Béarn from France and Aquitaine came about as a result of the Hundred Years' War (1337–1453) between France and England. In 1347, on the heels of English victory at the battle of Crécy (1346), the Viscount Gaston III Fébus paid homage to the king of France for his county of Foix, but stated that Béarn was to be held "from God and from no man in this world". After the English victory at Poitiers in 1356, Gaston refused to attend the Estates General of France as Count of Foix.

For the next decade, he successfully resisted the efforts of the Black Prince to enforce his suzerainty as Prince of Aquitaine over Béarn. In 1364, Gaston dropped the lowly vicecomital title in favour of "Lord of Béarn" (Dominus Bearni). Its chief seat and stronghold lay at Pau, a site fortified by the 11th century, and proclaimed as official capital of the independent principality in 1464.

The official language of the sovereign principality was the local vernacular Bearnès dialect of Old Occitan. It was the spoken language of law courts and of business and it was the written language of customary law. Although vernacular languages were increasingly preferred to Latin in western Europe in the late Middle Ages, the status of Occitan in Béarn was unusual because its use was required by law: "lawyers will draft their petitions and pleas in the vernacular language of the present country, both in speech and in writing".

== Sovereign under the Foix-Albret ==
In 1479, the Lord of Béarn, Francis Phoebus, inherited the Kingdom of Navarre, across the Pyrenees to the southwest. The two sovereign entities would from then on remain in personal union. In 1512, the Kingdom of Navarre was almost entirely occupied by Spain; only Lower Navarre, north of the Pyrenees, escaped Spanish permanent occupation. In 1517, Henry I (II of Navarre) inherited it, as well as Béarn, from his mother. The Bearnese monarchs extended the use of Occitan to Navarre after 1512, despite the fact that it was not the vernacular language there, where Basque was the tongue of the people. The Estates of Navarre convoked in 1522 (or in 1523, according to other sources) kept records in Occitan, as did the Chancery of Navarre created in 1524. When Henry II revised the Fueros of Navarre in 1530, he had them translated from Castilian into Occitan.

In 1564, Henry's daughter, Jeanne III, firmly opposing Rome, declared Catholicism outlawed and disbanded monasteries, confiscating church property. When Jeanne's son, Henry II (III of Navarre), became King Henry IV of France in 1589, he kept all his estates distinct from the French royal domain. He re-appointed his sister, Catherine, his regent in Navarre and Béarn. It was only in 1607, after Catherine's death (1604), that he acceded to the demands of the Parlement of Paris, and reunited with the French crown his domains of Foix, Bigorre and Comminges, including Quatre-Vallées and Nébouzan, conforming to the tradition that the king of France would have no personal domain.

However, he refused the Parlement's demand that he unite Béarn and Lower Navarre with the French crown, since these territories were not French estates, but separate realms. Had these principalities been united with France, the Edict of Nantes (1598) would have applied to them and Catholic property would have had to have been restored. Nonetheless, Henry, now a Catholic, consented to restore Catholic rights of worship in certain towns. The estates of Béarn continued to conduct business in Occitan and laws were enacted in the same. Prior to the 1601, the Duc de Rohan was the heir to Navarre and Béarn, since the Salic law of France did not apply there.

After Henry IV's death, Calvinists from Béarn attended the Huguenot conference at Saumur in 1611 in an effort to enlist their support for Béarnese and Navarrese independence. In 1614, the same year he came of age, Henry IV's successor, Louis XIII, was confronted by a Huguenot uprising supported by Béarn. In a meeting of the French Estates General that year, the Third Estate petitioned for the union of all sovereign provinces with France. In 1616, Louis issued an edict uniting the principality with France, but it was ignored.

== Incorporation into France ==
On 3 May 1616, the Treaty of Loudun gave the Huguenots, who had supported the rebellion of the Prince of Condé, the right join their churches with those in Béarn. Louis's edict of June 1617 ordering the restoration of property confiscated from Catholics was also ignored. In 1620, Louis marched into Béarn with a large army, convoked the estates and, sitting on his Béarnese throne, issued an edict of union with France, thus removing the principality's sovereignty.

Louis preserved the freedom of worship of the Calvinists, the right of the estates to negotiate their taxes and the obligation of the king of France to swear to uphold the customary law of Béarn on his accession. He also united Béarn and Navarre: thenceforth the Parlement of Navarre and Béarn had authority over both regions and would sit at Pau. Its operating language would be French. This was the first time the French language was imposed on a region incorporated into France. It was not part of an effort to convert the French king's Occitan subjects into French speakers, nor did it directly impact the Bearnese aristocracy, who had adopted French as a status language during the 16th century. It was politically symbolic, since the use of Occitan in an official capacity had been an important marker of Bearnese independence and a source of pride.

== See also ==
- Viscounts of Béarn
- Fors de Béarn
