= Guiscarda of Béarn =

Guiscarda (or Guiscarde) (died 1154) was the ruling Viscountess of Béarn in 1134, and acted as regent during the minority of her son in 1134–1147, as well as for her grandson in 1153–1154.

She was the eldest child of Gaston IV of Béarn and Talesa of Aragon.

She later succeeded her younger brother Centule VI as viscountess in 1134, but left the post to her son. As her son was a minor, however, she nevertheless acted as regent until 1147.

Guiscarda first married Peter II of Gabarret, who died before she succeeded to Béarn. Her son by him, Peter II, also succeeded in 1134. Guiscarda's mother acted as primary regent, Guiscarda only secondarily. In 1147, Peter attained his majority and Guiscarda retired from her functions in government.

When Peter died in 1153, Guiscarda assumed the regency for his son Gaston V, until her own death the next year.

| Preceded by Centule VI | Viscountess of Béarn; 1134–1147 | Succeeded by Peter II |
