= Guiraude de Dax =

Guiraude de Dax (fl. c. 1100 – c. 1130) was a Gascon heiress. She was the daughter of Arnaud III Raymond, vicomte de Dax, who died c. 1090.

== Overview ==
Guiraude was married to a distant cousin, Arnaud Dat, lord of Mixe and Ostabarret, and with the death of her brother, vicomte Pierre Arnaud, without issue (c. 1120), she and her husband succeeded to vicomte. Their marriage had reunited the two branches of descent from Arnaud Loup, the first vicomte of Dax, who died prior to 1020.

Vicomtesse Guiraude was the mother of Raymond II Arnaud, vicomte de Dax (c. 1100–1167), and through her great-granddaughter, Navarre de Dax, the wife of Raimond Arnaud, vicomte de Tartas, Guiraude was the ancestor of that family, as well the seigneurs d'Albret.
