= Gabarret =

- Commune
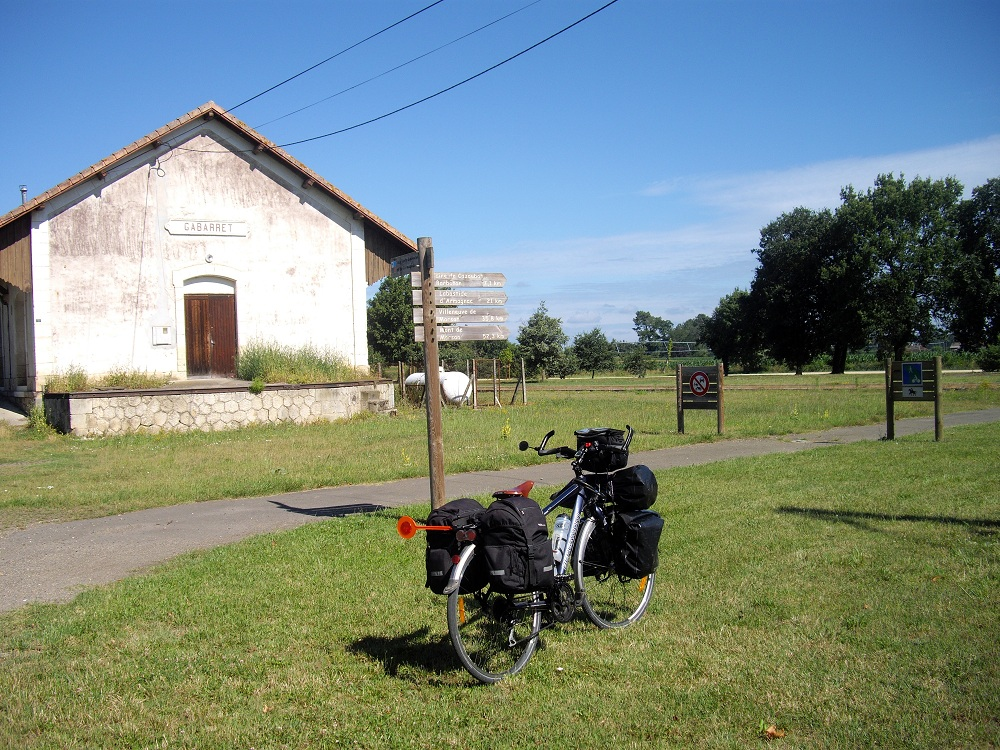
- Former railway station

- Coat of arms
- Location of Gabarret
- Location within France Location within Nouvelle-Aquitaine
- Coordinates: 43°59′15″N 0°00′41″E
- Country: France
- Region: Nouvelle-Aquitaine
- Department: Landes
- Arrondissement: Mont-de-Marsan
- Canton: Haute Lande Armagnac
- Intercommunality: Landes d'Armagnac

Government
  - Mayor (2020–2026): Stéphane Barlaud
- Area^{1}: 16.9 km^{2} (6.5 sq mi)
- Elevation: 153 m (502 ft)
- Highest elevation: 178 m (584 ft)
- Lowest elevation: 135 m (443 ft)
- Population (2023): 1,283
  - Density: 75.9/km^{2} (197/sq mi)
- Time zone: UTC+01:00 (CET)
  - Summer (DST): UTC+02:00 (CEST)
- INSEE/Postal code: 40102 /40310
- ^{1} French Land Register data, which excludes lakes, ponds, glaciers > 1 km^{2} (0.386 sq mi or 247 acres) and river estuaries.

Gabarret (French pronunciation: [ɡabaʁɛ]; Occitan: Gavarret) is a commune in the Landes department in Nouvelle-Aquitaine in southwestern France.

== Population ==
Historical population
Year	Pop.	±% p.a.
1968	1,463	—
1975	1,403	−0.60%
1982	1,381	−0.23%
1990	1,335	−0.42%
1999	1,296	−0.33%
2007	1,217	−0.78%
2012	1,323	+1.68%
2017	1,295	−0.43%
2023	1,283	−0.16%
Source: INSEE

== See also ==
- Communes of the Landes department
