= Aguais =

Region of France

The Aguais is a region in the Landes department of Nouvelle-Aquitaine in southwestern France.

The etymology of Aguais, is from the Latin Aquæ (water).
