= Gaston V of Béarn =

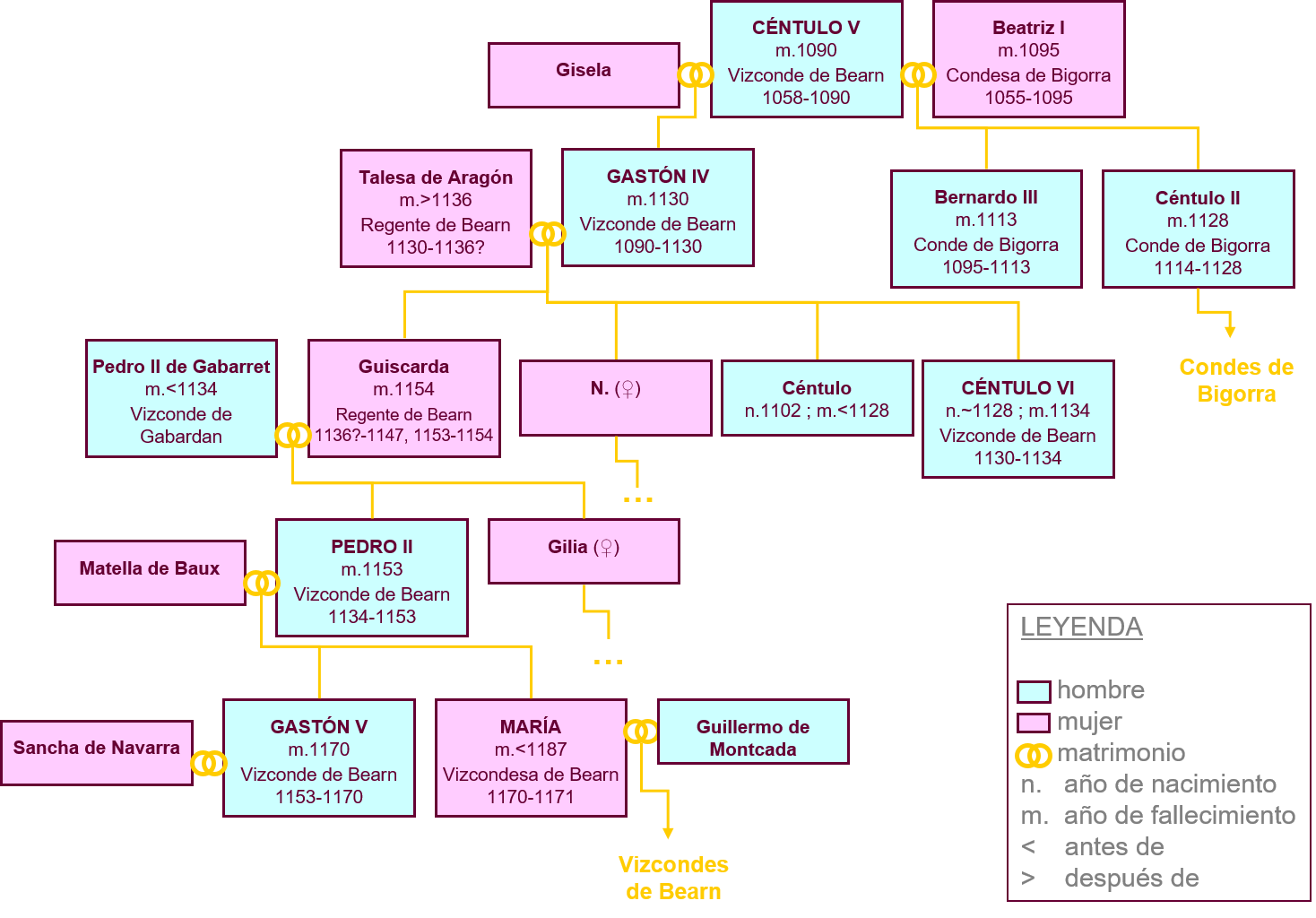
Family tree of the viscounts of Béarn between the 11th and 12th centuries

Gaston V (died 1170, before 30 April) was the Viscount of Béarn, Gabardan, and Brulhois from 1153 to his death.

He was the son of Peter II and a Matelle de Baux. When his father died in 1153, he inherited his title under the regency of his grandmother Guiscarda. When Guiscarda died in 1154, the Bearnese assembly put him under the tutelage of Raymond Berengar IV of Barcelona and did homage to the Catalan at Canfranc. Up until this point, Béarn had been de facto independent. It had long ceased to recognize the suzerainty of the Duchy of Aquitaine and had interacted with the King of Aragon as an equal. With this act, however, it passed into the vassalage of the Aragonese Empire.

After attaining his majority, Gaston married Sancha, daughter of García Ramírez of Navarre, in 1165. However, the couple had no children and he eventually retired to a monastery of the Hospitallers and there he died, leaving Béarn to his sister who became Mary, Viscount of Béarn.

Preceded by Peter II	Viscount of Béarn; 1153–1170	Succeeded by Mary
