= Araux =

- Commune
- Location of Araux
- Location within France Location within Nouvelle-Aquitaine
- Coordinates: 43°21′11″N 0°48′23″W
- Country: France
- Region: Nouvelle-Aquitaine
- Department: Pyrénées-Atlantiques
- Arrondissement: Oloron-Sainte-Marie
- Canton: Le Cœur de Béarn
- Intercommunality: Béarn des Gaves

Government
  - Mayor (2020–2026): Jean-Jacques Montreer
- Area^{1}: 5.40 km^{2} (2.08 sq mi)
- Elevation: 120 m (390 ft)
- Highest elevation: 188 m (617 ft)
- Lowest elevation: 98 m (322 ft)
- Population (2023): 136
  - Density: 25.2/km^{2} (65.2/sq mi)
- Time zone: UTC+01:00 (CET)
  - Summer (DST): UTC+02:00 (CEST)
- INSEE/Postal code: 64033 /64190
- ^{1} French Land Register data, which excludes lakes, ponds, glaciers > 1 km^{2} (0.386 sq mi or 247 acres) and river estuaries.

Araux (Araus in Occitan) is a commune in the Pyrénées-Atlantiques department in southwestern France.

== Geography ==
=== Location ===
This commune is located roughly midway between Sauveterre-de-Béarn to the northwest and Navarrenx to the south-east.

=== Access ===
Araux is accessed by departmental roads 836 and 936.

=== Waterways ===
Araux lies in the Adour watershed. The Gave d'Oloron (a tributary of the Gave de Pau) and the Lausset, a tributary, flow through the commune. The Cassou dou Boue and the Lescuncette stream, both tributaries of the Harcellane stream (itself a tributary of the Lausset), also pass through the commune.

== Toponymy ==
Araux has also been referred to as Araus (

== See also ==
- Communes of the Pyrénées-Atlantiques department
