= Centule V of Béarn =

French aristocrat

Centule V (or Centulle; died 1090), called the Young, was the Viscount of Béarn from 1058 to his death. Centule increased the autonomy of the vizconde of Béarn and distanced them from the dukes of Aquitaine, to whom they owed theoretical vassalage. Centule was also Count of Bigorre jure uxoris as Centule I .

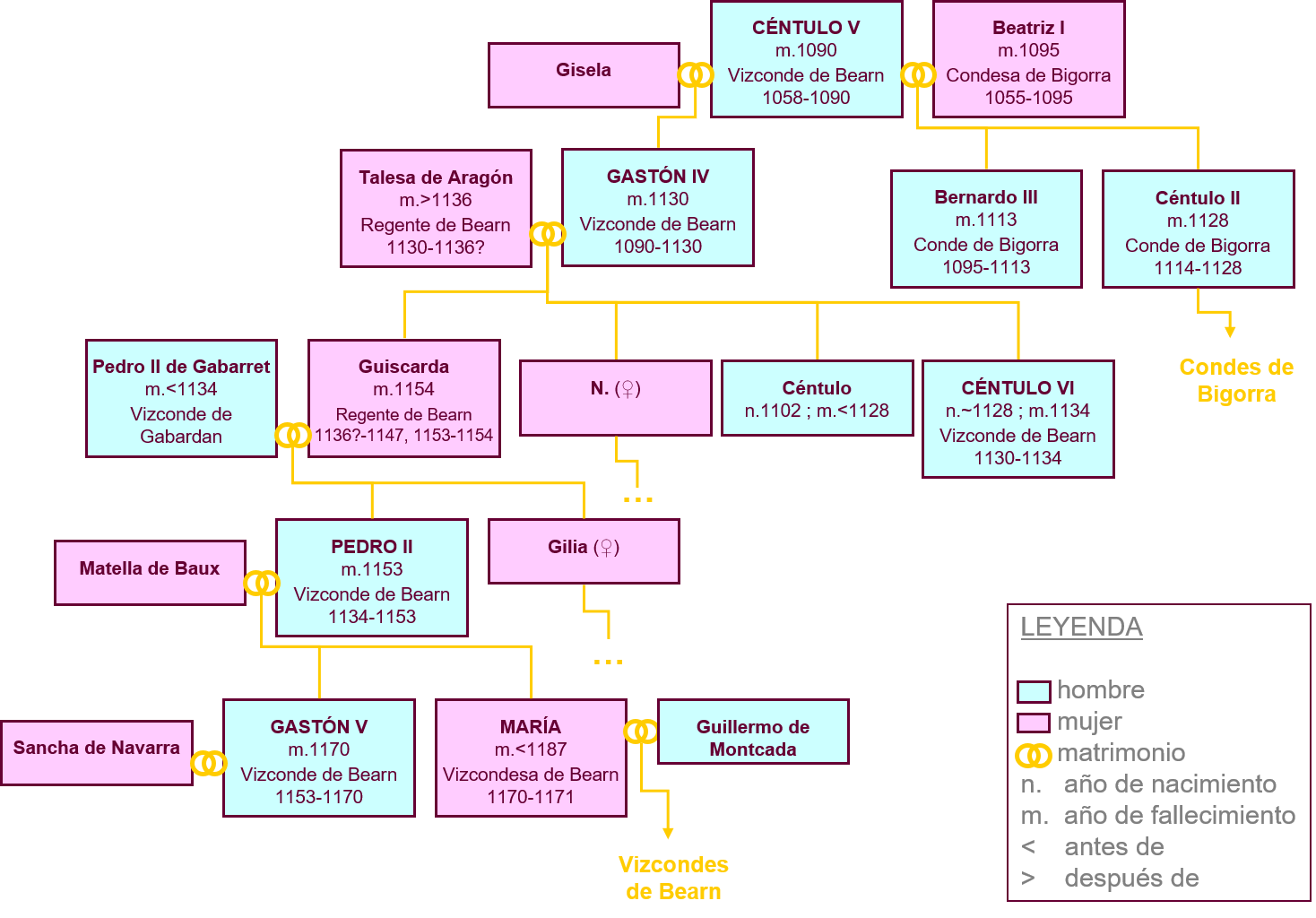
Family tree of Centule's descendants.

Centule was the eldest son of Gaston III and lady Adalais (sister of the duke of Gascony and the viscount of Lomagne), and was successor of his paternal grandfather Centule IV. Centule was almost a sovereign prince. He minted his own money in his capital of Morlaas. He received the viscounty of Acqs and the countries of Orthe and Salies from the duke of Aquitaine, who freed him from nominal ties of vassalage. He was the only person with the right to call on the knights of Béarn, who owed fealty to none but him. He granted the deserted city of Oloron a charter repopulating it. Centuries later, this fuero, called the For de Oloron, would be incorporated into the other Fors de Bearn.

Centule was a participant in the Gregorian reform and maintained relations with the Holy See. He made many donations to the church and initiated the construction of the church of Santa Fe de Morlaas, the first romanesque edifice in Béarn. Pope Gregory VII referred to him as an amator justitiae, lover of justice; defensor pauperum, defender of the poor; and propagator pacis, propagator of the peace. Towards 1060, Centule married a relative of his, probably a cousin, possibly a daughter of Bernard II of Gascony, named Gisela (Gisla), with whom he had two children, his heir Gaston IV and a daughter named Osquinette. The pope, however, exhorted him to break the marriage on grounds of consanguinity, which he obediently did (1074), founding, in penitence, a priory at Morlaas dependent on the Abbey of Cluny.

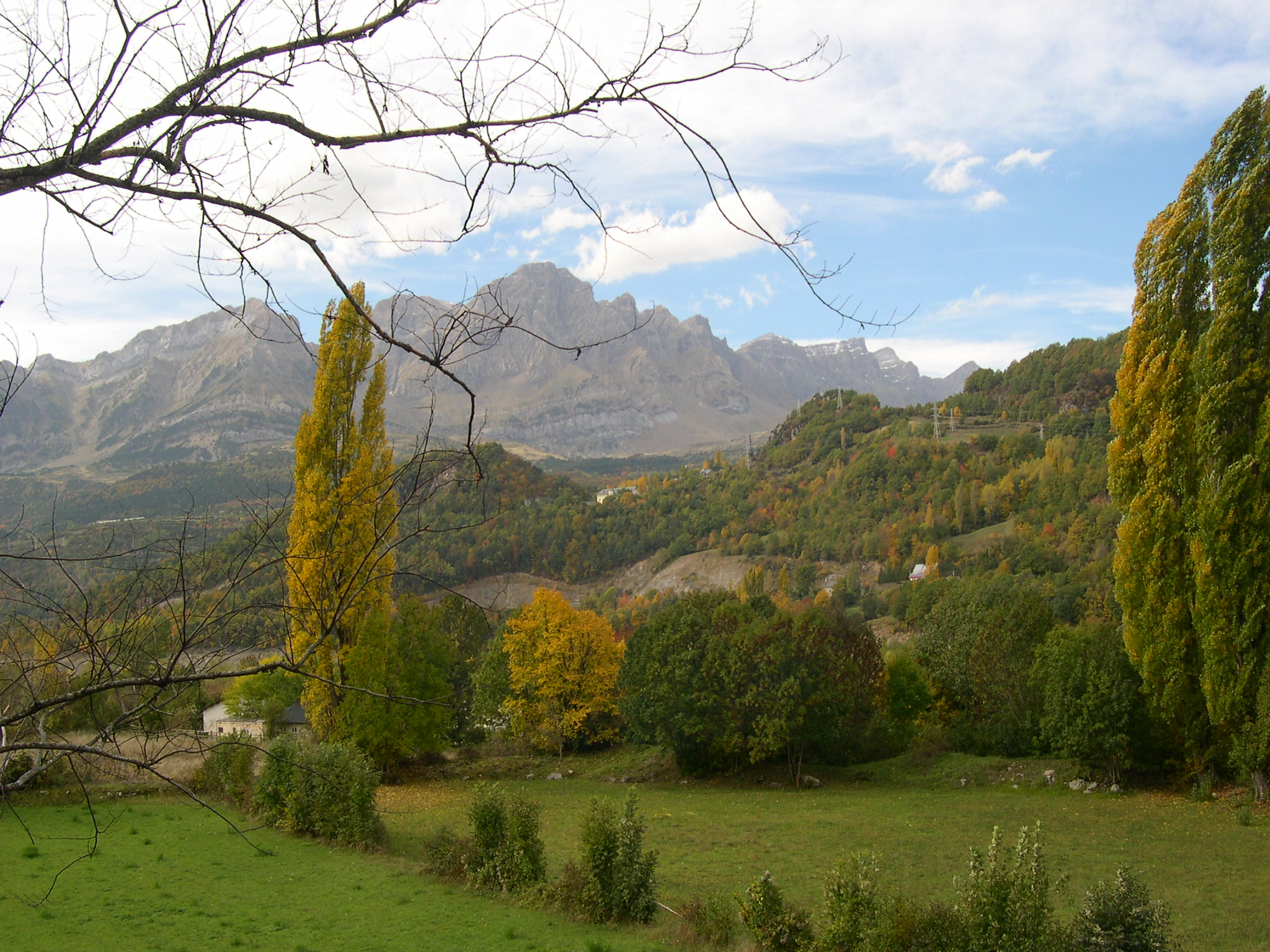
The valley of Tena in which Centule was assassinated.

Centule married for a second time in 1077 to Beatrice I of Bigorre. With her he had other children: Bernard and Centule, both future counts of Bigorre. Centule married his eldest son to Talesa, a natural daughter of Sancho V of Navarre, and Gaston received the neighbouring viscounty of Montaner as a dowry, thus uniting it to the dominion of Béarn. It can be seen that, through strategic marriages, Centule expanded his control to include his western neighbours Bigorre and Montaner and solidified an alliance with his royal neighbour to the south, the Crown of Aragon. However, he had to war with his neighbours to the east. In 1082, he launched an attack on Dax, but was severely defeated.

In 1079, Centule participated in the attempt to take Zaragoza that was repelled by El Cid Campeador, then in the service of the Moors. In 1090, he travelled anew into Aragon at the head of Bearnese troops to assist in an assault on Huesca under the guidance of Sancho, but he was assassinated in the Tena Valley. Gaston succeeded him and continued in his policies of aggrandisement and friendly church-state relations.

== Sources ==
- Débax, Hélène, ed. (2008). Vicomtes et vicomtés dans l'Occident médiéval (in French). Presses Universitaires du Mirail.
- Porteous, John (1989). "Crusader Coinage with Greek or Latin Inscriptions". In Hazard, Harry W.; Zacour, Norman P. (eds.). A History of the Crusades. Vol. VI: The Impact of the Crusades on Europe. The University of Wisconsin Press.

Preceded by Centule IV	Viscount of Béarn; 1058–1090	Succeeded by Gaston IV
