= Battle of Fraga =

1134 battle in Spain

Coordinates: 41.5167°N 0.3333°E

- Part of the Reconquista
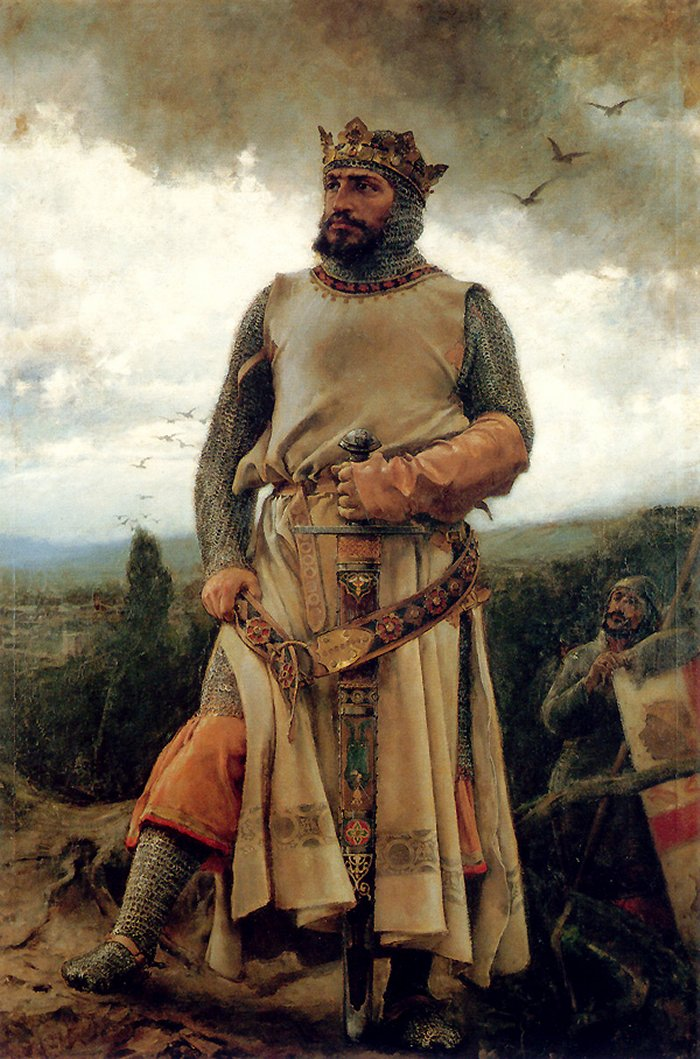
- Alfonso the Battler
Date	17 July 1134
Location	Fraga, Spain
Result	Almoravid victory

Belligerents
Kingdom of Aragon	Almoravids

Commanders and leaders
Alfonso the Battler †; Centule VI †	Yahya ibn Ghaniya

Strength
12,000 (Note: Powers states both sides numbered several thousand men)	2,700

The Battle of Fraga was a battle of the Spanish Reconquista that took place on 17 July 1134 at Fraga, Aragon, Spain. The battle was fought between the combined forces of King Alfonso the Battler and Viscount Centule VI of Béarn, and a variety of Almoravid forces that had come to the aid of the town of Fraga which was being besieged by Alfonso. The battle resulted in an Almoravid victory. The Aragonese monarch Alfonso died shortly after the battle.

== Background ==
Since the second half of the 11th century, the kings of Aragón and the counts of Barcelona and Urgel tried with obstinacy to conquer the Muslim held towns and frontier fortresses of the Marca Superior. Specifically, they targeted the low lands around the Segre and Cinca Rivers all the way to the mouth of the Ebro, an active and prosperous region with direct access to the Mediterranean Sea. The most important towns in this region were Lleida, Mequinenza, Fraga, and Tortosa.

== The battle ==
In July 1134, Alfonso, known by the Muslims as Ibn Rudmir (literally "son of Ramiro) or al-Farandji, laid siege to the town of Fraga with an army from Aragon. The Almoravid response was swift and decisive. The Emir of Cordoba, son of the caliph, equipped a force of 2,000 cavalry-men; the Emir of Murcia and Valencia put together 500 cavalry-men; and the governor of Lleida another 200. Once these forces combined, they marched to the relief of Fraga.

The day of 17 July 1134 brought the arrival of an Almoravid relief force, led by the governor of Lérida, Ibn ‘Iyad. Seeing reinforcements, the besieged Fragans sallied out, however Alfonso, still confident in his numerical and tactical advantage, rallied his troops. His entourage clashed with the cavalry of the emir of Murcia, Yahya ibn Ghaniya. The Almoravid cavalry decimated the Aragonese soldiers. Upon seeing this, the townspeople fell upon the Aragonese camp pillaging and killing a majority of the soldiers there. They made off with all of the Aragonese army's provisions and took them back into the city of Fraga. At that moment, the emir of Cordoba launched a final attack with his cavalry and broke the Christian troops once again. Having lost a majority of his soldiers, Alfonso was obliged to flee and made for Zaragoza. He died on 7 September 1134.

== Aftermath ==
The Aragonese toll at Fraga was significant. Amongst the dead or captured were many notable members of Aragonese society. Guy of Lescar who fought with the Christian forces, was captured by the Almoravids, and imprisoned at Balensiyya.

Aside from the king, the following notable French knights were killed at Fraga:

- Aimery II of Narbonne
- Centule VI, the viscount of Béarn
- Bertrán de Risnel

== Citations ==
- Cheyette, Fredric L. (2001). Ermengard of Narbonne and the World of the Troubadours. Cornell University Press. ISBN 978-0-8014-3952-0.
- Corbera, Carlos L. (2000). Les nobles francos en Aragon au service d'Alphonse le Batailleur. Annales du Midi.
- Paul, Nicholas L. (6 September 2012). To Follow in Their Footsteps: The Crusades and Family Memory in the High Middle Ages. Cornell University Press. ISBN 978-0801465543.
- Powers, James F. (2010). "Fraga, Siege and Battle of". In Rogers, Clifford J. (ed.). The Oxford Encyclopedia of Medieval Warfare and Military Technology. Vol. 2. Oxford University Press. pp. 62–63.
- Reilly, Bernard F. (1995). The Contest of Christian and Muslim Spain, 1031-1157. Blackwell Publishing.
