= Castétis =

- Commune
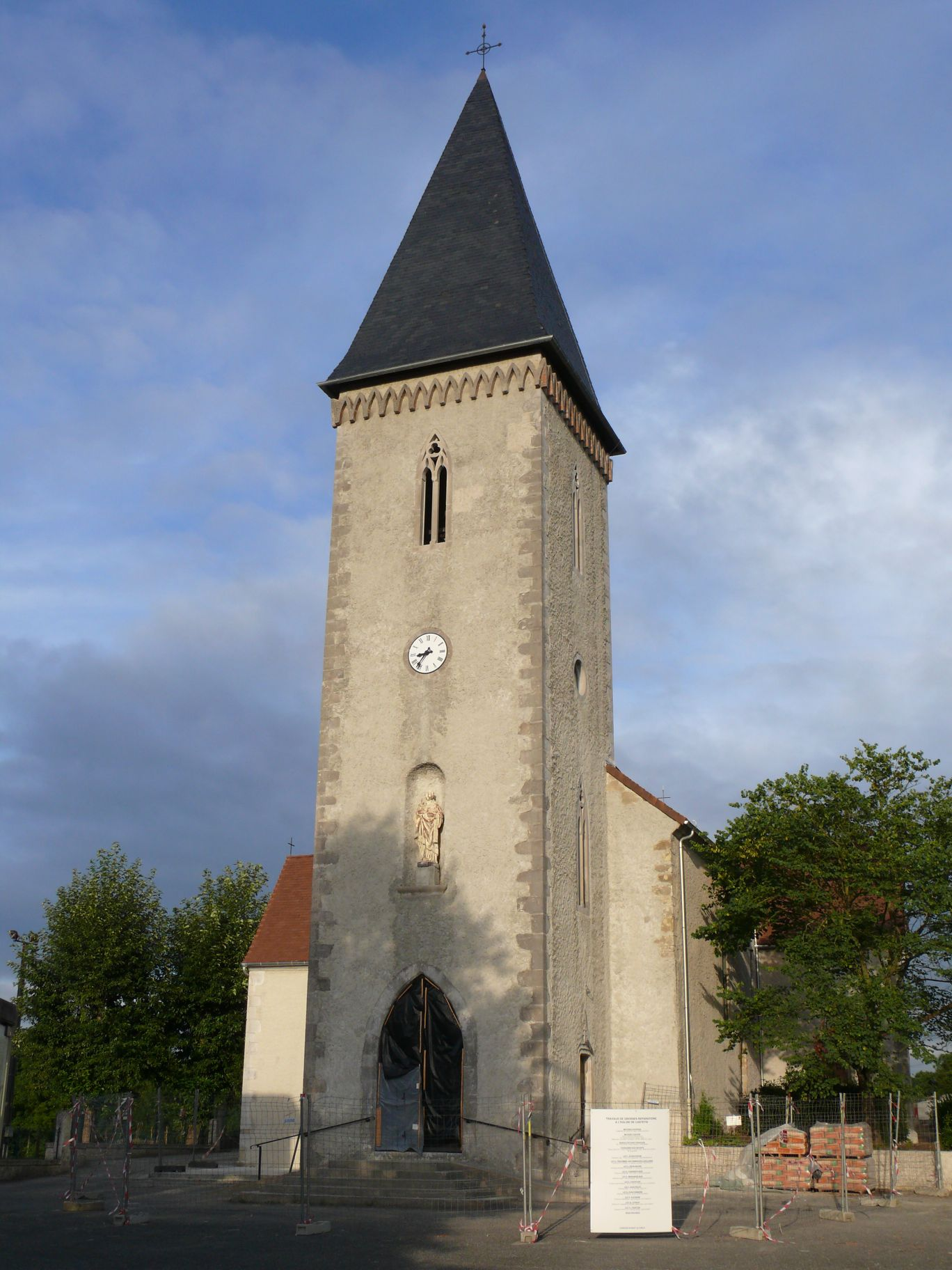
- Church
- Location of Castétis
- Location within France Location within Nouvelle-Aquitaine
- Coordinates: 43°28′11″N 0°42′46″W
- Country: France
- Region: Nouvelle-Aquitaine
- Department: Pyrénées-Atlantiques
- Arrondissement: Pau
- Canton: Artix et Pays de Soubestre
- Intercommunality: Lacq-Orthez

Government
  - Mayor (2020–2026): Henri Poustis
- Area^{1}: 9.06 km^{2} (3.50 sq mi)
- Elevation: 93 m (305 ft)
- Highest elevation: 182 m (597 ft)
- Lowest elevation: 56 m (184 ft)
- Population (2023): 645
  - Density: 71.2/km^{2} (184/sq mi)
- Time zone: UTC+01:00 (CET)
  - Summer (DST): UTC+02:00 (CEST)
- INSEE/Postal code: 64177 /64300
- ^{1} French Land Register data, which excludes lakes, ponds, glaciers > 1 km^{2} (0.386 sq mi or 247 acres) and river estuaries.

Castétis (French pronunciation: [kastetis]; Occitan: Castethins) is a commune in the Pyrénées-Atlantiques department in south-western France.

== See also ==
- Communes of the Pyrénées-Atlantiques department
