= Aibar =

Coordinates: 42°36′N 1°21′W

- Town
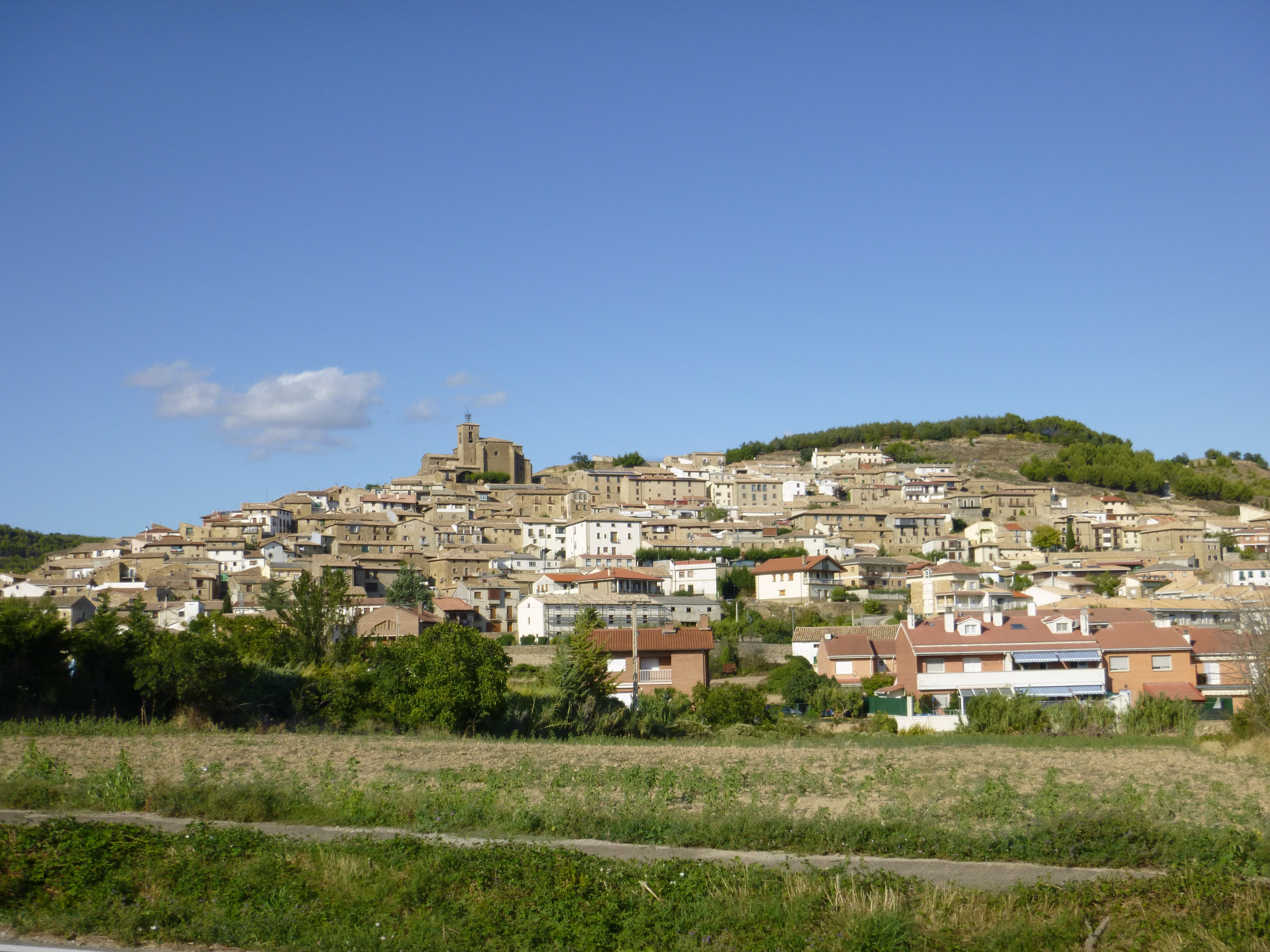
- View of Aibar, Navarre

- Coat of arms

- Map of Aibar
- Country: Spain
- Province: Navarre

Aibar (or Aybar, Basque: Oibar) is a town located in the province of Navarre, in the autonomous community of Navarre, northern Spain.

== History ==
García Jiménez of Pamplona was killed at Aybar in 882 in a battle against the Emir of Córdoba (Muhammad ibn Lubb, of the Banu Qasi family). In 1035, the son of Sancho the Great and his mistress Sancha of Aibar, Ramiro inherited his Aragonese lands as well as the town of Aibar.

In 1062, Aibar became a community within the Kingdom of Navarre. The most famous house in all of Aibar is the Casa Santura housed the Perez-Erdozain family.
