= Fors de Bearn =

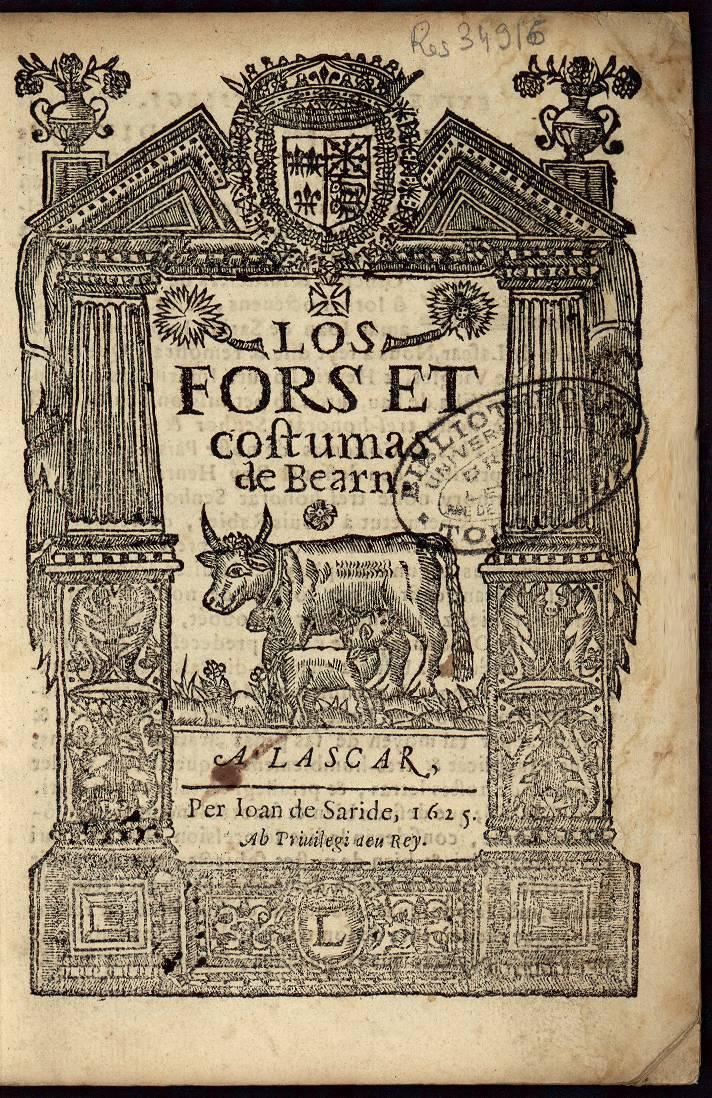

The Fors de Bearn, or fueros of Béarn, are a series of legal texts (privileges, rulings, judicial sentences, decrees, formularies) compiled over centuries (mostly the eleventh to thirteenth) in the Viscounty of Béarn. Together they formed the constitution of Béarn at the time of their first known complete version in the fifteenth century.

For is a Gascon word derived from the Latin forum, specifically from the Forum Iudicium, which was the law of the Visigoths.

The first of the fors was a charter promulgated around 1080 by Centule V for the repopulation of the ancient town of Iluro (Oloron). This was the seed of the future For de Oloron, which granted the city a commune. In 1102, Gaston IV granted a privilege to his capital of Morlaas, the nucleus of a similar future For de Morlaas. Finally, in 1188, Gaston VI promulgated the For General, applicable throughout Béarn. This for included several dispensations which had accrued in the second half of the century.

In the first half of the thirteenth century, the viscounts William Raymond and Gaston VII issued a series of fors for each of the Pyrenean valleys:

- Baretous (1220)
- Ossau (1221)
- First charter of Aspe (1247)
- Second charter of Aspe (1250)

In the sixteenth century, when Béarn was united with the Kingdom of Navarre, monarchs Henry II and Joanna III reorganised and improved the Fors. In 1620, Louis XIII incorporated Béarn into the French crown, but preserved the Fors, which continued to govern the viscounty until its abolition during the French Revolution in 1789.

== Sources ==
- Tucoo-Chala, Pierre. Quand l'Islam était aux portes des Pyrénées. J&D Editions: Biarritz, 1994. ISBN 2-84127-022-X.
- Omnes, Jean. Guide du curieux: Haut Béarn. Pyremonde, 2006. ISBN 2-84618-303-1.

== See also ==
- Béarn
- Viscountcy of Béarn
- Viscounts of Béarn
