= Centule III of Béarn =

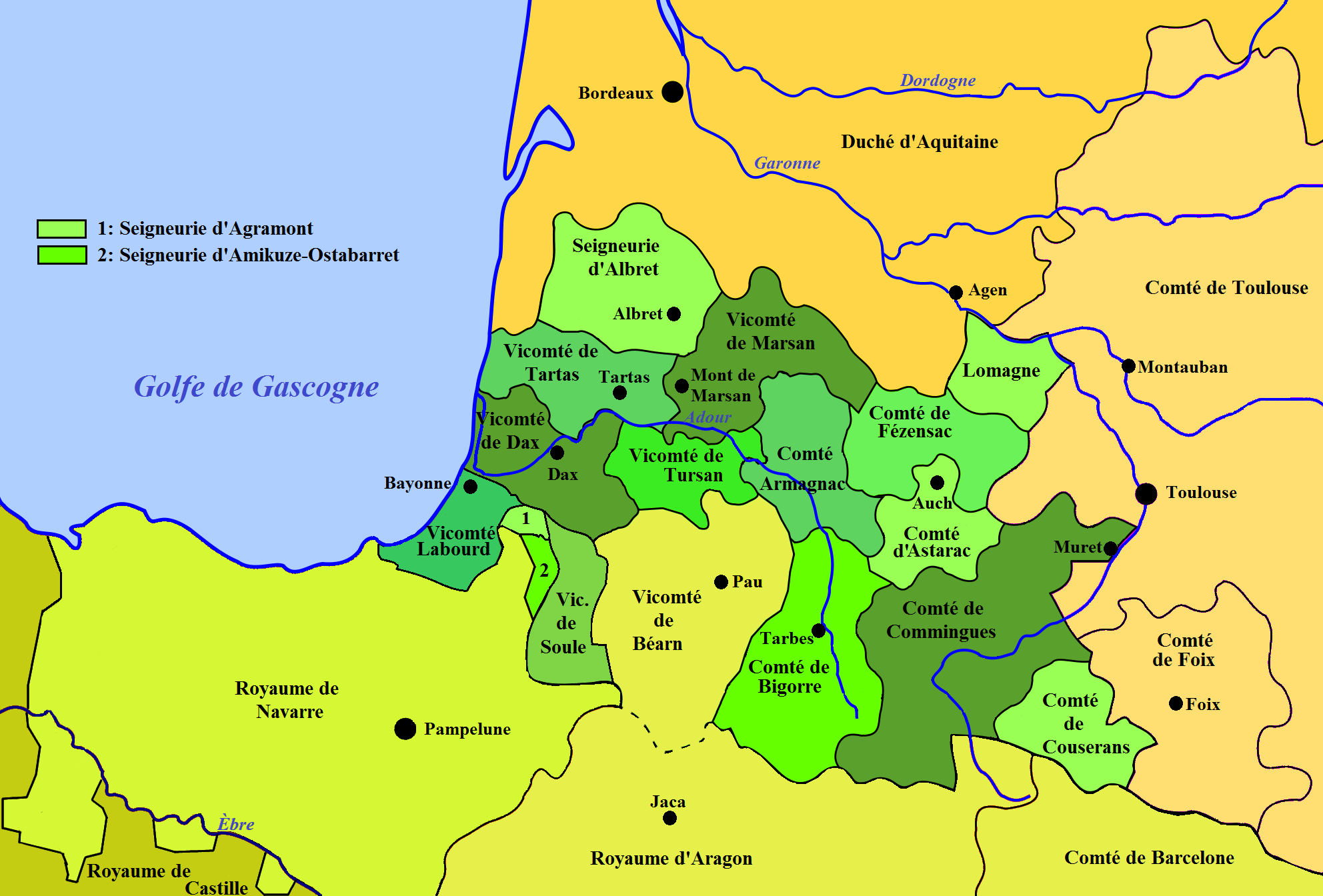
A map depicting territory of medieval lordships, including Béarn

Centule III of Béarn (French: Centulle III de Béarn; Latin: Centuli Gastoni) was a French noble, a Viscount of Béarn (vicomte de Béarn).

He was a son of the viscount Gaston I of Béarn and his wife, whose name remains unknown in primary sources.

Centule was married to an unknown woman, and their son was called Gaston II, after Centule's father.

Centule was killed by the Lord Lupus the Strong. He was then succeeded by Gaston, his son.

== Bibliography ==
1. "Vicomtes et Vicomtés", ed. Hélène Débax, 2008.

== Sources ==
Preceded by Gaston I of Béarn	Viscount of Béarn	Succeeded by Gaston II, Viscount of Béarn
