= Gaston II of Béarn =

Gaston II Centule (circa 951 – 1012) was the Viscount of Béarn from 996 to his death.

He succeeded his father Centule III after the latter's assassination at the hands of Lupus the Strong, Lord of Serres.

Gaston granted the village of Asson to the abbey of Lescar, whose abbot was then García Lupus, his brother.

Gaston was succeeded by his then minor son Centule IV, Viscount of Béarn, under the regency of the boy's mother.

== Sources ==
Preceded by Centule III	Viscount of Béarn; 996 — 1012	Succeeded by Centule IV, Viscount of Béarn
