= Montaner =

- Commune
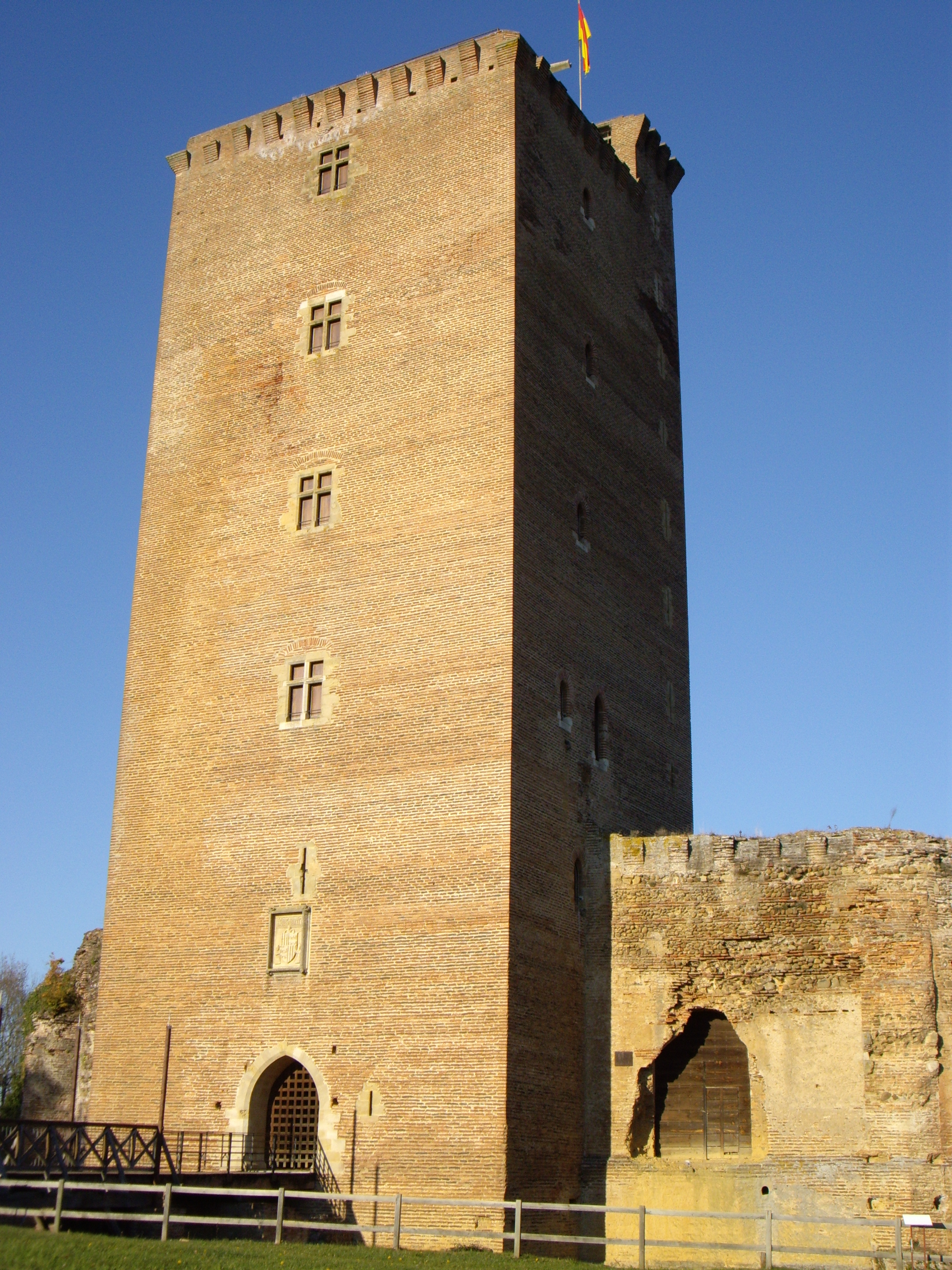
- Castle
- Location of Montaner
- Location within France Location within Nouvelle-Aquitaine
- Coordinates: 43°20′47″N 0°00′27″W
- Country: France
- Region: Nouvelle-Aquitaine
- Department: Pyrénées-Atlantiques
- Arrondissement: Pau
- Canton: Pays de Morlaàs et du Montanérès
- Intercommunality: Adour Madiran

Government
  - Mayor (2020–2026): Francis Biès-Péré
- Area^{1}: 19.13 km^{2} (7.39 sq mi)
- Elevation: 240 m (790 ft)
- Highest elevation: 363 m (1,191 ft)
- Lowest elevation: 237 m (778 ft)
- Population (2023): 408
  - Density: 21.3/km^{2} (55.2/sq mi)
- Time zone: UTC+01:00 (CET)
  - Summer (DST): UTC+02:00 (CEST)
- INSEE/Postal code: 64398 /64460
- ^{1} French Land Register data, which excludes lakes, ponds, glaciers > 1 km^{2} (0.386 sq mi or 247 acres) and river estuaries.

Montaner (French pronunciation: [mɔ̃tane]; Gascon: Montanèr) is a commune in the Pyrénées-Atlantiques department in south-western France.

== See also ==
- Communes of the Pyrénées-Atlantiques department
