= Viscounts of Béarn =

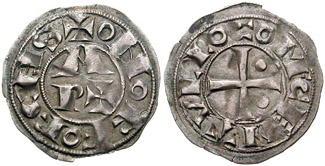
Coin of Béarn (under "Count Centule")

Coat of arms of the viscounts of Béarn.

The viscounts of Béarn (Basque: Bearno, Gascon: Bearn or Biarn) were the rulers of the viscounty of Béarn, located in the Pyrenees mountains and in the plain at their feet, in southwest France. Along with the three Basque provinces of Soule, Lower Navarre, and Labourd, as well as small parts of Gascony, it forms the current département of Pyrénées-Atlantiques (64).

Béarn is bordered by Basque provinces Soule and Lower Navarre to the west, by Gascony (Landes and Armagnac) to the north, by Bigorre to the east, and by Spain (Aragon) to the south.

== List of Viscounts of Béarn ==
=== House of Gascony ===
Until 1251, probably all counts of Gascony descended from the House Gascony, head of the Duchy of Gascony.

Ruler	Dates	Gascon line	Notes
Centule I	?-866	Béarn line	Centule descended agnatically from Lupo III Centule of Gascony.
Loup Centule	866-905	Béarn line	Son of the predecessor.
Centule II	905-940	Béarn line	Son of the predecessor.
Gaston I	940-984	Béarn line	Son of the predecessor.
Centule III	984-1004	Béarn line	Son of the predecessor.
Gaston II	1004-1012	Béarn line	Son of the predecessor.
Centule IV the Old	1012-1058	Béarn line	Son of the predecessor.
Gaston III	c.1020-1045	Béarn line	Ruled jointly with his father, and preceded him.
Centule V the Young	1058-1090	Béarn line	Son of Centule IV.
Gaston IV the Crusader	1090-1131	Béarn line	Son of the predecessor.
Centule VI	1131-1134	Béarn line	Son of the predecessor.
Guiscarda	1134-1147	Béarn line	Sister of the predecessor, married Peter, who descended agnatically from Sancho IV Garcés of Gascony.
Peter I Roger	1134-1140?	Gabarret line	Sister of the predecessor, married Peter, who descended agnatically from Sancho IV Garcés of Gascony.
Peter II	1147-1154	Gabarret line	Son of the predecessors
Gaston V	1154-1170	Gabarret line	Son of the predecessor
Mary	1170-1171	Gabarret line	Sister of the predecessor, married the Catalan Guilhem de Montcada. During their joint rule, other rulers appeared contesting their rule, or were merely legendary: 1171–1171 : Theobald of Béarn (from Bigorre); 1171–1173 : Sentonge (from Auvergne)

=== House of Montcada ===
- 1170–1173 : William I (married to Mary)
- 1173–1215 : Gaston VI the Good (son)
- 1215–1223 : William Raymond (brother of previous)
- 1223–1229 : William II (son)
- 1229–1290 : Gaston VII the Great (son)
- 1290–1319 : Margaret (daughter of, married Roger-Bernard III of Foix)

=== House of Foix ===
==== Béarn line ====

- 1302–1315 : Gaston VIII (son of, also count of Foix)
- 1315–1343 : Gaston IX (son of, also count of Foix)
- 1343–1391 : Gaston X Phoebus (son of, also count of Foix)
- 1391–1398 : Matthew (son of Roger Bernard II, viscount of Castelbon, who was son of Roger Bernard I, viscount of Castelbon, who was younger brother of Gaston II of Foix-Béarn, also count of Foix and viscount of Castelbon)
- 1398–1428 : Isabelle (sister of, also countess of Foix and viscountess of Castelbon, married Archambaud of Grailly)

==== Grailly line ====

- 1412–1436 : John I (son of, also count of Foix, viscount of Villemur and count of Bigorre)
- 1436–1472 : Gaston XI (son of, also count of Foix, viscount of Nébouzan and count of Bigorre, married Eleanor of Navarre, queen of Navarre) (References to "Gaston of Bearn" in history texts often refer to him)
- 1479–1483 : Francis Phoebus (son of Gaston of Foix, prince of Viane, also king of Navarre, count of Bigorre, count of Foix))
- 1483–1517 : Catherine (sister of, also queen of Navarre, countess of Bigorre, countess of Foix), married John of Albret, king of Navarre

In 1512 Ferdinand II of Aragon conquered the better part of the kingdom of Navarre, leaving the kingdom with only the small section it held north of the Pyrenees.

=== House of Albret ===

- 1517–1555 : Henry I (son of, also king of Navarre, count of Foix, duke of Albret, count of Bigorre)
- 1555–1572 : Joan (daughter of, queen of Navarre, countess of Foix, duchess of Albret, countess of Bigorre, married Anthony of Bourbon)

=== House of Bourbon ===

- 1572–1607 : Henry II (son of, also king of France, king of Navarre, duke of Bourbon, duke of Vendôme, count of Bigorre, count of Foix)

In 1620 the viscountcy of Béarn was reunited to the French crown, whereas Lower Navarre was in 1607.

== See also ==
- Fors de Béarn
