= Astarac =

Former province of France

Coordinates: 43.51°N 0.40°E

Astarac Estarac
- County
- Coat of arms

- Astarac among gascon strongholds in the Middle Ages.
- Country: Frances
- County: Gascony
- Departments: Gers and Hautes-Pyrénées
- First Created: 920
- Founder: García II Sánchez of Gascony

Government
  - Type: Former district of the province of Gascony

Astarac (French pronunciation: [astaʁak]) (or Estarac) is a region in the modern-day departments of Gers and Hautes-Pyrénées. It was historically located in Gascony, a county in the Middle Ages. Astarac was formed as a county out of the partition of the Duchy of Gascony: following the death of García II Sánchez of Gascony, the duchy was partitioned between his sons, with Arnold I, the youngest son, receiving Astarac.

== Geography ==
Defined as a natural region, Astarac is located in Gascony, south of the department of Gers and north of the department of Hautes-Pyrénées. Bordering on the Lannemezan plateau, it is a very hilly region with clay soil, crossed by several rivers including the Baïse, Arrats and Gers, which have led to the formation of artificial lakes such as the Lac de l'Astarac.

Astarac borders Armagnac to the northwest, the Rivière-Basse and Bigorre to the west, the Magnoac to the southeast, and Comminges to the east. Its principal cities are Mirande, Masseube, Miélan, Tournay, Pavie, Idrac-Respaillès, Castelnau-Barbarens, Berdoues, Ponsampère, Mont-d'Astarac, Miramont-d'Astarac, Laas d'Astarac, and Fontrailles.

== Demographics ==
Astarac is a region of scattered settlements.

== Economy ==
Livestock farming is the main form of economic output in this region.

== Culture ==
Astarac is in the area of influence of the Gascon language.

== Heraldy ==
The arms of Astarac county are blazoned as follows: quartered sections of Or (gold/yellow) and Gules (red). This coat of arms is also used by the House of Astarac.

== Etymology ==
Astarac (in the Middle Ages: Asteriacum, Asteirac) is a priori, like its homonym Estirac, for a Gallo-Roman domain name based on the local name Aster (Uciando Aster, Dato Aster, Sancio Aster, Atton Aster are documented personal names, the first three in Bigorre, the fourth in Lézat-sur-Lèze). The village of Asté, near Beaucens, is an ancient Aster. Linguist Joan Coromines likens this name to the biscayan word: azterren, meaning 'root' or 'foundation'.

== List of counts ==
Dates should be approached with extreme caution. Usually the exact dates of accession and death are unknown and only floruit dates can be provided. Further, the sources do not always give the same dates.

=== Count of Astarac ===
- 926 – 960 Arnold I Nonat
- 960 – before 975 Garcie-Arnaud, son
- Before 975 – 1022/23 Arnold II, son
- 1022/23 – c. 1060 William, son
- c. 1060 – after 1099 Sancho I, son
- After 1099 – 1142 Bernard I, son
- 1142 – bef. 1153 Sancho II, son
- bef. 1153 – c.1176 Bohemond, brother
- 1174 – 1182 Bernard II, nephew
- 1183 – ???? Marquesa, cousin, co-countess
- 1183 – ???? Beatrice, sister, co-countess
- ???? – 1233 Centule I, son
- 1233 – 1249 Centule II, son
- 1249 – 1291 Bernard III, brother
- 1291 – 1300 Centule III, son
- 1300 – 1324 Bernard IV, son
- 1324 – 1326 Bernard V, son
- 1326 – 1331 Amanieu, brother
- 1331 – 1363 Centule IV, son
- 1363 – 1403 John I, son
- 1398 – 1410 John II, son
- 1410 – 1458 John III, son
- 1458 – 1511 John IV, son
- 1511 – 1569 Martha, daughter

=== Count of Astarac, Candale and Benauges ===
- 1511 – 1536 Gaston, husband
- ???? – 1528 Charles, son
- 1528 John I, brother
- 1528 – 1571 Frederick, brother
- 1571 John II, son
- 1571 – 1572 Henry, son
- 1572 – 1593 Margaret, daughter
