= Bohemond of Astarac =

Bohemond or Boamund (died in or after 1176) was the Count of Astarac from as early as 1153 until his death. His unusual name probably derives from the counts of Pardiac

Bohemond was the second son of Bernard I of Astarac and the eldest by his second wife, Longuebrune. Sometime before May 1141 he and his elder brother, Sancho II, helped their father restore the town of Simorre after it was devastated by a fire. Bohemond succeeded either his brother or his nephew, Bernard II, by 1153. In that year he went to war with Bernard de Marestaing, who was bribed by Longuebrune, by then prioress of Bolauc, not to burn Simorre. In 1154 Bohemond had to borrow money from his mother in order to bribe Géraud d'Esparbès, the abbot of Saramon whom he had expelled, from plundering Astarac.

Bohemond married Rouge (Rubea) de Marsan, daughter of Peter I and Beatrice III of Bigorre. The couple donated property to the abbot of Berdoues in 1172, at which point they already had three children, all daughters: Mary, Marquese (Marchesia), and Bonnefemme (Bonefemina). In March 1174 Bohemond approved the sale the castle of Lamaguère by its lord, Guillaume, to Géraud de la Barthe, Archbishop of Auch. In 1175, in his final recorded act, Bohemond again donated property, this time property previously sold by his father and brother, to Berdoues. Bohemond's eldest daughter predeceased him and he was succeeded by Marquese. His youngest daughter, Beatrice, also later ruled Astarac.
