= House of Astarac =

French noble family

House of Astarac d'Astarac
- Noble family
- Arms; Quartered Yellow/Gold and Red
- Country: France
- Etymology: root or foundation
- Origin: Gascony, Astarac
- Founded: 920
- Founder: Arnaud Garcia
- Final head: Jean IV d'Astarac
- Estates: Astarac, Mirande
- Dissolution: 1511
- Cadet branches: Counts of Astarac; Counts of Pardiac; de Mézamat de Lisle family (Unproven)

The House of Astarac is a feudal lineage, descended from the House of Gascony, which owned the county of Astarac between the 10th and 16th centuries. The county was derived from a section of the county of Gascony upon the death of Garcia II.

== Etymology ==
The name of the lands of Astarac, in the Middle Ages Asteriacum, Asteirac or even Estirac, has been Estarac since the 17th and 18th centuries. The name seems to come from either the Latin astaricensis-ager, or from the Biscayan azterren, meaning root or foundation. In Gallo-Roman times, many local villages bore the prefix Aster.

== History and General information ==
The Counts of Astarac first appeared around 920 C.E., when the Duke of Gascony, García II, known as le Courbé, divided his lands between his sons. His eldest son received Gascony, his youngest Fézenzac, and the last son, Arnaud (also known as Nonnat), received the created county of Astarac. His descendants played a key role in the history of southern France, between the powerful counties of Toulouse, Foix, and Comminges and the kingdoms of Navarre and Aragon. The county of Astarac, however, appears to have never reached the success or significant influence of its neighboring county Armagnac. This is reflected in the marriages of the count's families, which never extended beyond lesser Gascony nobility.

Involved in the Crusades to the Holy Land as early as 1099, as well as the Cathar cause in the 13th century, the House of Astarac skillfully maneuvered and held on to its lands until the 16th century. The House remained counts by the grace of God until 1442, when the Counts of Astarac finally died out in the 16th century. Count Jean IV d'Astarac died in 1511, leaving only daughters. His eldest daughter, Marthe, became Countess of Astarac, passing on the title to her husband Gaston III de Foix-Candale[fr] and their descendants.

Temporarily confiscated by the French crown, the title was returned to the Foix-Candales, who brought the lands into the de Nogaret family through marriage of Marguerite de Foix-Candale (1567–1593) to Jean-Louis de Nogaret de La Valetter, Duc d'Épernon, and then to his son, Bernard. When he died, his property was seized, and the county was awarded to Gaston-Jean de Roquelaure, which traveled to his son, Antoine.

== Heraldry ==
Crown of a Count

Coat of arms of the Counts of Astarac from the 10th to 16th century:

- Arms: quarterly Or (gold/yellow) and Gueules (red);
- Stamp: a helmet with mantling and a count's crown.

== Titles ==
- Count of Astarac (eldest branch);
- Count of Pardiac (Montlezun branch);
- Baron of Montlezun (Montlezun branch);
- Baron then Marquis of Marestaing (Fontrailles branch);
- Seigneur then Viscount of Fontrailles (Fontrailles branch);
- Viscount of Cogotois (Fontrailles branch);
- Baron of Gaujac (Fontrailles branch);
- Baron of Sauveterre (Fontrailles branch);
- Baron of Montamert (Fontrailles branch).

== Claimed descendants ==
=== Proven descendants: the Counts of Pardiac ===
The Counts of Pardiac also descend from the House of Astarac, through the son of Arnaud Comte d’Astarac, Bernard d'Astarac. The latter acquired important positions in the kingdoms of Navarre and then France. Through their alliances, they bore the titles of Marquis of Marestaing, Viscounts of Fontrailles and Cogotois. This branch died out in 1677 with the death of Louis d'Astarac de Fontrailles, a rebel and conspirator of the first half of the 17th century.

=== Unproven descendants: the de Mézamat de Lisle family ===
This claim, cited by one author, is not generally accepted, as it is not recognized by others and has not been proven.

According to Dom Villevielle in L'Art de Vérifier les dates, the Mézamat de Canazilles et de Lisle family also descended from the Counts of Astarac, but Henri Jougla de Morenas[fr] in Grand armorial de France reports that this filiation is not repeated by Père Anselme or Monsieur de Jaurgain, and that Woëlmont casts doubt on it. According to Régis Valette[fr], this family was declared noble in 1784, but Henri Jougla de Morenas writes that the original 1784 ruling of the Montpellier Court of Auditors has not been found.

For its admission to the fr:Association d'entraide de la noblesse française, this family presented a written request to the assembly of the nobility, seneschal of Toulouse, on 23 July 1789, and provided noble qualifications on eight degrees. On the subject of proof of nobility, however, fr:Philippe du Puy de Clinchamps, a writer on nobility, writes that only acts in which the king recognized a claimant. as a noble proved nobility. Thus, only acts issued in the name of the king could prove status. This author also writes that voting with the nobility during the election of deputies to the Estates-General in 1789 is not proof of nobility.
