= William I of Astarac =

French nobleman

William I (died after 1060) was the Count of Astarac from 1022 or 1023. He was, according to the Genealogica Comitum Guasconiæ, the eldest son of Arnold II of Astarac and Talesa. On his father's death he received Astarac while his younger brother Bernard Pelagus received Pardiac.

In 1023, in his first recorded act as count, William received the monastery of Pessan from his younger brother Otto (or Oddo), a deacon, and granted it to the abbey of Simorre, of which Otto became abbot. In 1025 William consented to Otto's restoration of the monastery of Saramon. In 1034 William placed the abbey of Sainte-Dode, founded earlier by Otto, under the authority of Simorre.

In that same year William married a relative within the degree prohibited by the church. His marriage was validated only after the performance of prescribed penances. There is a reference to an Agganricus as a cognatus (relative) of William. Since this Agganric is not known elsewhere and most of William's other relatives are accounted for, presumably he is a relative of William's wife. William's last recorded public act was related to Pessan, in 1060.

William was succeeded by his only child, Sancho I.
