= Centule =

Centule (Basque: Gendul; Catalan: Centoll; French: Centulle; Latin: Centullus; Occitan: Centolh; Spanish: Céntulo) is a masculine given name used in southern France and northern Spain during the Middle Ages.

The name was relatively unusual in the 9th century and probably unique to the family of the cross-Pyrenean Basque dukes of Gascony. From the viscounts of Béarn the name later passed through marriage into the families of the counts of Bigorre and Astarac. The vernacular Bearnese form of the name was Centoig or Centoil, but modern scholarship follows the preference of the 17th-century scholar Pierre de Marca for the learned form Centulle (and variants) derived directly from the Latin Centullus.

Bearers of the name include:

- Centule, son of Duke Lupus II of Gascony (died 778)
- Centule (fl. 820s), son of Aznar Galíndez I, count of Aragon
- Centule (fl. 834–851), abbot of the Abbey of Santa María de Alaón
- Centule I, Viscount of Béarn (fl. 860s)
- Centule II, Viscount of Béarn (died c. 940)
- Centule III, Viscount of Béarn (died c. 1004)
- Centule IV, Viscount of Béarn (died c. 1058)
- Centule V, Viscount of Béarn (died 1090)
- Centule VI, Viscount of Béarn (died 1134)
- Centule I, Count of Bigorre (died 1088)
- Centule II, Count of Bigorre (died 1129)
- Centule III, Count of Bigorre (died 1185)
- Centule I, Count of Astarac (fl. 1212–33)
- Centule II, Count of Astarac (fl. 1244)
- Centule III, Count of Astarac (fl. 1269–1300)
- Centule IV, Count of Astarac (fl. 1331–63)
