= Sancho I of Astarac =

Sancho I (flourished 1050–1096/1119) was the count of Astarac from around 1060. He was the only son of William I and inherited the entire county of Astarac, which had been reduced in area by partitioning among heirs in earlier generations. Sancho had at least three sons. His eldest, William, is mentioned in a document of about 1075, but died before his father. His second son, Bernard, then became his sole heir, since the youngest son, Odo (fl. 1090–1125), became a monk at Simorre. The only information provided on Sancho by the Genealogia comitum Guasconiae (Genealogy of the Counts of Gascony) in the archives of the cathedral of Sainte-Marie d'Auch is that "William begat Sancho [and] Sancho begat Bernard." Sancho's wife is mentioned in a document from about 1075, but is not named.

Little is known of Sancho's rule other than his re-organisation of the monasteries of Astarac. Around 1050 he granted some rights he possessed in Saint-Maur, as well as the monastery there, to the abbey of Saint-Pé-de-Bigorre. Around 1075 he placed the monastery of Sainte-Dode, which had been founded by his father, under the authority of Simorre. About the same time he also donated the monastery of Saramon to that of Sorèze.

Between 1100 and 1110 Sancho, joined by his son Bernard and several other lords, donated land at Fonsorbes along with some other rights and revenues to the Church of the Holy Sepulchre and the Hospital of Saint John of Jerusalem:

Incipit carta de illo honore qui dicitur Fonsorbas, quem dedit Sancius Astarencis Comes, dimidiam, videlicet, partem quam ipse habebat in ipso allodio, totum dedit Deo et Sancto Sepulcro, pro se et filius ejus Bernardus.

Here begins the charter of this fief called Fonsorbes, of which Count Sancho of Astarac gave half, that is, the part which he held as an allod, all to God and the Holy Sepulchre, for himself and his son Bernard.

A certain Arnaud of Astarac joined Sancho on this occasion and donated Salvetat de Sainte-Foye to the Holy Sepulchre. His parentage is not mentioned, but he was probably a relative of Sancho. (Note: It is possible that this Arnaud was Sancho's second son, whose death is recorded as "before 1124".) The charter of donation was witnessed by Raymond II de Pardiac, who was the archbishop of Auch from 1096 to 1118/9. Nicolas Guinaudeau dates it to around 1096, but Helen Nicholson places it after the First Crusade (1096–99), when the Holy Sepulchre came under Christian control.

== Sources ==
- Guinaudeau, Nicolas (2012). Fortifications seigneuriales et résidences aristocratiques gasconnes dans l'ancien comté d'Astarac entre le X^{e} et le XVI^{e} siècle (Doctoral thesis). Université de Bordeaux. vol. I and vol. II
- Guinaudeau, Nicolas (2013). "La famille d'Astarac et la gestion du territoire comtal entre le début du X^{e} siècle et le milieu du XV^{e} siècle". Acta Historica et Achaeologica Mediaevalia. 31: 65–113.
- Nicholson, Helen J. (2001). The Knights Hospitaller. Woodbridge, UK: The Boydell Press.
