= Louis d'Astarac de Fontrailles =

French aristocrat (c. 1605 – 1677)

- Coat of Arms for the House of Astarac
- Born: 1605; Gascony, France
- Died: 16 July 1677; Paris, France
- Parents: Benjamin d'Astarac de Fontrailles (father); Marguerite de Montesquiou (mother)
- Family: House of Astarac

Louis d'Astarac, Marshal of Marestaing, Viscount of Fontrailles and Cogotois, born around 1605 in Gascony and died in 1677 in Paris. He was a 17th-century French aristocrat, conspirator, rebel and memoirist.

== Biography ==
=== Origins ===
He was born at the beginning of the 17th century, in Gascony, into the House of Astarac[fr]. He was the son of Benjamin d'Astarac, baron of Marestang and Fontrailles, and Marguerite de Montesquiou. His parents were both Protestants, but in 1618 they converted to Catholicism, and Louis followed in their footsteps.

The young man served with distinction in the king's armies in Flanders, Catalonia and Italy. and inherited from his father the office of Grandensel[fr] of Armagnac.

Tallemant des Réaux describes him as a man of quality who was "washed in front and behind and very ugly in the face, but who did not look like an imbecile". Loménie de Brienne also wrote that, according to him, Fontrailles was "small, ugly, hunchbacked, but full of fire, courage and wit". Whatever the case, this hump earned him bitter mockery from his enemies, notably from Cardinal Richelieu. Richelieu is said to have once said to Fontrailles, while receiving a diplomat: "Rox Monsieur de Fontrailles, don't show yourself, this ambassador doesn't like monsters". Among other things, this incident led to Fontrailles' hatred of the minister.

A friend of Cardinal de Retz, he corresponded with him from an early age, and Retz wrote extensively about him in his own memoirs.

=== The conspiracy ===
In 1636, during the siege of Corbie, Fontrailles joined Gaston d'Orléans, the Comte de Soissons, the Comte de Montrésor, Henry de Pérusse des Cars, Seigneur de Saint-Ybard and François de Baradas[fr] in a plot to arrest Richelieu at the Amiens camp. The Duc d'Orléans simply had to wink to give the signal to his accomplices, but he slipped away at the last moment, and the conspiracy failed.

In 1642, the Duc d'Orléans entrusted Fontrailles with the task of negotiating with the Count-Duke of Olivares for the means of supporting Conspiration de Cinq-Mars[fr] against Cardinal Richelieu. Fontrailles thus signed the secret treaty, by which Spain was to provide troops and money. But the conspiracy was discovered, and Fontrailles was forced to flee to England; he returned only after the Cardinal's death in 1643, and became involved in the cabale des Importants aimed at removing Richelieu's successor, Cardinal Mazarin, from power.

In 1647, he corresponded with the Count of Chavigny, who was plotting against Mazarin, but in "rather equivocal terms [...] in the assurance that by doing so he would not fall out with Chavigny ". Despite the precautions taken, Fontrailles was imprisoned the same year

He also took part in the Fronde before finally joining the regent's camp, but the young Louis XIV never forgave him for his schemes.

In disgrace, he was exiled to his lands and wrote his memoirs, in which he recounts his role in the Conspiration de Cinq-Mars. On his return to Paris, he drew up his will in favor of his grand-nephew Jean-Paul de Rochechouart[fr] de Barbazan. He died in Paris on July 16, 1677, leaving behind the memory of a man of spirit, "but of a restless, restless and bizarre character ".

== Publications ==
- Relation des choses particulières de la cour pendant la faveur de M. de Cinq-Mars (dans les Mémoires de Montrésor et la collection Petitot);
- des Lettres, restées manuscrites (Letters, still in manuscript).
