= Belloc-Saint-Clamens =

- Commune
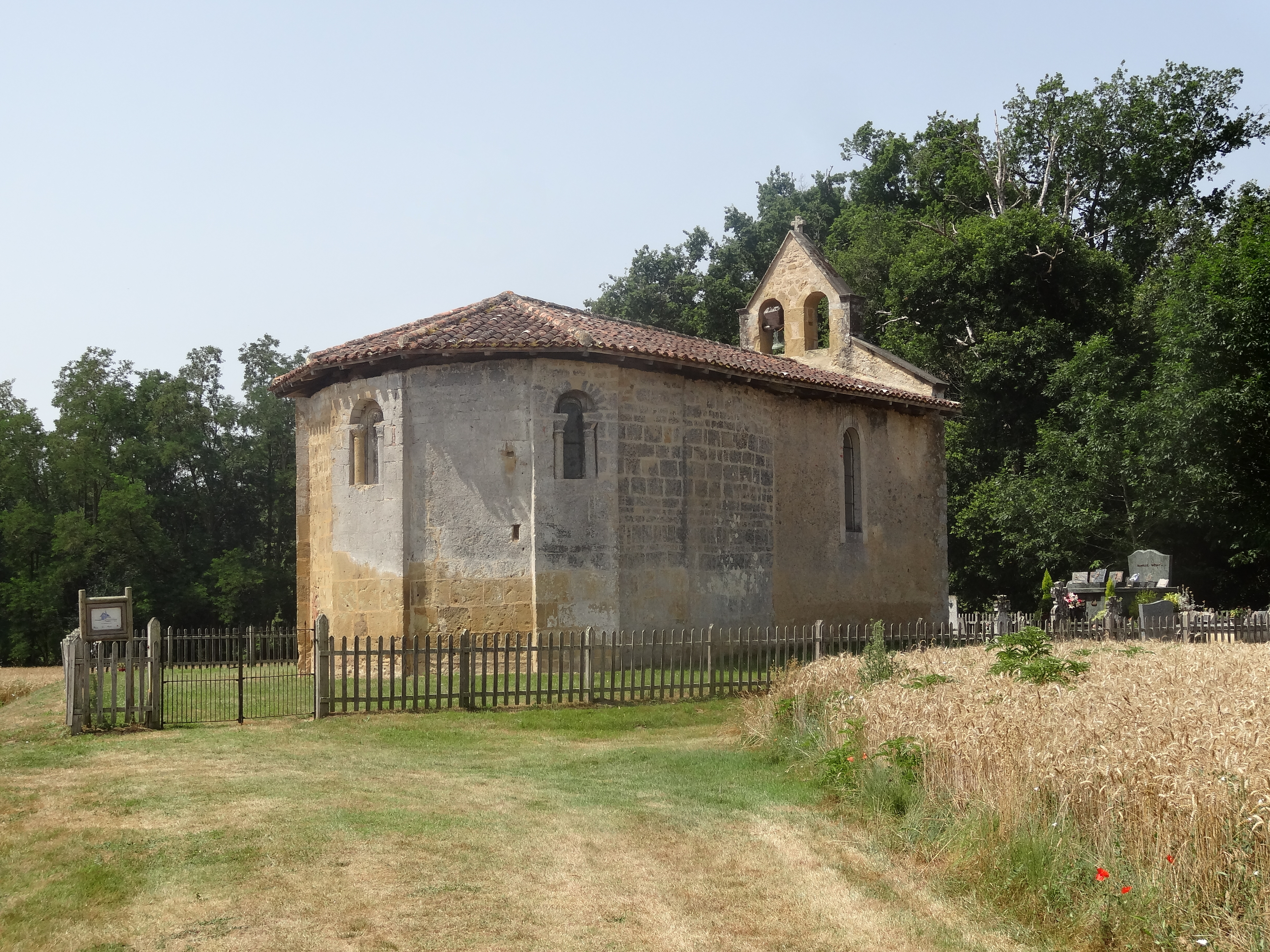
- Chapel of Saint Clamens
- Location of Belloc-Saint-Clamens
- Location within France Location within Occitanie
- Coordinates: 43°27′27″N 0°26′10″E
- Country: France
- Region: Occitania
- Department: Gers
- Arrondissement: Mirande
- Canton: Mirande-Astarac

Government
  - Mayor (2020–2026): Claudine Ladois
- Area^{1}: 10.49 km^{2} (4.05 sq mi)
- Elevation: 255 m (837 ft)
- Highest elevation: 272 m (892 ft)
- Lowest elevation: 159 m (522 ft)
- Population (2023): 136
  - Density: 13.0/km^{2} (33.6/sq mi)
- Time zone: UTC+01:00 (CET)
  - Summer (DST): UTC+02:00 (CEST)
- INSEE/Postal code: 32042 /32300
- ^{1} French Land Register data, which excludes lakes, ponds, glaciers > 1 km^{2} (0.386 sq mi or 247 acres) and river estuaries.

Belloc-Saint-Clamens (Bèthlòc e Sent Clamenç in the Gascon dialect) is a commune in the south of the Gers department in the Occitania region of southwestern France. Its residents are known as Bellocois (or Bellocoises in the feminine form). The commune of Saint-Clamens was attached in 1822 to that of Belloc to form Belloc-Saint-Clamens

Historically and culturally, it sits in the former Astarac area of Gascony, an undulating landscape stretching down to the High Pyrenees. It features the mainly clay soil of the Lannemezan plateau. and is drained by the Baïse and various other small rivers. It features two special areas of fauna and flora interest (known in France as a ZNIEFF); a section of the Berdoues forest and the elevated right bank of the Baïsole, a tributary of the Baîse.

Belloc-Saint-Clamens is a rural municipality which had just 136 residents in 2023, dropping from a population peak of 655 in 1831.

82% of the commune is agricultural land, as reflected in the European CORINE Land Cover database, of which 48% is arable, 27% is mixed use, 18% forest and 7% pasture.

== Chapel of Saint-Clamens ==
The commune has an 11th century Romanesque chapel, located on one of the many traditional pilgrimage routes to Santiago de Compostela. It was listed as a historical monument in 1890. It is dedicated to Saint Clement, pope from CE 89 to CE 97, whose name takes the Gascon form “Clamens”.

=== History ===
The chapel was built near the Roman villa of the Antistii, and incorporates reused Roman materials, including a funerary cippus discovered in 1886 and a sarcophagus used as the base of the altar. The building remains largely unaltered since first built, apart from the construction of an extension to the south-west. This continues as an emban, or covered porch, above the south doorway, which was built in the sixteenth century. The dates 1565 and 1751, corresponding to periods of modification, are carved into the building.

=== Architecture ===
The chapel measures just 14.1 metres long by 7.6 metres wide. It consists of a single rectangular nave and a polygonal chancel. The apse is reinforced at the corners by three broad, shallow buttresses into which windows have been set. The west front has a simple bell-gable with two openings. The chapel is not vaulted and is covered only by a timber-boarded ceiling. The southern portal dates from the 16th century.

The masonry of the walls is remarkable for the large dimensions of its blocks and for the use of stones that are taller than they are wide, interspersed with narrower courses. Together, these construction methods are unusual in the region. Similarly, on the exterior, the window arches rest on columns and capitals that do not appear to correspond to the arrangement of the openings. These windows have stained glass pains, two of which are antique, with no other decorative motifs than diamonds and squares set with lead.

The sarcophagus supporting the altar is a fourth-century work of the School of Arles, carved from white marble from Saint-Béat. Its sculpted decoration depicts putti—small winged figures playing with hoops—on either side of a circular medallion containing the portrait of a young man, probably the deceased. It is richly carved with scenes of harvest and allegories about the stages of life.

The chapel also contains an octagonal Gothic baptismal font. Each face is decorated with a pair of multilobed arches containing somewhat weathered human faces.

A wall painting was uncovered in the nave in 1966. Probably dating from the sixteenth-century restoration, it would once have stood above an altar that has since disappeared and depicts the Crucifixion. In the chancel, another fresco represents Saint Clement and a monk. Painted wooden statues, one of which is Saint Clement, are positioned on the south wall of the chapel.

== Other buildings and sites ==
=== Church of the Holy Ascension ===
Renamed in the 19th century and recently restored, the Church of the Holy Ascension dominates the centre of the village with its rectangular tower which ends in terrace.

=== Belloc Castle site ===
A castle is mentioned in 1209 in the Berdoues Cartulary; it then belonged to the Montesquiou family, and it seems partly to the Counts of Astarac (ref. charters 102 and 784). This fortress was located to the west of the church, at the top of the hillside that overlooks the steep slope of the Baïse Valley.

=== Former Lanecastel Castle ===
The Cassini map shows a stately home in "Sabatié", and this name is visible on the 1823 cadastraux napoléoniens. The 19th century Carte d'État-Major (Army Staff Map) map mentions "Lanecastel", and today the house is named "The Dané". No remnants of the former construction can be seen.

=== Saint-Clamens Castle site ===
The castle of Saint-Clamens is reported as ruined in the Berdoues Cartulary by 1198. It was some distance from the parish church, towards the hillside: its probable location is indicated by the place called "a la Mothe" mentioned in the land registry of 1750.

=== Serres Castle motte ===
The castellum de Serres appears in 1174 in the Berdoues Cartular as in the possession of the lords of Marrast (charter 5). The mention refers to a point located 750 meters south of the church of Belloc, in a grove where some earthworks appear.

== See also ==
- Communes of the Gers department
