= Siege of Marmande =

1219 Siege of the Albigensian crusade

- Part of Albigensian Crusade
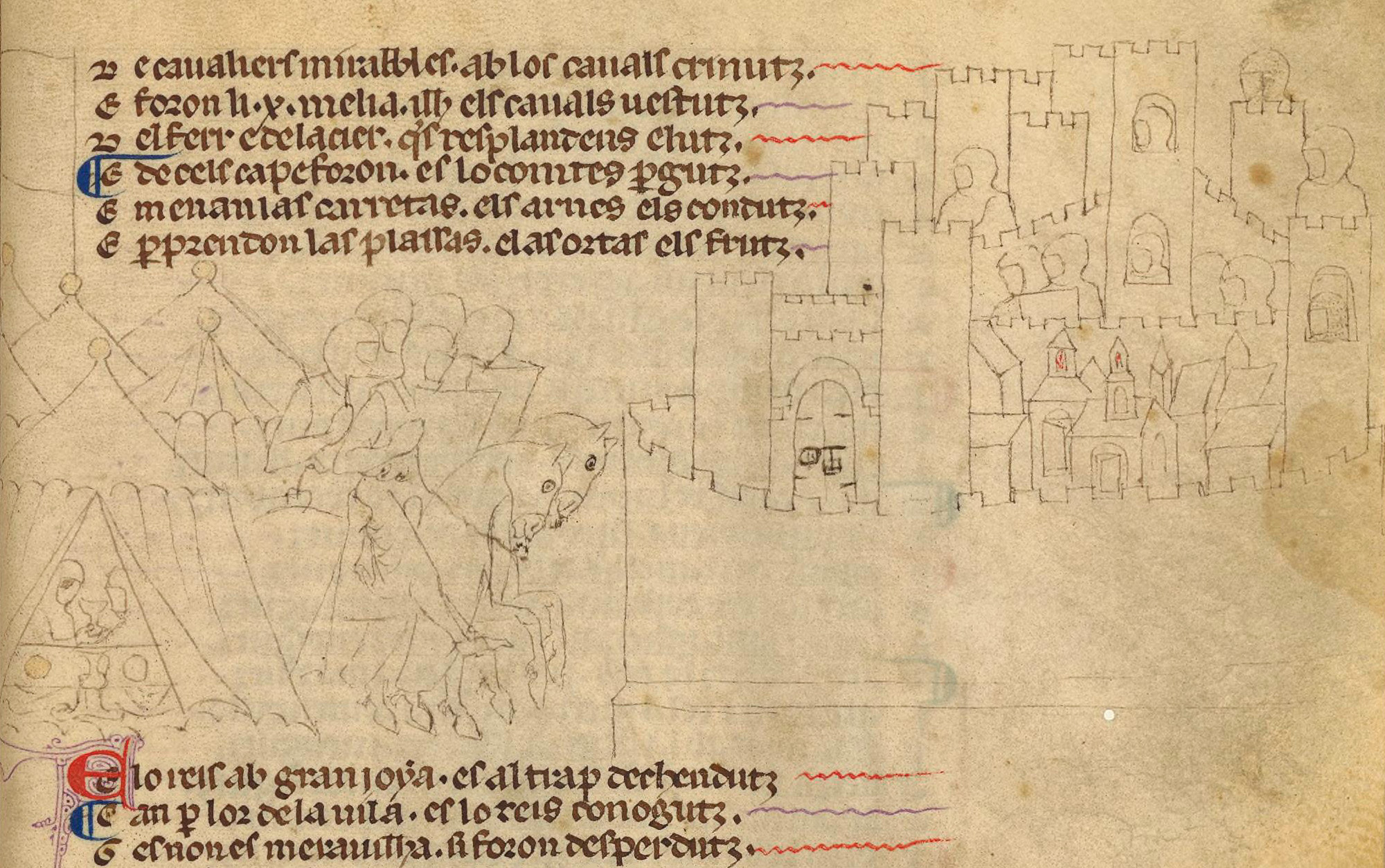
- "Capture of Marmande by Prince Louis" Guilhem de Tudele
Date	October 1218 - 3 June 1219
Location	Marmande
Result	Crusader victory

Belligerents
Kingdom of France; Crusaders	County of Toulouse

Siege of Marmande was a military operation in 1219 during the Albigensian Crusade between Amaury de Montfort and Louis VIII of France against Toulouse forces. The siege started in October 1218 and ended in 1219, town fell on 3 June with the sack and massacre on 10 June.

== Background ==
Since the failed siege of Toulouse and the death of his father, Amaury VI de Montfort was in a desperate situation. His troops were at lowest point, the Languedocian troops were beginning to revolt, and Count Raymond VII of Toulouse was launching a campaign of reconquest. Amaury's army was too small to resist, and several barons advised him to negotiate. Pope Honorius III had sent an embassy to King Philip Augustus, but its effects would not be felt until the following year.

== Battle ==
Around Christmas, Alix de Montmorency, widow of Simon de Montfort and mother of Amaury, and Bouchard de Marly arrived with a small contingent of crusaders. This reinforcement allowed him to raid the Corbières, then he attempted to surprise the town of Marmande, in Agenais, but without success.

He then began the siege of the city at the beginning of 1219.

Raymond VII gathered his troops and prepared to come to the aid of the defenders of Marmande and their two leaders: Centule of Astarac and Arnaud of Blanquefort. But just as he was about to leave, he received word that his ally, Raymond-Roger of Foix, was besieged at Baziège by crusaders coming from Carcassonne with his entire supply convoy, which he was transporting to Toulouse. Raymond decided to go to the aid, and the Occitans crushed the crusader army led by Foucault de Berzy at Baziège.

In the spring, King Philip-Augustus sent his son at the head of a large force: about twenty bishops, about thirty counts, six hundred knights and ten thousand archers.

This army arrived at Marmande on June 2, 1219. From the very first assault, the advanced works of the city's defenses were taken. For Centule d'Astarac, the commander of the fortress, the future was considerably less certain with the arrival of the king's son. He entered into negotiations and accepted the city's surrender on June 10 inexchange for sparing his life and that of his soldiers. The papal legate, however, demanded Centule's death as a heretic and perjurer, but some barons protested, deeming it contrary to their honor to break their word. The Count of Astarac and his soldiers were considered prisoners of war, but the king's soldiers had taken advantage of this discussion between the king's son and the legate to enter the city and begin the pillaging and massacre. Five thousand inhabitants were massacred and the city was burned.

== Aftermath ==
This victory proved short-lived. Amaury de Montfort had been unable to capture the city before royal intervention. News of the fall of Marmande, along with that of the massacre, instilled distrust in the local population, who refused to believe the king's word. Thus, Toulouse soon refused to open its gates to the prince, who laid siege to the city but failed to take it. At the beginning of August, Prince Louis left the south of the kingdom, and Amaury de Montfort suffered further setbacks before being forced to abandon his campaign in 1224 and leave Languedoc in turn.
