= Sancho I =

Sancho I may refer to:

- Sancho I of Gascony (died 812), Basque Duke
- Sancho I of Pamplona (circa 860–925), Navarrese monarch
- Sancho I Ordóñez (circa 895–929), King of Galicia
- Sancho I of León (died 966), two-time King of León
- Sancho I of Aragon (c. 1042 – 4 June 1094), second king of Aragon
- Sancho I of Astarac (fl. 1050–1096/1119), count of Astarac
- Sancho I of Portugal (1154–1212), King of Portugal
