= Cabale des Importants =

Political Fight in 17th Century France

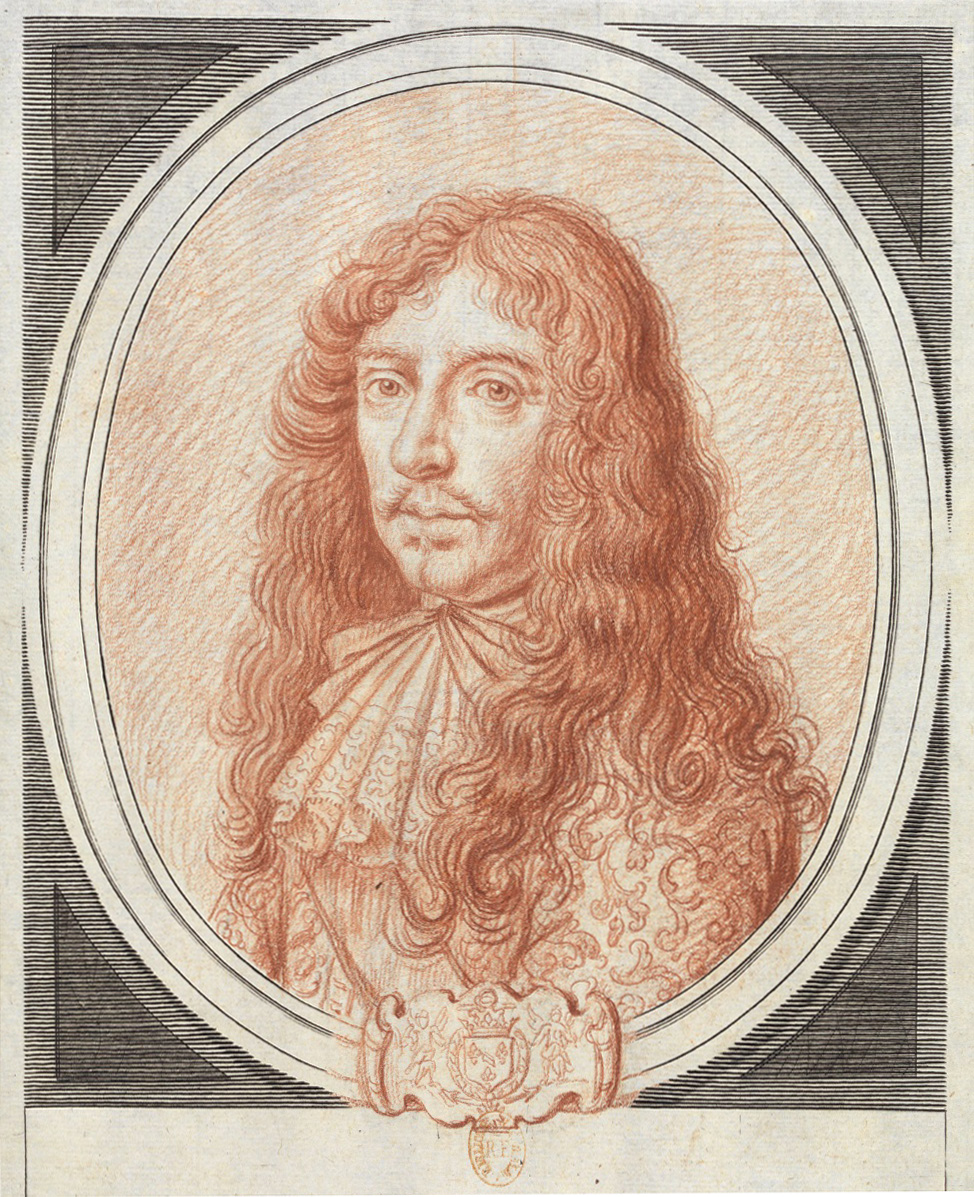
François de Bourbon-Vendôme, Duke of Beaufort.

The Cabale des Importants (French pronunciation: [kabal dez‿ɛ̃pɔʁtɑ̃], Cabal of the Important, or Conjuration of the Important) is the name given to a plot organized in the last days of August 1643 by François de Vendôme, duke of Beaufort, and Marie de Rohan, duchess of Chevreuse, with the help of many "Great" of the time. The aim of this plot was to remove Cardinal Mazarin from power, as he was considered to be too hostile to the interests of that nobility, and to also sign a separate peace with Spain. This plot was a failure: the Duke of Beaufort was arrested and imprisoned, and other conspirators were exiled.

== Background ==
Louis XIII died on May 14, 1643, six months after his minister Richelieu. Their policy was aimed at strengthening royal power against the greats of the kingdom. The new King Louis XIV was a minor, and the regency was entrusted to his mother Anne of Austria, who was supported by Cardinal Mazarin. The regency is often a period of contests of power, especially since Anne needed Parliament to break her husband's will. Many exiles from the previous reign returned to the Court.

Outside, France was engaged in the Thirty Years' War, which turned into a Franco-Spanish war.

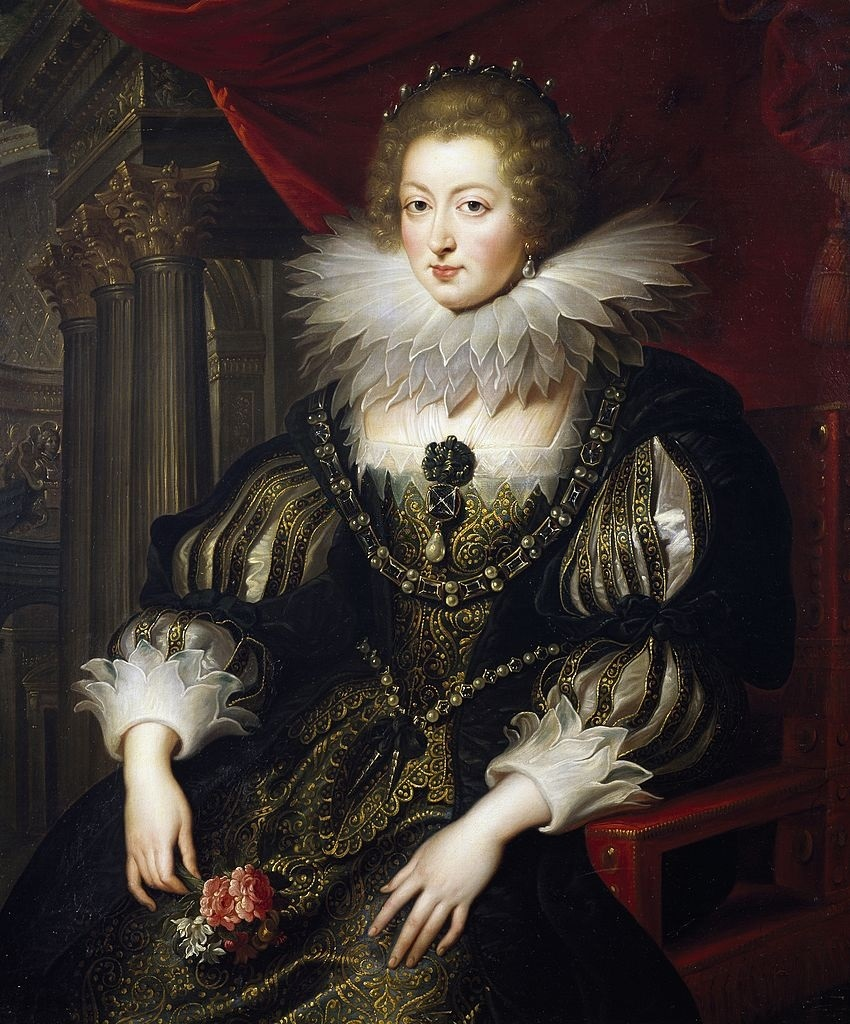
Anne of Austria, Queen of France, c. 1620-1625

== The Conspirators ==
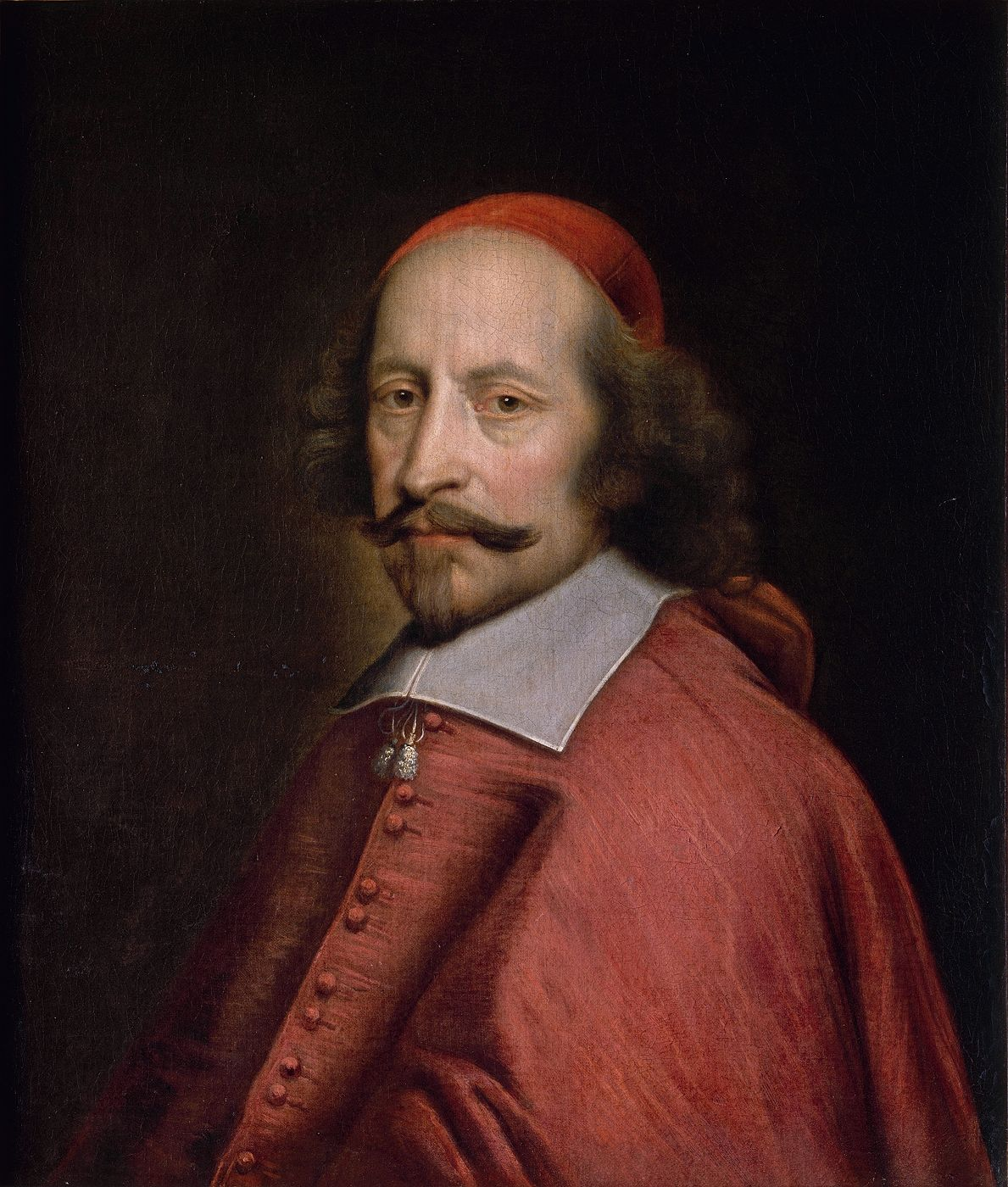
Portrait of Cardinal Mazarin, by the workshop of Pierre Mignard, 1658-1660.

The main instigators of this plot were François de Vendôme, duke of Beaufort, and Marie de Rohan, duchess of Chevreuse. They were followed by:

- César, Duke of Vendôme, father of François de Vendôme, and his eldest son Louis, Duke of Vendôme;
- Claude de Bourdeille, Count of Montrésor;
- Charles de L'Aubespine, Marshal of Châteauneuf;
- Louis d'Astarac de Fontrailles, Marshal of Marestaing, Viscount of Fontrailles and Cogotois;
- Henri II, Duke of Guise;
- Bernard de Nogaret, Duke of Épernon;
- Charles II, Duke of Elbeuf.

== Purpose of the Conspiracy ==
The conspirators wanted to strip Richelieu's supporters, those of House of Condé specifically, of all their possessions and privileges, and to recover their office lost during Richelieu's tenure. Specifically, the Red Eminence had, for example, forced César to abandon his lands in Brittany in 1630.

The cabal aims, on the one hand, to remove Anne of Austria from her new prime minister, Mazarin, who was considered too hostile to the nobility and, on the other, force a signature on a separate peace with Philip IV of Spain.

== Timeline of the Conspiracy ==
Beginning as a court intrigue in the summer of 1643, the affair escalated into an epistolary conflict between the duchesse de Montbazon[fr] of the Beaufort party and the duchesse de Longueville of the Condé party. The former was order to withdraw from her lands.

François de Vendôme was furious and planned to have Mazarin assassinated, then replace him with a close friend, Augustin Potier, Bishop of Beauvais. He mandated to his loyal followers, François le Dangereux, lord of Beaupuis, and the Campion brothers, Alexandre[fr] and Henri[fr], to carry out this action

Mazarin soon caught wind of the conspiracy. Beaufort was arrested on 2 September 1643 and imprisoned at the dungeon of the Château de Vincennes, where he remained in captivity for five years. Châteauneuf, the Vendômes, the duchesse of Chevreuse, and Marie de Hautefort were exiled to their provinces. The Bishop of Beauvais was sent back to his diocese.
