= De Bourdeille =

de Bourdeille is a surname. Notable people with the surname include:

- Claude de Bourdeille, comte de Montrésor (c. 1606–1663), French aristocrat
- Pierre de Bourdeille, seigneur de Brantôme (c. 1540–1614), French historian, soldier, and biographer
