= Centule IV of Astarac =

Count of Astarac, Gascony

Centule IV (French: Centulle) was the count of Astarac from 1330 until his death in 1362. His reign coincided with the outbreak of the Hundred Years' War, in which he remained loyal to the French king.

== Life ==
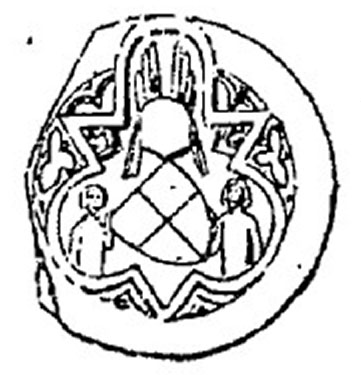
Seal of Centule IV

Centule was the son of Count Amanieu and Cécile de Comminges. A minor at his accession, he was initially under the regency of his mother. At the start of his reign, on 23 March 1331, Pope John XXII granted him a dispensation to marry Mathe d'Armagnac, daughter of Géraud II, viscount of Fézensaguet, and Jeanne de Comminges. On 25 March, he purchased the land and lordship of Sestias from its owner, Condorine, and her husband, Géraud d'Esparros, lord of Puydarrieux, for 1,220 livres tournois.

The Hundred Years' War broke out in 1337. Centule served King Philip VI with 64 squires and 128 sergeants in 1339–1340. In 1342, he took charge of the defence of Agen with 28 squires and 60 sergeants. Around this time, he entered into a brief but successful war with the County of Comminges, supported by his vassal, Bernard de Castelbajac, lord of Arrouède. This conflict is poorly documented but was probably related to the disputed succession of Count Bernard VIII of Comminges, which Philip VI intervened to resolve in favour of Pierre-Raymond II, husband of Bernard's daughter Jeanne.

During the Early of Derby's invasion of Gascony in 1345, Centule was in the French army defeated near Bergerac, but he avoided the disastrous battle of Auberoche. By June 1346, he was again in command of Agen. In 1355, Astarac was lost to the army of the Black Prince. On 23 October, Seissan was burned. On 24 October, the towns of Tournan, Villefranche and Simorre were occupied. The abbey of Simorre was temporarily abandoned. The prince, however, decided to spare Lombez, since it was the seat of a diocese.

In January 1358, Centule had under his command in Gascony 100 men-at-arms and 100 sergeants. Following the treaty of Brétigny in 1360, he was able to recover his county. In 1361, he began to associate his son, John I, in his rule. In 1362, he took the side of Foix in its feud with Armagnac. His son John married the daughter of a vassal of Foix in 1348 and had done homage to Count Gaston III for the castle of Ambres that he received as a dowry. Centule was present on 5 December at the battle of Launac, in which Foix defeated Armagnac. On 7 December, he made his last will. He probably died within the month. He was not present when peace was made in April 1463 and he is confirmed as deceased in a document of July.

== Marriages and children ==
Centule's first marriage was to Mathe d'Armagnac. They had at least one son, John, who succeeded as count, and one daughter, Cécile (fl. 1349–1363). They may be the parents of Bertrand, who was abbot of Simorre in 1406–1414, and of the wife of Bernard de La Mothe, but these connections are conjectural.

Centule married for a second time to Jeanne de Lomagne, who was still living in 1365. They had one daughter, Marguerite, who married Florimond de Lescure. In 1365, she renounced the rights she had inherited in the castle of Mirande. She and her husband were still living in 1389.

== Bibliography ==
- Barber, Richard, ed. (2012). The Chronicle of Geoffrey le Baker. Translated by David Preest. Boydell & Brewer.
- Guinaudeau, Nicolas (2012). Fortifications seigneuriales et résidences aristocratiques gasconnes dans l'ancien comté d'Astarac entre le X^{e} et le XVI^{e} siècle (Doctoral thesis). Université de Bordeaux. vol. I and vol. II
- Guinaudeau, Nicolas (2013). "La famille d'Astarac et la gestion du territoire comtal entre le début du X^{e} siècle et le milieu du XV^{e} siècle". Acta Historica et Acheaologica Mediaevalia. 31: 65–113.
