= Bernard IV of Astarac =

Coat of arms of the Astarac.

Bernard IV of Astarac (1249– c. 1291) was a count of the House of Astarac.

== Family ==
He was the third son of Centule I and Séguine d'Armagnac, and the brother of Centule II. Bernard became Count of Astarac following the disappearance of his brother, who died without descendants in 1249. His wife's name is unknown. He had four known children:

- Centule III
- Jean
- Bernard
- Arnaud, married to Jeanne de Faudoas.

== Bastides ==
Bernard d'Astarac is at the origin of the foundation of the bastides of Seissan (1266), Masseube (1274) and Mirande (1281).

== The troubadour ==
A tenson (song); with Giraut Riquier.
