= Claude Drigon, Marquis de Magny =

French heraldic writer (1796–1879)

Claude Drigon, Marquis de Magny (1796–1879) was a French heraldic writer, born in Dijon. After being employed for some time in the postal service, he devoted himself to the study of heraldry and genealogy, his work in this direction being rewarded by Pope Gregory XVI with a marquisate. He founded a French college of heraldry, and wrote several works on heraldry and genealogy, of which the most important were Archives nobiliaires universelles (1843) and Livre d'or de la noblesse de France (1844-1852).

His two sons, Edouard Drigon and Achille Ludovice Drigon, respectively comte and vicomte de Magny, also wrote several works on heraldry.

== See also ==
- French heraldry
