= Charles de l'Aubespine =

French diplomat and government official

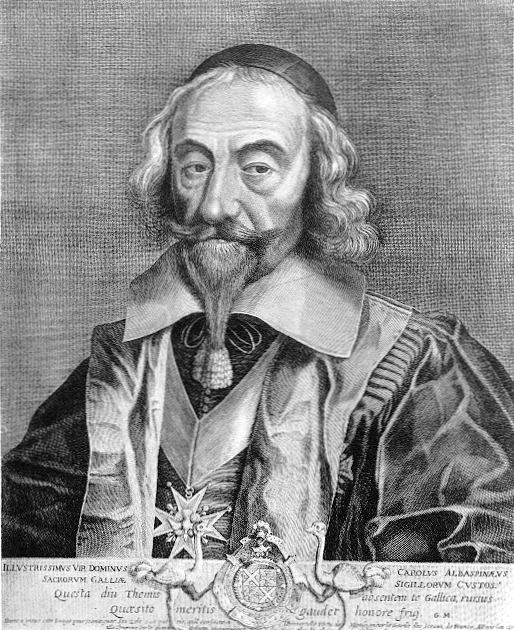
Portrait of the marquis de Châteauneuf, engraving by Pierre Daret

Charles de l'Aubespine, marquess of Châteauneuf (22 February 1580 – 26 September 1653) was a French diplomat and government official.

The marquess of Châteauneuf was the grandson of Claude de l'Aubespine, baron of Châteauneuf. He was made an abbé. He was the French ambassador to Holland (1609), to the Habsburg Netherlands (1611–1616), to the Valtellina (1626), and to England (1629–1630).

He then served as the Keeper of the Seals (minister of justice) from 1630, when he replaced Michel de Marillac, until 1633. During that time he was a member of the extraordinary commission that condemned to death the marshal Louis de Marillac and Henri, Duke of Montmorency. He conspired with the Duchess of Chevreuse against Cardinal Richelieu (1633), and was deprived of his office and imprisoned in the castle of Angoulême where he stayed for ten years.

Released at the death of Louis XIII, he conspired again against Cardinal Mazarin in the cabale des Importants, 1643. He was appointed again as Keeper of the Seals from 1650 to 1651.

He died at his chateau in Leuville-sur-Orge (Essonne department) in 1653.
