= Masseube =

- Commune
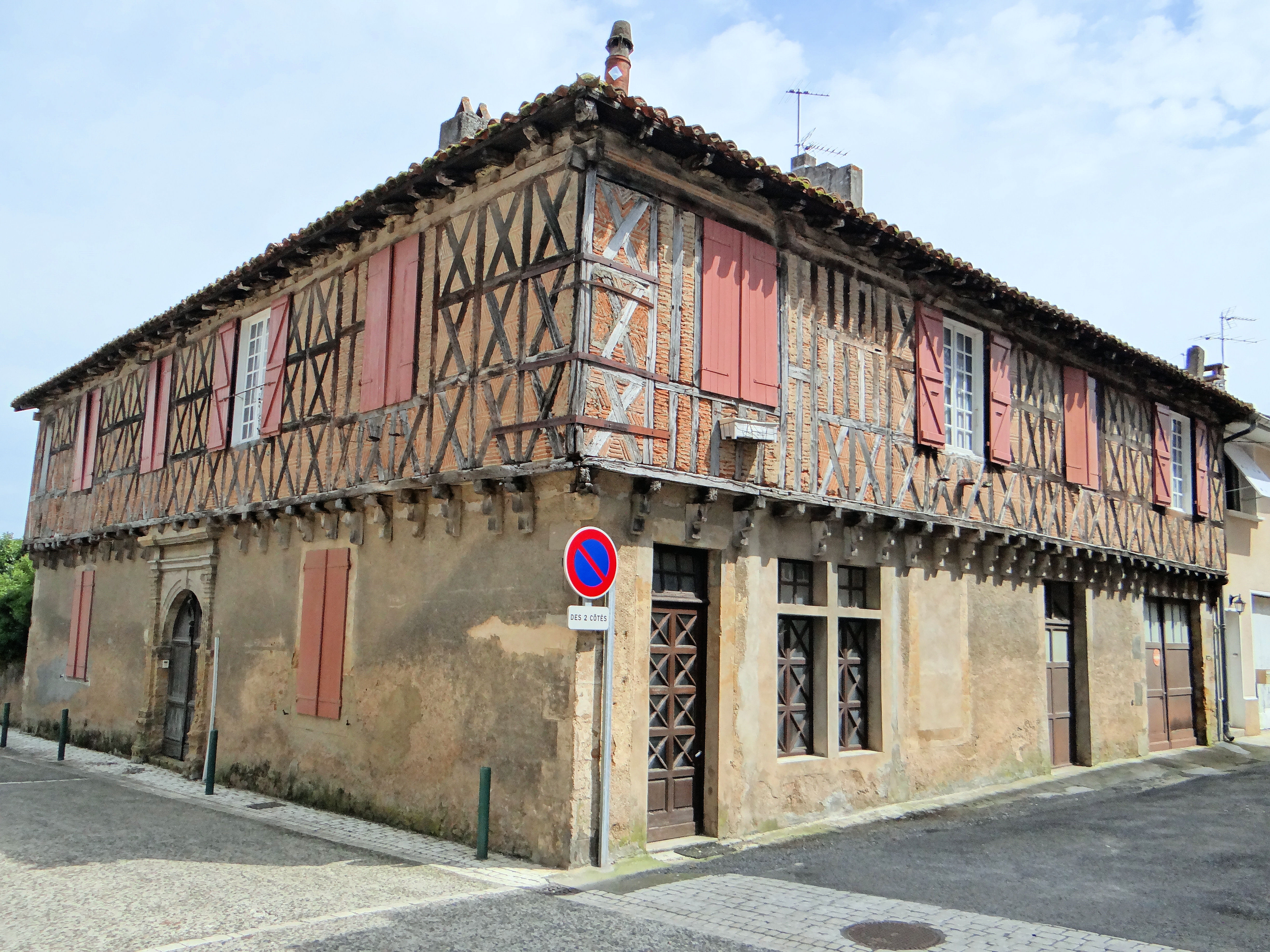
- A house in Masseube

- Coat of arms
- Location of Masseube
- Location within France Location within Occitanie
- Coordinates: 43°25′51″N 0°34′47″E
- Country: France
- Region: Occitania
- Department: Gers
- Arrondissement: Mirande
- Canton: Astarac-Gimone
- Intercommunality: Val de Gers

Government
  - Mayor (2020–2026): Roger Breil
- Area^{1}: 21.03 km^{2} (8.12 sq mi)
- Elevation: 200 m (660 ft)
- Highest elevation: 306 m (1,004 ft)
- Lowest elevation: 188 m (617 ft)
- Population (2023): 1,511
  - Density: 71.85/km^{2} (186.1/sq mi)
- Time zone: UTC+01:00 (CET)
  - Summer (DST): UTC+02:00 (CEST)
- INSEE/Postal code: 32242 /32140
- ^{1} French Land Register data, which excludes lakes, ponds, glaciers > 1 km^{2} (0.386 sq mi or 247 acres) and river estuaries.

Masseube (French pronunciation: [masœb]; Masseuva in Gascon) is a commune in the Gers department in the Occitanie region in southwestern France.

== Geography ==
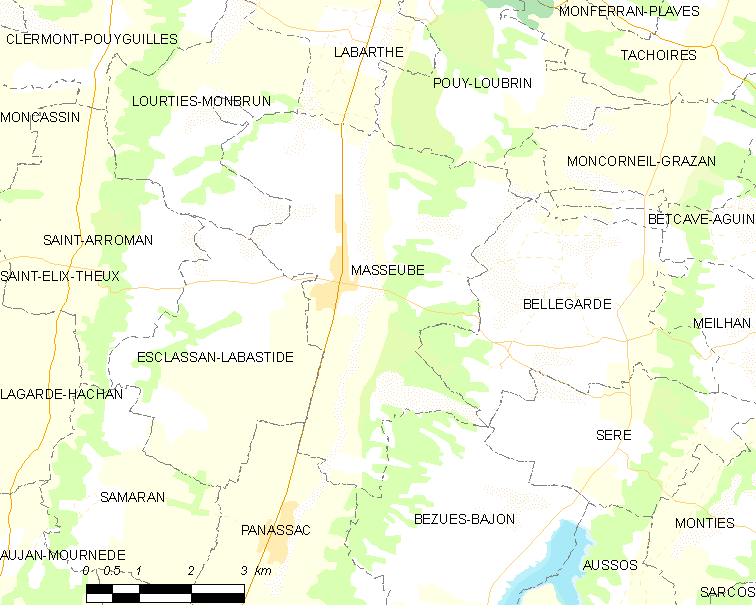
Masseube and its surrounding communes

== History ==
Masseube ("The farmhouse of the forest") was originally the name of a farm belonging to Escaladieu Abbey, in Bigorre. In 1274, the Abbey and Bernard IV of Astarac founded a bastide in Masseube. It got its customary laws 2 years later. The bastide still has its streets at right angles, an old house which is now the Mairie, and timbered houses.

During the Nazi occupation of Vichy France, there was a Jewish internment camp. Some of the Jews who were originally involuntarily transported to the Gurs internment camp were then transported to the internment camp in Masseube. There were around 250 Jews interned in the camp in 1940. There were no medical services, showers, or hot water provided to the Jews in the camp. There was also severe food rationing. In 1943 the Jews held in the region were moved again: 40 of them were murdered at Auschwitz, 20 died at a hospital in Auch and a further ten died while interned at the Masseube camp.

== Population ==
Historical population
| Year | Pop. | ±% p.a. |
|---|---|---|
| 1968 | 1,316 | — |
| 1975 | 1,309 | −0.08% |
| 1982 | 1,376 | +0.72% |
| 1990 | 1,453 | +0.68% |
| 1999 | 1,391 | −0.48% |
| 2007 | 1,573 | +1.55% |
| 2012 | 1,532 | −0.53% |
| 2017 | 1,520 | −0.16% |
| 2023 | 1,511 | −0.10% |
Source: INSEE

Its inhabitants are called Massylvains in French.

== Sites of interest ==
- Église Saint-Christophe, originally from the 13th Century c., was reconstructed in 1700; it was again rebuilt in 1883 when it was threatening to topple. The only conserved pieces are the lower part of the façade and the tower. The rest was reconstructed in the style of the 13th Century. In 1932–33, in honor of the 50th year after the renovation, Paul Noël Lasseran was called to paint murals. He finished a majority of them before his death in 1933.
- Rue Lagrange: This road is spanned by a cover which connects to buildings which were originally agricultural.

== Notable people ==
- Jean-Marie Ducos: Deputy of Gers and member of the First French Parliament from 1798 to 1799.

== Heraldry ==
The coat of arms was changed in 2009.

== See also ==
- Communes of the Gers department
