= Claude de Bourdeille, comte de Montrésor =

French aristocrat and Count of Montrésor

Claude de Bourdeille, comte de Montrésor (c. 1606–1663) was a French aristocrat and Count of Montrésor, who played a role in the intrigues of the first half of the 17th century, and was also a memoir-writer.

He left his Mémoires, published posthumously in 1663. The Eleventh Edition of the Encyclopædia Britannica notes in its entry on the Count of Montrésor that "His Mémoires have preserved his name from the oblivion otherwise awaiting such intriguers; they are written with naīve frankness and are extremely interesting."

== Biography ==
The Count of Montrésor was the grandnephew of Brantôme, the famous French writer. He became the second favorite of Gaston d'Orléans (younger brother of King Louis XIII) in 1635. Along with Gaston d'Orléans and the Count of Soissons, he planned the assassination of Richelieu at the camp of Amiens in 1636, a plan which eventually failed. In 1637, he had the Hôtel de Montrésor built in Paris by Michel Villedo and Claude Dublet.

The Count of Montrésor was forced to spend the next six years on his estate, but in 1642 he entered into the plot of Cinq-Mars against Richelieu. On the failure of the plot, he escaped to England, and his estates were confiscated.

Returning after Richelieu's death in 1643, he entered into the intrigues of the period just preceding the Fronde. He was exiled for his involvement in the cabale des Importants in 1643. He later returned from the safety of his exile in Holland to aid the duchesse de Chevreuse. He allied with the cardinal de Retz during the Fronde, and was eventually imprisoned in the Bastille, and then in Vincennes. Cardinal Mazarin attempted to win him over in vain, but in 1653 he made his submission to the victorious minister, and from that time on played no part in public life.

== Publication of his Mémoires ==
The Count of Montrésor's Mémoires were published posthumously in 1663. In subsequent years, they were occasionally reprinted in one and two volume editions, as noted by Louis Monmerqué in his 1826 biographical sketch of the Count of Montrésor. Since then, the Count of Montrésor's Mémoires have been reprinted in large collections spanning multiple volumes. The first such collection was by A. Petitot and Louis Monmerqué in the Collection des mémoires relatifs a l'histoire de France (Paris, 1819) and the second such collection was by Joseph François Michaud and Jean Joseph François Poujoulat in the Nouvelle collection des mémoires pour servir à l'histoire de France (Paris, 1836). The first editions of the Mémoires du Comte de Montrésor from 1663 can be found in the special collections of several libraries around the world.

- (in French) Claude de Bourdeille, Count of Montrésor (1663). Mémoires.
- (in French) Petitot, C. B., Petitot, A., Monmerqué, L.-J., & Delbare, F.-T. (1819). Collection complète des mémoires relatifs à l'histoire de France, depuis le règne de Philippe-Auguste, jusqu'au commencement du dix-septième siècle; avec des notices sur chaque auteur, et des observations sur chaque ouvrage. Paris: Foucault.
- (in French) Michaud, J. F., & Poujoulat, J. J. F. (1836). Nouvelle collection des mémoires pour servir à l'histoire de France, depuis le XIIIe siècle jusqu'à la fin du XVIIIe; précédés de notices pour caractériser chaque auteur des mémoires et son époque; suivi de l'analyse des documents historiques qui s'y rapportent. Paris: L'Éditeur du commentaire analytique du code civil.

== Other ==
Poe scholar Richard P. Benton has stated his belief that "Poe's protagonist [in the story "The Cask of Amontillado"] is an Englished version of the French Montrésor" and has argued forcefully that Poe's model for that protagonist was the Count of Montrésor. The protagonist was called Montresor in the story. The Count was first linked to "The Cask of Amontillado" by Poe scholar Burton R. Pollin.

== Online full-text resources ==
=== Biographical sketches ===
- Monmerqué, L.-J. N. [in French] (1826). "Notice sur Montrésor et sur ses mémoires". In Petitot, C. B.; Petitot, A.; Monmerqué, L.-J. N.; Delbare, F.-T. (eds.). Collection complète des mémoires relatifs à l'histoire de France, depuis le règne de Philippe-Auguste, jusqu'au commencement du dix-septième siècle. ser. 2 (in French). Vol. v. 54. Paris: Foucault. pp. 217–234. (Google Books)
- Aimé Champollion (1851). "Notice sur Montrésor et Fontrailles". In Jean-Joseph-François Poujoulat [in French]; Joseph Fr. Michaud (eds.). Nouvelle collection des mémoires pour servir à l'histoire de France depuis le XIIIe siècle jusqu'à la fin du XVIIIe : (Volume 25). ser. 3 (in French). Vol. v. 3. Lyon: Guyot. pp. 175–181. (Internet Archives)

=== Mémoires ===
- Claude de Bourdeille; Count of Montrésor (1851). "Mémoires du Comte de Montrésor". In Jean-Joseph-François Poujoulat [in French]; Joseph Fr. Michaud (eds.). Nouvelle collection des mémoires pour servir à l'histoire de France depuis le XIIIe siècle jusqu'à la fin du XVIIIe : (Volume 25). ser. 3 (in French). Vol. v. 3. Lyon: Guyot. pp. 183–241. (Internet Archives)
