= Sainte-Dode =

- Commune
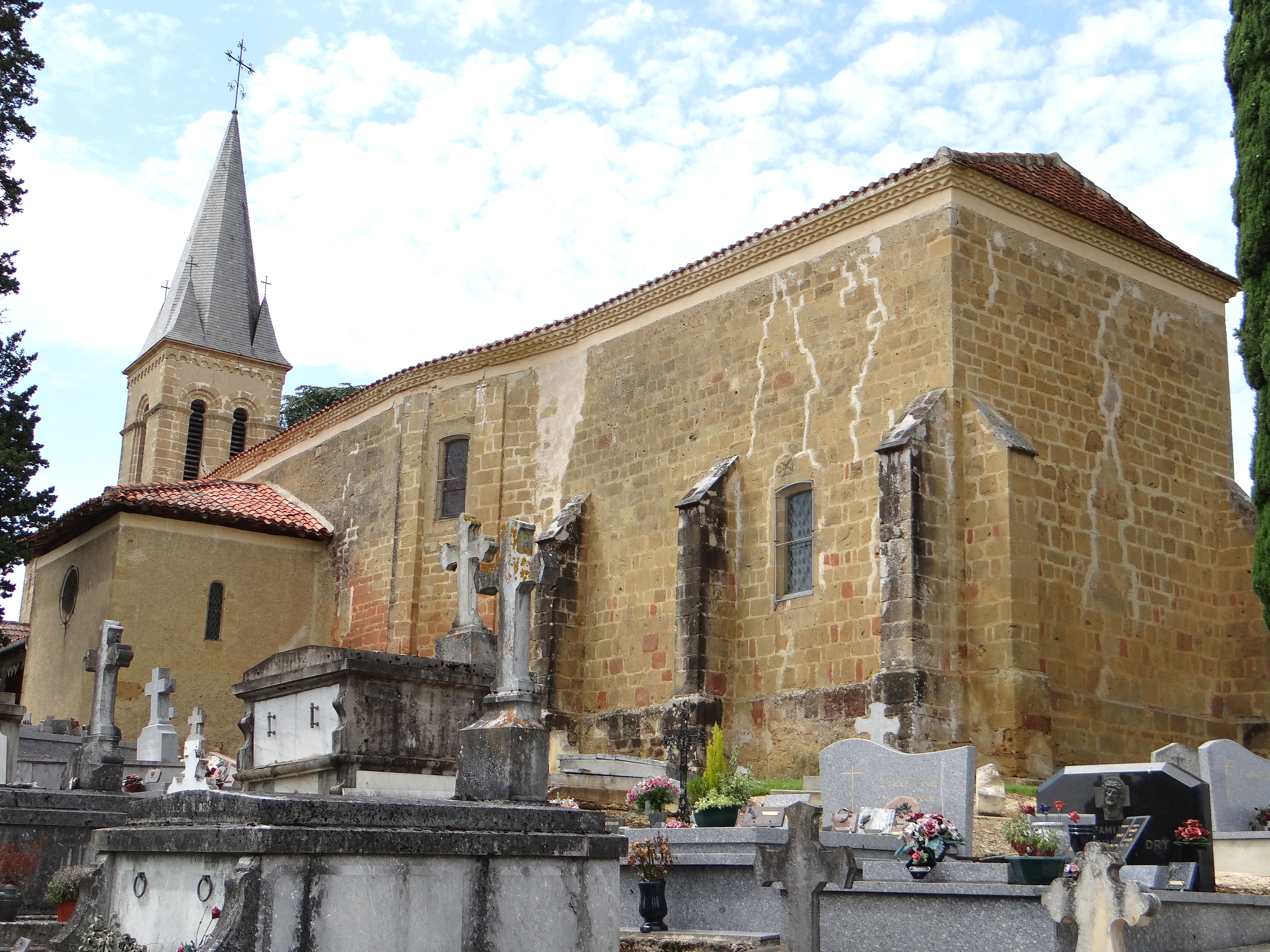
- The church in Sainte-Dode
- Location of Sainte-Dode
- Location within France Location within Occitanie
- Coordinates: 43°25′16″N 0°21′51″E
- Country: France
- Region: Occitania
- Department: Gers
- Arrondissement: Mirande
- Canton: Mirande-Astarac

Government
  - Mayor (2020–2026): Hervé Tujague
- Area^{1}: 18.84 km^{2} (7.27 sq mi)
- Elevation: 268 m (879 ft)
- Highest elevation: 340 m (1,120 ft)
- Lowest elevation: 179 m (587 ft)
- Population (2023): 230
  - Density: 12/km^{2} (32/sq mi)
- Time zone: UTC+01:00 (CET)
  - Summer (DST): UTC+02:00 (CEST)
- INSEE/Postal code: 32373 /32170
- ^{1} French Land Register data, which excludes lakes, ponds, glaciers > 1 km^{2} (0.386 sq mi or 247 acres) and river estuaries.

Sainte-Dode (French pronunciation: [sɛ̃t dɔd]; Gascon: Senta Dora) is a commune in the Gers department in southwestern France.

== Geography ==
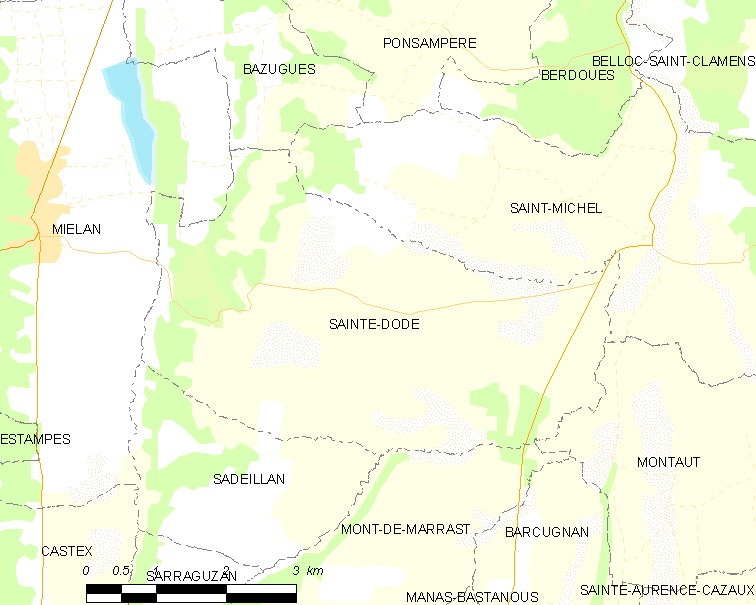
Sainte-Dode and its surrounding communes

== Population ==
Historical population
Year	Pop.	±% p.a.
1968	322	—
1975	285	−1.73%
1982	260	−1.30%
1990	264	+0.19%
1999	238	−1.15%
2007	225	−0.70%
2012	222	−0.27%
2017	209	−1.20%
2023	230	+1.61%
Source: INSEE

== See also ==
- Communes of the Gers department
