= Saramon =

- Commune
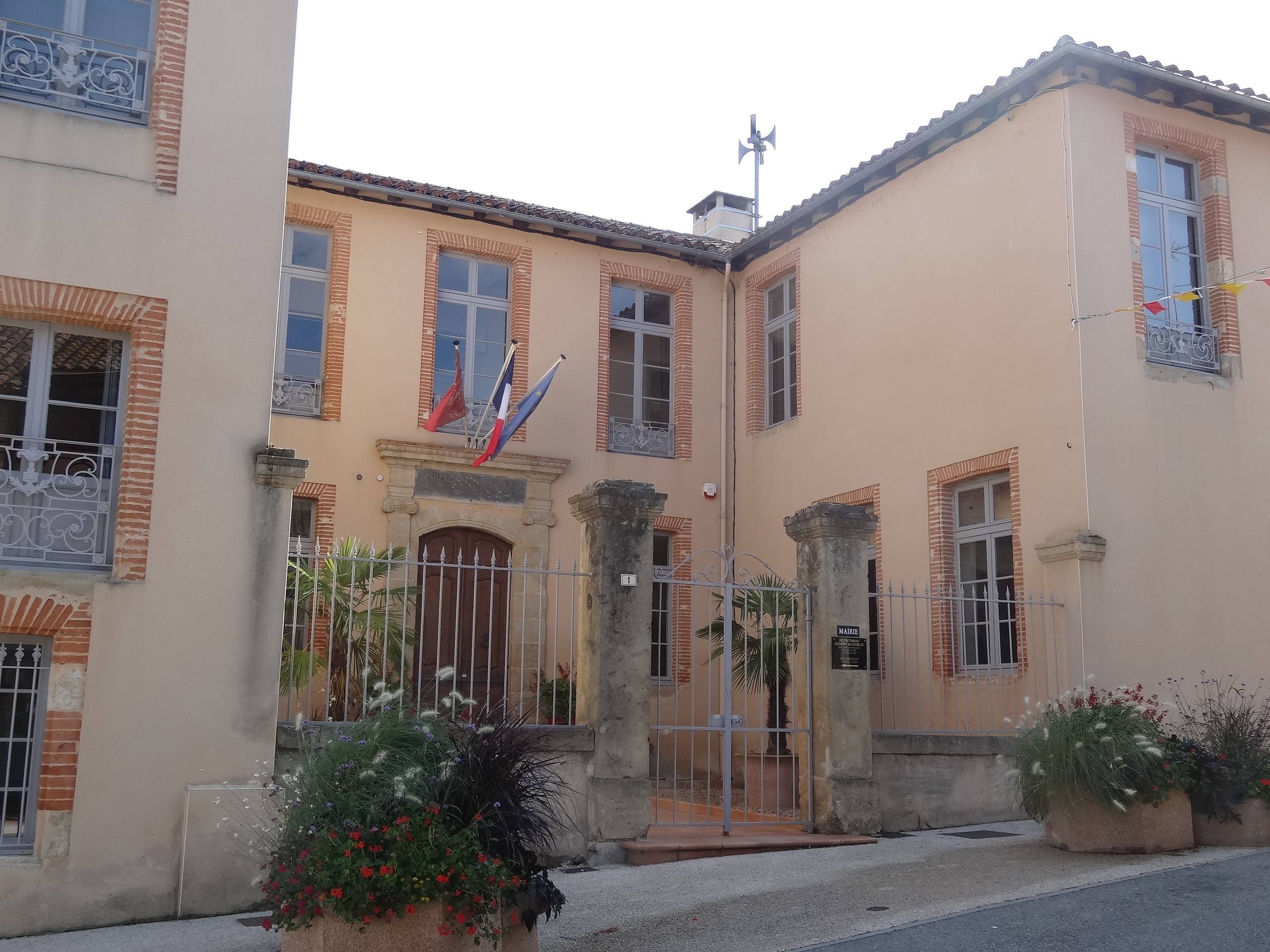
- The town hall in Saramon

- Coat of arms
- Location of Saramon
- Location within France Location within Occitanie
- Coordinates: 43°31′25″N 0°45′54″E
- Country: France
- Region: Occitania
- Department: Gers
- Arrondissement: Auch
- Canton: Astarac-Gimone

Government
  - Mayor (2020–2026): Éric Balducci
- Area^{1}: 13.03 km^{2} (5.03 sq mi)
- Elevation: 200 m (660 ft)
- Highest elevation: 266 m (873 ft)
- Lowest elevation: 166 m (545 ft)
- Population (2023): 864
  - Density: 66.3/km^{2} (172/sq mi)
- Time zone: UTC+01:00 (CET)
  - Summer (DST): UTC+02:00 (CEST)
- INSEE/Postal code: 32412 /32450
- ^{1} French Land Register data, which excludes lakes, ponds, glaciers > 1 km^{2} (0.386 sq mi or 247 acres) and river estuaries.

Saramon (French pronunciation: [saʁamɔ̃]) is a commune in the Gers department in southwestern France.

== Geography ==
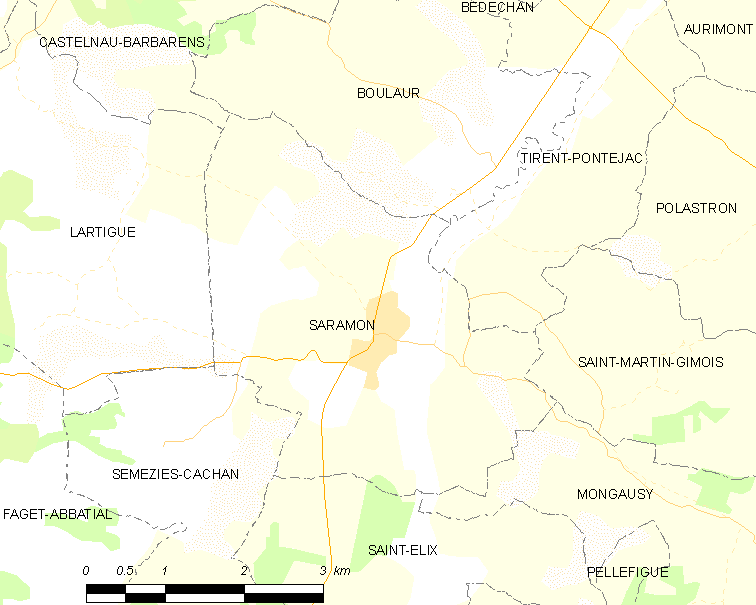
Saramon and its surrounding communes

== Population ==
Historical population
Year	Pop.	±% p.a.
1968	779	—
1975	759	−0.37%
1982	717	−0.81%
1990	661	−1.01%
1999	673	+0.20%
2007	770	+1.70%
2012	824	+1.36%
2017	825	+0.02%
2023	864	+0.77%
Source: INSEE

== See also ==
- Communes of the Gers department
