= Centule I of Astarac =

His known coat of arms.

Centule I (Occitan: Centolh d'Astaragues) (died 1230 or 1233) was the Count of Astarac from 1174 or 1175 until his death.

He is recorded in a sirventes of Bertran de Born as having joined the alliance against Richard the Lion-Hearted in 1183. Bertran calls him E.n Centols. Centule raised a company of Gascon routiers along with Gaston VI of Béarn and sent them north under one Brunus (or Brenus) to aid Adhemar V of Limoges in besieging a church on the Gorre in February. The company was routed by Richard.

Centule participated in the Reconquista in the Iberian Peninsula and was present at the great Battle of Las Navas de Tolosa in 1212.

== Sources ==
- Kastner, L. E. "Concerning Two Sirventes of Bertran de Born." Modern Philology, Vol. 29, No. 1. (Aug., 1931), pp. 1–9.

Preceded by Bernard II	Count of Astarac; 1174–1233	Succeeded by Bernard III
