= Berdoues =

- Commune
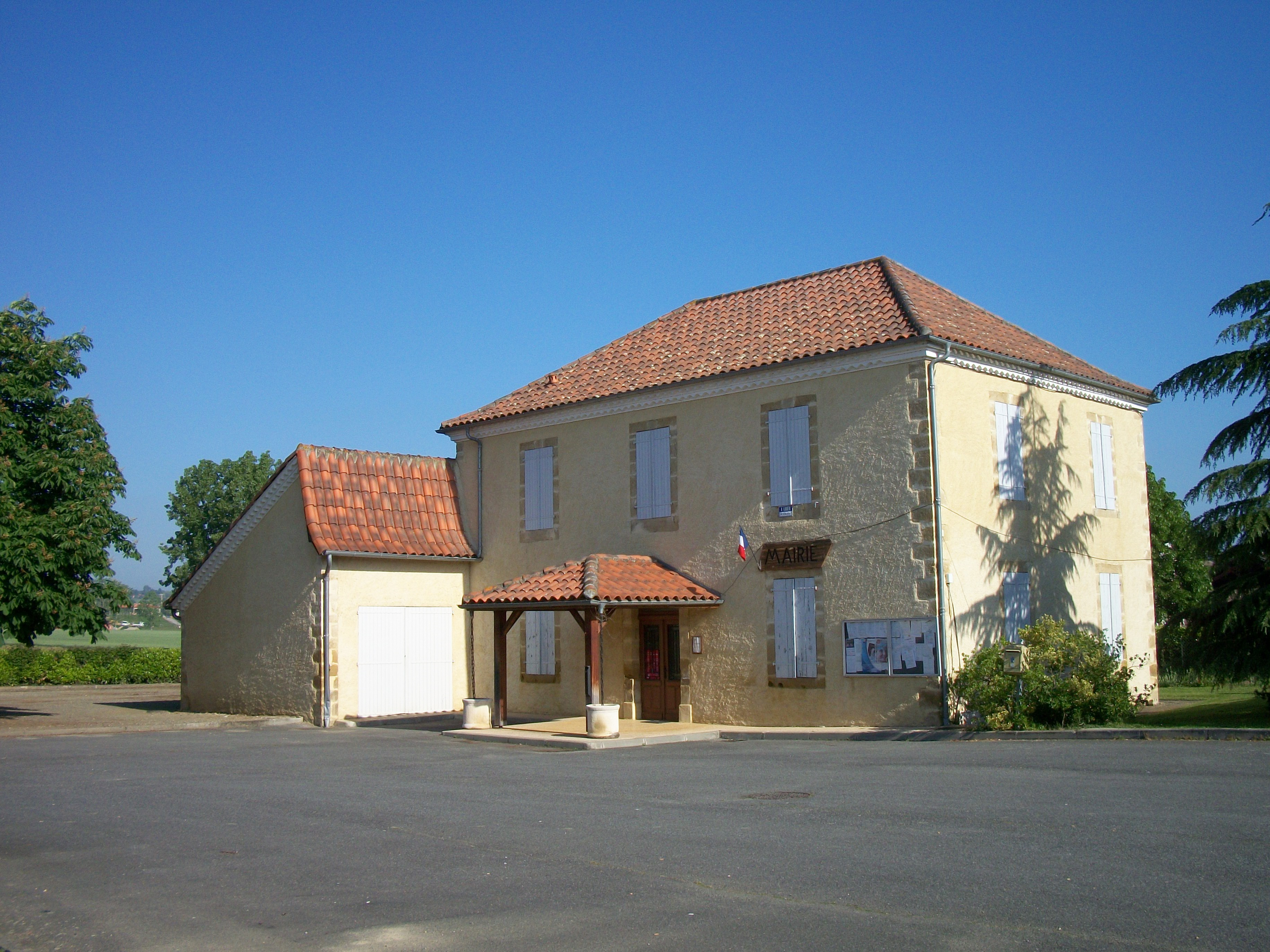
- The town hall
- Location of Berdoues
- Location within France Location within Occitanie
- Coordinates: 43°29′00″N 0°24′28″E
- Country: France
- Region: Occitania
- Department: Gers
- Arrondissement: Mirande
- Canton: Mirande-Astarac

Government
  - Mayor (2020–2026): Fabienne Saphore
- Area^{1}: 17.65 km^{2} (6.81 sq mi)
- Elevation: 162 m (531 ft)
- Highest elevation: 272 m (892 ft)
- Lowest elevation: 152 m (499 ft)
- Population (2023): 424
  - Density: 24.0/km^{2} (62.2/sq mi)
- Time zone: UTC+01:00 (CET)
  - Summer (DST): UTC+02:00 (CEST)
- INSEE/Postal code: 32045 /32300
- ^{1} French Land Register data, which excludes lakes, ponds, glaciers > 1 km^{2} (0.386 sq mi or 247 acres) and river estuaries.

Berdoues (French pronunciation: [bɛʁdu]; Occitan: Berdoas) is a commune in the Gers department in southwestern France.

== Geography ==
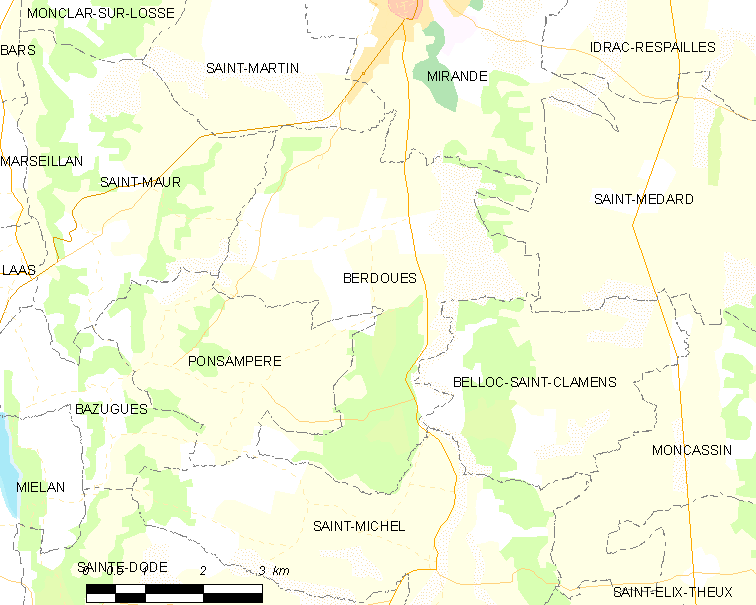
Berdoues and its surrounding communes

== Population ==
Historical population
Year	Pop.	±% p.a.
1968	356	—
1975	356	+0.00%
1982	342	−0.57%
1990	360	+0.64%
1999	352	−0.25%
2007	404	+1.74%
2012	473	+3.20%
2017	424	−2.16%
2023	424	+0.00%
Source: INSEE

== Economy ==
- Parfums Berdoues ([paʁ.fœ̃ bɛʁ.du]) is a French company created by Guillaume Berdoues in 1902. Berdoues is known for its violet fragrance Violettes de Toulouse.

== See also ==
- Communes of the Gers department
