= Mirande =

Place in Occitania, France

- Subprefecture and commune
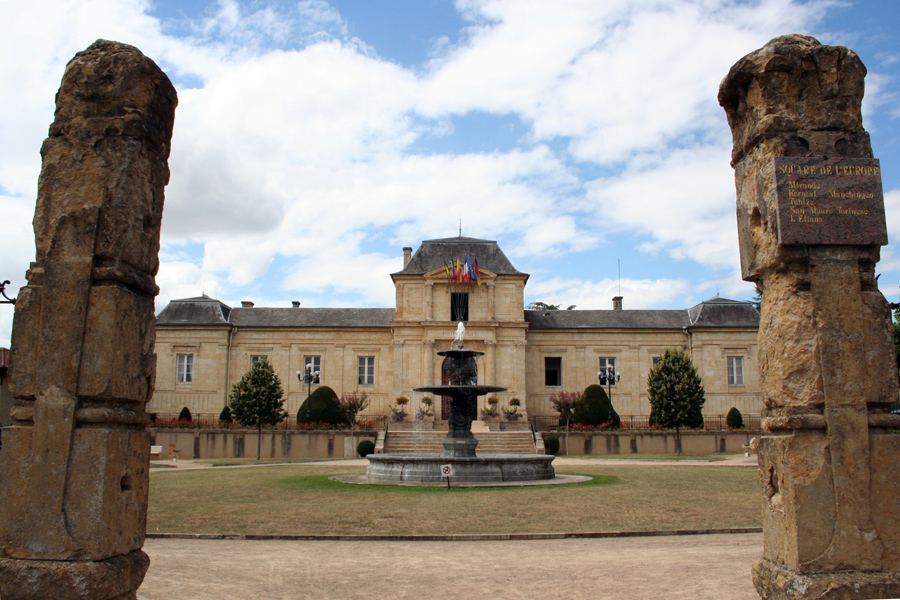
- Town hall

- Coat of arms
- Location of Mirande
- Location within France Location within Occitanie
- Coordinates: 43°31′N 0°24′E
- Country: France
- Region: Occitania
- Department: Gers
- Arrondissement: Mirande
- Canton: Mirande-Astarac
- Intercommunality: Cœur d'Astarac en Gascogne

Government
  - Mayor (2020–2026): Patrick Fanton
- Area^{1}: 23.42 km^{2} (9.04 sq mi)
- Elevation: 170 m (560 ft)
- Highest elevation: 268 m (879 ft)
- Lowest elevation: 139 m (456 ft)
- Population (2023): 3,457
  - Density: 147.6/km^{2} (382.3/sq mi)
- Time zone: UTC+01:00 (CET)
  - Summer (DST): UTC+02:00 (CEST)
- INSEE/Postal code: 32256 /32300
- ^{1} French Land Register data, which excludes lakes, ponds, glaciers > 1 km^{2} (0.386 sq mi or 247 acres) and river estuaries.

Mirande (French pronunciation: [miʁɑ̃d]; Gascon: Miranda) is a commune in the Gers department, Occitania, southwestern France.

== Geography ==
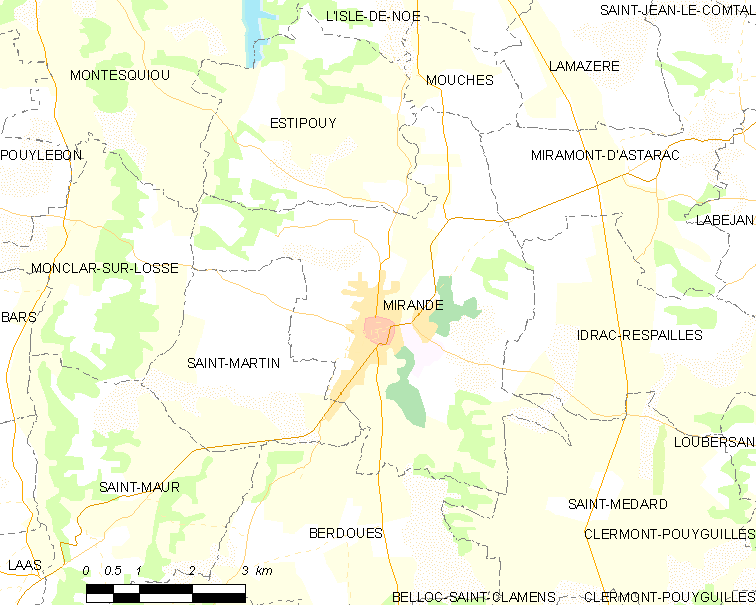
Mirande and its surrounding communes

== Population ==
Historical population

Year	Pop.	±% p.a.
1793	1,655	—
1800	1,558	−0.86%
1806	1,968	+3.97%
1821	2,128	+0.52%
1831	2,532	+1.75%
1841	3,409	+3.02%
1846	3,797	+2.18%
1851	3,454	−1.88%
1856	3,509	+0.32%
1861	3,304	−1.20%
1866	4,010	+3.95%
1872	3,885	−0.53%
1876	3,812	−0.47%
1881	3,748	−0.34%
1886	3,916	+0.88%
1891	4,244	+1.62%
1896	3,771	−2.34%
1901	3,867	+0.50%

Year	Pop.	±% p.a.
1906	3,642	−1.19%
1911	3,424	−1.23%
1921	2,559	−2.87%
1926	2,694	+1.03%
1931	2,761	+0.49%
1936	3,019	+1.80%
1946	3,592	+1.75%
1954	3,500	−0.32%
1962	3,610	+0.39%
1968	4,075	+2.04%
1975	3,879	−0.70%
1982	3,871	−0.03%
1990	3,565	−1.02%
1999	3,568	+0.01%
2007	3,740	+0.59%
2012	3,664	−0.41%
2017	3,468	−1.09%
2023	3,457	−0.05%

Source: EHESS and INSEE (1968-2023)

== Sites of interest ==
- Town Hall
- St. Mary's Cathedral
- Astarac Square
- Clock Tower
- Rohan Tower
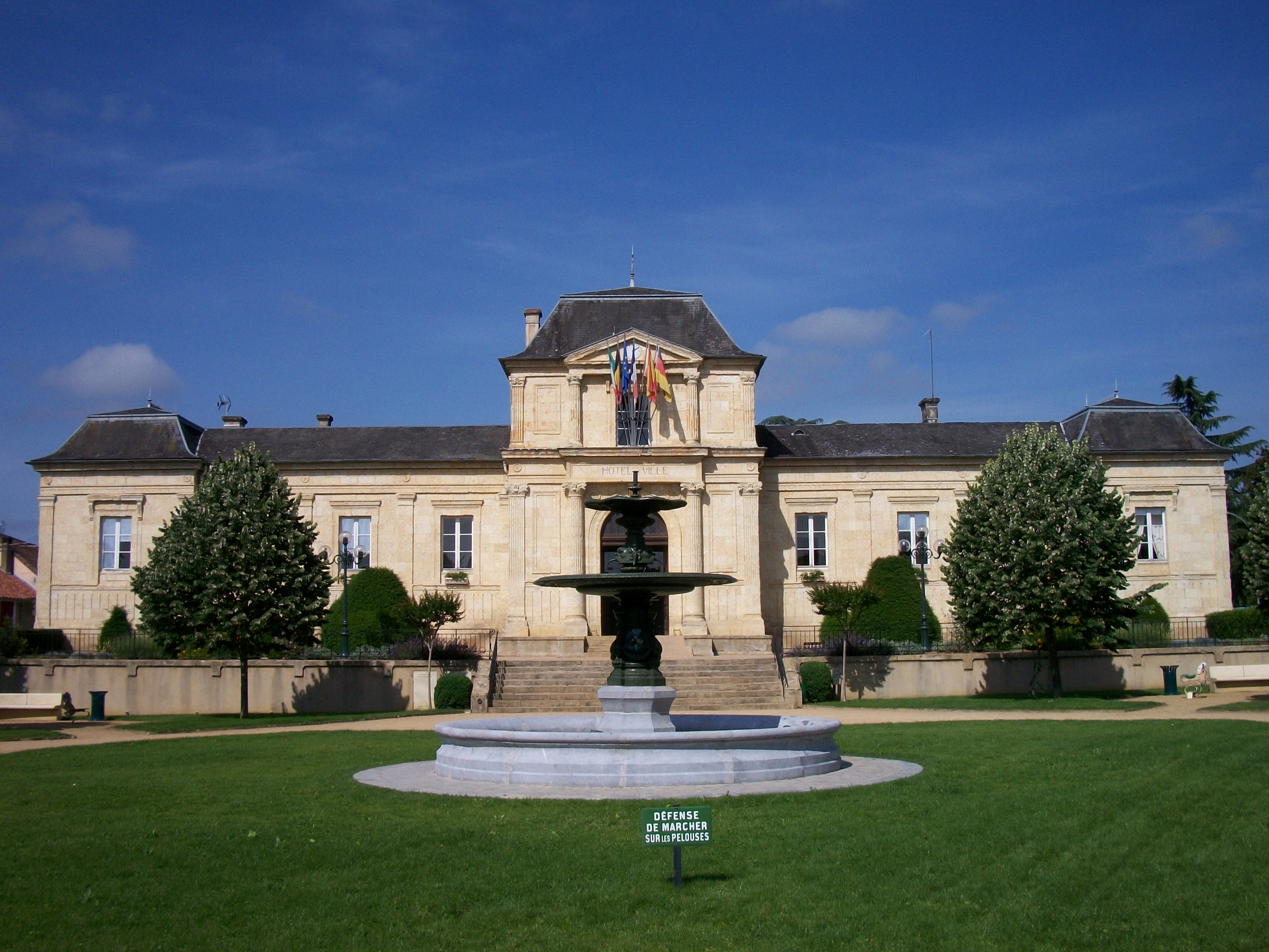
Town Hall

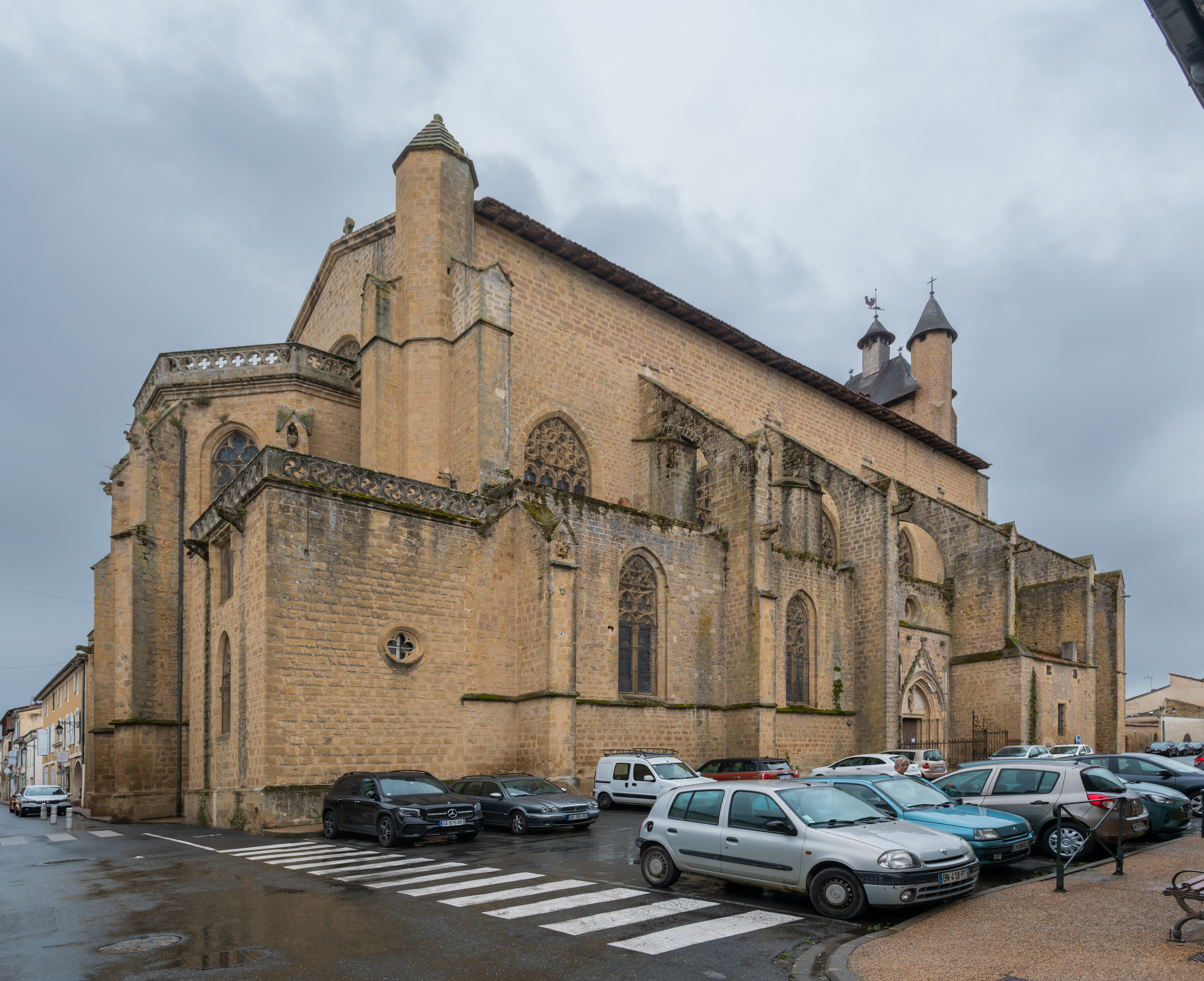
St Mary's Cathedral

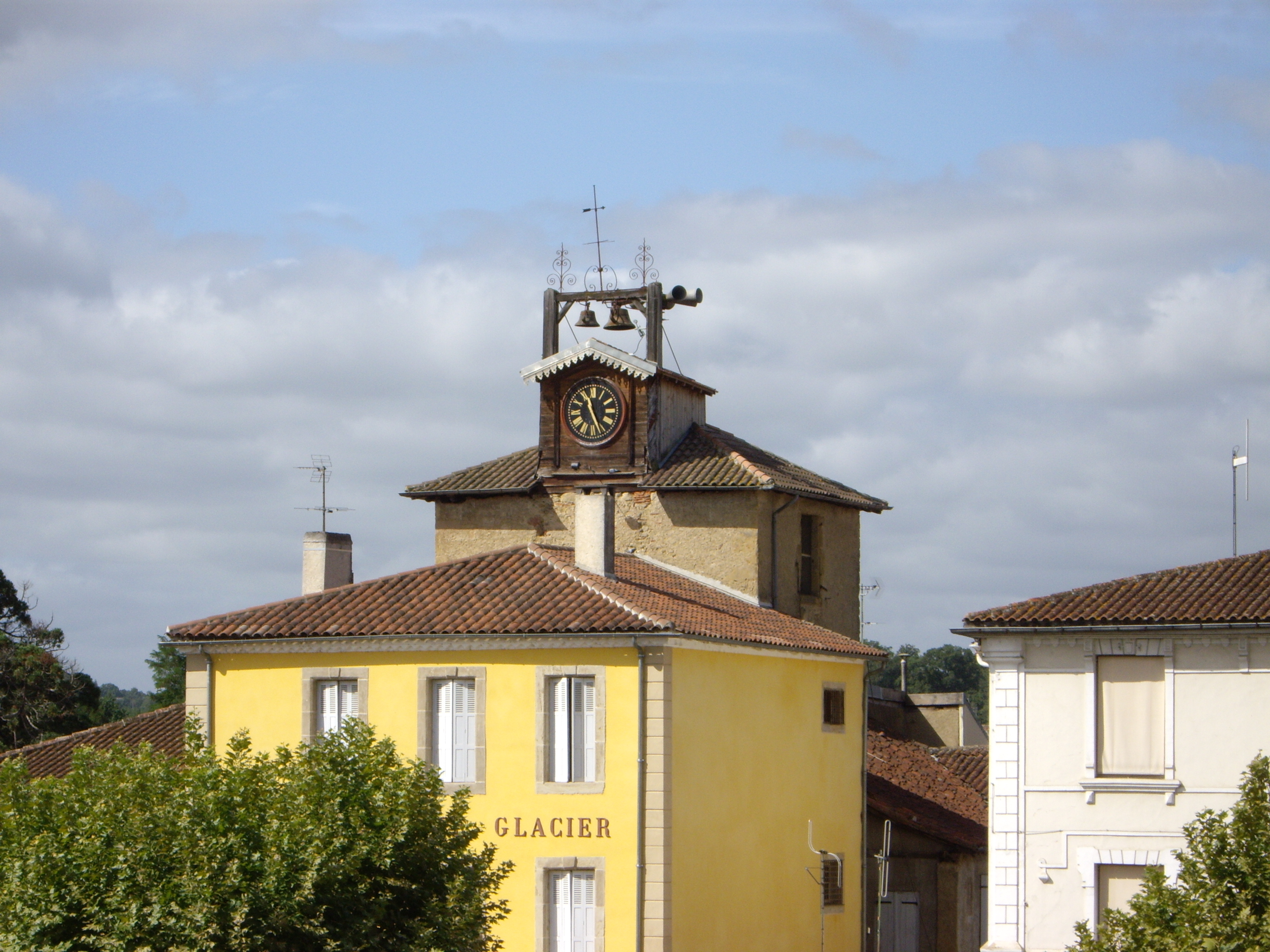
Clock Tower

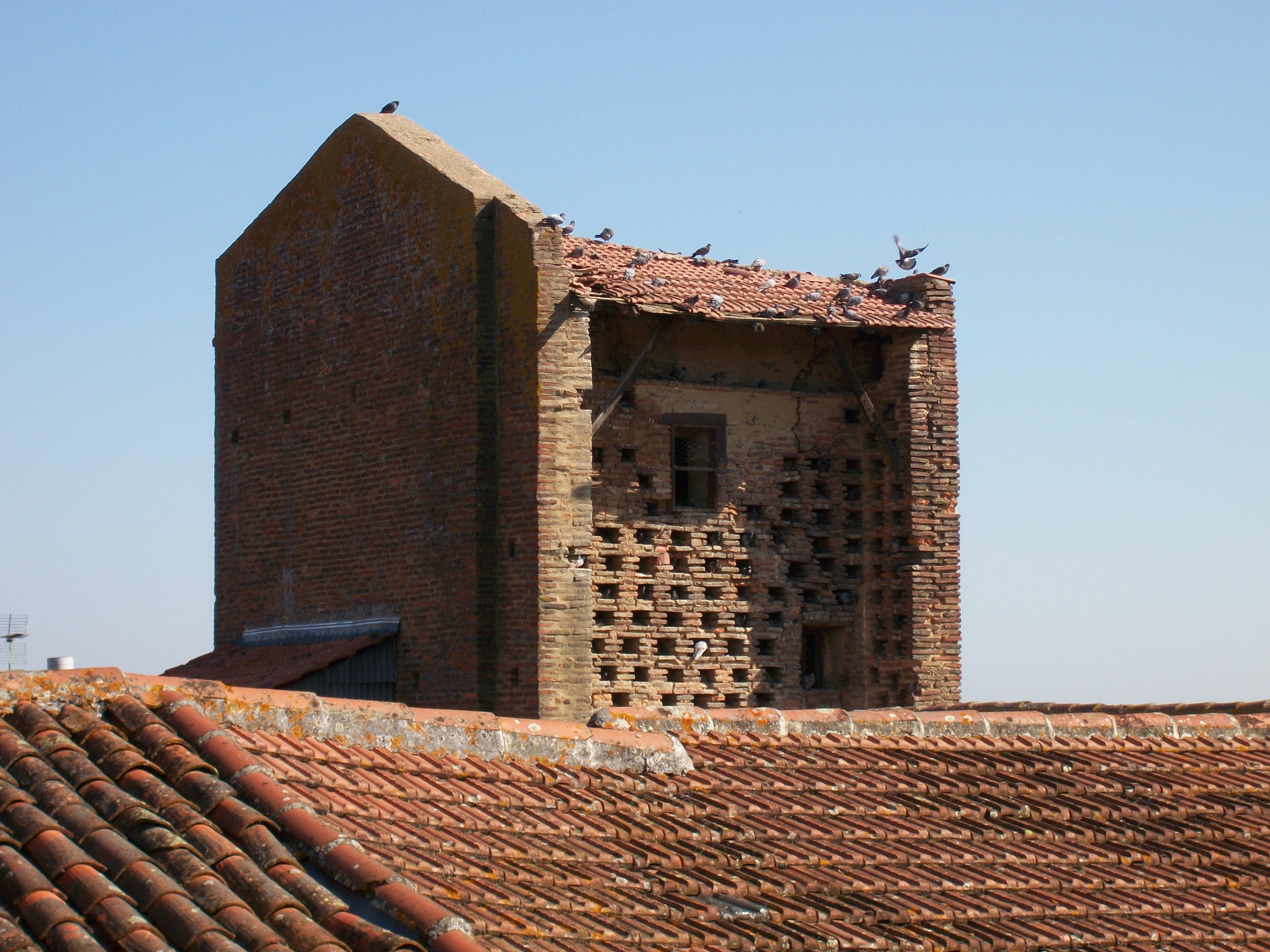
Rohan Tower

== Leisure activities ==
- Aquapark "Ludina"

== Events ==
- Country Music Festival
- Traditional markets

== See also ==
- Communes of the Gers department
