= Simorre =

French commune

- Commune
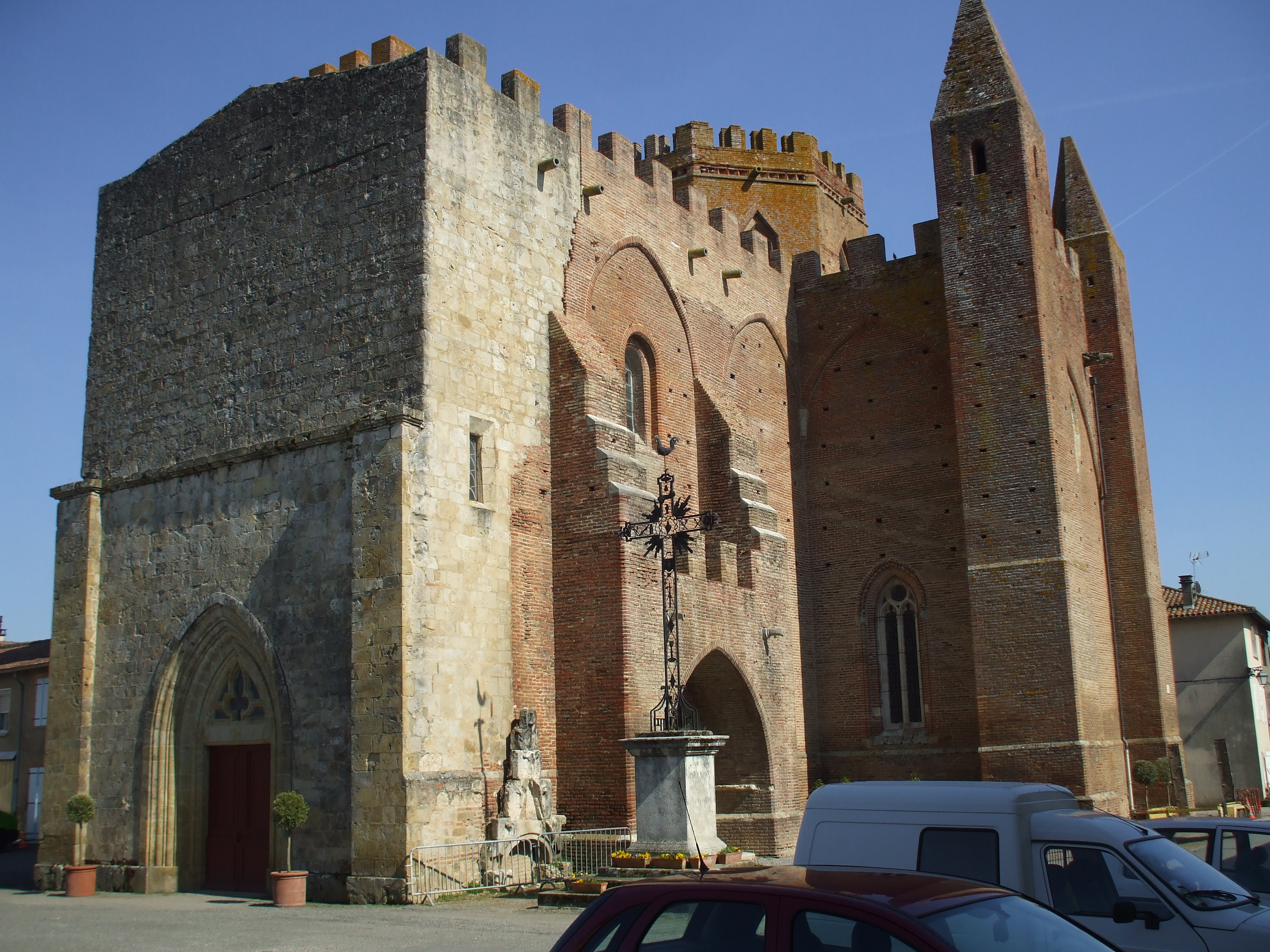
- The church in Simorre

- Coat of arms
- Location of Simorre
- Location within France Location within Occitanie
- Coordinates: 43°27′04″N 0°44′09″E
- Country: France
- Region: Occitania
- Department: Gers
- Arrondissement: Auch
- Canton: Val de Save

Government
  - Mayor (2020–2026): Éric Truffi
- Area^{1}: 35.85 km^{2} (13.84 sq mi)
- Elevation: 180 m (590 ft)
- Highest elevation: 321 m (1,053 ft)
- Lowest elevation: 182 m (597 ft)
- Population (2023): 688
  - Density: 19.2/km^{2} (49.7/sq mi)
- Time zone: UTC+01:00 (CET)
  - Summer (DST): UTC+02:00 (CEST)
- INSEE/Postal code: 32433 /32420
- ^{1} French Land Register data, which excludes lakes, ponds, glaciers > 1 km^{2} (0.386 sq mi or 247 acres) and river estuaries.

Simorre (French pronunciation: [simɔʁ]; Occitan: Cimòrra) is a commune in the Gers department in southwestern France.

== Geography ==
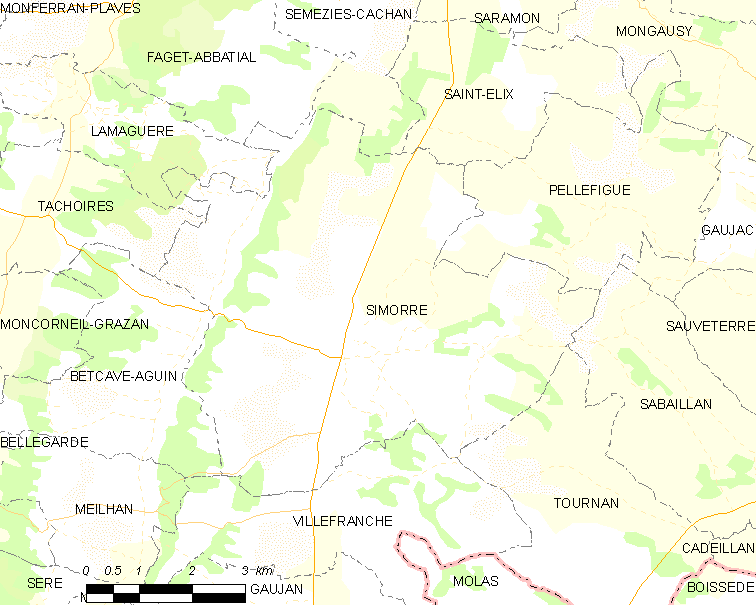
Simorre and its surrounding communes

== Population ==
Historical population
Year	Pop.	±% p.a.
1968	911	—
1975	806	−1.73%
1982	804	−0.04%
1990	708	−1.58%
1999	698	−0.16%
2007	660	−0.70%
2012	706	+1.36%
2017	710	+0.11%
2023	688	−0.52%
Source: INSEE

== See also ==
- Communes of the Gers department
