= Fontrailles =

Fontrailles Fontralha (Occitan)
- Commune
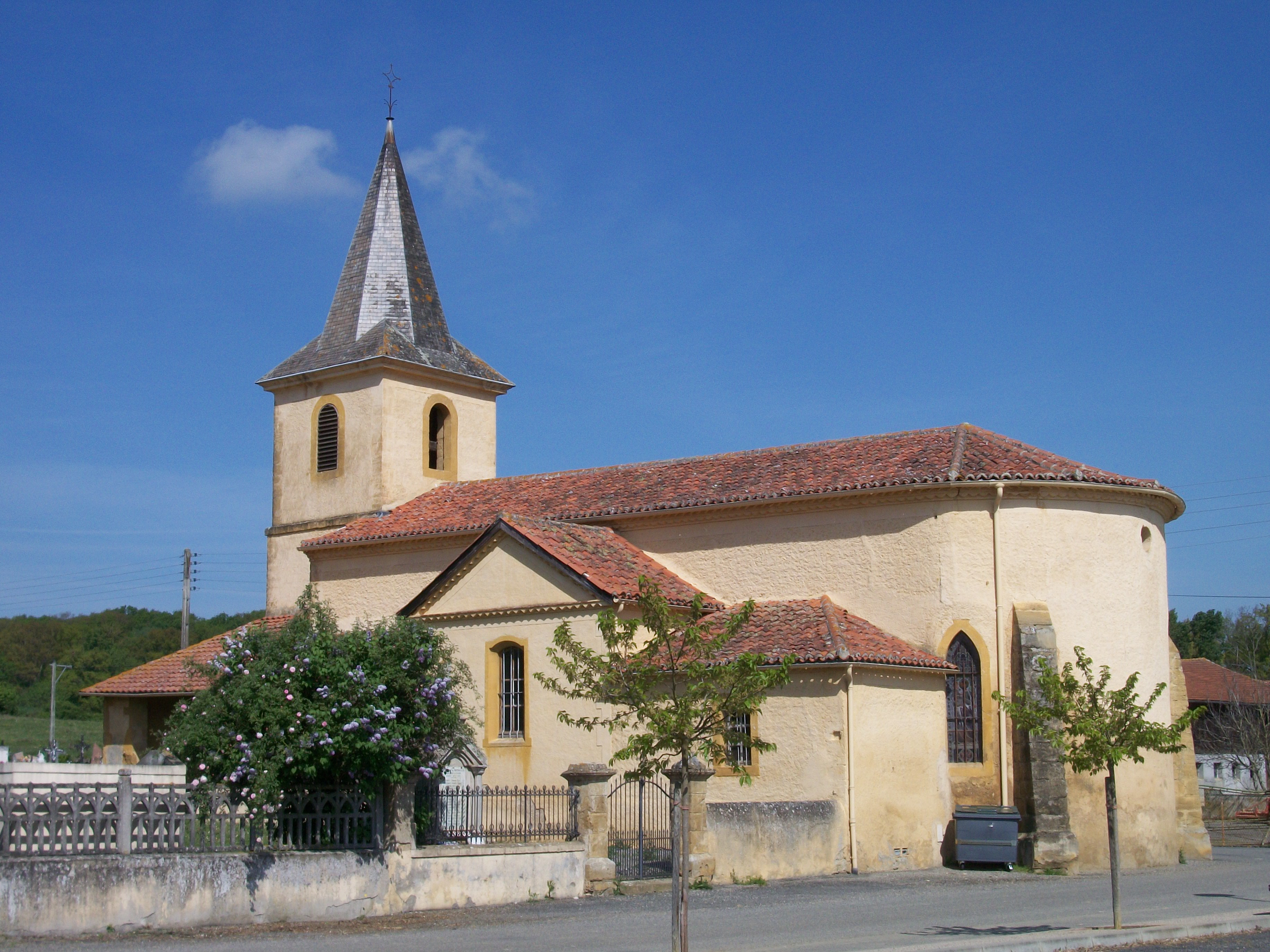
- The church of Fontrailles

- Coat of arms
- Location of Fontrailles
- Location within France Location within Occitanie
- Coordinates: 43°20′40″N 0°21′22″E
- Country: France
- Region: Occitania
- Department: Hautes-Pyrénées
- Arrondissement: Tarbes
- Canton: Les Coteaux
- Intercommunality: Pays de Trie et Magnoac

Government
  - Mayor (2020–2026): Christian Jolly
- Area^{1}: 8.99 km^{2} (3.47 sq mi)
- Elevation: 200 m (660 ft)
- Highest elevation: 378 m (1,240 ft)
- Lowest elevation: 211 m (692 ft)
- Population (2023): 168
  - Density: 18.7/km^{2} (48.4/sq mi)
- Time zone: UTC+01:00 (CET)
  - Summer (DST): UTC+02:00 (CEST)
- INSEE/Postal code: 65177 /65220
- ^{1} French Land Register data, which excludes lakes, ponds, glaciers > 1 km^{2} (0.386 sq mi or 247 acres) and river estuaries.

Fontrailles (French pronunciation: [fɔ̃tʁaj]; Occitan: Fontralha) is a commune in the Hautes-Pyrénées department in south-western France. The commune belongs to the canton of Les Coteaux and the arrondissement of Tarbes. The inhabitants are called Fontraillais and Fontraillaises. Its population was 158 in 2018. The area is 9.0 square kilometers.

== See also ==
- Communes of the Hautes-Pyrénées department
- Jouandassou B&B/Chambres d'hôtes in Fontrailles
