= Bendor Island =

French island in the Mediterranean Sea

Coordinates: 43°07′38.84″N 5°44′59.35″E

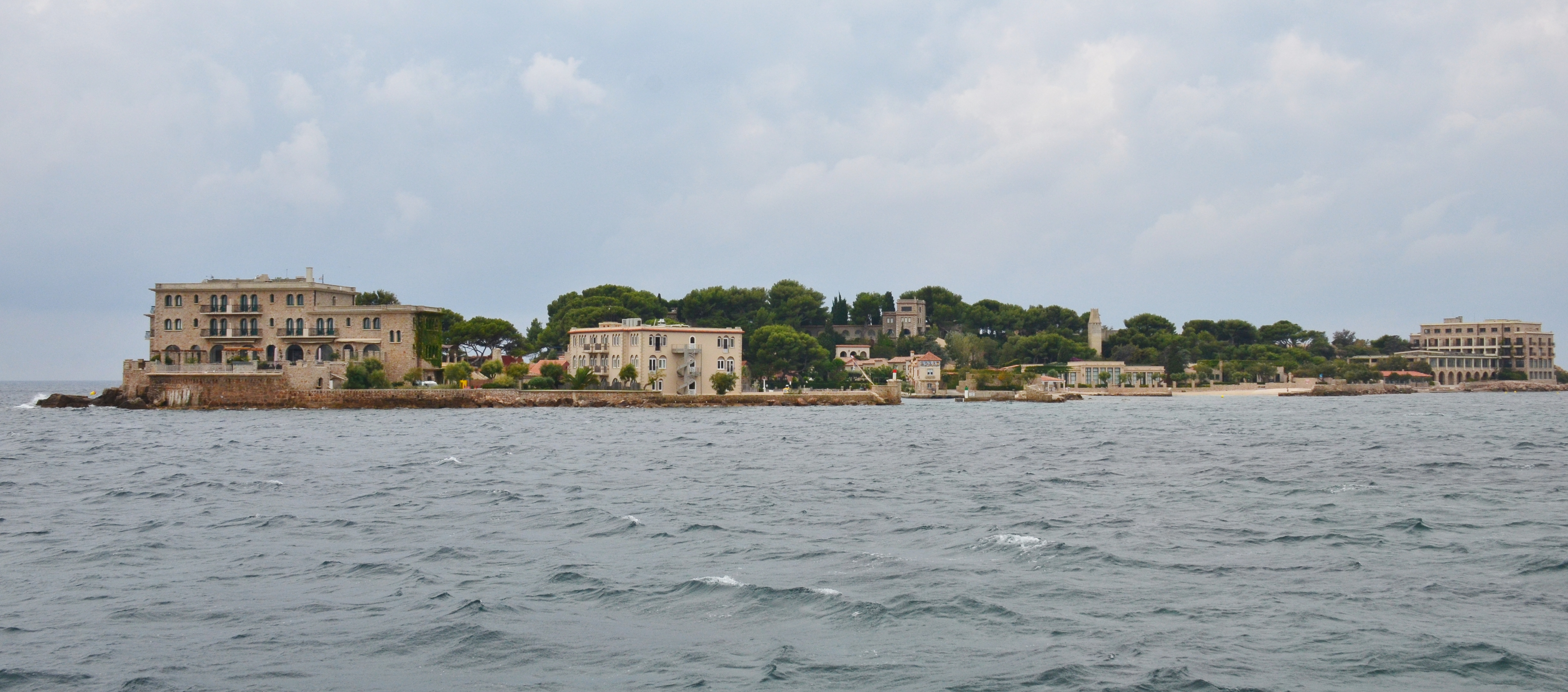

Bendor Island (Île de Bendor in French, pronounced [il də bendor]) is a French island in the Mediterranean Sea. It is located 300m off the coast from the commune of Bandol, in the Var department in the Provence-Alpes-Côte d'Azur region in south eastern France. It was bought and subsequently developed by the industrialist Paul Ricard in 1950. The island has a surface area of 0.08 km^{2}, with a coastline of 1.5 km. The island is 17m high at its highest point. A frequent daily ferry service runs to the island from Bandol.

== Facilities ==
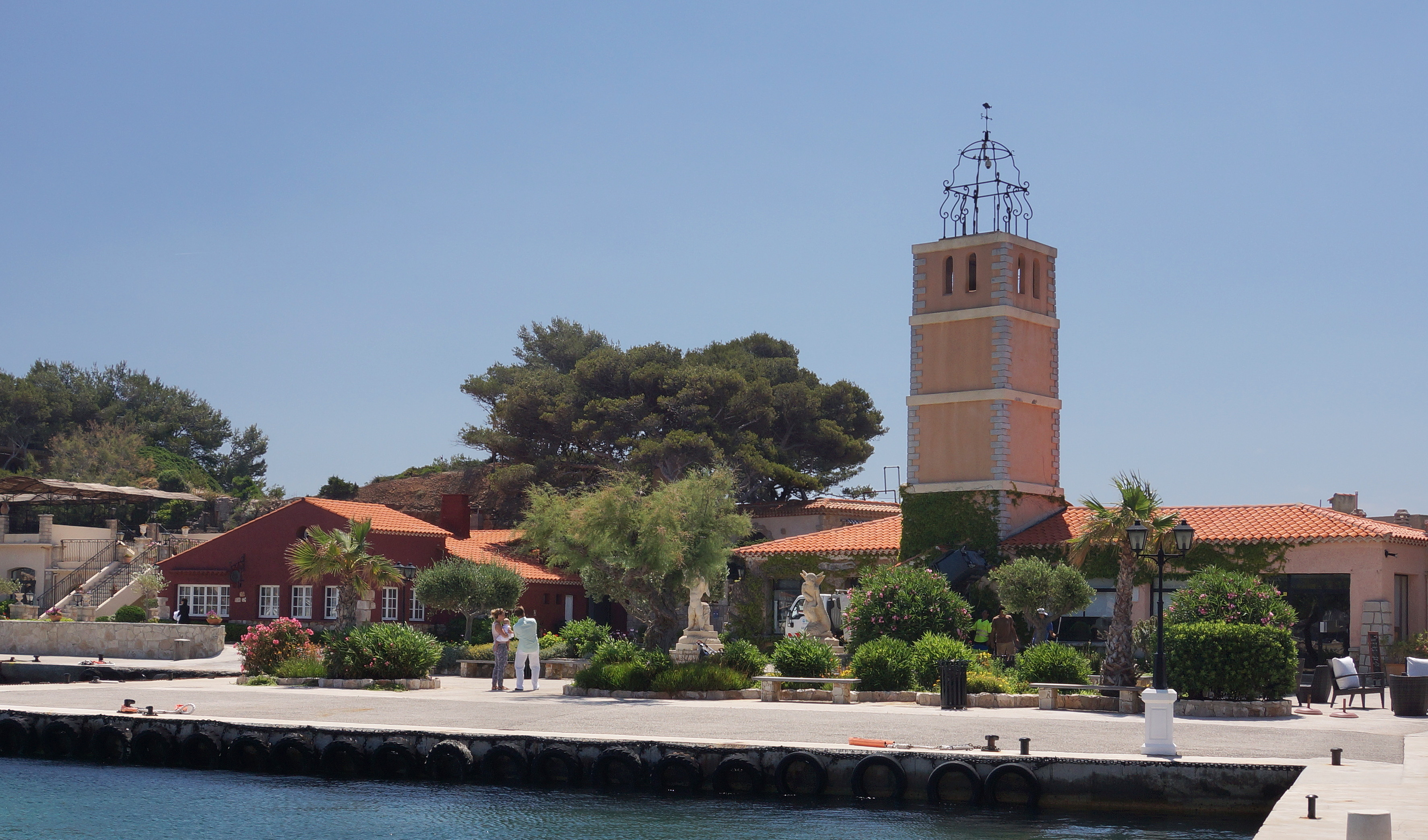
At the Bendor island

The island has a main hotel, the Hotel Delos, five restaurants, an artists village, boutiques, an art gallery and two museums: the Universal Exposition of Wines and Spirits (Exposition Universelle des Vins et Spiritueux, EUVS) and the Museum of Ricard Advertising Objects. Both museums were built by Ricard, admittance is free, but they are open during July and August only.

Sporting amenities include tennis courts, water sports facilities, a diving club and a marina. The marina is the smallest on the Côte d'Azur, with a surface area of just 2.8 km^{2}.

== History ==
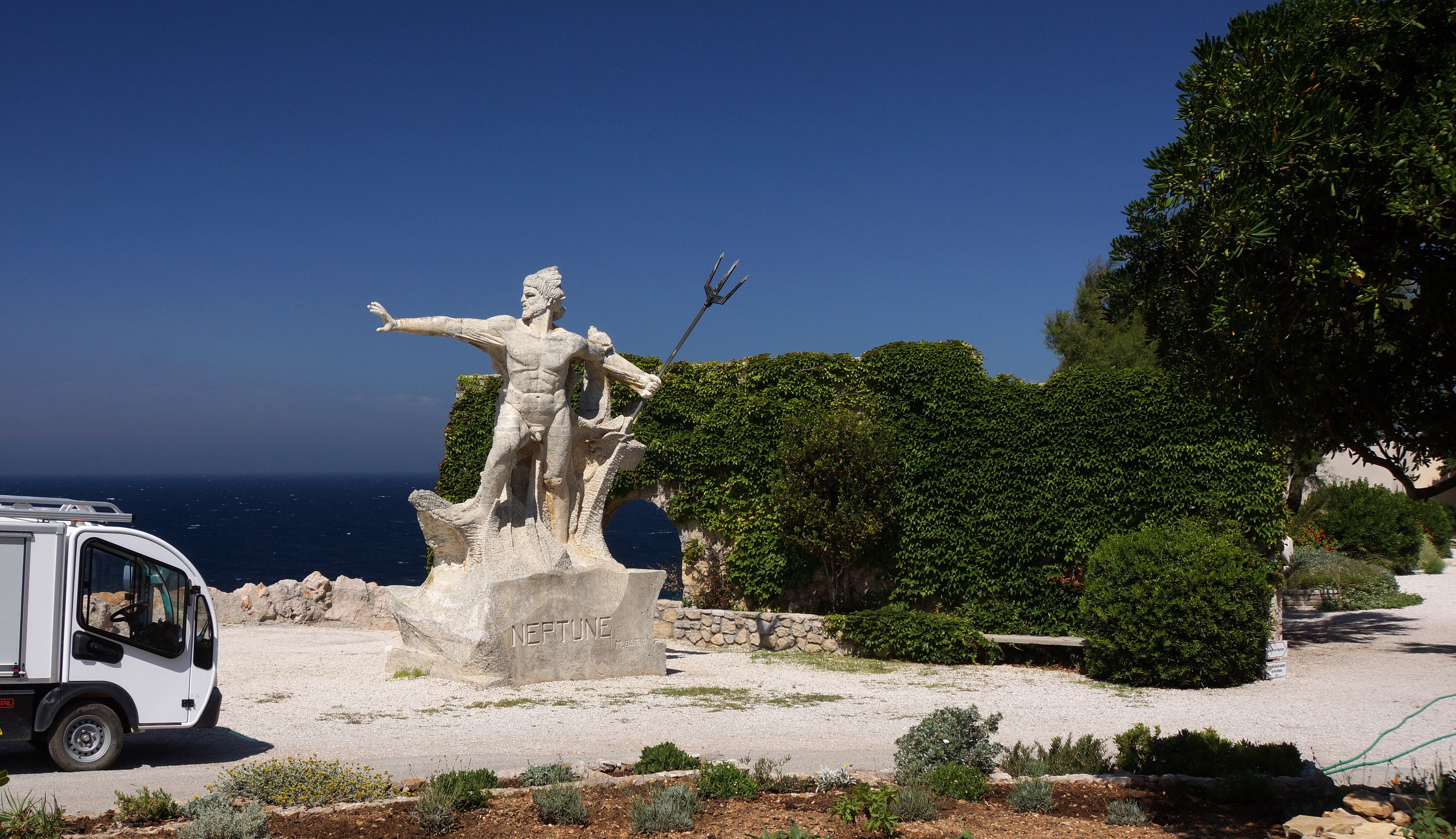
Neptune, Bendor island

In 1950 the island was bought by the industrialist Paul Ricard (1909–1997) the founder of Ricard, the pastis manufacturer. At the time of Ricard's purchase the sole inhabitant of the island was a sheep. Ricard also bought the Île des Embiez in 1958, located nearby off the coast of Six-Fours-les-Plages.

Under Ricard's patronage the island became a magnet for the jet set of the 1960s. Visitors to the island included Mireille Darc, Gilbert Bécaud, Salvador Dalí, Melina Mercouri, Marcel Pagnol, Annie Cordy, Fernandel.

A monolith built by Ricard dominates the marina. The monolith is inscribed with the phrase Nul bien sans peine ("No pain, no gain") which was Ricard's personal philosophy. Ricard built the monolith in tribute to Pierre Paul Puget, a Provençal sculptor, painter and architect of the 17th century. It was from Puget that Ricard took the motto.

== See also ==
- The island of Embiez, bought by Ricard in 1958
