= Garsenda =

Garsenda, Garsende, or Gersenda (French: Gersende, Latin: Garsendis) is a feminine given name, popular in the Middle Ages. It was the name of:

- Garsenda, Countess of Forcalquier, also countess of Provence
  - her mother, Garsenda of Forcalquier
  - her daughter, Garsenda of Provence, Viscountess of Béarn
- Garsenda of Toulouse
- Garsende of Béziers and Agde
- Gersende of Bigorre
