= Paul Ricard =

Industrialist, pioneer of pastis (1909–1997)

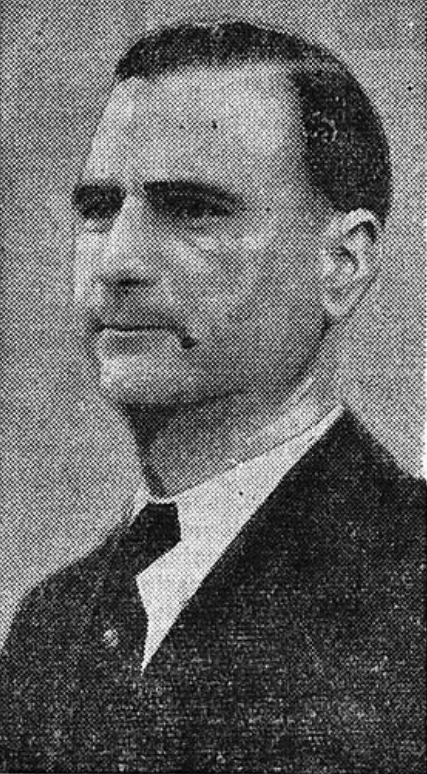
Paul Ricard in 1938

Paul Louis Marius Ricard (French pronunciation: [pɔl lwi maʁjys ʁikaʁ]; July 9, 1909 – November 7, 1997) was a French industrialist and creator of an eponymous pastis brand which merged in 1975 with its competitor Pernod to create Pernod Ricard. Ricard was also an environmentalist and the developer of two Mediterranean islands, as well as the builder of the Circuit Paul Ricard in Le Castellet.

== Early life ==
Ricard was born in Sainte-Marthe, part of the 14th arrondissement of the city of Marseille, to a family of wine merchants. Ricard married Marie-Therese Thiers in 1937, with whom he had two sons and three daughters.

== Pastis ==
After studying at the Lycée Thiers in Marseille, Ricard was discouraged from an early passion for painting by his father, who made him join the family wine business.

As a young man Ricard was introduced to the alcoholic beverage pastis by an old shepherd. Pastis, an anise flavored liqueur and apéritif, had been banned with other aniseed based spirits during the First World War, accused of undermining the French war effort. In a still in his bedroom Ricard experimented with creating a more refined version, using, among other things, star anise, fennel seeds, liquorice and Provençal herbs. Ricard's precise pastis recipe has never been disclosed and remains a secret.

Ricard was prepared for the lifting of the prohibition on milder forms of aniseed spirits in 1932, and quickly overtook established companies like Pernod. Absinthe, another aniseed drink, remained prohibited. Ricard sold his pastis as the "authentic pastis of Marseilles". Ricard's eponymous company was created in 1939. The previous year Ricard had sold more than 2.4 million liters of his pastis.

Pastis was banned again in the Second World War, banned as "contrary to the values" of Vichy France, the collaborationist regime. During the war Ricard retreated to the Camargue region, where he experimented with rice farming. Using his distiller skills he created an alcoholic substitute for petrol for the French Resistance using plums and cherries.

Ricard resumed business following the end of the war. In 1952 Charles Pasqua was hired as a travelling salesman and later rose to be marketing director for Ricard. Pasqua later twice became Minister of the Interior under Prime Ministers Jacques Chirac and Édouard Balladur.

A portion of the profits each year was converted into shares and distributed to the workers. In 1962 Ricard was floated on the French stock exchange, the Bourse. The flotation enriched many older employees of the company.

Protesting French government interference in his business, Ricard resigned from the daily running of his company in 1968. Following his resignation the business prospered under the stewardship of his son, Patrick. The company merged with their great rival, Pernod, in 1975, becoming known as Pernod Ricard. By the 1990s Ricard was the most widely sold French alcoholic drink; it was sold in 140 countries. At the time of Ricard's death Pernod Ricard was the third largest global spirits company.

=== Branding ===
A trained artist, Ricard deployed his artistic skills in the Ricard brand's blue and yellow design, inspired by the sky and the sun of his native Marseille.

Advertising of aniseed based drinks was made illegal in 1951; an exception to the advertising ban was the material sent to distributors, displays in drinking establishments and designs on delivery vans. In his autobiography Ricard wrote that ban turned out to be a "secret advantage which obliged us to exercise our imagination...".

Ricard designed a jug to hold ice and water for mixing with pastis in 1935; it helped promote the brand with French consumers. Ricard produced much more drinking ephemera featuring the Ricard brand including decanters, glasses, ashtrays, clocks and playing cards. The Ricard Museum of Advertising Objects was later founded by Ricard on the island of Bendor.

== Sport ==
Ricard recognised the effective use of sport sponsorship as a marketing tool for his pastis brand. Ricard was the first commercial sponsor of the Tour de France in 1948. Pickup-trucks on the Tour displayed the Ricard colours, and the company provided free music concerts along the route. In 1970 Ricard built the Circuit Paul Ricard, a race track near the village of Le Castellet in the department of Var in southern France. The circuit hosted 14 editions of the Formula One French Grand Prix between 1971 and 1990, as well as the Bol d'Or and the French motorcycle Grand Prix. After a ten-year absence from the calendar, the French Grand Prix returned at the Circuit Paul Ricard in 2018. The Le Castellet Airport was also built alongside the circuit.

== Later life ==
In 1950 Ricard was the producer of one of the first French colour films, La maison du printemps. He published an autobiography, La Passion de Créer in 1983.

Ricard purchased two islands in the Provence-Alpes-Côte d'Azur region of Var in the 1950s. The uninhabited island of Bendor near Bandol was bought by Ricard in 1950, and the Embiez island near Six-Fours-les-Plages was bought in 1958.

On Bendor Ricard established the Universal Exposition of Wines and Spirits in 1966, which aimed to create a "complete and permanent encyclopaedia of wine and spirits". Ricard also created the Museum of Ricard Advertising Objects on the island.

Appalled by "red mud" discharged into the Mediterranean Sea, Ricard campaigned against industrial pollution, and in 1966 founded the Observatoire de la Mer, which later became the Paul Ricard Oceanographic Institute. The institute is based on Embiez, it carries out research and raises public awareness of marine issues. An aquarium is open to visitors at the institute.

In retirement Ricard painted and acted as mayor of Signes from 1980 to 1988, a small town near the racing circuit that bears his name. Ricard died in Signes in 1997 at the age of 88. He was buried on Embiez; his grave faces the Mediterranean Sea.
