= Universal Exposition of Wines and Spirits =

Coordinates: 43°7′41.16″N 5°44′58.21″E

The Exposition Universelle des Vins et Spiritueux is a museum dedicated to alcoholic beverages on the island of Bendor. The island is in the Var department in the Provence-Alpes-Côte d'Azur in South Western France.

The museum is open in July and August, and admission is free of charge. It is closed on Wednesdays.

== Mission ==
The collections shows the evolution of brands and drinks throughout time and the cultural influence of wines and spirits. The museum was created to keep a “complete and permanent encyclopaedia of wine and spirits”. At the opening of the museum Ricard pledged that "This is not a simple event, it is permanent, eternal, and its expansion will never stop".

== History ==
The museum was opened on the 12 July 1958 by the owner of the Île de Bendor, industrialist Paul Ricard (1909-1997). Ricard was the eponymous founder of Ricard, a manufacturer of pastis. The museum has two directors, Anistatia Miller and Jared Brown.

In 2007 the museum underwent conservation, carried out by a team of experts and volunteers. The conservation process discovered more than 5000 wine and spirit labels and more than 1000 menus and drinks lists dating back to 1860. The 2007 conservation also discovered dissertations on viniculture and distillation, which had been presented at the EUVS during the 1960s. The papers had been presented before modern technological advancements in spirit production.

The museum possesses a collection of 8,000 bottles of wines and spirits from around the world. The museum also includes a collection of alcoholic ephemera dating from the 1860s including glassware, crystal, labels, restaurant menus and wine lists. The museum is also the site for conferences on wines and spirits.

The EUVS hosts a freely accessible online library with a database of rare bottles and searchable library of vintage menus, drinks lists, distillation books, and cocktail books.

== Art ==
The entrance to the museum is guarded by statues of Bacchus and Vigne, which were carved by the Provençale artist Louis Botinelly. The exterior ceramics were executed by Mirielle Ginard and Henri Couve. Frescos inside the museum depicting the history of the wines and spirits were created by artists and art students.

George Potier painted “The Secret of Making Anise” and also created the initial logo for the museum. “The Warriors’ Wine" was executed by the Milanese artist Gianni Bursamolino. With Ricard, Bursamolino launched a competition that invited art students to create the other frescos in the museum.
