= Marina Lévy =

French oceanographer

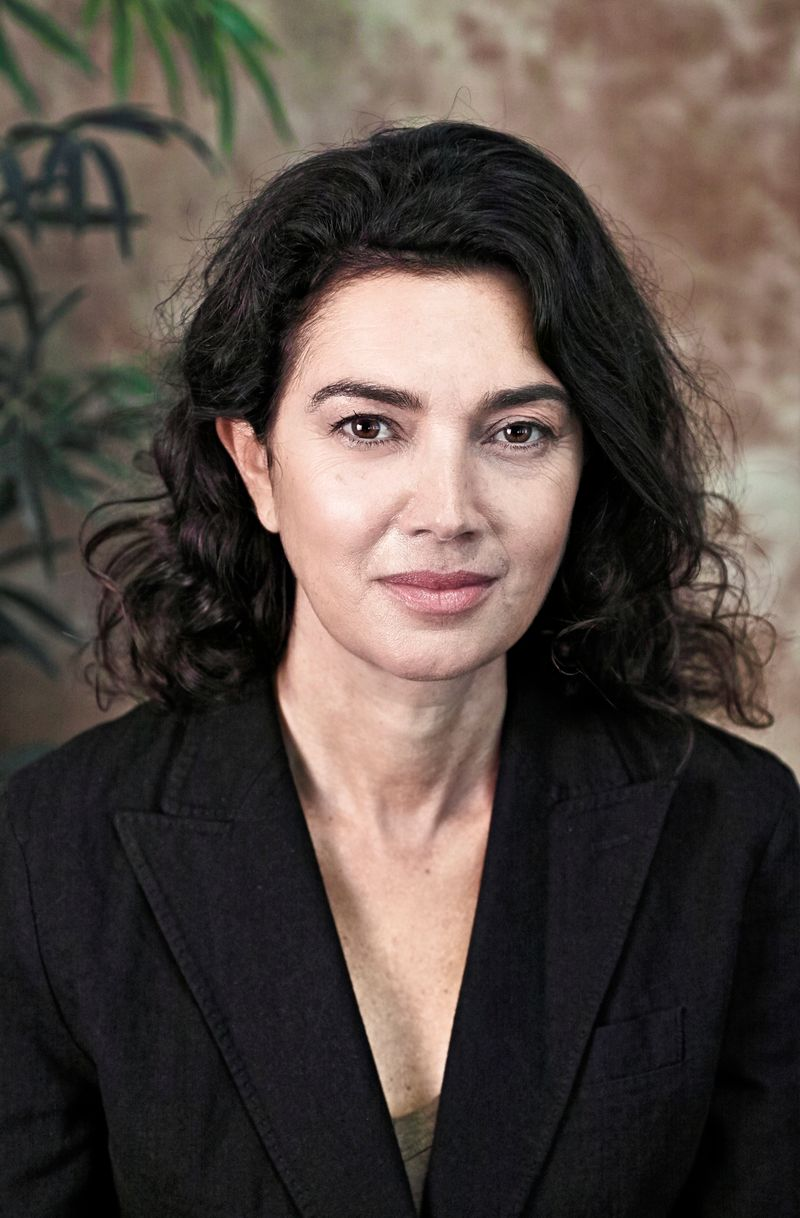
Marina Lévy in 2020.

Marina Lévy is a French oceanographer. She is Director of Research at CNRS.

Her research focuses on the interactions between ocean physics and biogeochemistry, in relation to climate and biodiversity.

== Education and early career ==
In 1989, she was admitted to the École Polytechnique, where she specialized in physics. She earned her PhD in oceanography, meteorology, and environmental sciences from Sorbonne University in 1996, with a dissertation entitled Modelling Biogeochemical Processes in the Northwestern Mediterranean: Seasonal Cycle and Mesoscale Variability.

She then earned a postdoctoral fellowship at Columbia University's Lamont-Doherty Earth Observatory in the United States, before her admission at the French National Centre for Scientific Research (CNRS) in 1998. In 2006, she received her Habilitation à diriger des recherches (accreditation to supervise research) from Sorbonne University, with a review dissertation entitled The Modulation of Biological Production by Mesoscale Ocean Turbulence.

== Career and scientific contributions ==
Since 1999, Marina Lévy has been a researcher at the Laboratory of Oceanography and Climate: Experimentation and Numerical Approaches (LOCEAN) within the Pierre-Simon Laplace Institute for Climate Science (IPSL), where she currently holds the position of senior research director. She teaches marine biogeochemistry at École Normale Supérieure (ENS) and École Polytechnique.

Lévy specializes in the study of ocean turbulence and its effects on marine ecosystems and the climate system. Her work has highlighted how small ocean eddies influence biological productivity and contribute to the regulation of the global carbon cycle.

Her research interests include the ocean's role in the climate system, mesoscale and sub-mesoscale turbulence, marine ecosystems, plankton biodiversity, the biogeochemical cycles of carbon, nitrogen, and oxygen, ocean remote sensing, digital twins of the ocean, the integration of artificial intelligence in oceanography, and Earth system modeling.

During her PhD, she developed the initial components for incorporating marine biogeochemistry into the NEMO ocean model. These foundational elements have since contributed to the development of the European Digital Twin of the Ocean. Between 2005 and 2010, she participated in the creation of the first high-resolution numerical simulations of the ocean, utilizing the Earth Simulator supercomputer in Yokohama, Japan—then one of the most powerful in the world. These pioneering simulations advanced research on the role of ocean turbulence at meso- and submesoscales, a critical and still largely unresolved aspect of climate science.

From 2005 to 2018, Lévy also carried out scientific collaborations in India, particularly at the National Institute of Oceanography in Goa, where she spent several research stays. She maintains regular collaborations with international institutions, including the Massachusetts Institute of Technology (MIT) and New York University (NYU).

Between 2013 and 2024, she served as Associate Editor for the American Geophysical Union’s journal Global Biogeochemical Cycles.

In 2019, she was part of the French delegation involved in the negotiations for the Intergovernmental Panel on Climate Change (IPCC) Special Report on the Ocean and Cryosphere.

Lévy has supervised 14 PhD theses at Sorbonne University, including those of Laure Resplandy and Pierre Karleskind, and has co-supervised several others in India, Senegal, and the United States.

She is part of Paul Ricard Oceanography Institute board of directors.

She is also actively engaged in mentoring women scientists.

From March 15, 2024 to December 2025, she is the ocean advisor to the President of Institut de recherche pour le développement (France).

In 2026, she become the Director of the Institut de l’Océan at Alliance Sorbonne Université, Paris.

== Science communication ==
Marina Lévy regularly participates in a wide range of outreach initiatives, including interviews on radio, television, and in the press, as well as lectures and conferences for academic audiences, private companies, and the general public. She has authored several articles aimed at a general audience.

== Awards and recognition ==
- 1998: Lamont Doherty Earth Observatory post-doc fellow
- 2004: CNRS Bronze Medal for her contributions to oceanography
- 2010: Houghton Lecturer at the Massachusetts Institute of Technology (MIT)
