= List of shipwrecks in March 1889 =

The list of shipwrecks in March 1889 includes ships sunk, foundered, grounded, or otherwise lost during March 1889.

== 1 March ==
List of shipwrecks: 1 March 1889
Ship	State	Description
John Coggin	United Kingdom	The brig foundered in the North Sea. Her crew were rescued by the tug Teazer (United Kingdom).
Nelly	United Kingdom	The ship was lost at "La Riale". Her crew were rescued.
102	French Navy	The 35-metre (115 ft)-type torpedo boat suddenly capsized and foundered during manoeuvres off Île des Embiez, near Toulon, Var. Six of her crew were killed. She was later refloated.

== 2 March ==
List of shipwrecks: 2 March 1889
Ship	State	Description
Highlands	United Kingdom	The steamship ran aground near the Gallipoli Old Lighthouse, Ottoman Empire. She was on a voyage from Kustendje, Romania to Gibraltar.
Otter	United States	The schooner departed from San Francisco, California, bound for the Shumagin Islands in the eastern Aleutian Islands, District of Alaska and was never seen or heard from again. Her entire crew of 23 men were lost.
Sultan	Flag unknown	The steamship was abandoned in the Atlantic Ocean in a sinking condition. Her 38 crew were rescued by Nevada (United Kingdom). Sultan was on a voyage from Norfolk, Virginia, United States to Bremen, Germany.

== 3 March ==
List of shipwrecks: 3 March 1889
Ship	State	Description
Alcinous, and Palma	United Kingdom	The steamship Palma collided with Alcinous at South Shields, County Durham. Both vessels were severely damaged.
James A. Hamilton	United States	The whaling schooner departed from San Francisco, California bound for Unalaska, District of Alaska and was never seen or heard from again. Lost with all 21 people on board.
Jane Owen	United Kingdom	The schooner was driven ashore and sank at New Grimsby, Isles of Scilly. She was on a voyage from Aberdovey, Merionethshire to Plymouth, Devon.

== 4 March ==
List of shipwrecks: 4 March 1889
Ship	State	Description
Sumatra	United Kingdom	The steamship caught fire and sank in the Mediterranean Sea with the loss of a crew member. Survivors were rescued by the steamship Glenearn (United Kingdom). Sumatra was on a voyage from Batoum, Russia to Hong Kong.

== 5 March ==
List of shipwrecks: 5 March 1889
Ship	State	Description
Chase	United Kingdom	The schooner struck the South Rock. She was on a voyage from Rochester, Kent to Ardrossan, Ayrshire. She completed her voyage in a leaky condition.
Isaac A. Chapman	United States	The schooner went ashore on Plum Island, Newburyport, Massachusetts. Though severely damaged, she was refloated, repaired and returned to service.

== 6 March ==
List of shipwrecks: 6 March 1889
Ship	State	Description
Belladonna	United Kingdom	The ship departed from Zakynthos, Greece for Falmouth, Cornwall. No further trace, reported overdue.
Glenloch	United Kingdom	The steamship was driven ashore at Nossibe, Madagascar. She was refloated and resumed her voyage to the Aden Colony.
Hetor	[[|]]	The ship caught fire, exploded and was destroyed at Bône, Algeria with the loss of three of her seventeen crew. Nine people were reported missing.
P. F.	United Kingdom	The brigantine was driven ashore at Rawcliffe, near Staithes, Yorkshire. She floated off and sank. Her crew were rescued.
Sappho	United Kingdom	The barque struck a sunken rock and was abandoned by her crew with some loss of life. She was on a voyage from Buenos Aires, Argentina to Barbados.
HMS Sultan	Royal Navy	The ironclad struck an uncharted rock between Gozo and Malta. She consequently sank on 14 March. She was refloated in August and taken in to Malta for temporary repairs. Subsequently repaired and modernised at Portsmouth, Hampshire between 1892 and 1896.
Thames	United Kingdom	The steamship collided with the steamship Dresden (Germany) in the River Ouse and was beached. Thames was on a voyage from Goole, Yorkshire to London.

== 7 March ==
List of shipwrecks: 7 March 1889
Ship	State	Description
Duke of Buccleugh, and Vandalia	United Kingdom; Canada	The steamship Duke of Buccleugh collided with the full-rigged ship Vandalia and sank in the English Channel 12 to 15 nautical miles (22 to 28 km) south of the Owers Lightship ( Trinity House) with the loss of all 48 people on board and a sailor on board Vandalia. Duke of Buccleugh was en route from Antwerp, Belgium to Calcutta, India. Vandalia was abandoned by her surviving crew, who reached land in the boats. She was on a voyage from New York, United States to London. Taken in tow by two tugs, she subsequently came ashore at Brighton, Sussex. She was refloated in mid-April with the intention of taking her in to Southampton, Hampshire.
Premier	United Kingdom	The barque foundered in the Atlantic Ocean during a hurricane with the loss of three of her crew. She was on a voyage from Rosario, Argentina to Barbados.

== 8 March ==
List of shipwrecks: 8 March 1889
Ship	State	Description
Dora Ewing	United Kingdom	The steamship was driven ashore in the River Tay downstream of Tayport, Fife. She was on a voyage from Tayport to Seaham, County Durham. She was refloated on 10 March with assistance from the tug Excelsior (United Kingdom) and resumed her voyage.
Vega	United Kingdom	The steamship was driven ashore and wrecked near Langton Matravers, Dorset. All 29 people on board were rescued.

== 9 March ==
List of shipwrecks: 9 March 1889
Ship	State	Description
Beagle	United Kingdom	The schooner was driven ashore at Enersholmen, Norway. She was on a voyage from Hull, Yorkshire to Brevig, Norway.
Nagpore	United Kingdom	The full-rigged ship was driven ashore in the River Thames at Greenhithe, Kent. She was refloated.
Salus	Flag unknown	The ship was driven ashore with the loss of all hands. The wreck was refloated and towed in to Hamburgsund, Norway.
Spindrift, Violet, and Wave	United Kingdom	The tug Spindrift was towing the sloops Violet and Wave from Boston, Lincolnshire to Grangemouth, Stirlingshire when all three vessels foundered in the North Sea off Flamborough Head, Yorkshire. The crews were rescued by the smack Research and the steamship Rocklands (both United Kingdom).
Transit	United Kingdom	The barque struck a rock and foundered. Her crew were rescued. She was on a voyage from Singapore, Straits Settlements to Hong Kong.
Welsh Prince	United Kingdom	The steamship sprang a leak and sank in the River Usk.
Zena	United Kingdom	The steamship collided with the hulk 32 (United Kingdom) at Gibraltar and was damaged.

== 10 March ==
List of shipwrecks: 10 March 1889
Ship	State	Description
Condor	United Kingdom	The tugboat was run into by the steamship Chatham (United Kingdom off Dover, Kent and was damaged. She put in to Dover.
Florence Richards	United Kingdom	The steamship foundered off Cabo da Roca, Portugal.
Lisbon	United Kingdom	The steamship collided with the steamship Lydian Monarch (United Kingdom) in the River Thames. She put back to London in a leaky condition.
Omonia	Greece	The ship was wrecked at Alexandretta, Ottoman Empire.
Tern	United Kingdom	The steamship ran aground on the Nore. She was refloated with assistance from the steamship Cologne (United Kingdom).
Themis	Greece	The ship was driven ashore at Alexandretta and severely damaged.

== 11 March ==
List of shipwrecks: 11 March 1889
Ship	State	Description
Cathay	United Kingdom	The steamship ran aground at Penarth, Glamorgan.
Plover	United Kingdom	The barque collided with the steamship Benefactor (United Kingdom) and sank in the English Channel 12 nautical miles (22 km) west of Dungeness, Kent with the loss of one of her eleven crew. Survivors were rescued by Benefactor. Plover was on a voyage from South Shields, County Durham to Palma de Mallorca, Mallorca, Spain.

== 12 March ==
List of shipwrecks: 12 March 1889
Ship	State	Description
Lucknow	United Kingdom	The ship was sighted in the Pacific Ocean whilst on a voyage from Newcastle, New South Wales to San Francisco, California. No further trace, reported missing.

== 13 March ==
List of shipwrecks: 13 March 1889
Ship	State	Description
Kangaroo	United States	The steamship sank while laying at Spottsville, Kentucky. Her captain/owner and his nephew were killed.

== 14 March ==
List of shipwrecks: 14 March 1889
Ship	State	Description
Agnes Barton	United States	The bark was leaking badly and was being driven ashore in a gale when deliberately beached south of Cape Henry in an attempt to save lives. She later capsized. Her Captain and 5 crewmen died, 4 rescued.

== 15 March ==
List of shipwrecks: 15 March 1889
Ship	State	Description
Pettengill	United States	The barque was wrecked in Chesapeake Bay with the loss of all fourteen crew.
Platina	United Kingdom	The barque ran aground at Porto, Portugal. She was refloated.
Tris Yerarki	Greece	The brig ran aground on the Doganastan Shoal, in the Sea of Marmara. She was on a voyage from Rodosto, Ottoman Empire to Marseille, Bouches-du-Rhône, France.
Unnamed	United Kingdom	The fishing boat foundered west of the Shetland Islands with the loss of all four crew.

== 16 March ==
List of shipwrecks: 16 March 1889
Ship	State	Description
Ada Owen	Flag unknown	1889 Apia cyclone: The ship was driven ashore at "Muara". Her crew survived.
SMS Adler	Imperial German Navy	SMS Adler 1889 Apia cyclone: The gunboat was wrecked in the harbor at Apia, Samoa, with the loss of twenty lives.
Agur	Denmark	1889 Apia Cyclone: The schooner was driven ashore and wrecked at Apia.
SMS Eber	Imperial German Navy	Wrecked ships in Apia Harbor, Upolu, Samoa soon after the storm. The view looks northwestward, with the shattered bow of the German gunboat Eber on the beach in the foreground. The stern of USS Trenton is at right, with the sunken USS Vandalia alongside. The German gunboat Adler is on her side in the center distance. USS Trenton's starboard quarter gallery has been largely ripped away. 1889 Apia cyclone: The gunboat was forced against the harbor reef at Apia by large waves and sank quickly with the loss of 73 lives.
Goatfell	United Kingdom	The barque heeled over against the quayside at Leith, Lothian. She was later righted; her rigging was severely damaged.
USS Nipsic	United States Navy	The wreck of USS Nipsic is at left; the wreck of USS Trenton is at center, with the wreck of USS Vandalia alongside in the center. 1889 Apia cyclone: The gunboat was driven ashore in the harbor at Apia with severe damage and the loss of eight lives. She was refloated, repaired, and returned to service.
Peter Goddefroy	Flag unknown	1889 Apia Cyclone: The barque was driven ashore at Apia.
Red Cross	United States	1889 Apia Cyclone: The full-rigged ship was driven ashore and wrecked at Raratonga, Cook Islands. Her crew were rescued. She was on a voyage from Newcastle, New South Wales to San Francisco, California.
Suakin	United Kingdom	1889 Apia Cyclone: The ship was driven ashore and wrecked on Aitutaki, Cook Islands with the loss of all hands, She was on a voyage from Newcastle, New South Wales to San Francisco.
USS Trenton	United States Navy	The wreck of USS Trenton is at left, with the wreck of USS Vandalia alongside. The wreck of SMS Olga at right. 1889 Apia cyclone: The steamship was wrecked in the harbor at Apia with the loss of one life.
USS Vandalia	United States Navy	The wreck of USS Vandalia, seen from the wreck of USS Trenton. 1889 Apia cyclone: The sloop-of-war was wrecked in the harbor at Apia with the loss of 43 lives.
Seven unnamed vessels	Kingdom of Samoa	1889 Apia Cyclone: The coasters were driven ashore at Apia with the loss of four lives.

== 17 March ==
List of shipwrecks: 17 March 1889
Ship	State	Description
Croma	United Kingdom	The steamship caught fire at Liverpool, Lancashire.

== 19 March ==
List of shipwrecks: 19 March 1889
Ship	State	Description
Aid	United Kingdom	The dredger collided with the steamship Birling at Amble, Northumberland and was severely damaged.
Kate & Anna	United States	The steam sealing schooner was blown ashore and wrecked on the southwestern shore of Morzovia Bay, later called Morzovhoi Bay (55°N 163°W), on the Alaska Peninsula on the coast of the District of Alaska after her anchor line parted in a gale. Her six crew survived.
Earnford	United Kingdom	The steamship ran aground at Dover, Kent. She was on a voyage from Newcastle upon Tyne, Northumberland to Cardiff, Glamorgan. She was refloated and resumed her voyage.

== 20 March ==
List of shipwrecks: 20 March 1889
Ship	State	Description
Anna Maria	United Kingdom	The ketch was driven ashore and wrecked at Scurdie Ness, Forfarshire. Her three crew were rescued. She was on a voyage from "Bridgness" to Peterhead, Aberdeenshire.
Augur	United Kingdom	The ship was wrecked at Apia, Samoan Islands.
Batavia	Netherlands	The full-rigged ship collided with the barque Prince Edward (Norway at Leith, Lothian, United Kingdom and was severely damaged.
Bengollyun	United Kingdom	The ship departed from Garston, Lancashire for Pisagua, Chile. Presumed subsequently foundered with the loss of all hands. A boat with the ships name was washed ashore at Cemlyn Bay and another at Porthwen Bay.
De Kar	United Kingdom	The ketch was driven ashore at Spittal, Northumberland. Her four crew were rescued by the Berwick Lifeboat. She was on a voyage from Hull, Yorkshire to Berwick upon Tweed, Northumberland.
Elizabeth	Norway	The derelict schooner was driven ashore and wrecked at Dunbar, Lothian.
Isabella Diston	United Kingdom	The ship departed from Cork for Newcastle upon Tyne, Northumberland. No further trace, reported missing.
New Pelton	United Kingdom	The steamship was run into by the full-rigged ship Batavia (Netherlands) at Leith and was severely damaged.
Nukunove	(Samoa) Samoan Islands	The coasting schooner was wrecked at Apia.
Peter Godeffroy	United Kingdom	The barque was wrecked at Apia.
Upulu	(Samoa) Samoan Islands	The coasting schooner was severely damaged at Apia.
Visitele	(Samoa) Samoan Islands	The coasting schooner was severely damaged at Apia.
Two unnamed vessels	United Kingdom	The fishing boats foundered off the Port of Ness, Isle of Lewis with the loss of all twelve crew.
Unnamed	Flag unknown	The ship was driven ashore at South Shields, County Durham, United Kingdom.

== 21 March ==
List of shipwrecks: 21 March 1889
Ship	State	Description
Helena	United Kingdom	The schooner was wrecked on Jacob's Rocks, near Halifax, Nova Scotia, Canada. Her eight crew survived.
Lena	United Kingdom	The schooner was run into by the steamship Tanfield (United Kingdom) and sank in the River Thames at Greenwich, London.
110	French Navy	The torpedo boat foundered in the English Channel off Cape Barfleur, Manche with the loss of all hands. She was on a voyage from Le Havre, Seine-Inférieure to Cherbourg, Manche.

== 22 March ==
List of shipwrecks: 22 March 1889
Ship	State	Description
Arno	United Kingdom	The steamship collided with the tugs Eva and Little England (both United Kingdom at Harwich, Essex and was holed. Arno was on a voyage from Dedeagac, Greece to Ipswich, Suffolk. She completed her voyage.
Emma	Netherlands	The barque was wrecked near Whitby, Yorkshire, United Kingdom. Her crew were rescued. She was on a voyage from Amsterdam, North Holland to South Shields, County Durham, United Kingdom.
Friary	United Kingdom	The steamship was driven ashore in the Dardanelles at "Youmkali", Ottoman Empire. She was on a voyage from Odessa, Russia to Rotterdam, South Holland, Netherlands. She was refloated and resumed her voyage.
Unnamed	Flag unknown	The barque ran aground on the Sunk Sand, in the North Sea off the coast of Essex.

== 23 March ==
List of shipwrecks: 23 March 1889
Ship	State	Description
Hawkhurst	United Kingdom	The steamship caught fire in the Atlantic Ocean. She was on a voyage from London to Rio de Janeiro, Brazil. She arrived at Rio de Janeiro on 4 April still burning.
John Wells	United Kingdom	The steamship was damaged by fire at Goole, Yorkshire.
Pauline	Norway	The ship departed from Christiania for the Firth of Forth. No further trace, reported missing.
Scotland	United Kingdom	The tug foundered in the North Sea 20 nautical miles (37 km) east of Blyth, Northumberland. Her crew were rescued by the steamship Libra (United Kingdom).
375	Russia	The lighter sank at Kronstadt.

== 25 March ==
List of shipwrecks: 25 March 1889
Ship	State	Description
Danish Prince	United Kingdom	The steam fishing boat departed from the River Tyne for the North Sea. She subsequently foundered with the loss of all eight crew, possibly in a storm the next day.
Shiloh	United States	The fishing schooner was sunk in a collision with the schooner N. B. Stetson (United States). All fourteen crew were killed.

== 26 March ==
List of shipwrecks: 26 March 1889
Ship	State	Description
Bona Fides	Norway	The barque was wrecked on a reef on the coast of New Guinea. All fifteen people on board reached Murray Island, Queensland. She was on a voyage from Newcastle, New South Wales to Tjilatjap, Netherlands East Indies.
Brandon	United Kingdom	The steamship was driven ashore on Hog Island. She was on a voyage from Cardiff, Glamorgan to Limerick. She was refloated the next day and resumed her voyage.
Chancellor	United Kingdom	The steam fishing boat was driven ashore at Seahouses, Northumberland. Her crew were rescued by rocket apparatus.
Dabulamanza	Flag unknown	The steamship caught fire at Port Natal, Natal Colony.
Mindanao, and Visayas	(Spain) Spanish East Indies	The steamships collided at Manila. Mindanao sank with the loss of 30 lives. Visayas was severely damaged.

== 27 March ==
List of shipwrecks: 27 March 1889
Ship	State	Description
Norway	Flag unknown	The ship was abandoned at sea. Her crew were rescued by Winnipeg (Flag unknown).
Orion	United Kingdom	The barge ran aground on the Wallet Sand, in the North Sea off the coast of Essex. She was on a voyage from Harwich to Colchester. She was refloated with the assistance of two smack and assisted in to Brightlingsea, Essex.
Szapary	Austria-Hungary	The ship ran aground in the River Tees at Portrack, County Durham, United Kingdom. She was on a voyage from Middlesbrough, Yorkshire to Stockton-on-Tees, County Durham. She was refloated.

== 28 March ==
List of shipwrecks: 28 March 1889
Ship	State	Description
Ruth Darling	United States	The schooner was run into and sunk by the steamship Wyanoke (United States) in dense fog between Absecon, New Jersey and Cape May. Her captain and a crewman were killed.

== 29 March ==
List of shipwrecks: 29 March 1889
Ship	State	Description
Comtesse de Flandre	Belgium	The paddle steamer was run into by the paddle steamer Princesse Henriette (Belgium). Comtesse de Flandre was on a voyage from Ostend, West Flanders to Dover, Kent, United Kingdom. She was cut in two with the loss of fifteen lives. The bow section sank. The stern section capsized. It was towed by Princesse Henriette in to Ostend, where it sank.
Merry Lass	United Kingdom	The Brixham trawler was wrecked near Dartmouth, Devon

== 30 March ==
List of shipwrecks: 30 March 1889
Ship	State	Description
Stella	United Kingdom	The steamship ran onto Les Casquets, off Alderney, Channel Islands and sank with the loss of more than 80 lives. She was on a voyage from Southampton, Hampshire to Guernsey and Jersey, Channel Islands.

== 31 March ==
List of shipwrecks: 31 March 1889
Ship	State	Description
Gettysberg	United Kingdom	The barque was wrecked on the Morant Cays with the loss of seven of her sixteen crew. She was on a voyage from Montevideo, Uruguay to Pensacola, Florida, United States.

== Unknown date ==
List of shipwrecks: Unknown date in March 1889
Ship	State	Description
Aberdour	United Kingdom	The steamship was driven ashore near Smyrna, Ottoman Empire. She was refloated on 22 March and resumed her voyage.
Achsah	United Kingdom	The brig was driven ashore on Cuttyhunk Island, Massachusetts, United States.
Amana	United Kingdom	The ship ran aground at Cardiff, Glamorgan. She was refloated and resumed her voyage.
Artisan	United Kingdom	The barque ran aground. She was on a voyage from Saigon, French Indo-China to Iloilo, Spanish East Indies. She was refloated and put in to Manila, Spanish East Indies in a leaky condition.
Axelhuus	Denmark	The steamship was driven ashore in Seierø Bay. She was refloated with the assistance of a steamship and taken in to Kalundborg.
Cathay	United Kingdom	The steamship ran aground off Penarth Head, Glamorgan.
Champion	United Kingdom	The brig was wrecked at Pohnpei, Caroline Islands in a cyclone. Her crew were rescued by the barque Morning Star (United Kingdom).
City of Lincoln	United Kingdom	The ship was driven ashore in the Dry Tortugas. She was on a voyage from Bremerhaven, Germany to New Orleans, Louisiana, United States. She was refloated and resumed her voyage.
Coanza	United Kingdom	The steamship ran aground in the Elbe at Schulau, Germany.
Coningsby	United Kingdom	The steamship ran aground in the Small Bitter Lake
Crested Wave	United Kingdom	The ship was wrecked at Cabaret, Haiti. Her crew were rescued.
Deveron	United Kingdom	The schooner ran aground on the Sonderosse, in the Baltic Sea. She was on a voyage from St. Davids, Pembrokeshire to Danzig, Germany.
Drie Gezusters	Netherlands	The schooner was driven ashore on Vlieland, Friesland.
Drie Gezuysters	Netherlands	The schooner sprang a severe leak and was beached at Egersund, Norway. She was on a voyage from Amsterdam, North Holland to Arendal, Norway.
Ebenezer	United Kingdom	The schooner ran aground on the Sunk Sand, in the North Sea off the coast of Essex. She was refloated with the assistance of two smack and assisted in to Harwich in a leaky condition.
Galatz	United Kingdom	The steamship ran aground on the West Hoyle Bank, in the River Dee. She was on a voyage from Cartagena, Spain to Mostyn, Flintshire.
Gavenwood	United Kingdom	The schooner was abandoned off Mazagan, Morocco and subsequently came ashore. She was refloated on 24 March.
Georg	Germany	The steamship was driven ashore. She was on a voyage from Liepāja, Courland Governorate to Rouen, Seine-Inférieure, France. She was refloated and put in to Helsingør, Demark.
Gryfe	United Kingdom	The full-rigged ship ran aground at Banyuwangi, Netherlands East Indies. She was on a voyage from Pasaruang, Netherlands East Indies to Greenock, Renfrewshire. She was refloated with assistance.
Gustaf Tillberg	Sweden	The steamship was driven ashore at Limhamn between 12 and 17 March. She was on a voyage from Pillau, Germany to Cork, United Kingdom.
Haavaad	Norway	The barque was wrecked in the Chandeleur Islands, Louisiana, United States. Her crew were rescued.
Herbert	United Kingdom	The schooner was driven ashore at Fishguard, Pembrokeshire. She was on a voyage from London to Fishguard. She was refloated and found to be severely leaky.
Highlands	United Kingdom	The steamship ran aground at Gallipoli, Ottoman Empire. She was on a voyage from Constanţa, Romania to Gibraltar. She was refloated on 3 March and resumed her voyage.
Ida	Germany	The steamship ran aground at Saltholmen, Denmark.
Inchlonga	United Kingdom	The steamship ran aground in the Suez Canal. She was refloated on 11 March.
Janbaas	Germany	The barque was wrecked on the coast of New Guinea.
Klyde	Flag unknown	The steamship ran aground in the Suez Canal. She was later refloated and towed in to Suez, Egypt.
Mabel	United Kingdom	The brigantine was driven ashore and wrecked with the loss of four of her five crew. She was on a voyage from Portmadoc, Caernarfonshire to Morocco.
Marianne	Germany	The barque was driven ashore on Skagen, Denmark. She was on a voyage from Ghent, East Flanders, Belgium to Copenhagen, Denmark.
Marryat	Argentina	The ship was abandoned at sea. Her crew were rescued. She was on a voyage from Bahia Blanca to New York, United States.
Medelped	Sweden	The barque was driven ashore at "Vuelta Antonio". She was on a voyage from Cardiff to Campana, Argentina.
Meta	Norway	The barque ran aground on the Longsand, in the North Sea off the coast of Essex. She was on a voyage from Sundsvall Sweden to Appledore, Devon, United Kingdom. She was refloated and towed in the Harwich in a waterlogged condition by the tugs Harwich and Robert Owen (both United Kingdom).
Monte Rosa	Germany	The ship ran aground in the Suez Canal. She was refloated and towed in to Suez for repairs.
Presto	United Kingdom	The steamship collided with the steamship Anna Woermann (Germany) at Hamburg, Germany and was beached. Presto was on a voyage from Hamburg to Middlesbrough, Yorkshire.
Prindssen	Flag unknown	The ship ran aground on the Romer Shoal off the coast of New York, United States. She was refloated.
Reward	United Kingdom	The brigantine was driven ashore near Tilburyness, Essex. She was refloated with assistance.
Ross	United Kingdom	The steamship was driven ashore at Huelva, Spain. She was later refloated and towed in to Huelva.
Stadsman	Sweden	The schooner was driven ashore on Skagen. She was on a voyage from Ghent to Falkenberg.
Standard	United Kingdom	The schooner was driven ashore at Inverallochy, Aberdeenshire. She was on a voyage from Sunderland, County Durham to Cromarty.
St. Cloud	United Kingdom	The ship caught fire and was abandoned at sea. All on board were rescued. She was on a voyage from New York to Batavia, Netherlands East Indies. A derelict vessel, thought to be St. Cloud, washed up in a capsized condition at Maceió, Brazil on 18 March.
Temple Bar	United States	The ship was driven ashore and wrecked at Coruripe, Brazil. She was on a voyage from Rio de Janeiro, Brazil to Pensacola, Florida.
Thropton	United Kingdom	The ship ran aground in the Bec d'Ambès.
Transition	United Kingdom	The ship ran aground at "Kais", Persia.
Triente	United Kingdom	The ship collided with the steamship Guyers (France) and sank at Ouistreham, Calvados.
Triton	Norway	The ship ran aground at Grimstad. She was on a voyage from Kragerø to Leith, Lothian, United Kingdom.
Varuna	Norway	The barque was driven ashore and wrecked at Puerto Plata, Dominican Republic.
Vega	Germany	The steamship was driven ashore on Sprogø, Denmark. She was on a voyage from Memel to an English port. She was refloated with the assistance of a steamship and resumed her voyage.
Volante de Dieu	Italy	The schooner was driven ashore and wrecked at Cap Leucate, Aude, France with the loss of all hands.
Westbury	United Kingdom	The steamship ran aground at Blackhouse. She was on a voyage from Glasgow, Renfrewshire to Newry, County Antrim. She was refloated and resumed her voyage in a leaky condition.
William B. Wood	United States	The schooner was driven ashore and wrecked at Chincoteague, Virginia.
Zarate	United Kingdom	The steamship was driven ashore on the Isla de Lobos, Uruguay. She was refloated and taken in to Montevideo, Uruguay.
Unnamed	Austria-Hungary	The ship was destroyed by fire at Port-de-Bouc, Bouches-du-Rhône, France with some loss of life.
Unnamed	Mexico	The steamship sank in Lake Chapala with the loss of at least twenty lives.
No. 110	French Navy	The torpedo boat foundered off Pointe de Barfleur during a storm, with loss of fourteen crew.
