= Forcalquier =

Forcalquier Forcauquier (Provençal)
- Subprefecture and commune
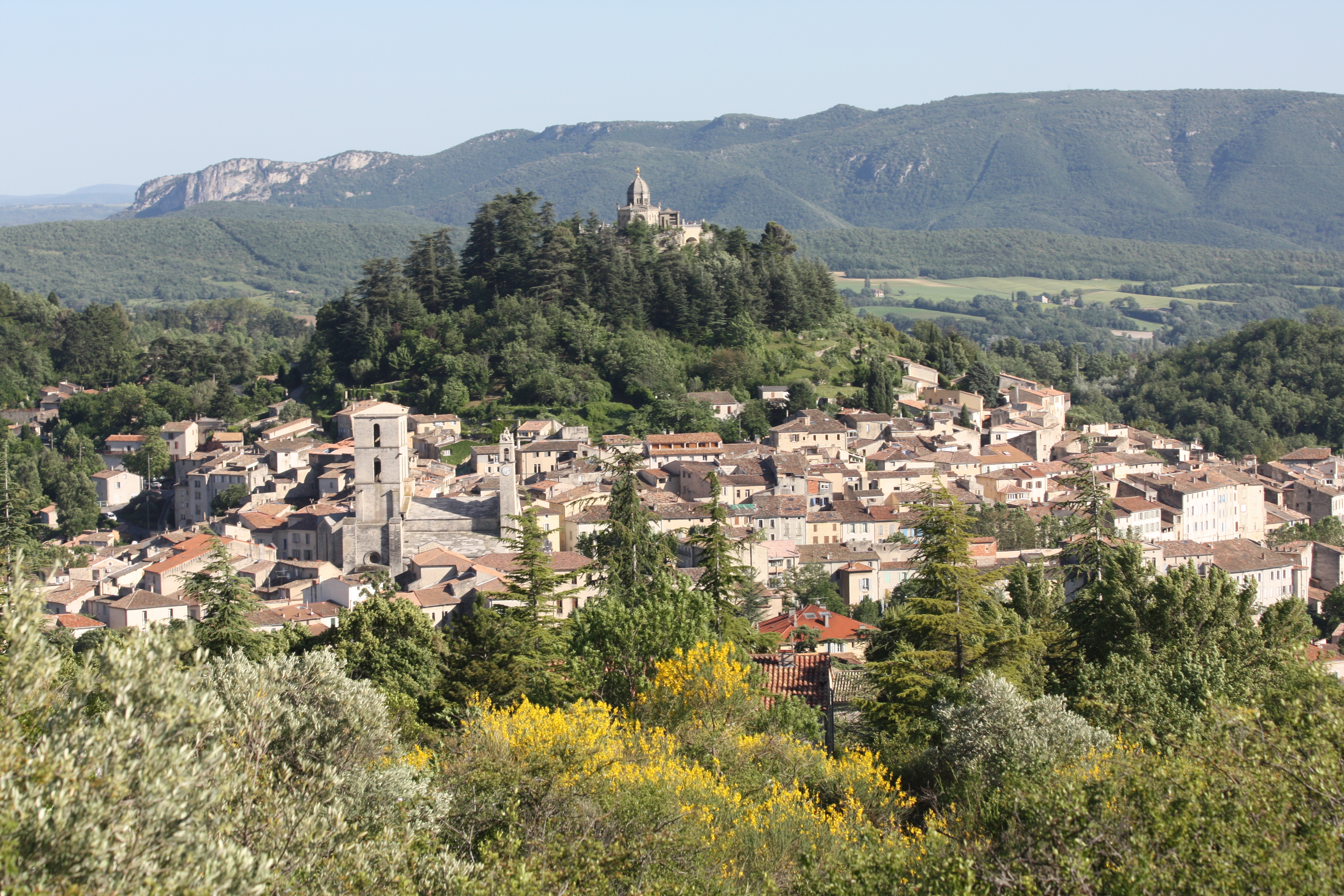
- A general view of Forcalquier, with the Luberon Massif in the background

- Coat of arms
- Location of Forcalquier
- Location within France Location within Provence-Alpes-Côte d'Azur
- Coordinates: 43°57′36″N 5°46′50″E
- Country: France
- Region: Provence-Alpes-Côte d'Azur
- Department: Alpes-de-Haute-Provence
- Arrondissement: Forcalquier
- Canton: Forcalquier
- Intercommunality: Pays de Forcalquier et Montagne de Lure

Government
  - Mayor (2026–32): David Gehant
- Area^{1}: 42.76 km^{2} (16.51 sq mi)
- Elevation: 550 m (1,800 ft)
- Highest elevation: 904 m (2,966 ft)
- Lowest elevation: 397 m (1,302 ft)
- Population (2023): 5,222
  - Density: 122.1/km^{2} (316.3/sq mi)
- Time zone: UTC+01:00 (CET)
  - Summer (DST): UTC+02:00 (CEST)
- INSEE/Postal code: 04088 /04300
- ^{1} French Land Register data, which excludes lakes, ponds, glaciers > 1 km^{2} (0.386 sq mi or 247 acres) and river estuaries.

Forcalquier (French: [fɔʁkalkje]; Provençal: Forcauquier [fuʀkɔwˈkje]) is a commune in the Alpes-de-Haute-Provence department in southeastern France.

Forcalquier is located between the Lure Mountain^{(fr)} and Luberon mountain ranges, about 30 km (19 mi) south of Sisteron and 10 km (6.2 mi) west of the Durance river. During the Middle Ages it was the capital of Haute-Provence.

== History ==
Furnus Calcarius was the Latin name, from the lime kilns used in Roman times. (A Roman bridge still stands in the valley to the south of the town.) Its Provençal name is Fourcauquié. At the end of the 11th century, a family of the counts of Provence created the county of Forcalquier.

During this time, the town of Forcalquier was the capital of Haute Provence along the Durance, which included the towns of Manosque, Sisteron, Gap and Embrun. Forcalquier minted its own currency, and its church was elevated to the status of a "concathedral".

The counts of Forcalquier grew to a power that could defy the counts of Provence. Rivalry ended in 1195 when Gersende de Sabran, countess of Forcalquier, married Alfonso II, count of Provence. Their son, Ramon Bérenger IV, inherited the two counties.

== Population ==
The inhabitants are called Forcalquiérens in French.

Historical population

Year	Pop.	±% p.a.
1793	2,547	—
1800	2,539	−0.04%
1806	2,768	+1.45%
1821	2,992	+0.52%
1831	3,036	+0.15%
1836	3,022	−0.09%
1841	3,065	+0.28%
1846	3,087	+0.14%
1851	3,053	−0.22%
1856	2,965	−0.58%
1861	2,956	−0.06%
1866	2,841	−0.79%
1872	2,719	−0.73%
1876	2,717	−0.02%
1881	2,843	+0.91%
1886	3,002	+1.09%
1891	3,038	+0.24%
1896	3,018	−0.13%
1901	3,023	+0.03%

Year	Pop.	±% p.a.
1906	3,034	+0.07%
1911	3,004	−0.20%
1921	2,552	−1.62%
1926	2,528	−0.19%
1931	2,588	+0.47%
1936	2,535	−0.41%
1946	2,262	−1.13%
1954	2,609	+1.80%
1962	2,518	−0.44%
1968	2,979	+2.84%
1975	3,312	+1.53%
1982	3,782	+1.91%
1990	3,993	+0.68%
1999	4,302	+0.83%
2007	4,649	+0.97%
2012	4,775	+0.54%
2017	5,018	+1.00%
2023	5,222	+0.67%

Source: EHESS and INSEE (1968-2023)

== Sights ==
Forcalquier is built around the slopes of a steep conical hill, crowned by an octagonal chapel, Notre Dame de Provence, where the medieval citadel once stood. The citadel was destroyed in 1601; the chapel with its panoramic view was built in 1875. It has a carillon that can be heard every Sunday morning during the summer.

The oldest part of the town is the area around the Place Saint-Michel with its Renaissance fountain (1511) and its narrow side-streets. There many doorways dating to the 12th to 16th centuries can be found.

The present commercial and social center of town, the Place du Bourget, is located below the Place St. Michel. The 12th century "concathedral" Notre Dame de l'Assomption with its bell towers stands across from the Place du Bourguet.

The Cordeliers Convent was built in the 13th century by Franciscans named "cordeliers" because of their rope belts. This convent was occupied by monks continuously until the Revolution. It now houses the Université Européenne des Senteurs & Saveurs. The Port de Cordeliers is all that remains of the town's fortified walls.

Monday morning is market day in Forcalquier. The market fills the Place du Bourguet and the adjoining streets.

Noteworthy is the Musée Municipal with its prehistoric and Gallo-Roman artifacts, glass works, and faïence pottery from Mane, Apt and Moustiers-Sainte-Marie.

== Notable people ==
- Geoffrey II of Provence (died 1067)
- Alfonso II, Count of Provence (1180–1209)
- Garsenda of Forcalquier (c. 1180 – c. 1242), Countess of Forcalquier from 1209
- Ramon Berenguer IV, Count of Provence (1198–1245)
- Jaufre Reforzat de Trets (fl. 1213–1237)
- Marguerite of Provence (1221–1295)
- Guigues VII of Viennois (1225–1269)
- Charles I of Naples (1226/1227–1285)
- Joan I of Naples (1326/1327–1382)
- Ladislaus of Naples (1377–1414)
- Louis III of Naples (1403–1434)
- Louis Feuillée (1660–1732), explorer and scientist
- Raoul Dufy (1877–1953), Fauvist painter
- David Galloway (1937–2019), writer
- Christophe Castaner (born 1966), politician

== International relations ==
Forcalquier is officially twinned with:

- Guastalla, Italy

== See also ==
- Communes of the Alpes-de-Haute-Provence department
- Henri Bardouin
