= Rainou of Sabran =

Member of the noble House of Sabran

Rainou of Sabran (c. 1155 – 1224) (also Rainon II or Rénier II) was the Count of Forcalquier, Lord of Caylar and Ansouis, and a member of the noble House of Sabran. His father was Rostaing of Sabran and his mother was Rosca of Uzès.

He married Garsenda de Forcalquier († before 1193), daughter of Guillaume Comte of Forcalquier and Beatrice of Forcalquier.

Their daughter, Garsenda II, married Alfonso II of Provence in 1193.

== Sources ==
- Cirera i Prim, Jaume (1954). "Filiación de los Montcada que asistieron a la conquista de Mallorca". Memòries de la Reial Acadèmia Mallorquina d'Estudis Genealògics, Heràldics i Històrics. 2 (1–4): 101–12.
- Cox, Eugene L. (1974). The Eagles of Savoy. Princeton, NJ: Princeton University Press. ISBN 0691052166.
- Miret i Sans, Joaquim (1902). "La casa de Montcada en el Vizcondado de Bearn". Boletín de la Real Academia de Buenas Letras de Barcelona. 1 (6): 280–303.
- Shideler, John C. (1983). Medieval Catalan Noble Family: The Montcadas, 1000–1230. University of California Press. ISBN 0520045785.
