= Alfonso II of Provence =

Alfonso II
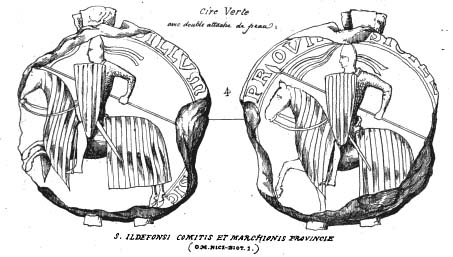
- Seal of Alfonso II

Count of Provence
- Reign: 1185–1209
- Predecessor: Sancho
- Successor: Ramon Berenguer V
- Born: 1180; Barcelona, Principality of Catalonia, Crown of Aragon
- Died: 2 February 1209 (aged 28–29); Palermo, Kingdom of Sicily
- Spouse: Garsenda II of Sabran
- Issue: Ramon Berenguer V Garsenda of Provence, Viscountess of Béarn
- House: Barcelona
- Father: Alfonso II of Aragon
- Mother: Sancha of Castile

Alfonso II (1180 – 2 February 1209) was the second son of Alfonso II of Aragon (who was Alfonso I of Provence) and Sancha of Castile. His father transferred the County of Provence from his uncle Sancho to him in 1185. Alfonso II was born in Barcelona.

In 1193, Alfonso married Gersenda II of Sabran, daughter of Rainou of Sabran and Garsenda I of Forcalquier, daughter of William IV of Forcalquier. Garsenda was named after her mother, who was the heiress of William IV, but predeceased him. Garsenda therefore inherited Forcalquier from her grandfather. She was only thirteen years of age when, in 1193, her grandfather William IV and Alfonso II signed the Treaty of Aix whereby Garsenda would inherit William's county and would marry Alfonso, who was in line to become Count of Provence. The marriage took place at Aix-en-Provence in July 1193.

Their son was Ramon Berenguer V as count of Provence. Their daughter, Garsenda, married Guillermo II de Montcada, and bore him two children, including Gaston VII, Viscount of Béarn.

According to explanations in the manuscripts of Gaucelm Faidit's poems, Alfonso was a rival of the troubadour for the love of Jourdaine d'Embrun.

Alfonso II died in Palermo, Sicily, while accompanying his sister Constance to her wedding with Frederick II, Holy Roman Emperor.

== Sources ==
- Aurell, Martin (1995). Les noces du comte: mariage et pouvoir en Catalogne (785-1213) (in French). Publications de la Sorbonne.
- Boutière, J.; Schutz, A.-H., eds. (1964). Biographies des troubadours. Nizet.
- Howell, Margaret (2001). Eleanor of Provence: Queenship in Thirteenth-Century England. Blackwell Publishers.
- Sabaté, Flocel, ed. (2017). The Crown of Aragon: A Singular Mediterranean Empire. Brill.
- Smith, Damian J.; Buffery, Helena, eds. (2003). The Book of Deeds of James I of Aragon. Ashgate Publishing.

Preceded by Sancho	Count of Provence; 1185–1209	Succeeded by Ramon Berenguer V
