= Embiez =

French island in the Mediterranean Sea

Coordinates: 43°04′32.82″N 5°47′2.1″E

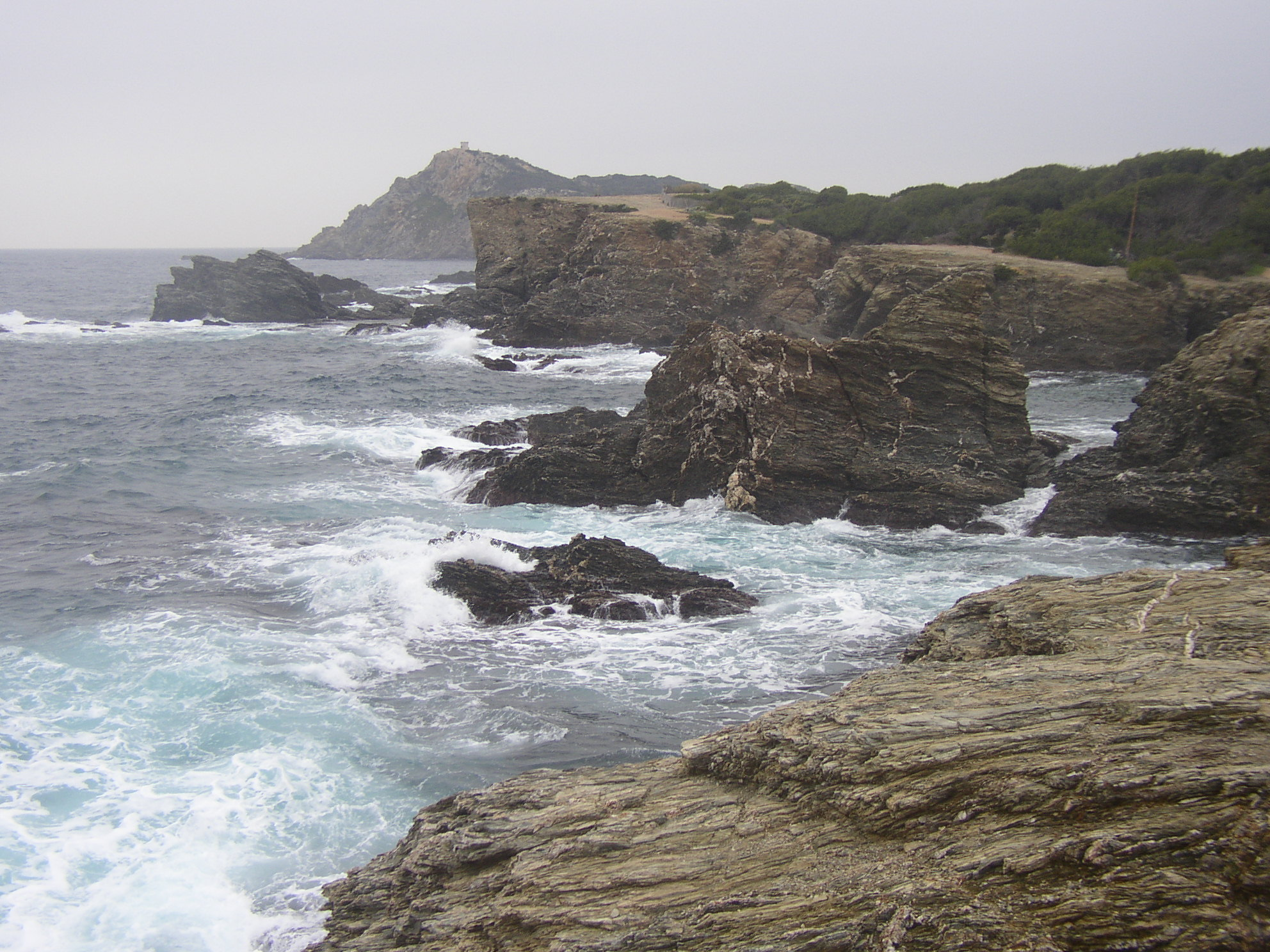
The Embiez islands, at south of the commune of Six-Fours-les-Plages

The Île des Embiez (pronounced [il de [embiez]]) is a French island in the Mediterranean Sea. It is the largest island in the Embiez archipelago. It is located off the coast of the port of Le Brusc in the commune of Six-Fours-les-Plages, in the Var department in the Provence-Alpes-Côte d'Azur region in South Eastern France. The island has a permanent population of 10.

A frequent daily ferry service runs to the island from Le Brusc. Summer boat trips leave from Sanary. The island is 0.9 square kilometers (0.35 sq mi) in size, and its shoreline is 6 kilometers (3.7 mi) long. The island's highest peak is 57 meters (187 feet) high. The port has moorings for 750 boats, and is the home of Le Garlaban, a three mast sailing boat that belonged to Paul Ricard and is now a seafood restaurant (only open in July and August).

The island has a strict environmental policy and its port was the first in the Var to be awarded ISO 14001 certification. The island also has Blue Flag beaches and the surface is protected under Natura 2000. Birds visible on the island include the avocet, the plover, the grey heron, the cormorant and the kingfisher.

The Île des Embiez has a main hotel with 60 rooms and one suite and 150 appartements, one hotel in the pinewood with 20 rooms and a house for private or professional events. The island also has five restaurants, and is the location of the Paul Ricard Oceanographic Institute (Institut océanographique Paul Ricard). Natural attractions include seven beaches, a pine forest and nature trail, and a vineyard. Sporting facilities include tennis pitches and pétanque.

The 10 hectare (25 acre) vineyard is part of the Côtes de Provence AOC region. Its Côtes de Provence wine is made from Grenache and Cinsaut grapes. Its 'Pays des Embiez' wines are available in rosé, (made from Cinsaut and Grenache grape varieties); white wine, (made from Ugni and Sauvignon), and red wine, with (Merlot and Cabernet grapes).

In 1958, the island was bought by industrialist Paul Ricard (1909–1997) the founder of Ricard, the pastis (liquor) manufacturer. Ricard is buried on the Île des Embiez. His grave is on the island's highest point, facing the sea. The island commemorates Ricard's birthday on the 9 July every year.

== See also ==
- The island of Bendor, bought by Ricard in 1950.
