= Pastis Henri Bardouin =

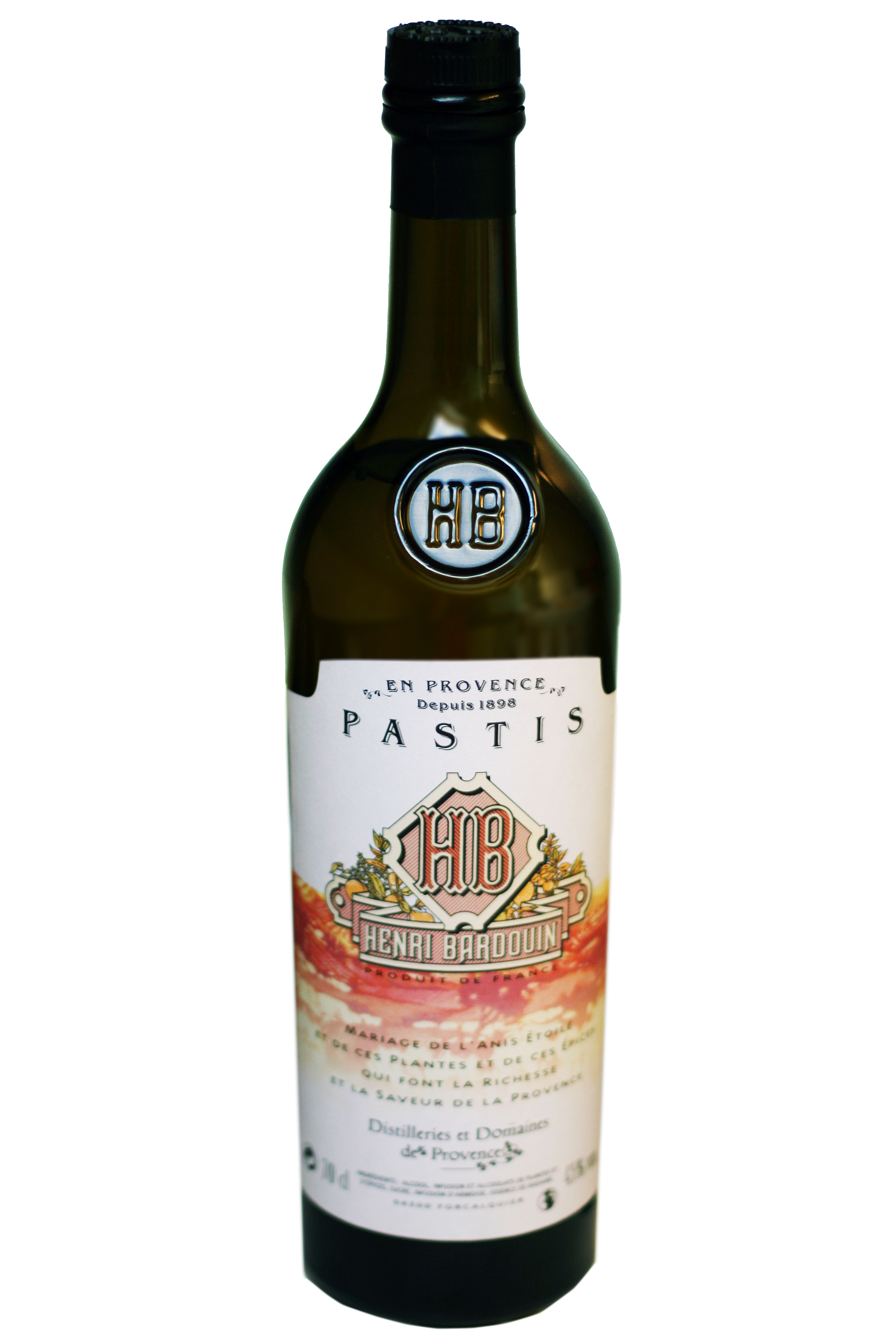
- Type: Pastis
- Manufacturer: Distilleries et Domaines de Provence
- Country of origin: Forcalquier, France
- Alcohol by volume: 45%
- Proof (US): 90
- Color: Yellow
- Flavor: Herbal

Pastis Henri Bardouin is a French pastis marketed as "high-end" made by Distilleries et Domaines de Provence localised in Alpes-de-Haute-Provence.

It contains more than 65 herbs and spices, including mugwort, star anise, centaury, grains of paradise, cardamom, black and white pepper, tonka bean, nutmeg, cloves, garden angelica, cinnamon, lemon balm, sage, rosemary, licorice, thyme, lemon verbena, sweet woodruff, coriander, borage, wall germander, St. John's wort, kidney vetch, wild thyme, chamomile, melilot, oregano, large leaved lime and fennel. Another 21 ingredients are secret.
