= David Galloway (writer) =

American novelist

David Galloway FRSA
- Born: David Darryl Galloway; 5 May 1937; Memphis, Tennessee, U.S
- Died: 28 December 2019 (aged 82); Wuppertal
- Education: Harvard University; University at Buffalo, The State University of New York
- Occupations: Novelist; curator; journalist; professor
- Writing career
- Notable works: A Family Album, Melody Jones, Tamsen

David Darryl Galloway FRSA (born 5 May 1937 – 28 December 2019) was an American novelist, curator, journalist and academic. He was the founding curator of the Tehran Museum of Contemporary Art, a longtime contributor to the International Herald Tribune, an emeritus professor at the Ruhr University Bochum and a fellow of the Royal Society of Arts. The last decades of his life he resided in both France (Forcalquier) and Germany.

== Early life ==
David Galloway was born on 5 May 1937 in Memphis, Tennessee. In 1955 he enrolled in Harvard University, where he was mentored by Leonard Bernstein and Arthur M. Schlesinger Jr. There Galloway met Radcliffe student Sally Gantt, whom he married in 1959, relocating to the University at Buffalo where their son was born two years later.

== Career ==
David Galloway first worked as a publications editor for the Albright-Knox Art Gallery. Leaving the United States, he taught at Trinity College Dublin and the University of Sussex, freelancing as a journalist for The Daily Telegraph, The Times and The Guardian. In 1967 Galloway returned to the U.S. to assist in founding the New Gallery (later renamed the Museum of Contemporary Art Cleveland). He then moved to Germany in 1972 after being appointed as chairman of American studies at the newly established Ruhr University Bochum, meanwhile publishing his first novel, Melody Jones, to wide critical acclaim.

While teaching at the Ruhr University, Galloway lectured extensively throughout Europe, North Africa and the Middle East, including regular visits to the Iran-America Society in Tehran. In 1977 he first met Farah Pahlavi, Shahbanu of Iran, whose staff was preparing to open the Tehran Museum of Contemporary Art in commemoration of the tenth anniversary of the Empress' coronation. Galloway was hired as chief curator and with his staff assembled what is widely considered the most important collection of Western art outside of the Western world, including pieces by Salvador Dalí, Claude Monet, Pablo Picasso, Vincent van Gogh and Andy Warhol, exhibited alongside works by Iranian artists such as Parviz Tanavoli.

Several months before the Iranian Revolution, Galloway left Tehran for Wuppertal, Germany, to resume his professorship in Bochum. While visiting Forcalquier, France, he purchased the town's former episcopal residence, known as the Maison de Chapitre, which he transformed into an informal retreat for artists and students.

In 1979, Galloway began writing for the International Herald Tribune. Throughout his many years at the paper, he maintained a close professional relationship with artists including Pina Bausch, Keith Haring, Yoko Ono and Andy Warhol, contacts much coveted by his editors. Alongside his journalism, Galloway published three more novels: A Family Album, Lamaar Ransom: Private Eye and Tamsen.

After leaving the Ruhr University in 2002, Galloway served as a guest curator at venues including the Venice Biennale and the Moscow Museum of Modern Art while continuing to write for Art in America, ARTnews and the IHT. In 2011, he opened exhibitions at both Art Basel in Miami Beach and the Kunsthalle Wien of paintings by singer Marilyn Manson.

In a career spanning some fifty-five years, David Galloway contributed to over a hundred books on the subjects of art, design, literature and architecture, while curating, reporting and teaching worldwide. He became a fellow of the Royal Society of Arts in 1988.

== Selected bibliography ==
- Pioneering in Art Collecting (1962)
- The Absurd Hero of American Fiction (1966)
- Henry James: The Portrait of a Lady (1967)
- Selected Writings of Edgar Allan Poe (1967)
- Ten Modern American Short Stories (1968)
- Melody Jones (1976)
- David Hockney: Travels with Pen, Pencil and Ink (1977)
- A Family Album (1978)
- Edward Lewis Wallant (1979)
- Lamaar Ransom: Private Eye (1979)
- Calamus (1982)
- The Other Poe (1983)
- Tamsen (1983)
- The Individual Conscience as Subject of Literary Reflection (1986)
- Andy Warhol: Events and Non-Events (1988)
- Keith Haring (1992)
- The Critical Response to Truman Capote (1999)
- Keith Haring: Heaven and Hell (2001)
- Keith Haring: L'art à la plage (2005)
- The Keith Haring Show (2005)
- George Pusenkoff: Mona Lisa Travels (2007)
- Marilyn Manson & David Lynch: Genealogies of Pain (2011)
- Barbara Nessim: An Artful Life – Victoria and Albert Museum (2013)
- Hermann-Josef Kuhna: The Handel Cycle (2015)
- Henri Barande: The Work Beyond (2017)

== See also ==
- Contemporary art
- Forcalquier
- International Herald Tribune
- Museum of Contemporary Art Cleveland
- Farah Pahlavi
- Ruhr University Bochum
- Tehran Museum of Contemporary Art
- University of Sussex
- Wuppertal
