= Paul Ricard Oceanographic Institute =

Oceanographic institute on the Île des Embiez, France

Coordinates: 43°4′53.11″N 5°46′53.06″E

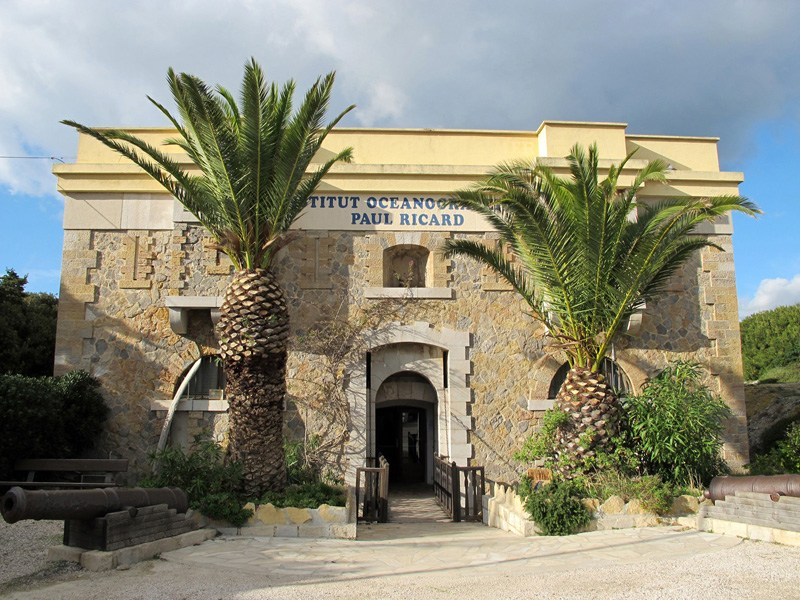
Institut Océanographique Paul Ricard

The Paul Ricard Oceanographic Institute is an oceanographic institute situated on the Île des Embiez. The island is in the Var department in the Provence-Alpes-Côte d'Azur region in South Western France. Founded by Paul Ricard and Alain Bombard, the institute receives 25,000 visitors annually, and produces films and exhibitions to highlight marine life and issues.

In an early case of industrial pollution in the Mediterranean Sea, "red mud" was discharged at sea off the coast of the town of Cassis in Southern France. Industrialist Paul Ricard campaigned against the pollution, and in 1966 founded the Observatoire de la Mer, which later became the Paul Ricard Oceanographic Institute.

The public aquarium at the institute was opened in 1973, it was the third aquarium on France’s Mediterranean coast. A research team was also created at the institute in 1973. An Urban Waste Treatment Plan for the Provence-Alpes-Côte d'Azur coastline was inspired by a film made by the institute in 1980, Pollutions et nuisances sur le littoral méditerranéen. The institute helped develop a product to treat oil slicks in 1981, this was used on beaches in Alaska in 1989, and in 1995 the institute was awarded the Grand prix de l’Académie des Sciences for its work.

The institute is currently studying the fin whale with the French branch of the World Wide Fund for Nature, and researching the quality of coastal waters, with the monitoring of underwater ecosystems within the Natura 2000 scheme. In addition the institute also studies the reproduction of the sea horse, the sea urchin, the Mediterranean pen shell, and has studied the impact of desalination of sea water.
