= Louis Blancard =

French archivist and numismatist

Louis Blancard (22 September 1831, Marseille – 27 October 1902, Marseille, aged 71) was a 19th-century French archivist and numismatist.

He was elected a member of the Académie de Marseille on 18 April 1861 of which he would be perpetual secretary from 1889 until his death in 1902.

== Some works ==
- 1861: Éloge de M. Gabriel Jourdan,... Discours de réception à l'Académie impériale de Marseille, prononcé... le 7 juillet 1861
- 1868: Louis Blancard. Essai sur les monnaies de Charles Ier, comte de Provence (in French). Paris: Librairie de J-B. Dumoulin.
- 1884–85: Documents inédits sur le commerce de Marseille au Moyen Age : contrats commerciaux du XIII° siècle
- 1882: Louis Blancard. Le trésor d'Auriol et les dieux nègres de la Grèce (in French). Aix-en-Provence: Achille Makaire.
- 1896: De l'existence simultanée de Guillaume, marie d'Arsinde, et Guillaume, mari d'Adélaïde, comtes de Provence au Xe siècle

== Bibliography ==
- Jean Chélini; Félix Reynaud; Madeleine Villard; Académie de Marseille (2001). Dictionnaire des marseillais. Marseille: Édisud. p. 57. ISBN 2-7449-0254-3..
- Joseph Fournier; Auguste Rampal; Étienne Martin (1926). Deux siècles d'histoire académique (1726-1926);Notice publiée à l'occasion du bi-centenaire de l'Académie (in French). Marseille: Académie des sciences, lettres et beaux-arts de Marseille. pp. 142–144..
