= Garsenda I of Forcalquier =

Daughter of William of Urgell

Garsenda I of Forcalquier (died before 1193) was the wife of Rainou of Sabran and the mother of Garsenda (II), Countess of Forcalquier. Her father was William of Urgell, Count of Forcalquier and her mother was Adelaide of Béziers, daughter of Raymond I Trencavel, Viscount of Agde and Béziers and his wife, Saura of Carcassonne.

It is noted in historical documentation that from 1144 to 1152, Garsenda was involved in a land dispute with the church (opposition led by Guillaume of Bénévent, Archbishop of Embrun) regarding transfer of ownership of edifices in Manosque and Toute Aures. Garsenda, along with other nobility, sought to keep the land within her family following the death of her uncle Bertrand II. It was ruled by the courts that the castles would be shared among the monks and counts of the municipality, with her mother's family making a donation to the monastery.

== Sources ==
- Miret i Sans, Joaquim (1902). "La casa de Montcada en el Vizcondado de Bearn". Boletín de la Real Academia de Buenas Letras de Barcelona (in Catalan). 1 (6): 280–303.
- Varano, Mariacristina (2011). Espace religieux et espace politique en pays provençal au Moyen Âge (PDF) (in French). L'exemple de Forcalquier et de sa région, thèse soutenue à l'université d'Aix-Marseille I.
