= Garsenda, Countess of Forcalquier =

Garsenda
- Countess of Provence; Countess of Forcalquier
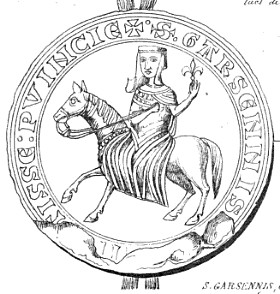
- Garsenda as she appears on her seal, from drawing by Louis Blancard (1860)
- Born: c. 1180
- Died: c. 1242/1257
- Spouse: Alfonso II, Count of Provence
- Issue: Ramon Berenguer V Garsenda of Provence, Viscountess of Béarn
- House: Sabran
- Father: Rainou of Sabran
- Mother: Garsenda I of Forcalquier

Garsenda (French: Garsende; c. 1180 – c. 1242/1257) was the Countess of Provence as the wife of Alfonso II from 1193 and the Countess of Forcalquier in her own right from 1209, which was subsequently united with that of Provence. She was also a patron of Occitan literature, especially the troubadours, and herself wrote some lyric poetry and is counted among the trobairitz as Garsenda de Proensa. She was, in the words of her most recent editors, "one of the most powerful women in Occitan history".

== Early life and marriage ==
Garsenda was the daughter of Rainou (or Rénier), lord of Caylar and Ansouis of the House of Sabran, and Garsenda, daughter of William IV of Forcalquier. She was named after her mother, who was the heiress of William IV, but predeceased him. Garsenda therefore inherited Forcalquier from her grandfather. She was only thirteen years of age when, in 1193, her grandfather William IV and Alfonso II signed the Treaty of Aix whereby Garsenda would inherit William's county and would marry Alfonso, who was in line to become Count of Provence. The marriage took place at Aix-en-Provence in July 1193. They had at least two children, Raymond Berengar V and Garsenda, who married Guillermo II de Montcada, and bore him two children, including Gaston VII, Viscount of Béarn.

== Regency and patronage ==
In 1209, both William IV and Alfonso died and Garsenda became the natural guardian of their son and heir, Raymond Berengar V. Initially her brother-in-law, Peter II of Aragon, assigned the regency of Provence to his brother Sancho, but when Peter died in 1213 Sancho became regent of Aragon and passed Provence and Forcalquier to his son Nuño Sánchez. Dissension broke out between the Catalans and the partisans of the countess, who accused Nuño of attempting to supplant his nephew in the county. The Provençal aristocracy originally took advantage of the situation for their own ambitious ends, but eventually they lined up behind Garsenda and removed Nuño, who returned to Catalonia. The regency was passed to Garsenda and a regency council was established consisting of the native nobles.

Coat of arms of the Sabran family, as used by William and Rostaing, hereditary constables of the County of Toulouse (late 12th century)

It was probably during her regency (1209/1213 – 1217/1220) that Garsenda became the focus of a literary circle of poets, though the vida of Elias de Barjols refers to his patron as Alfonso. There is a tenso between a bona dompna (good lady), identified in one chansonnier as la contessa de Proessa, and an anonymous troubadour. The two coblas of the exchange are found in two different orders in the two chansonniers, called F and T, that preserve them. It cannot be known therefore who spoke first, but the woman's half begins Vos q'em semblatz dels corals amadors. In the poem the countess declares her love for her interlocutor, who then responds courteously but carefully. Under some interpretations the troubadour is Gui de Cavaillon, whose vida repeats the rumour (probably unfounded) that he was the countess' lover. Gui, however, was at the Provençal court between 1200 and 1209, pushing the date of the exchange forward a bit. Elias de Barjols apparently "fell in love" with her as a widow and wrote songs about her "for the rest of his life", until he entered a monastery. Raimon Vidal also praised her renowned patronage of troubadours.

== Retirement and later life ==
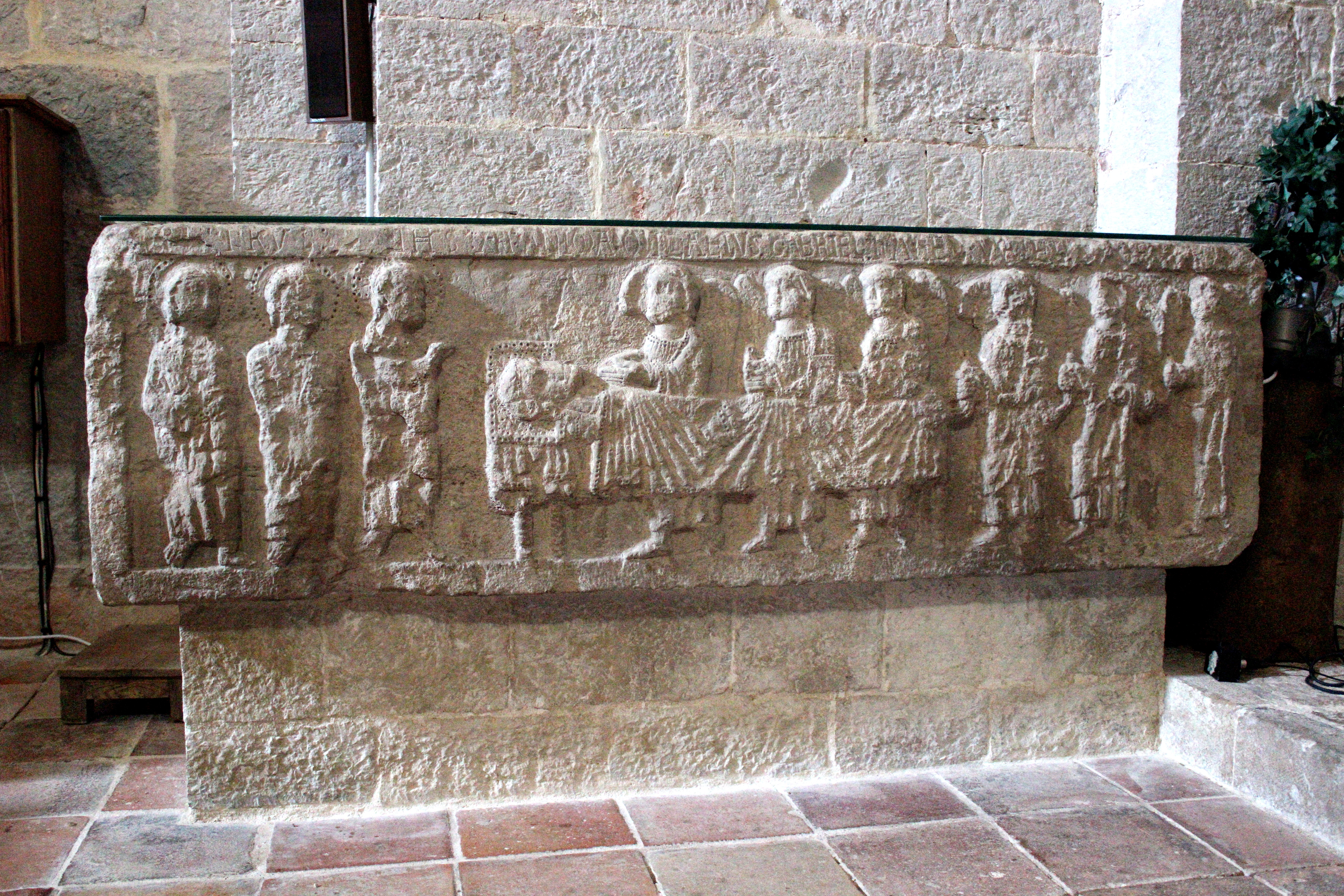
Tomb of Garsenda of Forcalquier, Abbey of La Celle

In 1220, Guillaume II de Sabran, a nephew of William IV, who claimed Forcalquier and had been in revolt in the region of Sisteron, was neutralised in part through the mediation of the Archbishop of Aix, Bermond le Cornu. By 1217 or 1220 Garsenda had finally ceded Forcalquier to her son and handed over the reins of government.

Garsenda retired to the monastery of La Celle around 1225. In 1242, she went to visit her newly born great-granddaughter, Beatrice of England, and her parents in Bordeaux. As the father of infant Beatrice, Henry III of England, was engaged in a war in France at the time, she brought sixty knights to his service. Garsenda may have been alive as late as 1257, when a certain woman of that name made a donation to a church of St-Jean on the condition that three priests be kept to pray for her soul and that of her husband.

== Poetry ==
Vos que.m semblatz dels corals amadors, ja non volgra que fossetz tan doptanz; e platz me molt quar vos destreing m'amors, qu'atressi sui eu per vos malananz. Ez avetz dan en vostre vulpillatge quar no.us ausatz de preiar enardir, e faitz a vos ez a mi gran dampnatge; que ges dompna no ausa descobrir tot so qu'il vol per paor de faillir.	You're so well-suited as a lover, I wish you wouldn't be so hesitant; but I'm glad my love makes you the penitent, otherwise I'd be the one to suffer. Still, in the long run it's you who stands to lose if you're not brave enough to state your case, and you'll do both of us great harm if you refuse. For a lady doesn't dare uncover her true will, lest those around her think her base.

== Sources ==
- Blancard, Louis (1860). Iconographie des sceaux et bulles conservés dans la partie antérieur à 1790 des archives départementales des Bouches-du-Rhone. Vol. 1. Paris: J.-B. Dumoulin.
- Bogin, Meg (1976). The Women Troubadours. Scarborough: Paddington. ISBN 0846701138.
- Bruckner, Matilda Tomaryn; Shepard, Laurie; White, Sarah (1995). Songs of the Women Troubadours. New York: Garland Publishing. ISBN 0815308175.
- Cirera i Prim, Jaume (1954). "Filiación de los Montcada que asistieron a la conquista de Mallorca". Memòries de la Reial Acadèmia Mallorquina d'Estudis Genealògics, Heràldics i Històrics. 2 (1–4): 101–12.
- Constable, Giles (1957). "The Disputed Election at Langres in 1138". Traditio. 13: 119–52. doi:10.1017/S0362152900007947. S2CID 151663893.
- Cox, Eugene L. (1974). The Eagles of Savoy. Princeton, NJ: Princeton University Press. ISBN 0691052166.
- Miret i Sans, Joaquim (1902). "La casa de Montcada en el Vizcondado de Bearn". Boletín de la Real Academia de Buenas Letras de Barcelona. 1 (6): 280–303.
- Shideler, John C. (1983). Medieval Catalan Noble Family: The Montcadas, 1000–1230. University of California Press. ISBN 0520045785.

Regnal titles
Preceded by William IV	Countess of Forcalquier; 7 October 1209 – 1217 or 1220 with Alfonso I (1209)	Succeeded by Ramon Berenguer V
