= Six-Fours-les-Plages =

- Commune
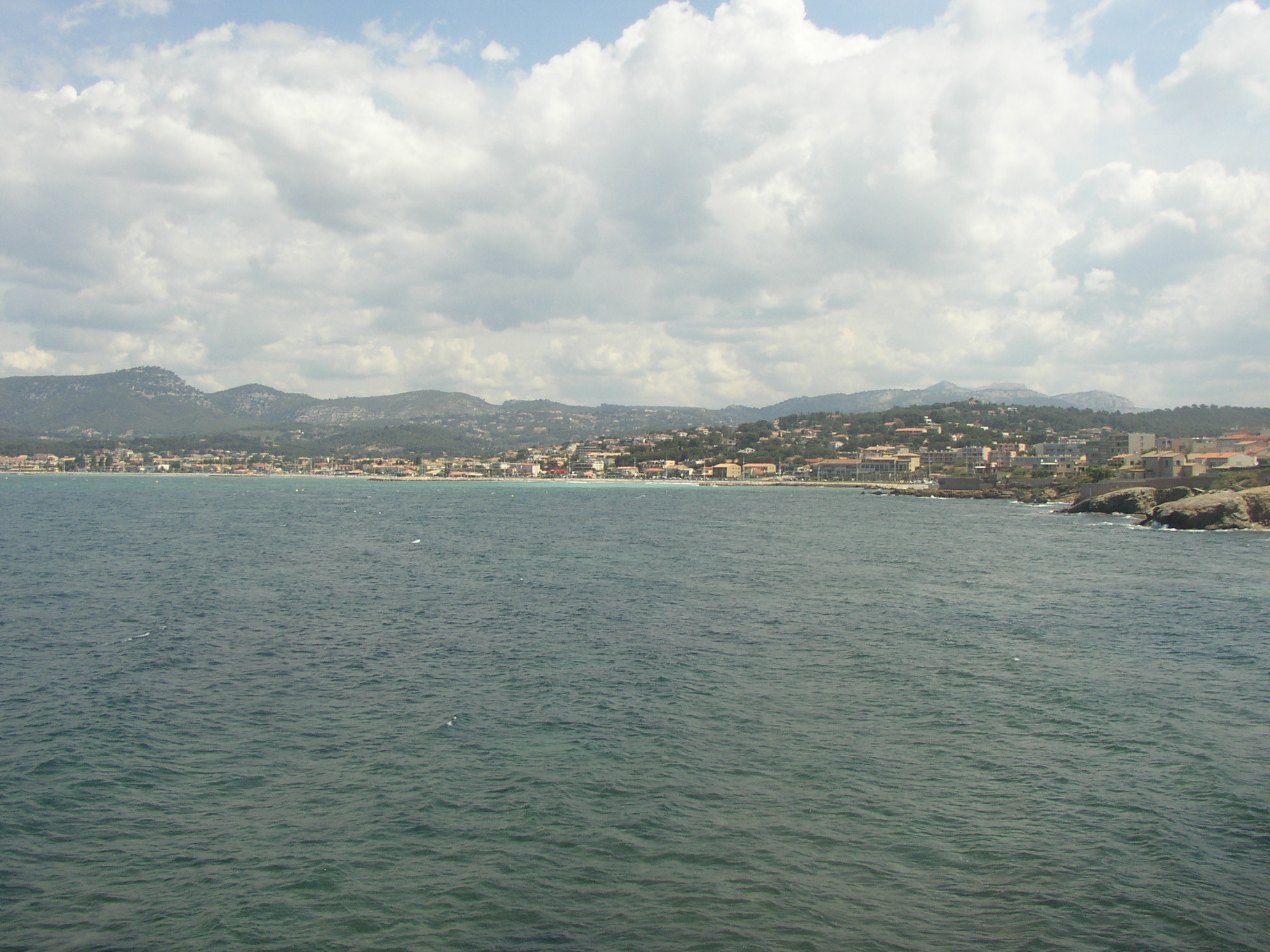
- Six-Fours (and Sanary on the left) seen from Cap Nègre

- Coat of arms
- Location of Six-Fours-les-Plages
- Location within France Location within Provence-Alpes-Côte d'Azur
- Coordinates: 43°06′03″N 5°49′12″E
- Country: France
- Region: Provence-Alpes-Côte d'Azur
- Department: Var
- Arrondissement: Toulon
- Canton: La Seyne-sur-Mer-2
- Intercommunality: Métropole Toulon Provence Méditerranée

Government
  - Mayor (2026–32): Frédéric Boccaletti
- Area^{1}: 26.58 km^{2} (10.26 sq mi)
- Elevation: 234 m (768 ft)
- Highest elevation: 352 m (1,155 ft)
- Lowest elevation: 0 m (0 ft)
- Population (2023): 37,109
  - Density: 1,396/km^{2} (3,616/sq mi)
- Time zone: UTC+01:00 (CET)
  - Summer (DST): UTC+02:00 (CEST)
- INSEE/Postal code: 83129 /83140
- Website: Official website
- ^{1} French Land Register data, which excludes lakes, ponds, glaciers > 1 km^{2} (0.386 sq mi or 247 acres) and river estuaries.

Six-Fours-les-Plages (French pronunciation: [si fuʁ le plaʒ]; Occitan: Sièis Forns lei Plaias, Sièis Four in provençal) is a commune in the Var department in the Provence-Alpes-Côte d'Azur region in southeastern France. Inhabitants of Six-Fours-les-Plages refer to themselves as "Six-Fournais".

It is located in the Métropole Toulon Provence Méditerranée, and is southwest of the main city of Toulon.

== Features ==
The city offers several points of interest. The fort on the hill that dominates the city neighbours an eleventh-century chapel, St Peter "collégiale". There are also nice beaches from the very popular "brutal beach", famous for windsurfing to the secret cove in the Sicié massif. The Île des Embiez is the site of an oceanographic research centre, and the smaller Île Gaou is where concerts are organised every summer.

== Population ==
Historical population

Year	Pop.	±% p.a.
1793	2,423	—
1800	2,600	+1.01%
1806	2,874	+1.68%
1821	2,798	−0.18%
1831	3,081	+0.97%
1836	3,001	−0.52%
1841	1,836	−9.36%
1846	2,910	+9.65%
1851	2,924	+0.10%
1856	2,649	−1.96%
1861	2,805	+1.15%
1866	2,830	+0.18%
1872	2,840	+0.06%
1876	2,981	+1.22%
1881	2,661	−2.25%
1886	2,646	−0.11%
1891	2,771	+0.93%
1896	2,823	+0.37%
1901	3,508	+4.44%

Year	Pop.	±% p.a.
1906	3,238	−1.59%
1911	3,373	+0.82%
1921	3,292	−0.24%
1926	3,730	+2.53%
1931	3,869	+0.73%
1936	4,615	+3.59%
1946	4,750	+0.29%
1954	5,925	+2.80%
1962	9,057	+5.45%
1968	15,118	+8.91%
1975	20,090	+4.15%
1982	25,526	+3.48%
1990	28,957	+1.59%
1999	32,742	+1.37%
2007	35,091	+0.87%
2012	34,057	−0.60%
2017	32,829	−0.73%
2023	37,109	+2.06%

Source: EHESS and INSEE (1968-2023)

== Notable people from Six-Fours-les-Plages ==
- Jean-Claude Mas – founder of Poly Implant Prothèse (PIP), breast implant manufacturer.
- Hélène Ségara – pop singer.

== International relations ==
- Emmendingen, Germany
- Zagarolo, Italy

== See also ==
- Communes of the Var department
