= Pastis =

Anise-flavored liqueur and apéritif

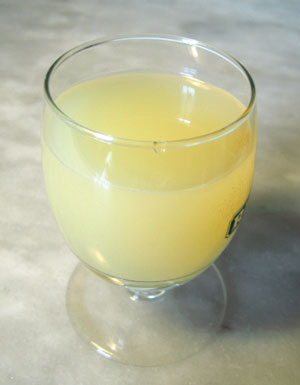
A glass of diluted pastis

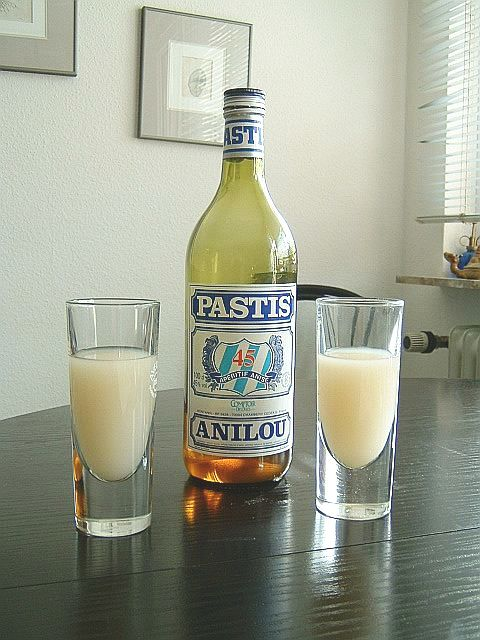
French pastis

Pastis (UK: /ˈpæstɪs/, US: /pæˈstiːs/, French: [pastis]; Occitan: pastís [pasˈtis]) is an anise-flavoured spirit and apéritif traditionally from France, typically containing less than 100 g/L sugar and 40–45% ABV (alcohol by volume).

== Origins ==
Pastis was first commercialized by Paul Ricard in 1932 and remains popular in France, especially in the southeastern regions, mostly Marseille and the departments of the Bouches-du-Rhône and the Var. Pastis emerged about 17 years after the ban on absinthe, when the French nation was still apprehensive about high-proof anise drinks. The popularity of pastis may be attributable to a penchant for anise drinks that was cultivated by absinthe decades earlier, but is also part of an old tradition of Mediterranean anise liquors that includes sambuca, ouzo, arak, rakı, and mastika. The name "pastis" comes from Occitan "pastís," a mash-up or blend.

== Composition ==
By legal definition, pastis is an anise-flavoured spirit that contains additional flavor of liquorice root, contains less than 100 grams of sugar per litre, and is bottled at a minimum of 40% ABV (pastis) or a minimum of 45% ABV (pastis de Marseille). While pastis was originally produced artisanally using whole herbs (as most such spirits were at the time), modern versions are typically made by mixing base alcohol with commercially prepared flavorings (essences or extracts) and caramel coloring.

Pastis is often compared with its historical predecessor, absinthe, yet the two are distinctly different. Pastis was created years after the prohibition of absinthe, and traditionally does not contain grand wormwood (Artemisia absinthium), the herb from which absinthe derives its name. Also, pastis most commonly obtains its anise flavour from star anise, an Asian spice sourced from Vietnam and China, whereas absinthe traditionally obtains its base flavor from a distillation of green anise and fennel, both Mediterranean herbs. Additionally, pastis typically has some degree of licorice-root flavor, which is not traditionally used in absinthe. In terms of bottled strength, traditional absinthes were bottled at 45–74% ABV, while pastis is typically bottled at 40–50% ABV. Finally, whereas traditional absinthe is invariably a dry spirit, pastis may be bottled with sugar.

== Serving ==
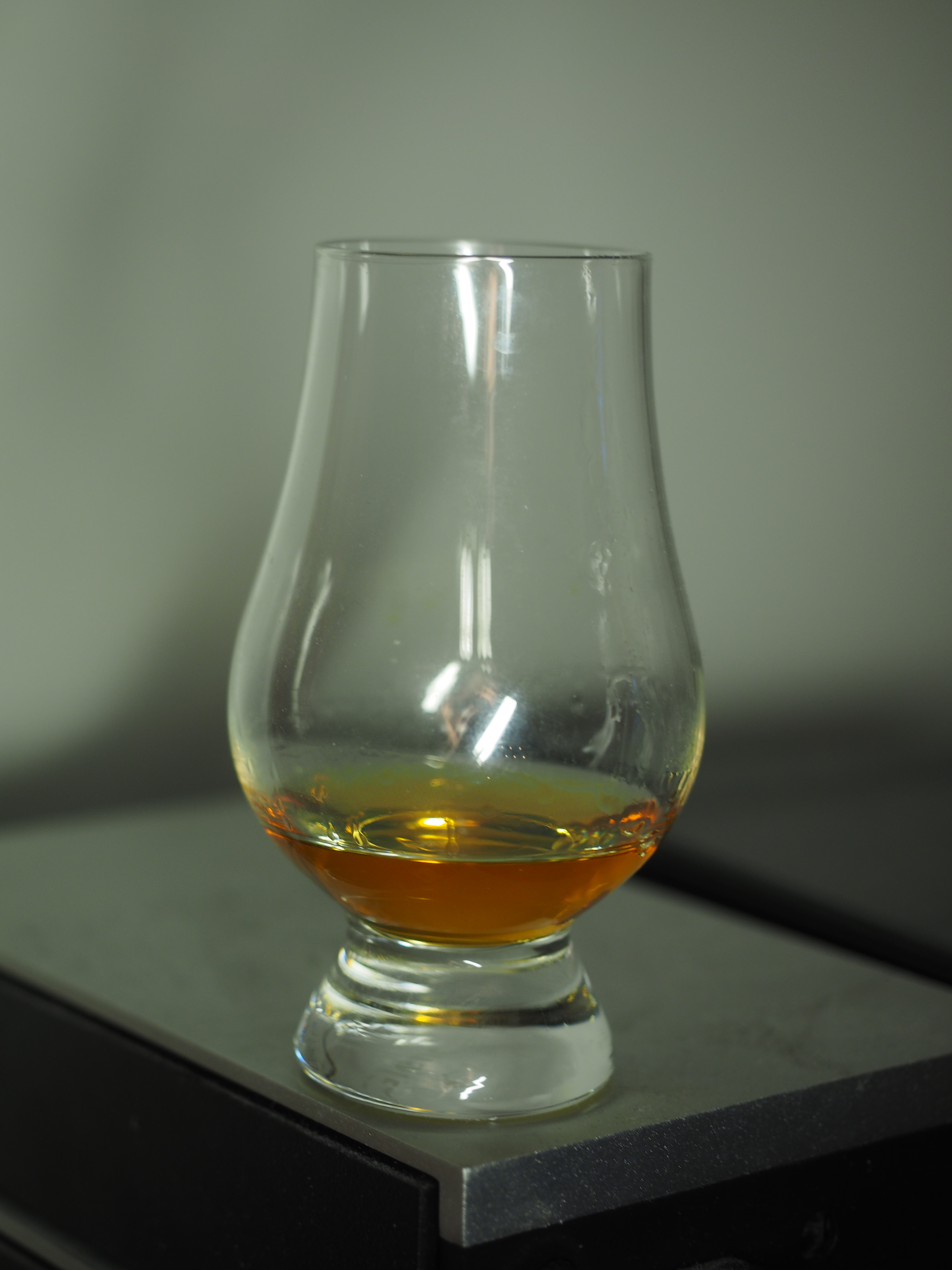
Pastis has a dark transparent yellow color when neat. Diluting it with water changes its color to a milky soft yellow.

Pastis is normally diluted with water before drinking, generally five volumes of water for one volume of pastis, but neat pastis is often served with a jug of water for the drinker to mix to preference. The resulting decrease in alcohol percentage causes some of the constituents to become insoluble, which changes the liqueur's appearance from dark transparent yellow to milky soft yellow, a phenomenon also present with absinthe and known as louche or the ouzo effect. The drink is consumed cold and considered a refreshment for hot days. Ice cubes can be added (after the water, to avoid crystallization of the anethole in the pastis). Many pastis drinkers decline to add ice, preferring to drink the beverage with cool spring water.

Although consumed throughout France, pastis is generally associated with southeastern regions of the country, particularly the city of Marseille, where it is nicknamed Pastaga, and with such clichés of the Provençal lifestyle as pétanque.

130 million litres are sold each year (more than two litres per inhabitant in France).

== Chemistry ==
Pastis beverages become cloudy when diluted because they are anise-based. Such beverages contain oils called terpenes, which are soluble in an aqueous solution containing 30% or more ethanol by volume. When the solution is diluted to below 30% ethanol, the terpenes become insoluble; this causes a dispersion of oil droplets to form in the solution, giving the liquid a cloudy appearance. The same chemistry makes absinthe cloudy when diluted.

== Notable brands ==
- Henri Bardouin made by Distilleries et Domaines de Provence
- Ricard, Pernod, Pastis 51, Pacific made by Pernod Ricard

== See also ==
- Absinthe
- Anisette
- Rakı
