= Midi-Pyrénées =

Former administrative region of France

Coordinates: 43°30′N 1°20′E

- Region of France
- Flag Coat of arms

- Country: France
- Dissolved: 1 January 2016
- Prefecture: Toulouse
- Departments: 8: Ariège (09); Aveyron (12); Gers (32); Haute-Garonne (31); Hautes-Pyrénées (65); Lot (46); Tarn (81); Tarn-et-Garonne (82)

Government
  - President: Martin Malvy (PS)

Area
  - Total: 45,348 km^{2} (17,509 sq mi)

Population (1 January 2012)
  - Total: 2,926,592
  - Density: 64.536/km^{2} (167.15/sq mi)

GDP
  - Total: €123.658 billion (2024)
  - Per capita: €38,547 (2024)
- Time zone: UTC+1 (CET)
  - Summer (DST): UTC+2 (CEST)
- ISO 3166 code: FR-N
- NUTS Region: FR6
- Website: Midi-Pyrenees Region

Midi-Pyrénées (French pronunciation: [midi piʁene]; Occitan: Miègjorn-Pirenèus [mjɛdˈdʒuɾ piɾeˈnɛws] or Mieidia-Pirenèus [mjejˈði.ɔ piɾeˈnɛws]; Spanish: Mediodía-Pirineos) is a former administrative region of France. Since 1 January 2016, it has been part of the new region of Occitania. It was the largest region of Metropolitan France by area, larger than the Netherlands or Denmark.

Midi-Pyrénées has no historical or geographical unity. It is one of the regions of France created in the late 20th century to serve as a hinterland and zone of influence for its capital, Toulouse, one of a handful of so-called "balancing metropolises" (métropoles d'équilibre). Another example of this is the region of Rhône-Alpes which was created as the region for Lyon.

== Geographical composition ==
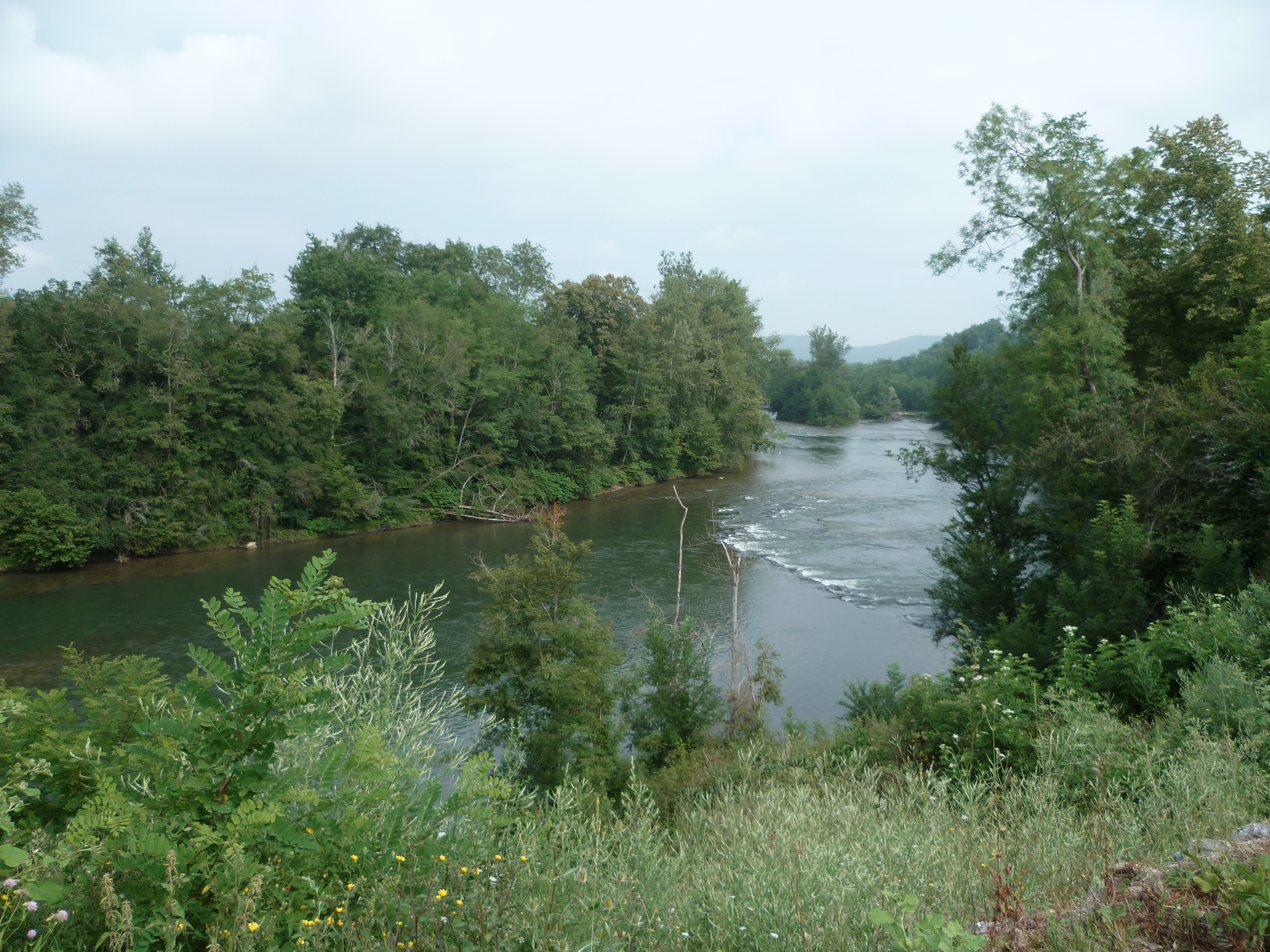
Landscape in Haute-Garonne, Midi-Pyrénées

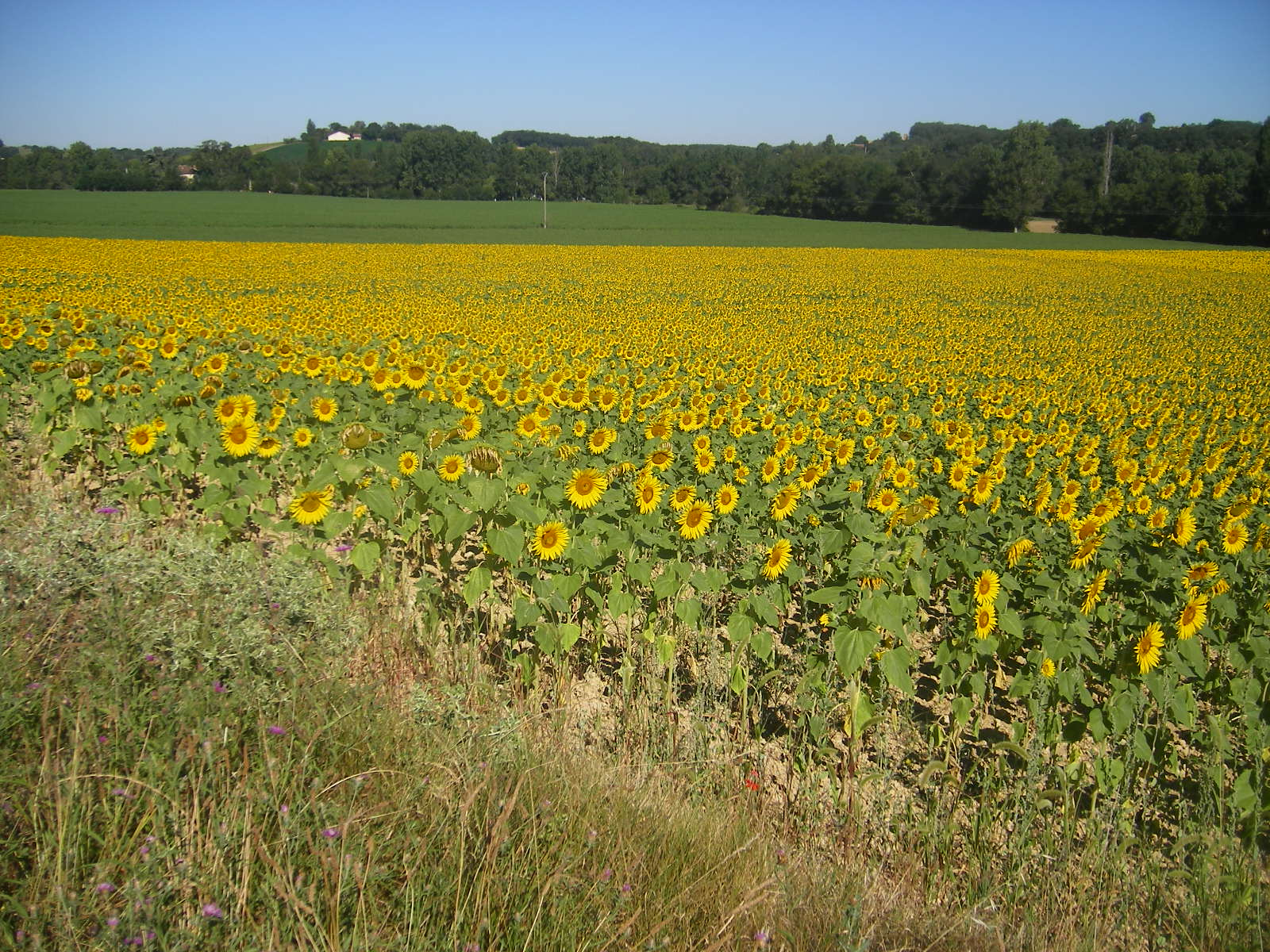
Landscape in Gers, Midi-Pyrénées

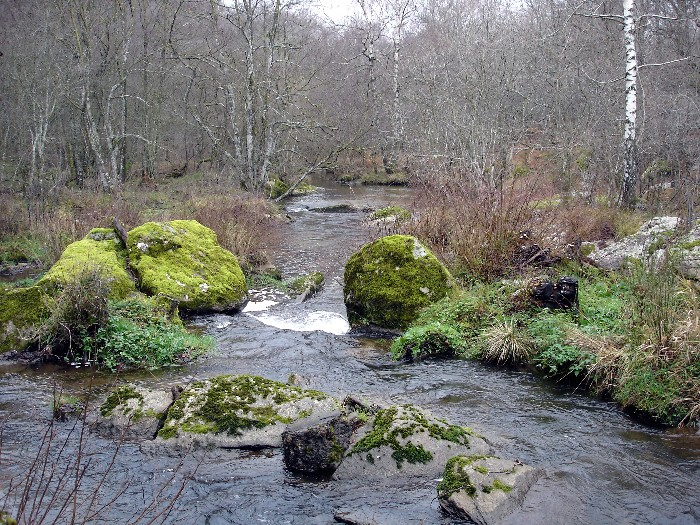
Landscape in Aveyron, Midi-Pyrénées

Historically, Midi-Pyrénées is made up of several former French provinces:

- 24.2% of the Midi-Pyrénées territory formed part of Gascony: western half of Haute-Garonne department, southwest of Tarn-et-Garonne, Gers in its entirety, extreme north of Hautes-Pyrénées. Gascony here includes the province of Comminges, which historically was a Pyrenean province, but later expanded all the way north to Muret in the southern suburbs of Toulouse, then was fragmented, and became an eastern fringe of Gascony. Gascony also extends over the Aquitaine region.
- 23.4% of Midi-Pyrénées was part of Languedoc: the eastern half of Haute-Garonne, southeast of Tarn-et-Garonne, Tarn in its entirety, northwest and northeast of Ariège. Languedoc includes the sub-province of Albigeois (Tarn department), which is sometimes considered as a province separate from Languedoc. Languedoc also extends over the Languedoc-Roussillon region.
- 19.9% of Midi-Pyrénées was formerly Rouergue: Aveyron department in its entirety, and extreme east of Tarn-et-Garonne. The former province of Rouergue lay entirely within the modern Midi-Pyrénées.
- 15.4% of Midi-Pyrénées was Quercy: department of Lot in its entirety, and northern half of Tarn-et-Garonne. The province of Quercy was entirely contained inside Midi-Pyrénées.
- 16.6% of Midi-Pyrénées was a collection of small Pyrenean provinces, from east to west: the County of Foix (eastern half of Ariège), Couserans (western half of Ariège), Nébouzan (extreme south of Haute-Garonne and extreme east of Hautes-Pyrénées), Quatre-Vallées (i.e. "Four Valleys") (east of Hautes-Pyrénées), and Bigorre (west and center of Hautes-Pyrénées). All these provinces are entirely contained inside Midi-Pyrénées.
- 0.5% of Midi-Pyrénées is Agenais: extreme west of Tarn-et-Garonne. Agenais extends essentially over the Aquitaine region.

The historical makeup of Midi-Pyrénées is even more complex, as the provinces listed here are further subdivided into pays–used interchangeably in French for country, area, land, etc.–each with its own particular identity, such as Armagnac, Astarac, or Lomagne inside the Gascogne part of Midi-Pyrénées, Lauragais or Volvestre inside the Languedoc part of Midi-Pyrénées, Bonezan inside County of Foix, Lavedan inside Bigorre, and so on.

The Pyrenean provinces of Couserans, Nébouzan, Quatre-Vallées, and Bigorre (but not the County of Foix) are sometimes considered to be part of Gascony. These provinces were all formed from the old Roman province of Novempopulana, later known as Vasconia (because of the Basque influence), and later as Gascony, from which they seceded over time. Furthermore, after the 16th century these Pyrenean provinces were made part of the military region of Gascony, and later in the 18th century they were ruled from Auch by the intendant of Auch, as with the rest of Gascony. If these Pyrenean provinces are included inside Gascony, then 35.4% of Midi-Pyrénées is Gascony, outweighing Languedoc and its 23.4%.

This point is still a matter of debate. The Pyrenean provinces developed strong peculiarities over time, protected by their isolated valleys, and they looked quite distinct from the rest of Gascony. What's more, Bigorre, Quatre-Vallées, Nébouzan, and even Comminges kept their provincial states until the French Revolution, while Gascony had no provincial states. These Pyrenean provinces sent their representatives to the Estates-General of 1789 in Versailles at the beginning of the Revolution, whereas the various other parts of Gascony sent their own representatives.

In demographic terms, given the overwhelming demographic weight of Toulouse (located in the historical Languedoc), the majority of the inhabitants of Midi-Pyrénées live in the Languedoc part of Midi-Pyrénées. As a matter of fact, the historical flag of Languedoc, the Occitan cross, was adopted as the official flag of the Midi-Pyrénées region by the regional council. This historic flag design is itself derived from the coat of arms of the old county of Toulouse.

== Merger with Languedoc-Roussillon ==
The administrative division of France is currently in debate. Many think that the communes are too small and should be merged, that the departments are outdated and should disappear, and that the regions are too small and too numerous (22 in metropolitan France) and should be merged. Regarding Midi-Pyrénées, there are two thoughts:

- There are those who stress the Aquitainian nature of Midi-Pyrénées, often referring to Midi-Pyrénées as being mostly made up of Gascony, minimizing the importance of Languedoc in the region. The Midi-Pyrénées and Aquitaine regions share a common destiny it is explained, linked by the Garonne River, and were artificially separated. It is thus proposed to merge the two regions into a large region of southwest France. There have even been talks about building a single international airport of southwest France that would be located half-way between Toulouse and Bordeaux (capital of the Aquitaine region), which are 240 km. (150 miles) from each other. Without entering the debate over whether such a distant airport would make any sense at all, it is quite clear that merging both regions would create strong rivalries between Toulouse and Bordeaux, which are economic competitors, and the almost impossible task of choosing which of the two cities should become the capital of the new region.
- On the other hand, there are those who stress the past of Toulouse, referring to the former County of Toulouse which extended to the Mediterranean Coast, and who would like to merge Midi-Pyrénées with Languedoc-Roussillon in order to create a large Languedoc region. This indeed would reunify the old province of Languedoc, which was split between Midi-Pyrénées and Languedoc-Roussillon, and it would also make sense historically speaking, creating a region roughly corresponding to the old county of Toulouse. There also seems to be less economic competition between Toulouse and the cities of Languedoc-Roussillon. However, political leaders of Montpellier (capital of Languedoc-Roussillon) may disagree with the merger, opposed to losing their status of regional capital in favor of Toulouse, and loath to have Toulouse dominate the Mediterranean coast after it has dominated Midi-Pyrénées for more than 30 years already. Also, people in Roussillon, with their distinct Catalan culture, might object to being incorporated into a very large Languedoc region where their identity could become diluted.

On 1 January 2016, the region was merged with Languedoc-Roussillon to form the new region of Occitanie. The new name was taken up on 28 September 2016, with the capital remaining at Toulouse. Thus the debate ended in the second argument being accepted by the National Assembly and the Senate.

== See also ==
- County of Toulouse
- Languedoc
