= Canon Alberic's Scrap-Book =

"Canon Alberic's Scrap-book"
- Short story by M.R. James
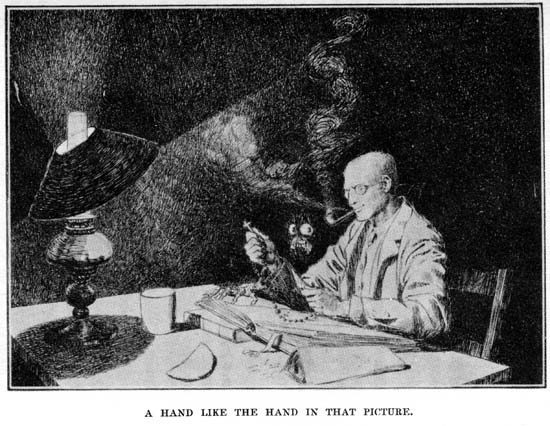
- "A hand like the hand in that picture". An illustration by M. R. James' friend James McBryde, from the first edition of Ghost Stories of an Antiquary. The figure of Dennistoun was based on M. R. James.

Text available at Wikisource
- Original title: A Curious Book; The Scrap-book of Canon Alberic
- Country: United Kingdom
- Language: English
- Genre: Horror short story

Publication
- Published in: National Review
- Media type: Print (magazine)
- Publication date: 1895

"Canon Alberic's Scrap-Book" is a horror short story by English writer M. R. James, written in 1892 or 1893 and first published in 1895 in the National Review. It is his earliest known horror story and the first (along with "Lost Hearts") to be read aloud to the "Chitchat Society" at King's College, Cambridge, where many of his stories made their public debut. It was subsequently included in his first short story collection, Ghost Stories of an Antiquary (1904), though the malevolent entity is a demon rather than a ghost.

== Plot summary ==
In spring 1883, the English tourist Dennistoun (Note: In the original version of the story, as published in the National Review, the protagonist is named "Anderson".) visits the tiny "decayed" cathedral city of Saint-Bertrand-de-Comminges, at the foot of the Pyrenees in southern France, to photograph Saint-Bertrand-de-Comminges Cathedral. Throughout the day, the elderly sacristan accompanying him is visibly nervous and unwilling to leave Dennistoun alone in the Cathedral. Dennistoun himself hears "curious noises", including a "thin metallic voice laughing high up in the tower". He is puzzled to witness the sacristan kneeling and weeping in front of a painting of Bertrand of Comminges delivering a man from Satan. By five o'clock, as Dennistoun is finishing, the mysterious noises begin to grow "more frequent and insistent", and the sacristan appears impatient to leave.

Noting Dennistoun's interest in the Cathedral's choirbooks, the sacristan invites him to his home to see something he possesses. Upon reaching the house, the sacristan's daughter is visibly relieved to see him; Dennistoun hears him say to her "He was laughing in the church". Once inside, the sacristan unveils a large folio stamped with the arms of Canon Alberic de Mauléon, (Note: An invented character, said to be a collateral descendant of the real 16th-century bishop Jean de Mauléon.) which Dennistoun reckons to date from the late seventeenth century. The folio consists of around 150 leaves of various historic illuminated manuscripts, including extracts from a Book of Genesis from 700 AD or earlier; a full set of pictures from a Psalter dating from the thirteenth century; and 20 leaves of uncial Latin text, which Dennistoun suspects to be writings by Papias of Hierapolis. Dennistoun assumes that Canon Alberic had cut up volumes in the Cathedral's library to create the "priceless" scrap-book.

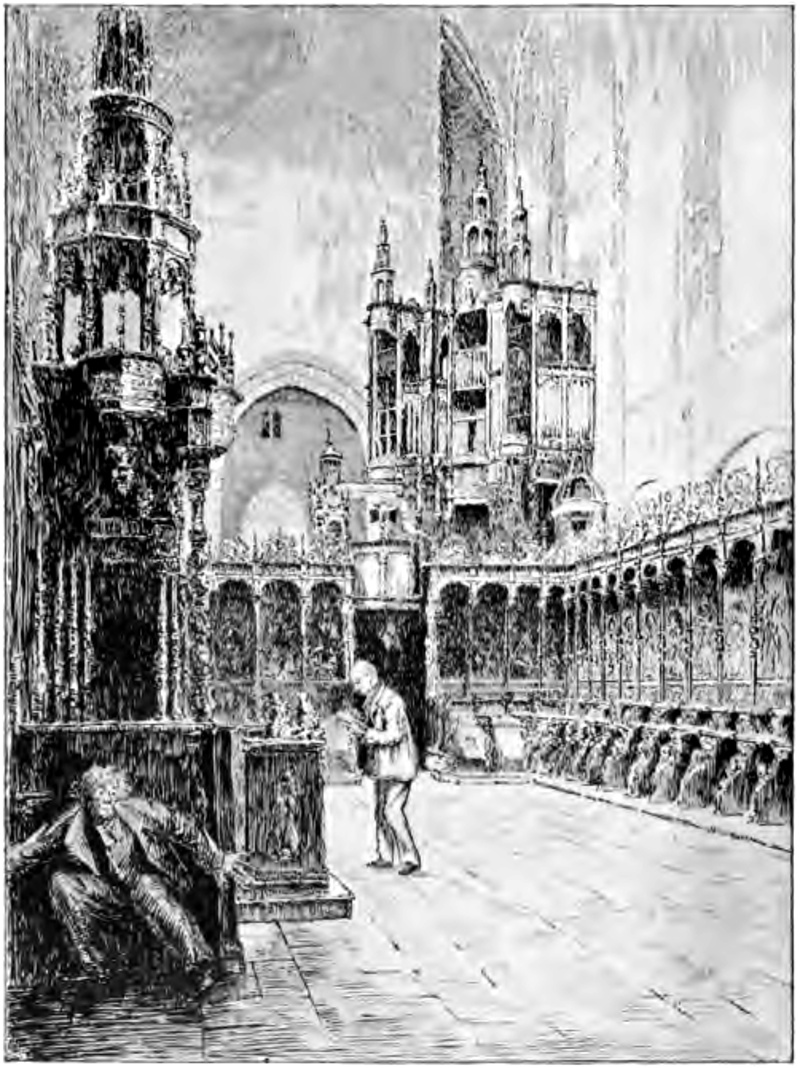
"The Englishman was too deep in his note-book to give more than an occasional glance to the sacristan". An illustration of a scene set within Saint-Bertrand-de-Comminges Cathedral by James' friend James McBryde, which served as the book frontispiece of the first edition of Ghost Stories of an Antiquary. The figure of Dennistoun (centre) was based on M. R. James.

Turning to the end of the book, Dennistoun finds an annotated plan of the south aisle and cloisters of the Cathedral with the words "Responsa 12mi Dec. 1694. Interrogatum est: Inveniamne? Responsum est: Invenies. Fiamne dives? Fies. Vivamne invidendus? Vives. Moriarne in lecto meo? Ita." (Note: Latin: "Answers of the 12th of December, 1694. It was asked: Shall I find it? Answer: Thou shalt. Shall I become rich? Thou wilt. Shall I live an object of envy? Thou wilt. Shall I die in my bed? Thou wilt.") The final page of the book is a sepia drawing from the late seventeenth century depicting King Solomon confronting a terrifying demonic figure, described as having a slender yet muscular body covered in coarse black hair, taloned hands and hateful yellow eyes; it is compared to "one of the awful bird-catching spiders of South America translated into human form, and endowed with intelligence just less than human".

Recovering from the fright the drawing has given him, Dennistoun is determined to buy the "priceless" scrap-book; the sacristan insists on selling it for 250 francs, far below its true value. Once the sale is complete, the sacristan immediately appears more cheerful. The sacristan repeatedly asks to accompany Dennistoun back to his hotel; after he declines the offer, the sacristan's daughter insists on giving him a silver crucifix, which he wears around his neck.

Returning to his hotel bedroom, Dennistoun continues to examine the scrap-book, while feeling a sense of discomfort and a conviction that someone is standing behind him. He hears a strange laugh, which he ascribes to the landlady. Taking off the crucifix and laying it on the table, he suddenly sees next to his elbow a black haired hand. Turning around, he sees the demonic figure from the drawing standing before him. Filled with fear and loathing, Dennistoun grasps the crucifix as the figure move towards him. Rushing into the bedroom at the sound of Dennistoun's scream, the inn's serving-men feel an unseen presence push past them; they find Dennistoun unconscious.

The following day, the sacristan comes to the inn; he is unsurprised when the landlady recounts the events of the prior night, saying "I have seen him myself" and "Deux fois je l'ai vu; mille fois je l'ai senti." (Note: French: "Twice I saw it; a thousand times I felt it.") The narrator reveals that he died that summer.

Dennistoun finds that the back of the picture bears writing from Canon Alberic, who the Gallia Christiana notes died on 31 December 1701 "in bed, of a sudden seizure."

"Contradictio Salomonis cum demonio nocturno.
Albericus de Mauleone delineavit.
V. Deus in adiutorium. Ps. Qui habitat.
Sancte Bertrande, demoniorum effugator, intercede pro me miserrimo.
Primum uidi nocte 12mi Dec 1694: uidebo mox ultimum. Peccaui et passus sum, plura adhuc passurus. Dec. 29, 1701" (Note: Latin: "The Dispute of Solomon with a demon of the night. Drawn by Alberic de Mauléon. Versicle. O Lord, make haste to help me. Psalm. Whoso dwelleth (xci.). Saint Bertrand, who puttest devils to flight, pray for me most unhappy. I saw it first on the night of Dec. 12, 1694: soon I shall see it for the last time. I have sinned and suffered, and have more to suffer yet. Dec. 29, 1701.")

Reflecting on the incident, Dennistoun refers to Ecclesiasticus 39:28 ("Some spirits there be that are created for vengeance, and in their fury lay on sore strokes.") and Isaiah 13 (which describes "night monsters" living in the ruins of Babylon), saying "These things are rather beyond us at present." Visiting Comminges to see Canon Alberic's tomb, he remarks "I hope it isn't wrong: you know I am a Presbyterian—but I—I believe there will be 'saying of Mass and singing of dirges' for Alberic de Mauléon's rest [...] I had no notion they came so dear." He deposits the scrap-book in the Wentworth Collection at the University of Cambridge, but burns the drawing after first taking a photograph.

== Publication ==
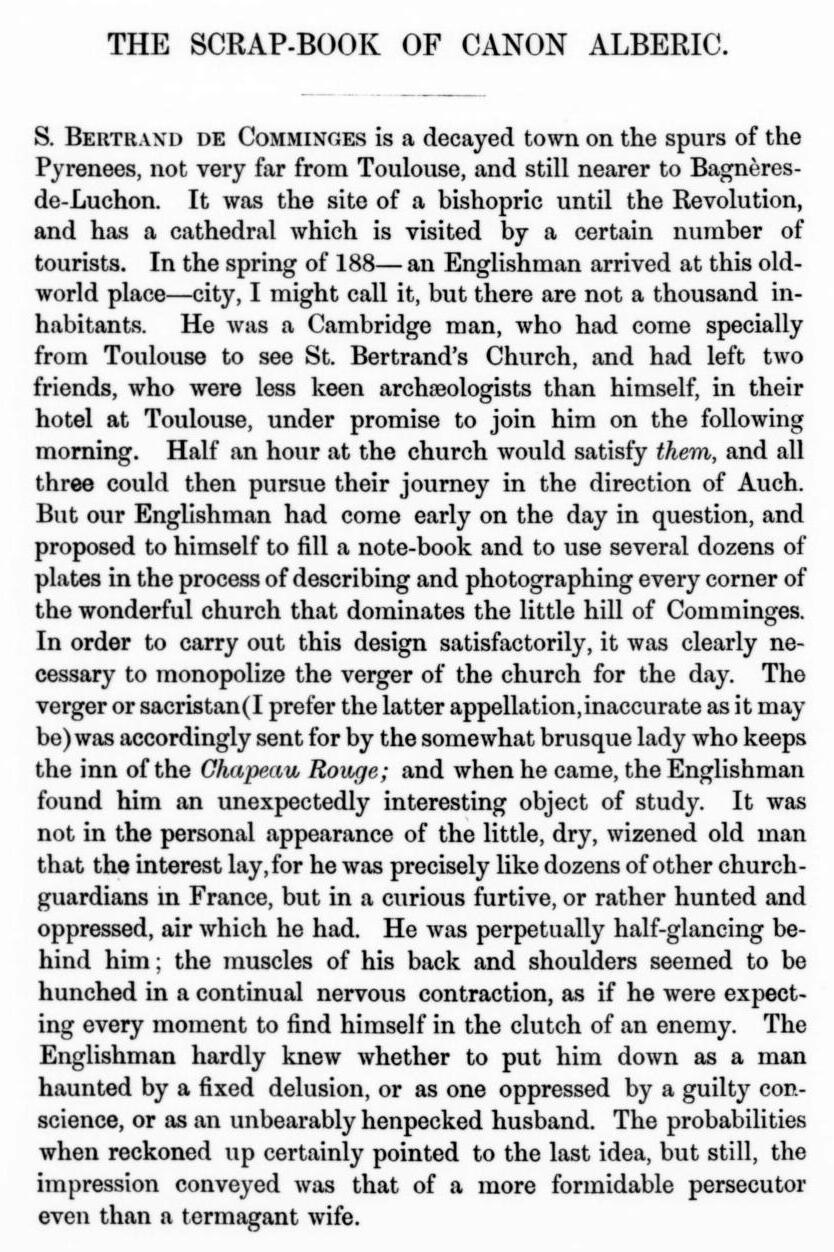
The first page of the story as it appears in the National Review under its original title, "The Scrap-book of Canon Alberic".

"Canon Alberic's Scrap-Book" was written in 1892-1893. On 28 October 1893, James read it to the Chit-Chat Club at the University of Cambridge. It was first published in volume XXV, number 145 of the National Review in March 1895 under the title "The Scrap-book of Canon Alberic" where the protagonist was named Anderson. It was subsequently collected in Ghost Stories of an Antiquary under its final title in 1904, and in The Collected Ghost Stories of M. R. James in 1931. It has been anthologised many times. Its original title was "A Curious Book".

The character of Dennistoun is named after James Dennistoun (1803–1855), a compiler of manuscript fragments.

== Reception ==
S. T. Joshi describes "Canon Alberic's Scrap-Book" as "a prototypical Jamesian ghost story in its depiction of an antiquarian who stumbles upon the supernatural in the course of his researches" and as "unusually autobiographical". Some have considered James' later story "An Episode of Cathedral History" (first published in The Cambridge Review in 1914 and later included in the 1919 collection A Thin Ghost and Others) to be a sequel or companion piece, as it features a similar creature, obliquely suggested to be the mate of the one encountered in "Canon Alberic's Scrap-Book".

Daniel Frampton offers "Canon Alberic's Scrap-Book" as an example of stories by James that "exhibit a supernaturally-charged reality that was 'terrifyingly alive'.", writing "[James'] ghosts are novel in that they are 'embodied terrors' that can be touched."

== Adaptations ==
On 14 October 1954, a television adaptation of "Canon Alberic's Scrapbook" by Tony Richardson aired on BBC Television. The adaptation featured narration by Robert Farquharson with some visual effects.

The story has inspired a musical composition by Kaikhosru Shapurji Sorabji, St. Bertrand de Comminges: "He was laughing in the tower", first performed in 1985 by Yonty Solomon.

On 30 December 1987, BBC Radio 4's programme The Late Book: Ghost Stories featured a reading of "Canon Alberic's Scrap-Book", abridged and produced by Paul Kent and read by Benjamin Whitrow.

In 2006–2007, Nunkie Theatre Company toured A Pleasing Terror round the UK and Ireland. This one-man show was a retelling of two of James's tales, "Canon Alberic's Scrap-Book" and "The Mezzotint".

In 2016, John Reppion and Leah Moore published Ghost Stories of an Antiquary, a graphic novel adaptation of four of James' stories, including "Canon Alberic's Scrap-Book" (illustrated by Aneke).

In 2020, the story was adapted into a full-cast audio drama for the second season of Shadows at the Door: The Podcast.

Episode 211 of Nocturnal Transmissions presented "Canon Alberic's Scrap-Book" as part of the podcast series. NOCTRANS Ep. 211 - Canon Alberic's Scrap-Book

== Translations ==
"Canonici Alberici Codicium" (in Latin, by Alexander Ricius, 2026)

== See also ==
- The Lesser Key of Solomon
- Testament of Solomon
