= Saint Bertrand =

Saint Bertrand or Saint Bertram may refer to:

- Saint Bertechramnus (d. 623), bishop of Le Mans
- Saint Bertrand of Comminges (d. 1123), bishop
- Blessed Bertrand of Grandselve (d. 1149), abbot of Grandselve Abbey
- Blessed Bertrand de Garrigues (d. 1230), companion of Saint Dominic
- Blessed Bertrand of Saint-Geniès (d. 1350), patriarch of Aquileia

== See also ==
- Saint-Bertrand-de-Comminges
