= Arboretum de Cardeilhac =

Arboretum in Midi-Pyrénées, France

Coordinates: 43.177°N 0.639°E

The Arboretum de Cardeilhac (13 hectares) is an arboretum located on the Chemin départemental 69E within a substantial forest (1000 hectares) in Cardeilhac, Haute-Garonne, Midi-Pyrénées, France. It is open several days per week.

The arboretum was created in 1914 for experimental trials of tree species for forestation of the Pyrenees foothills, but is now used for education and recreation. It contains hundreds of species from around the world, with 13 km of marked paths and 17 km of riding trails. The Arboretum House, located at its entrance, provides a space for exhibitions, conferences, and events.

== See also ==
- List of botanical gardens in France
