= Nicolas Hazard =

French entrepreneur (born 1982)

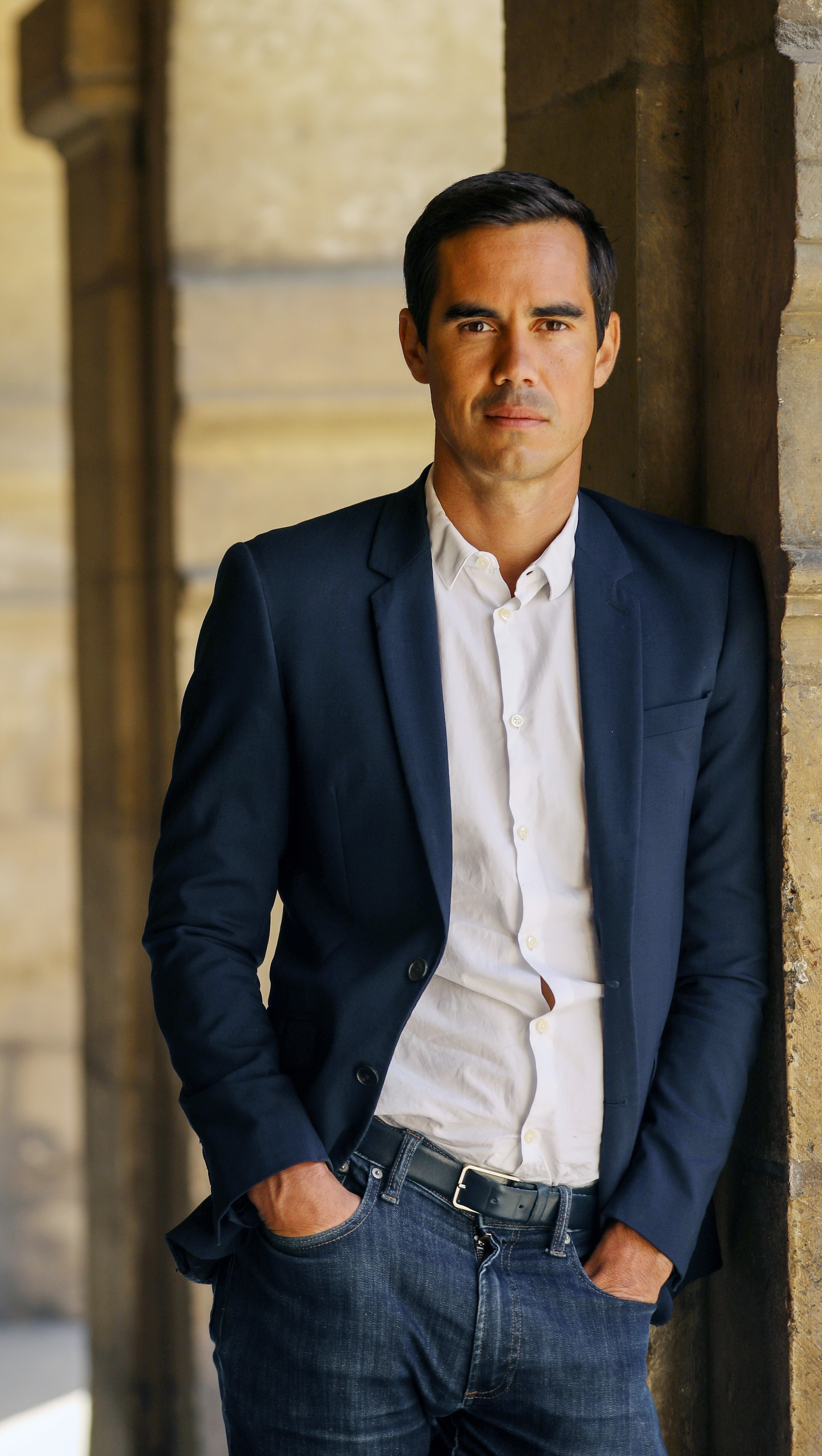
- Born: 15 April 1982 (age 43); France
- Education: Sciences Po Paris; HEC Paris; Sorbonne University; Freie Universität

Nicolas Hazard is a French entrepreneur and the founder and chairman of INCO.

== Biography ==
=== Education ===
Nicolas Hazard graduated from HEC Paris and earned a Master in Public Affairs degree from Sciences-Po Paris.

=== Entrepreneur ===
Nicolas Hazard advocates for the development of a new economy that is environmentally sustainable and socially responsible. In 2011, he founded the Comptoir de l'Innovation, the first impact fund in France, which has invested in over 120 social enterprises across the country. Additionally, he created the INCO group, which acquired the Comptoir de l'Innovation in 2017, and expanded its operations to 150 countries with the aim of creating a new, inclusive, and sustainable economy. Through investment activities (INCO Ventures), incubation (INCO Incubators), and training for future jobs aimed at vulnerable populations (INCO Academy), the group has become one of the global leaders in social entrepreneurship.

In 2012, Nicolas Hazard created Impact², known as the "Davos" of social entrepreneurship, which is now held every year at the City Hall in Paris and hosts more than 1,500 economic and political leaders, from 50 countries.

In 2016, he founded CALSO, INCO's local subsidiary in the United States, with the objective of bringing French social expertise to the US, particularly through the creation of social enterprises. He implemented training and support programs for former inmates to help them work in the kitchens of tech giants like Google. Additionally, he developed a drone pilot training program for unemployed veterans.

In addition, Nicolas Hazard is committed to those who wish to make positive change within their local communities. He has developed and launched a network of co-working and incubator spaces to allow solutions from rural areas to scale-up for global impact. In 2020, the first « Residence » was launched in Saint-Bertrand-de-Comminges.

=== Special advisor ===
Since July 2020, Nicolas Hazard has been special adviser in charge of the social and solidarity economy at the European Commission, reporting to President Ursula Van der Leyen and Commissioner for Employment and Social Rights Nicolas Schmit.

In 2018, he worked with Professor Muhammad Yunus to implement a social business program. He advised Benoît Hamon on entrepreneurship for his 2017 presidential campaign, and launched the first training program for drone pilots alongside Valérie Pécresse in partnership with the Île-de-France region. He has also worked alongside Alain Juppé, Romano Prodi and Hillary Clinton.

== Awards ==
- Young Global Leader in 2015 by the World Economic Forum
- Young Global Leader by the French American Foundation in 2016
- Young Global Leader by the Franco British Foundation in 2017
- 2017 SXSW Community Service Awards Honorees

== Publications ==
- Capitalism for all, 20 enterprises that change the world, Edit the World, 2013
- L'entreprise du XXIe siècle sera sociale ou ne sera pas, Rue de l'échiquier Editions, 2012
- La Ruée des Licornes, Lemieux Editions, 2017
- Appel à la guérilla mondiale, Débats Publics Editions, 2019
- Le bonheur est dans le village : 30 solutions qui viennent de nos campagnes, Flammarion Editions, 2021

Nicolas Hazard regularly contributes to the daily French newspaper Le Monde, as well as the Guardian and the Stanford Social Innovation Review.
