= Bigorre =

Region and former province of France

Map of Bigorre

Bigorre (French pronunciation: [biɡɔʁ]; Gascon: Bigòrra) is a region in southwest France, historically an independent county and later a French province, located in the upper watershed of the Adour, on the northern slopes of the Pyrenees, part of the larger region known as Gascony. Today Bigorre comprises the centre and west of the département of Hautes-Pyrénées, with two small exclaves in the neighbouring Pyrénées Atlantiques. Its inhabitants are called Bigourdans.

== Area and population ==
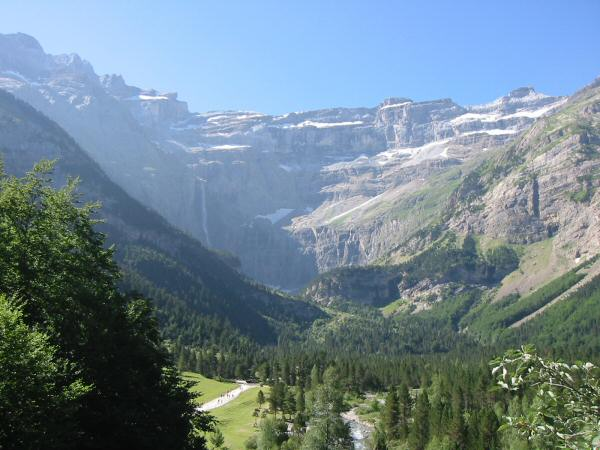
The famous Cirque de Gavarnie, in the very south of Bigorre, with the 442 meters (1,450 ft) Gavarnie waterfall visible in the background

Before the French Revolution, the province of Bigorre had a land area of 2,574 km^{2} (994 sq. miles). Its capital was Tarbes. At the 1999 French census, there lived 177,575 inhabitants on the territory of the former province of Bigorre, which means a density of 69 inh. per km^{2} (179 inh. per sq. mile). The largest urban areas in Bigorre are Tarbes, with 77,414 inhabitants in 1999, Lourdes, with 15,554 inhabitants in 1999, and Bagnères-de-Bigorre, with 11,396 inhabitants in 1999.

== Geography ==
Geographically, Bigorre consists of two distinct areas: the plains to the north around Tarbes rising into the foothills and the high mountain slopes to the south, rising to the Pic du Midi de Bigorre, with the mineral spa of Bagnères-de-Bigorre at its foot. Although Tarbes is the capital of Hautes-Pyrénées, the nearby town of Lourdes has eclipsed it in fame since the apparitions of the Blessed Virgin Mary in 1858, becoming the largest modern pilgrimage center of Western Europe: 12 million people visit the religious shrines annually.

== Early history ==
At the time of the Roman conquest, the area of Bigorre was inhabited by the Bigorri or Bigerri, who gave their name to the region. The Bigorri were probably speakers of Aquitanian, a language possibly related to Basque.

Bigorre was conquered by the Roman general Julius Caesar in 56 BC and incorporated into the province of Gallia Aquitania. In the fourth century, Aquitania was divided in three, for administration; the region that became Bigorre was part of the southernmost section, Aquitania tertia or Novempopulana.

Like the rest of Aquitaine, Bigorre was subsumed within the Visigothic kingdom during the fifth century. After the Battle of Vouillé (507), where the Franks defeated the Visigoths and forced them out of Aquitaine, Bigorre became part of the Frankish kingdom, usually held by the same king who controlled Toulouse. Under the Merovingian kings, Bigorre was a civitas (Latin Begorra), the chief settlement of which was Cieutat. It was part of the morganegyba of Galsuintha from her husband, Chilperic I. On Galsuintha's murder it passed to her sister Brunhilda as part of the arbitration imposed by Guntram of Burgundy. By the Treaty of Andelot (587) Guntram acquired possession of it and it remained with Burgundy until the reunion of various Frankish kingdoms in 613.

The history of Bigorre in the seventh and eighth centuries is obscure. It was apparently part of the Basque Duchy of Gascony which was often at odds with the Frankish Duchy of Aquitaine. The County of Bigorre was formed by the Dukes of Gascony in the ninth century and inherited by scions of the ducal house in the tenth. It remained semi-independent of ducal authority throughout the next two centuries, and was briefly attached to the Viscounty of Béarn (1080–1097). Thereafter the Counts of Bigorre, notable participants in the Reconquista, the Crusades, and the war against the Cathars, strongly asserted their independence, though on a few occasions they prudently acknowledged the suzerainty of another; as of Alfonso II of Aragon in 1187. Henry Plantagenet gained nominal control of the county of Bigorre due to his marriage to Eleanor of Aquitaine in 1184.

== County of Foix ==
Confiscated in 1292 by King Philip IV of France who intervened in a quarrel over the succession of Bigorre, the area was surrendered to Edward III of England by virtue of the Treaty of Brétigny (1360), which marked the end of the first phase of the Hundred Years' War. Recaptured by the French and their allies the counts of Foix between 1370 and 1406, Bigorre was granted by King Charles VII of France to Count Jean I of Foix in 1426. Thus, Bigorre was incorporated into the estates of the House of Foix-Grailly, which included the county of Foix, Béarn, and Nébouzan.

== French crown land ==
Map of France in 1477; the County of Bigorre is visible in the southwest.

Later, the estates of the House of Foix-Béarn passed through heiresses to the House of Albret, then eventually to the House of Bourbon with Henry III of Navarre, son of Antoine de Bourbon and Jeanne d'Albret. Henry III of Navarre became King Henry IV of France in 1589. In 1607, he united to the French crown those of his personal fiefs that were under French sovereignty (i.e. County of Foix, Bigorre, Quatre-Vallées, and Nébouzan, but not Béarn and Lower Navarre, which were sovereign countries outside of the kingdom of France), and so Bigorre became part of the royal domain.

Before the French Revolution, Bigorre was made part of the gouvernement (military area) of Guienne-Gascony, whereas for general matters it depended from the généralité of Auch like the rest of Gascony (although for a certain period of time it depended from the généralité of Pau, like Béarn, Nébouzan, County of Foix, and the Basque provinces). For judicial matters, Bigorre depended from the Parlement of Toulouse.

== French revolution ==
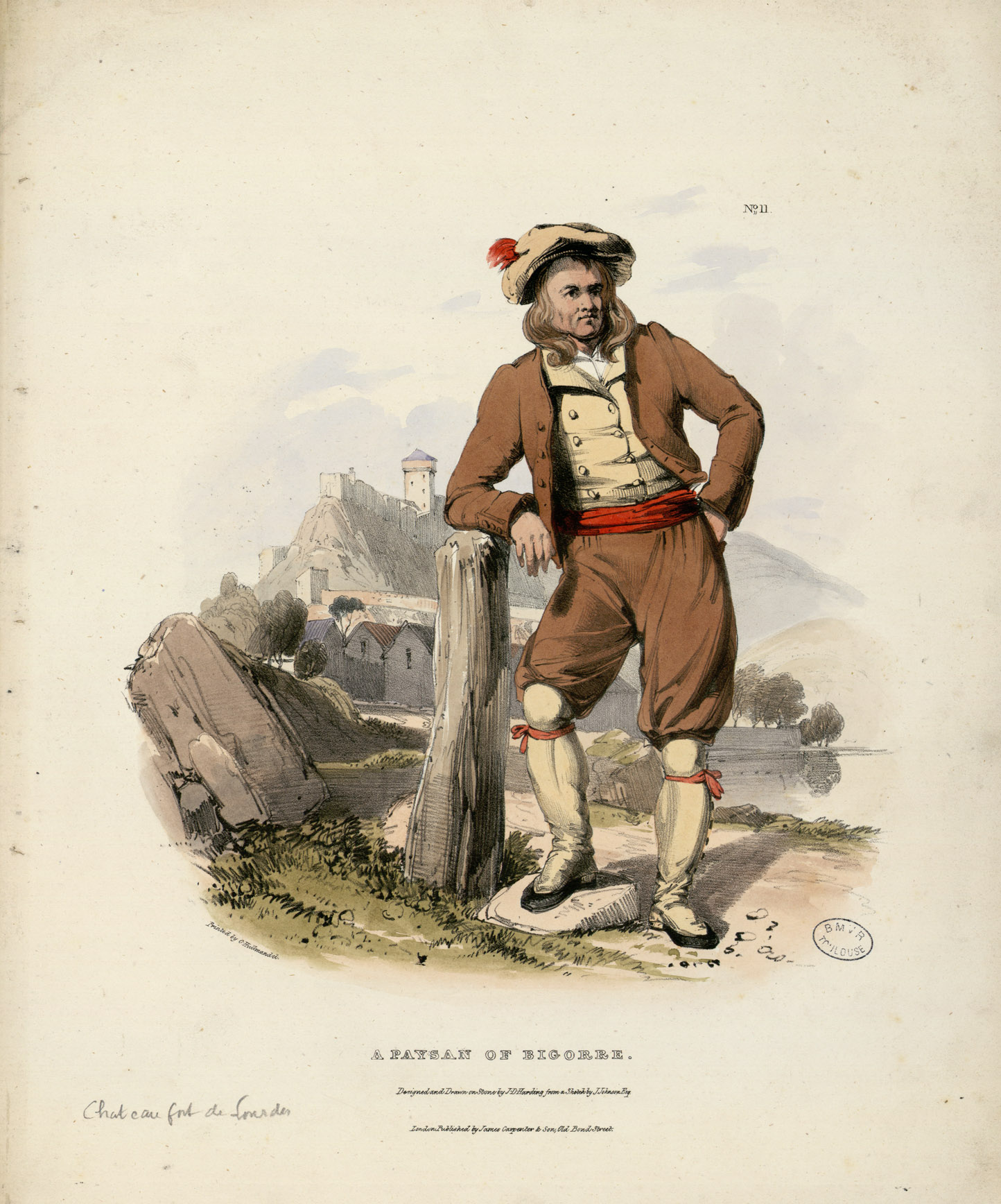
"A Paysan of Bigorre", James Duffield Harding, c. 1831.

Unlike so many other French provinces, Bigorre kept its provincial parliament, its estates, until the Revolution. The provincial estates of Bigorre decided the level of taxation in Bigorre, and how much tax money was given to the king of France. In 1789 Bigorre sent four representatives to the Estates-General in Versailles. The representatives of Bigorre lobbied quite successfully because in 1790 it was decided that Bigorre would become a French département (instead of being subordinated to the neighboring province of Béarn, also turned into a département, as had been initially planned). However, it was felt that Bigorre was not large enough to meet the criteria of a département, so it was decided that the province of Quatre-Vallées and a fragment of the province of Nébouzan, both to the east of Bigorre, as well as several areas of Gascony to the north of Bigorre, would be joined with Bigorre to create the new département of Hautes-Pyrénées. Quatre-Vallées and Nébouzan protested vehemently against the decision, saying they wished to join with the province of Comminges with which they had historical and economic ties, but it was to no avail. Tarbes, the capital of Bigorre, was made the capital of the new département.
