= Cardeilhac =

- Commune
- Location of Cardeilhac
- Location within France Location within Occitanie
- Coordinates: 43°17′54″N 0°41′04″E
- Country: France
- Region: Occitania
- Department: Haute-Garonne
- Arrondissement: Saint-Gaudens
- Canton: Saint-Gaudens

Government
  - Mayor (2020–2026): Raymond Boyer
- Area^{1}: 18.41 km^{2} (7.11 sq mi)
- Elevation: 440 m (1,440 ft)
- Highest elevation: 488 m (1,601 ft)
- Lowest elevation: 335 m (1,099 ft)
- Population (2023): 259
  - Density: 14.1/km^{2} (36.4/sq mi)
- Time zone: UTC+01:00 (CET)
  - Summer (DST): UTC+02:00 (CEST)
- INSEE/Postal code: 31108 /31350
- ^{1} French Land Register data, which excludes lakes, ponds, glaciers > 1 km^{2} (0.386 sq mi or 247 acres) and river estuaries.

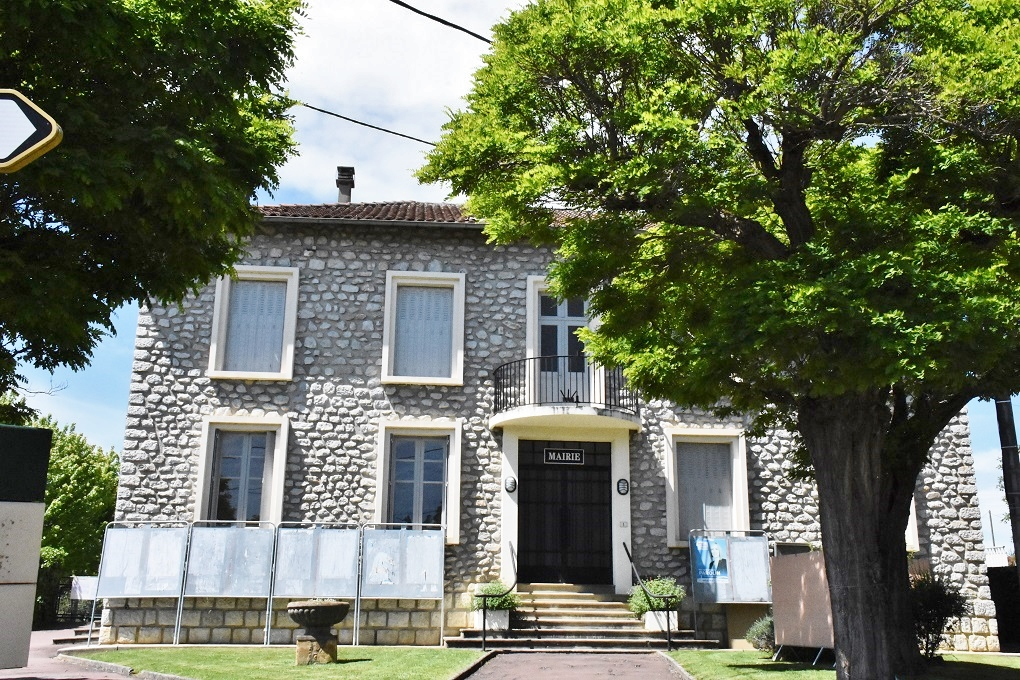
Cardeilhac

Cardeilhac (French pronunciation: [kaʁdɛjak]; Occitan: Cardelhac) is a commune in the Haute-Garonne department in southwestern France.

== Population ==
Historical population
Year	Pop.	±% p.a.
1968	310	—
1975	264	−2.27%
1982	232	−1.83%
1990	251	+0.99%
1999	230	−0.97%
2007	252	+1.15%
2012	257	+0.39%
2017	267	+0.77%
2023	259	−0.51%
Source: INSEE

== Sights ==
- Arboretum de Cardeilhac

== See also ==
- Communes of the Haute-Garonne department
