= Quatre-Vallées =

Historical province in southwestern France

Quatre-Vallées (French pronunciation: [katʁ vale], literally, "Four Valleys") (Gascon: Quate-Vaths) was a small province of France located in the southwest of France. It was made up of four constituent parts: Aure valley (Gascon: Aura), Barousse valley (Gascon: Varossa), Magnoac valley (Gascon: Manhoac), and Neste or Nestès valley (Gascon: Nèsta or Nestés).

== General characteristics ==
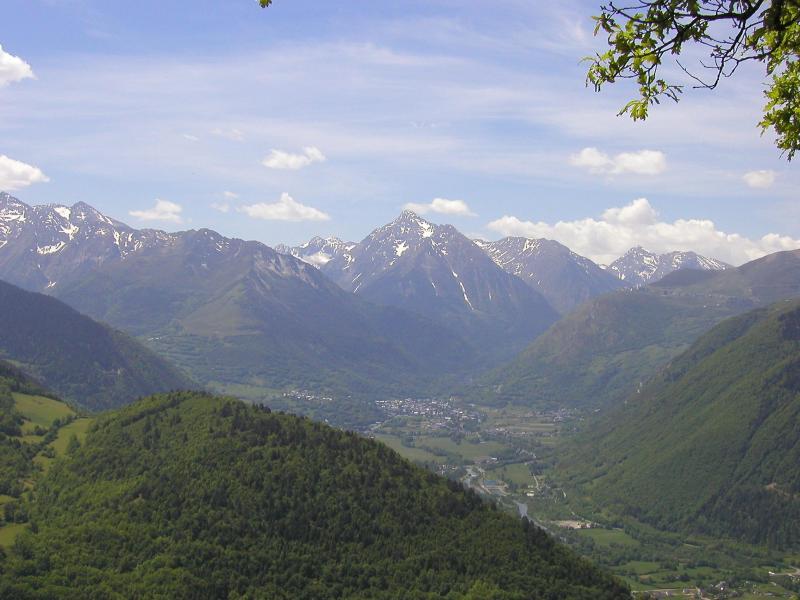
Aure valley

The Aure and Barousse valleys are contiguous. The Neste valley is also contiguous with Barousse and Aure, but most of the Neste valley was under the jurisdiction of Gascony and Comminges, and there were only two small enclaves in the Neste Valley that were part of the Quatre-Vallées province, these two enclaves being surrounded by villages under the jurisdiction of Gascony and Comminges, and physically separated from the Aure and Barousse valleys. The Aure, Barousse, and Neste valleys are all located in the Pyrenees mountains, in the southeast of the present-day département of Hautes-Pyrénées.

The Magnoac valley is located further north in the hilly countryside of Gascony, and is now the northeast of Hautes-Pyrénées. Magnoac was separated from Aure and Barousse by 19 km.(12 miles) of land not part of Quatre-Vallées.

Thus, the Quatre-Vallée province was altogether made up of four geographically detached parts, from south to north:

- Aure and Barousse valleys
- Neste valley (enclave #1)
- Neste valley (enclave #2)
- Magnoac valley

However, politically and administratively speaking, and no matter whether contiguous or detached, the four constituent parts of the Quatre-Vallée province were, from south to north:

- Aure valley
- Barousse valley
- Neste valley
- Magnoac valley

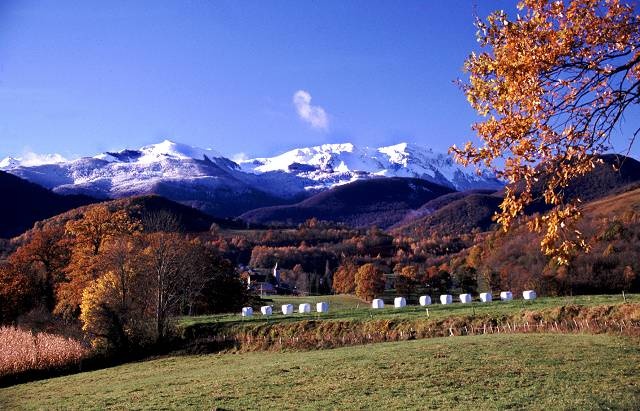
Montoussé in the Neste valley

Quatre-Vallées had a land area of 878 km^{2} (339 sq. miles), 58% being Aure, 22% being Magnoac, 17% being Barousse, and 3% being Neste. At the 1999 French census, there were 13,451 inhabitants on the territory of the former Quatre-Vallées province, 42% of these in Aure, 28% in Magnoac, 17% in Barousse, and 13% in Neste. The average density is thus very low for Europe, at 15 inh. per km^{2} (40 inh. per sq. mile), ranging from 11 inh. per km^{2} (28 inh. per sq. mile) in the Aure valley to 75 inh. per km^{2} (194 inh. per sq. mile) in the Neste valley.

There is no urban area on the territory of the former Quatre-Vallées province. In 1999 the largest villages were La Barthe-de-Neste (1,056 inhabitants) in the Neste valley and the ski resort of Saint-Lary-Soulan (1,024 inhabitants) in the Aure valley.

== History ==
Originally part of Comminges, the valleys of Aure, Barousse, Neste, and Magnoac were detached from Comminges in the 11th century and were divided between the counts of Aure, vassals of the kings of Aragon, and the counts of Astarac (in Gascony). The line of the counts of Aure ended in 1242 without a male heir, and the county of Aure was inherited by the counts of Labarthe (residing in La Barthe-de-Neste), who by then possessed the three other valleys of Neste, Barousse, and Magnoac. Thus, the four valleys were unified under the counts of Labarthe, and began to be known as Quatre-Vallées. The counts of Labarthe were vassals of the kings of Aragon, and so Quatre-Vallées was part of the kingdom of Aragon.

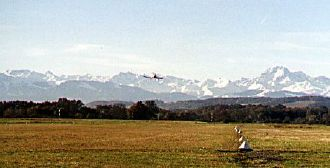
Magnoac valley with the Pyrenees in the distance

In June 1300, Count Bernard of Labarthe granted the 53 articles of the "Statutes, Customs, and Privileges of the Country of Quatre-Vallées". These statutes, written in the native Romance language of the inhabitants, were quite ahead of their time: they granted full liberty to the inhabitants of the Quatre-Vallées, free ownership of land, free use of communal ovens, free usage of the forests, and so on, as well as the right to be ruled by consuls representing the people. All these privileges and liberties were unprecedented in rural areas of medieval Europe, and were normally found only in chartered cities. The Statutes of 1300 are the origin of the special privileges and distinct character that the Quatre-Vallées kept until the French Revolution.

The Quatre-Vallées were a buffer zone between the county of Comminges and the powerful county of Armagnac (in Gascony), and were coveted by both, until eventually in 1398 they became a possession of the counts of Armagnac. In 1462, Count Jean V of Armagnac ceded the fief of Quatre-Vallées to his incestuous sister Isabelle of Armagnac. Isabelle, who had given her fortune to charities, ended up in utter poverty, and on top of it she became paralyzed with hemiplegia. Taking advantage of her weakness, Gaston de Lyon, Lord of Bezaudun and seneschal of Toulouse, lured the poor Isabelle into selling him the Quatre-Vallées against 5,127 gold crowns (écus d'or), which he never paid, always postponing payment in the hope of a rapid death of Isabelle.

At the same time, in 1475, as the king of France obtained Roussillon from the king of Aragon, the Quatre-Vallées were officially detached from the kingdom of Aragon and entered the kingdom of France. However, they were still not part of the royal domain, and were just one of the many independent fiefs of the kingdom of France.

Eventually, the maneuvering of Gaston de Lyon alerted higher authorities. Gaston de Lyon then sent his private doctor to Isabelle, and this one saw to it that she would not live long enough to embarrass his master. In August 1476, the paralyzed and forlorn Isabelle of Armagnac, who in her youth had been promised to the king of England, died in horrible pain after drinking a potion prepared by the doctor to "cure" her. She was only 45. Gaston de Lyon immediately claimed the Quatre-Vallées. His attitude was so revolting that the duke of Alençon and the duke of Vendôme, relatives of Isabelle of Armagnac, sued Gaston de Lyon to prevent him from obtaining the Quatre-Vallées. The trial lasted for more than a century. At last, ruined and discouraged, the descendants of Gaston de Lyon ceded the Quatre-Vallées to Henry III of Navarre, who owned many Pyrenean fiefs (Béarn, Lower Navarre, Bigorre, County of Foix, Nébouzan).

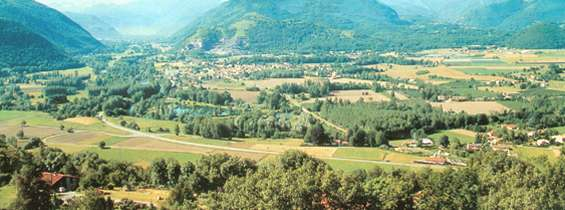
Barousse valley

In 1589, Henry III of Navarre became king Henry IV of France. In 1607, he united to the French crown those of his personal fiefs that were under French sovereignty (i.e. County of Foix, Bigorre, Quatre-Vallée, and Nébouzan, but not Béarn and Lower Navarre, which were sovereign countries outside of the kingdom of France), and so Quatre-Vallées became part of the royal domain. Nonetheless, Quatre-Vallées kept all its privileges granted in the Middle Ages, and it also kept its provincial states until the French Revolution, which decided freely what was the level of taxation and how much was given to the king. The provincial states of Quatre-Vallées, made up of only ten members, met once a year in an inn at Garaison, a famous pilgrimage center where the Virgin Mary was said to have appeared in the beginning of the 16th century. Garaison is located in the commune of Monléon-Magnoac, in the Magnoac valley. However, Arreau, the capital of the Aure valley, is often considered by local people to be the capital of Quatre-Vallées.

At the start of the French Revolution, the Quatre-Vallées remained quiet. They had been freed and exempted from feudal taxes and corvées for centuries already, and so they did not demand equality and the end of privileges like the other parts of France did. At first it was planned that Quatre-Vallées would gather with the provinces of Nébouzan and Comminges, and that the three would elect common representatives to the Estates-General in Versailles. The Quatre-Vallées saw this as a breach of their Statutes and autonomy, and they sent a letter of protest to Versailles. Eventually, they were allowed to send their own representative to the Estates-General. This representative was assigned the task of preserving the privileges of the Quatre-Vallées at all cost. However, there was not much he could do when feudalism and all the privileges were abolished by the French National Constituent Assembly in the night of 4 August 1789, and so the Quatre-Vallées lost their old privileges.

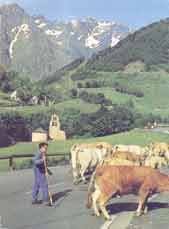
Aure valley

In 1790, when the départements were created, the Quatre-Vallées were too small to become a département, and against the wishes of their inhabitants, who wished to join with Comminges and Nébouzan to form a département, the Quatre-Vallées were joined with Bigorre, as well as with a fragment of Nébouzan and parts of Gascony, to form the département of Hautes-Pyrénées. The people of Quatre-Vallées objected bitterly, stressing the old historical and economic ties with Comminges, but it was to no avail. After that, the people of the Quatre-Vallées returned to their isolated and self-supporting lifestyle, away from the new trends and political changes that France experienced in the 19th century.

The area remained very traditional well into the 20th century, and modernity progressed only slowly. Like the rest of the Pyrenees, Quatre-Vallées suffered a lot from rural exodus. Today, the low population density of the Quatre-Vallées have turned them into a haven for nature lovers and people wishing to discover some of the wildest parts of the Pyrenees, where a spectacular landscape is combined with a rich historical heritage and many old monuments.
