= Cieutat =

- Commune
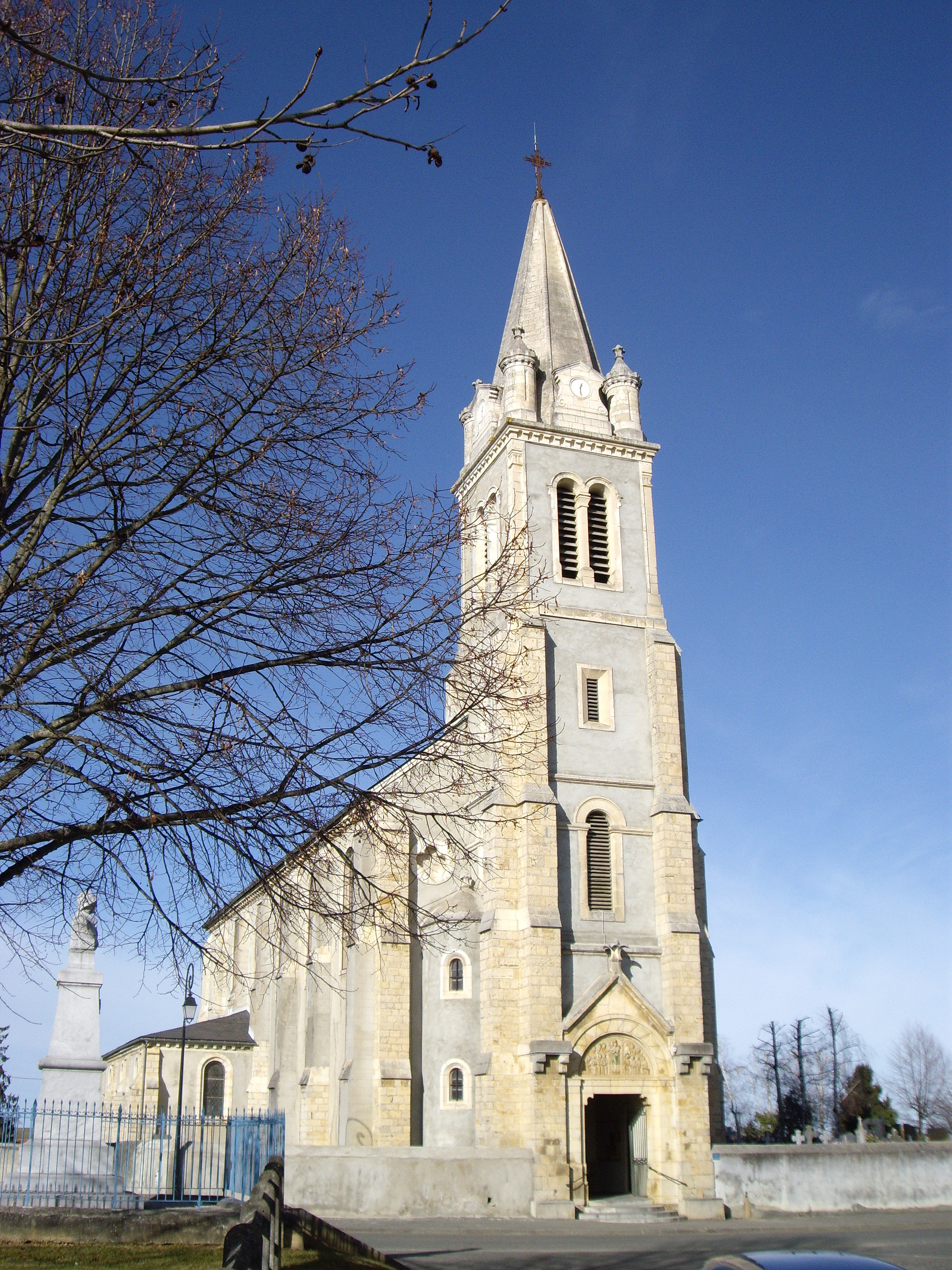
- The church of Saint-Barthélémy

- Coat of arms
- Location of Cieutat
- Location within France Location within Occitanie
- Coordinates: 43°07′23″N 0°12′56″E
- Country: France
- Region: Occitania
- Department: Hautes-Pyrénées
- Arrondissement: Bagnères-de-Bigorre
- Canton: La Vallée de l'Arros et des Baïses
- Intercommunality: CC de la Haute-Bigorre

Government
  - Mayor (2020–2026): Philippe Dansaut
- Area^{1}: 18.78 km^{2} (7.25 sq mi)
- Elevation: 584 m (1,916 ft)
- Highest elevation: 589 m (1,932 ft)
- Lowest elevation: 327 m (1,073 ft)
- Population (2023): 603
  - Density: 32.1/km^{2} (83.2/sq mi)
- Time zone: UTC+01:00 (CET)
  - Summer (DST): UTC+02:00 (CEST)
- INSEE/Postal code: 65147 /65200
- ^{1} French Land Register data, which excludes lakes, ponds, glaciers > 1 km^{2} (0.386 sq mi or 247 acres) and river estuaries.

Cieutat (French pronunciation: [sjœta]; Occitan: Ciutat) is a commune in the Hautes-Pyrénées department in south-western France.

Its name comes from the Latin word civitas because in the Early Middle Ages it was the capital of the former French province of Bigorre.

== See also ==
- Communes of the Hautes-Pyrénées department
