= Bigordans =

Bigordans is the term for the inhabitants of Bigorre.

At least into the first half of the 20th century the Bigordans maintained a separate ethnic and cultural identity from other French people. There were very adamant in claiming differences from the neighboring Béarnais. However, by the start of the 20th century the springs and baths of Bigorre were attracting many visitors from other parts of France, and the local ethnic uniqueness was threatened.

In the 1984 edition of the Britannica, Bigordans are still shown as a separate ethnic group on the map "Primary European Ethnic Culture Areas". However this same map still shows Silesia and East Prussia as inhabited by Germans, as well as the Sudetenland. Since these areas had mass deportations of their German population after the Second World War, it is evident that the map does not reflect the reality of ethnic concentrations in Europe for any year after 1945.

== Sources ==
- Miltoun, Francis. Castles and chateaux of old Navarre and the Basque Provinces: including also Foix, Roussillon and Béarn. (Boston: L C. Page & Company, 1907) p. 85
- Encyclopædia Britannica. 1984 Edition. Vol. 6, p. 1122.
- Michelet, Jules. (trans. G. H. Smith). History of France. (New York: D. Appleton & Co., 1869) p. 162
