= Nébouzan =

French Province

Coordinates: 43.17°N 0.58°E

Nébouzan (French pronunciation: [nebuzɑ̃]; Gascon: Nebosan [nebuˈza]) was a small province of France located in the foothills of the Pyrenees mountains, in the southwest of France. It was not a contiguous province, but it was made up of several detached territories, approximately half of them around the town of Saint-Gaudens in the south of the present-day département of Haute-Garonne, and the other half around the town of Lannemezan in the east of the present-day département of Hautes-Pyrénées. The capital of Nébouzan was Saint-Gaudens.

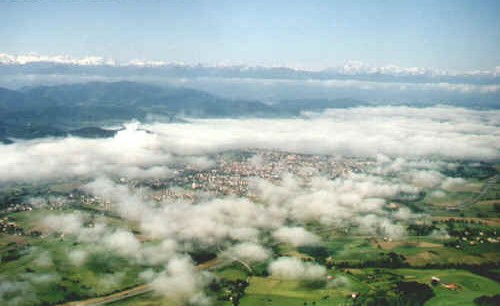
Saint-Gaudens under the clouds, with the Pyrenees in the background

Nébouzan had a land area of 465 km^{2} (180 sq mi). At the 1999 French census there were 29,218 inhabitants on the territory of the former province of Nébouzan, which means a density of 63 inh. per km^{2} (163 inh. per sq. mile). There are only two urban areas in Nébouzan: Saint-Gaudens, with 11,503 inhabitants in 1999, and Lannemezan, with 6,137 inhabitants in 1999.

Historically, Nébouzan was a part of Comminges. Sometime in the 13th century, the area of Saint-Plancard, 16 km. (10 miles) northwest of Saint-Gaudens, became the viscounty of Nébouzan, and its viscounts were vassals of the counts of Comminges. In 1258, the viscount of Béarn, Gaston VII, acquired Saint-Gaudens and Nébouzan. Apparently, he had some claims over it through his wife, daughter of the last countess of Bigorre, herself a daughter of Count Bernard IV of Comminges. From 1267 on, Saint-Gaudens became the capital of Nébouzan. Then, in 1290, when Gaston VII of Béarn died without a male heir, it was his son-in-law Count Roger-Bernard III of Foix (see: List of counts of Foix) who inherited Béarn, and so Nébouzan became one of the fiefs of the House of Foix-Béarn.

In the second part of the 14th century, the famous count Gaston III Fébus of Foix, who was trying to join his domains of Béarn and Foix together, managed to acquire Lannemezan (30 km./19 miles west of Saint-Gaudens), and then the fortified castle of Mauvezin, a key position near Lannemezan. These areas were incorporated into Nébouzan. Eventually, the House of Foix-Béarn also managed to acquire Bigorre, and there remained only Comminges and Couserans, united to the French crown in the 1450s, which prevented them from creating a continuous territory from Foix to Béarn.

Later, the estates of the House of Foix-Béarn passed through heiresses to the House of Albret, then eventually to the House of Bourbon with Henry III of Navarre, son of Antoine de Bourbon and Jeanne d'Albret. Henry III of Navarre became King Henry IV of France in 1589. In 1607, he united to the French crown those of his personal fiefs that were under French sovereignty (i.e. County of Foix, Bigorre, Quatre-Vallées, and Nébouzan, but not Béarn and Lower Navarre, which were sovereign countries outside of the kingdom of France), and so Nébouzan became part of the royal domain.

Before the French Revolution, Nébouzan was made part of the gouvernement (military area) of Guienne-Gascony, whereas for general matters it depended from the généralité of Auch like the rest of Gascony (although for a certain period of time it depended from the généralité of Pau, like Béarn, Bigorre, County of Foix, and the Basque provinces). For judicial matters, Nébouzan depended from the Parlement of Toulouse.

Unlike so many other French provinces, Nébouzan, despite its small size, kept its provincial states until the Revolution. The provincial states of Nébouzan, which met in Saint-Gaudens, decided what was the level of taxation in Nébouzan, and how much tax money was given to the king of France. In 1789, when it was time to elect representatives to the Estates-General in Versailles, Nébouzan was forced to join with the province of Comminges, which surrounded almost entirely the several detached areas making up Nébouzan, and together they elected eight representatives to Versailles. Nébouzan sent a letter of protest to Versailles: "The province of Nébouzan would regard as a disgrace the refusal of her deputation"; but it was to no avail.

In 1790, when French départements were created, the eastern part of Nébouzan around Saint-Gaudens and Saint-Plancard was joined with Comminges, a part of Languedoc, and a part of Gascony to form the Haute-Garonne département, while the western part of Nébouzan around Lannemezan and Mauvezin was joined with Quatre-Vallées, Bigorre, and small parts of Gascony to form the Hautes-Pyrénées département.

Today, Nébouzan is probably the most forgotten of the old provinces of France. Most other provinces, although no longer on the administrative map, still exist as cultural or economic areas, with people frequently referring to them. Nébouzan, however, is largely ignored today. People living on the territory of the former province of Nébouzan think of their area as "Comminges", and indeed Saint-Gaudens is nowadays considered to be the capital of Comminges (with the city of Saint-Gaudens officially claiming to be the "Capital of Comminges"). It is maybe further west, in Hautes-Pyrénées, around Lannemezan, that Nébouzan is most remembered, because people there feel quite distinct from Bigorre (with which the Hautes-Pyrénées département is too often confused), and so they like to mention that their area was once Nébouzan, not Bigorre.
