= Saint-Bertrand-de-Comminges Cathedral =

Coordinates: 43°1′36″N 0°34′16″E

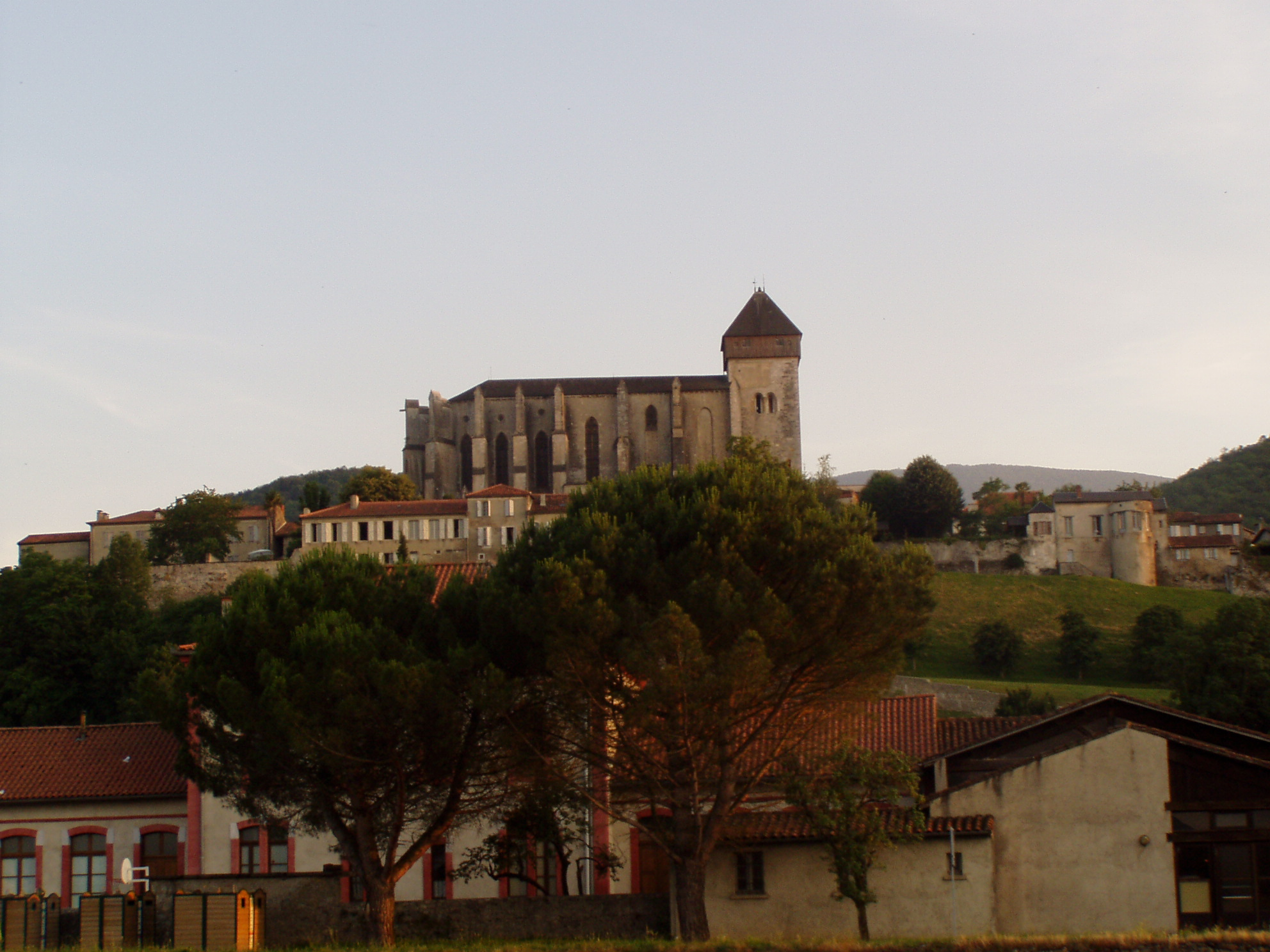
Distant view of the Cathedral

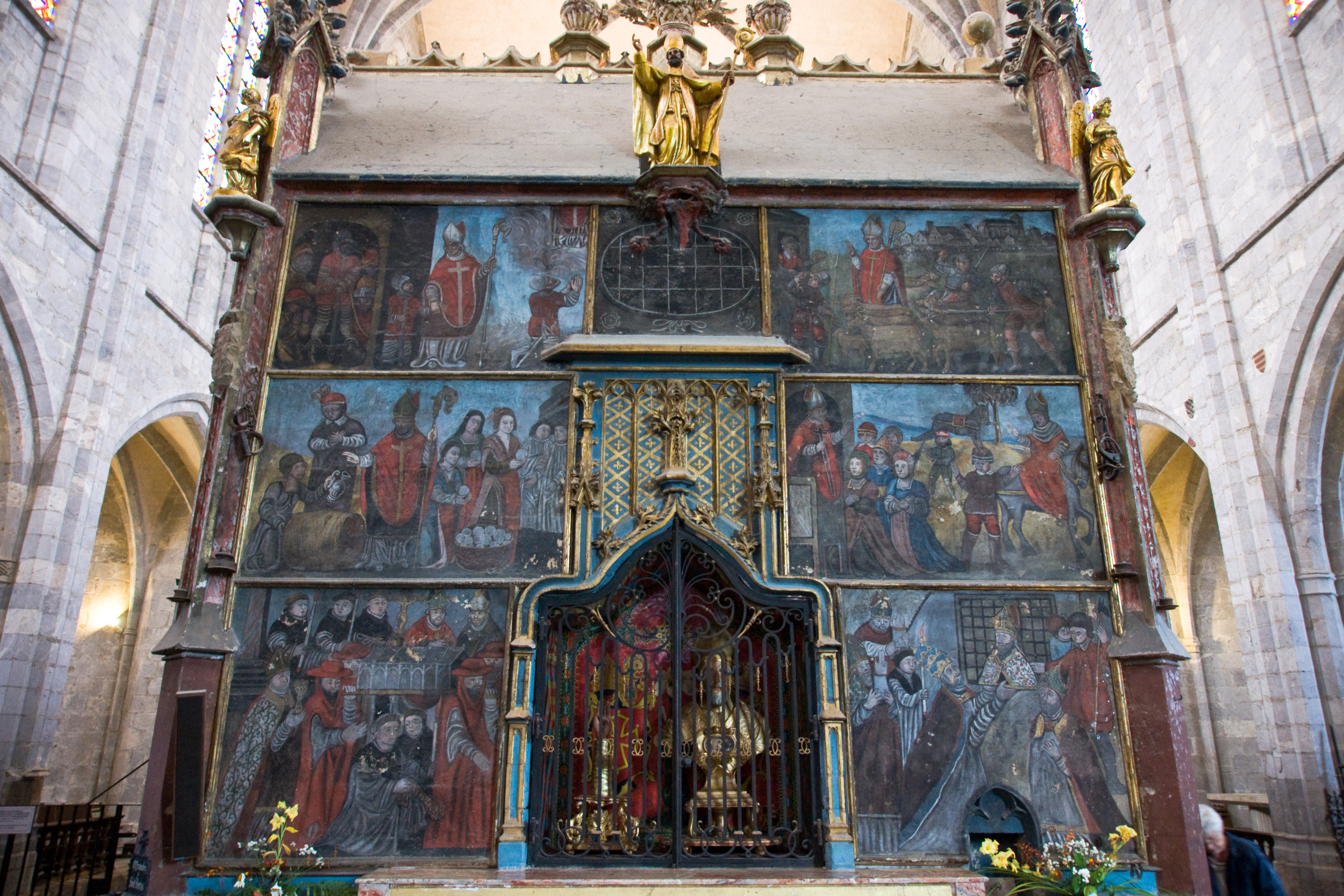
Tomb of Saint-Bertrand

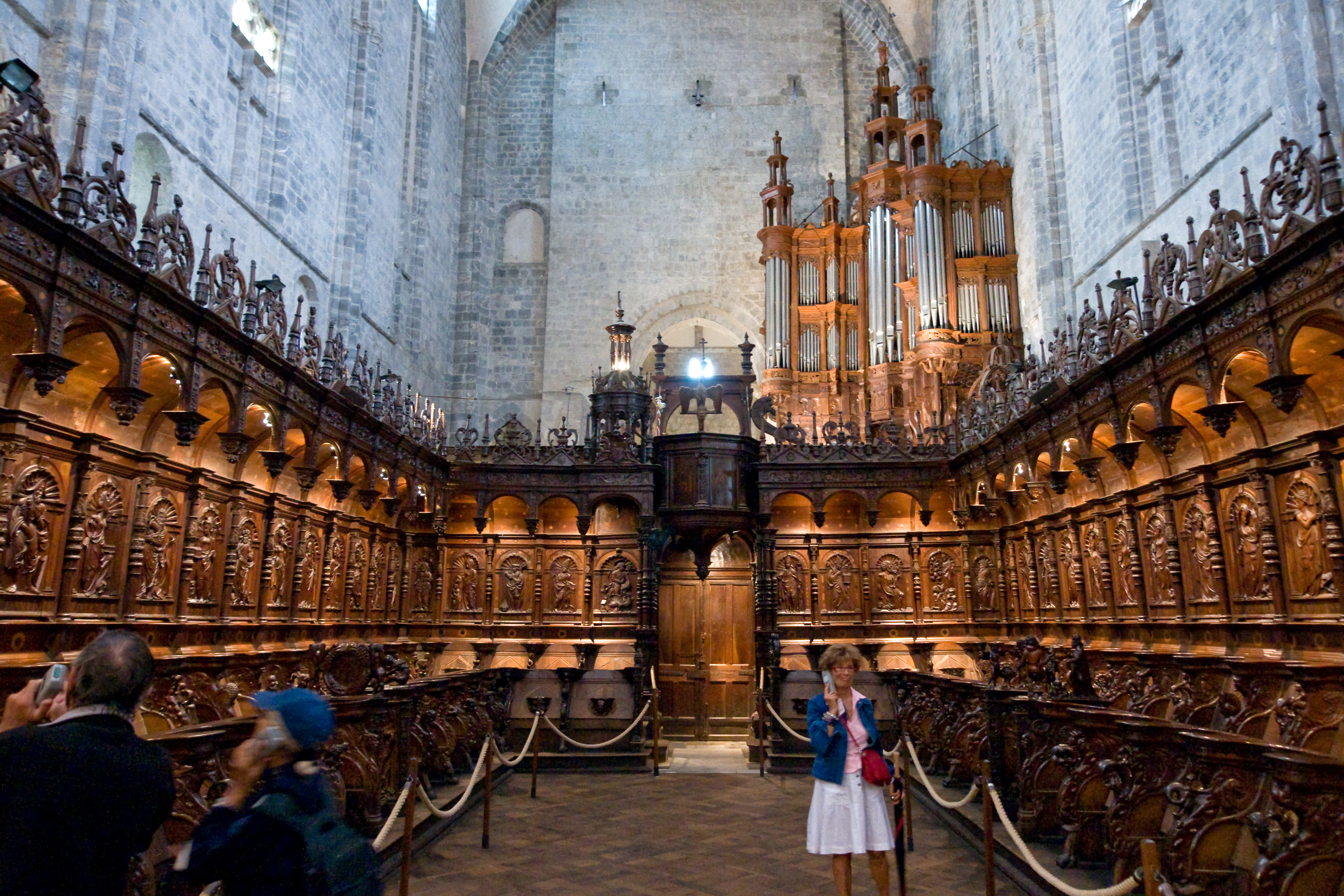
The stalls and the organ

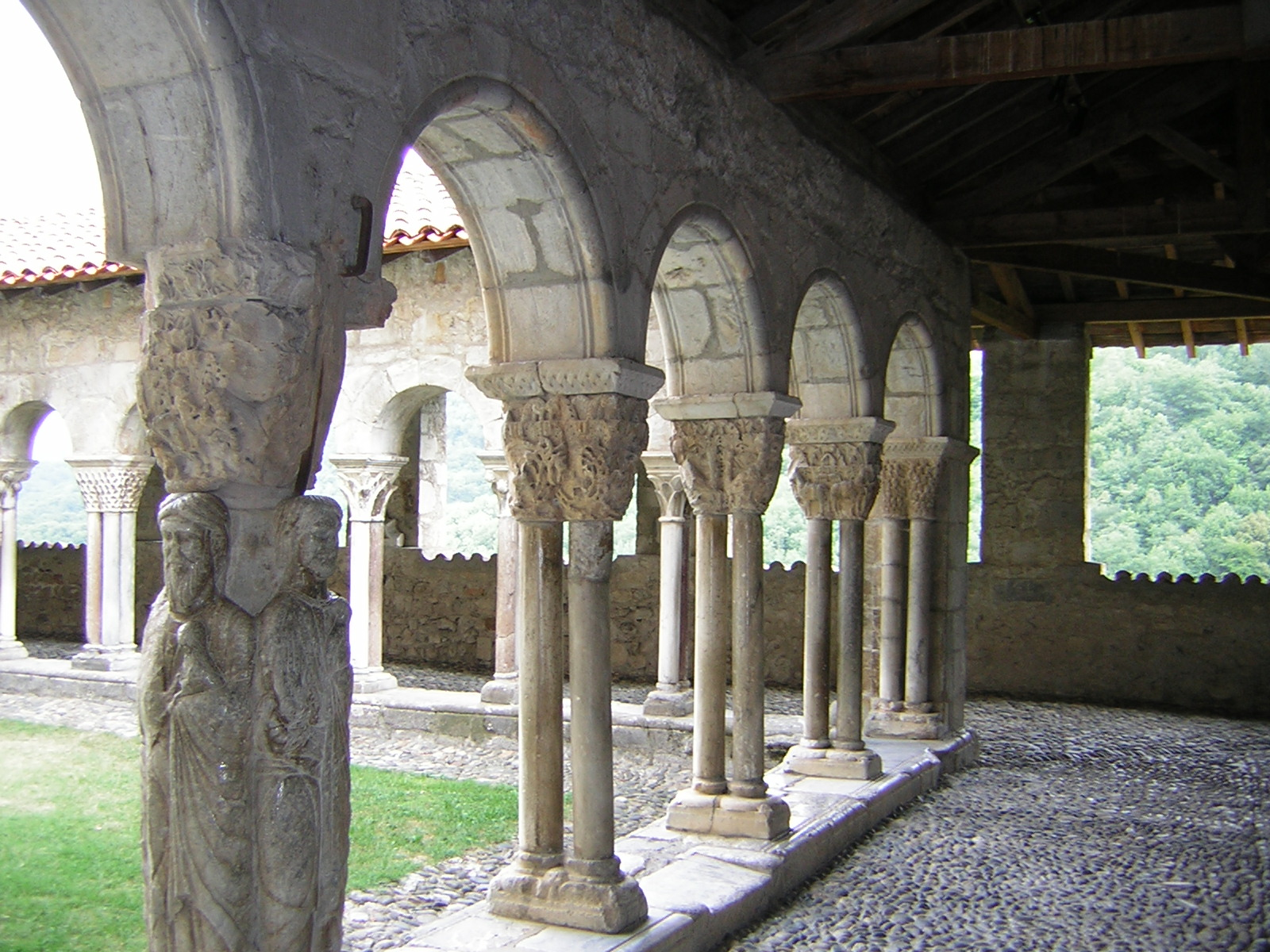
The cloister

Saint-Bertrand-de-Comminges Cathedral (French: Cathédrale Notre-Dame de Saint-Bertrand-de-Comminges) is a former Roman Catholic cathedral in Saint-Bertrand-de-Comminges, Haute-Garonne, southwestern France. It was the seat of the Ancient Diocese of Comminges.

== Description ==
Entering the nave, three distinct architectural styles can be seen at the same time:

- The Romanesque part of the 12th century.
- The Gothic part of the 14th century commissioned by Bertrand de Goth.
- And the Renaissance part as well as the organ from the 16th century.

The narthex ends in two huge pillars, each with a circumference of no less than 11.45m. Over the northern and southern walls one can see the Romanesque arches, the floor is made of marble and includes some tombs and sepulchres. The cloister is also clearly Romanesque and offers an impressive view over the entire valley.

The Gothic part is built in the Meridional Gothic style. There is a single nave that is 55m long, 16m wide and 28m high. Over the arrow arches there are the coats of arms of the founding bishops. The stained glass windows are impressive with their intricate details, almost comparable to those of Auch.

The stalls within the choir were commissioned by Jean de Mauléon but because of the lack of documents it is impossible to name the artist that made them, although, by comparison with other stalls, these are often considered to be the work of Nicolas Bachelier, or rather, of his school which had been using artists from France, Spain and Italy. Most of the work was done in oak and walnut tree, and the choir seems to be separate from the rest of the church in that it contrasts so much with the Gothic and Romanesque parts.

The sixty-seven stalls represent characters from both the Old and the New Testaments, including scenes such as 'temptation', 'envy' and 'lust'.

Inside the sanctuary it is possible to see some representations of the chanson de geste the Song of Roland, with Oliver clearly represented.

Bizarrely, there is a stuffed crocodile inside the cathedral. This fact, as well as a general description of the cathedral itself and details of its history, features prominently in Canon Alberic's Scrap-Book, a ghost story by M. R. James.

The former cathedral has been listed as a UNESCO World Heritage Site as part of the World Heritage Sites of the Routes of Santiago de Compostela in France.
