= Comminges =

Coordinates: 43.02°N 0.57°E

- Natural region
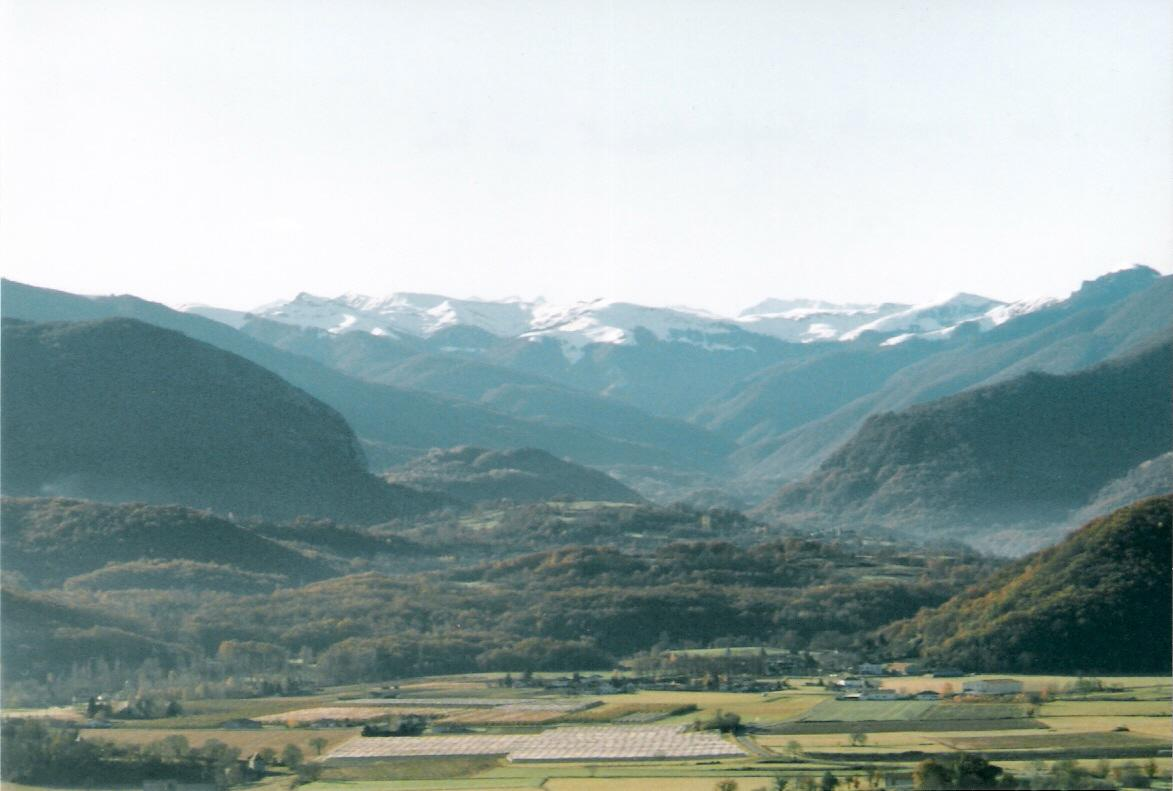
- A valley in Comminges

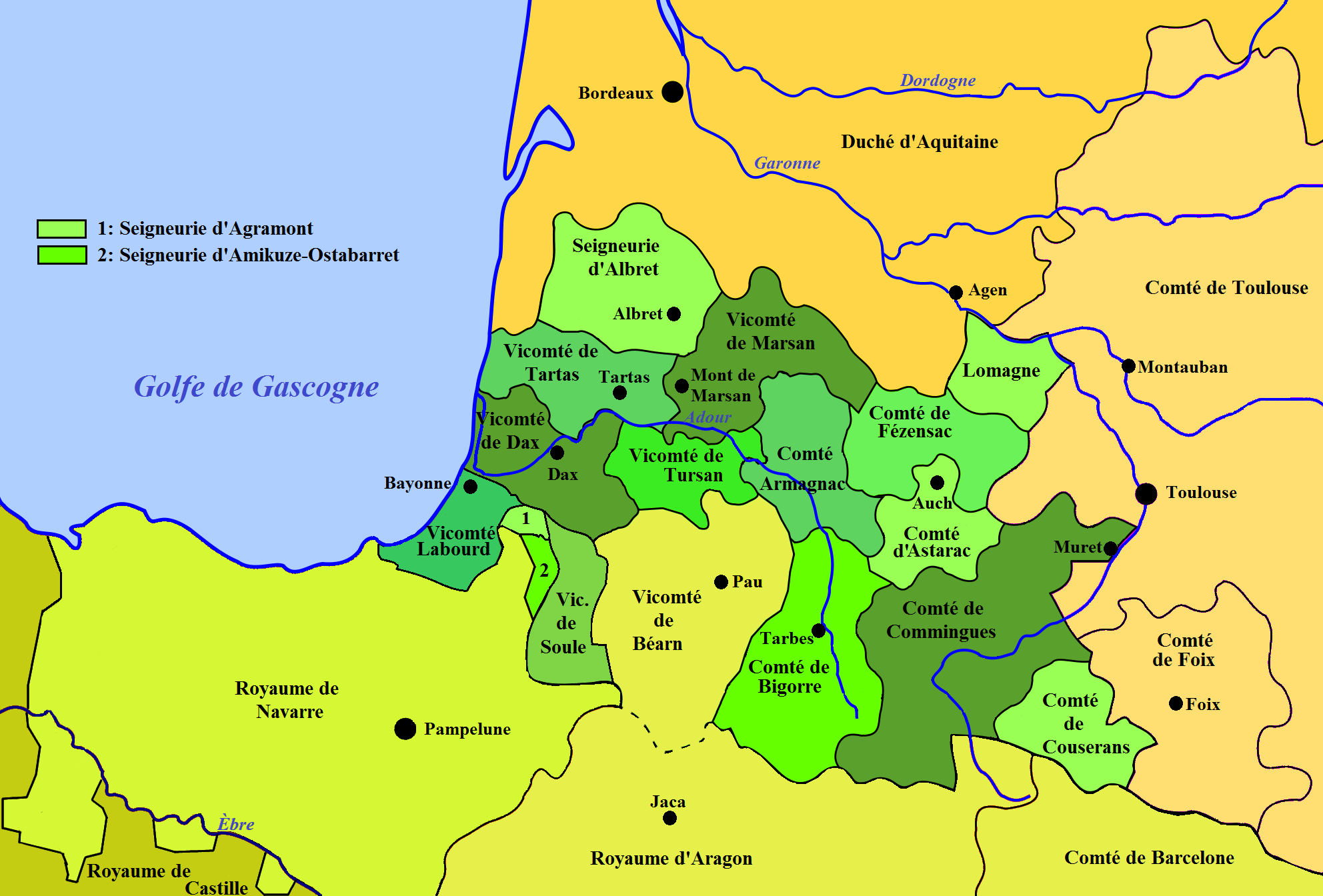
- Duchy of Gascony around 1150. Comté de Comminges shown in dark green at lower right.
- Countries: France

The Comminges (French pronunciation: [kɔmɛ̃ʒ]; Occitan/Gascon: Comenge) is an ancient region of southern France in the foothills of the Pyrenees, corresponding approximately to the arrondissement of Saint-Gaudens in the department of Haute-Garonne. This region is normally associated with the former domain of the Counts of Comminges, although earlier definitions are based on the Diocese of Comminges or the territory of the Convenae.

== History ==
- Archaeological evidence of early human habitation has been found at several caves or rock shelters in the area, including the Cave of Aurignac where artifacts indicated habitation about 35,000 years ago.
- In pre-Roman times, Comminges was part of a larger area inhabited by the Aquitani. Classical authors such as Julius Caesar and Strabo clearly distinguished the Aquitani from the other peoples of Gaul, and noted their similarity to the tribes of the Iberian Peninsula.
- Comminges takes its name from the Convenae, the name the Romans gave to the inhabitants of the region. Whilst it is unclear whether this was originally a distinct tribe (the latin word convenae can be translated as 'strangers', or 'those gathered here'), the Romanisation of the region established this as the identity of the area and its inhabitants.
- The main town of the area was named Lugdunum Convenarum by the Romans. Saint Jerome claimed that the town was founded by Pompey in 72 BC, but extensive archaeological investigations have failed to find any evidence of this and scholars doubt the claim. During the Augustan period, the town was substantially Romanised and expanded. The remains of large Gallo-Roman villas at Valentine, Martres-Tolosane and Montmaurin suggest that the Romanisation spread well beyond Lugdunum.
- There was a growing Christian community, which by the late fourth century became the Diocese of Comminges based at Lugdunum. In 1083 Bertrand de l'Isle-Jourdain became bishop of Comminges and built the cathedral and Romanesque cloister at Lugdunum. He was canonised as Saint Bertrand in the 13th century and the town took the name Saint-Bertrand-de-Comminges.
- The origin of the name Comminges is uncertain. It is often claimed to date from 473, when Sidonius Apollinaris wrote of the death of the bishop of Comminges, or 506 when Suavis, Bishop of Comminges, attended the Council of Agde. However, the original latin texts of the relevant documents use the term Convenae or Convenis rather than Comminges. There are a number of documents concerning the Counts of the Comminges from the 12th century. Those written in latin typically use the name Convenarum, whilst those written in Gascon or Old French usually use the name Comenge.

Coat-of-arms of Comminges

- Comminges was part of Gascony. Around 820, Aznar Sanchez was made Count of Vasconia Citerior (i.e. Gascony) by King Pepin I of Aquitaine, the grandson of Charlemagne. He made his son Garcia Aznar Viscount of Comminges (or Convenarum) in 833. After his father died Garcia Aznar became Count of Comminges and Couseran.
- Over the centuries, the size of the county varied, stretching to Toulouse at times. The small, discontinuous province of Nébouzan was contained within the Comminges and its viscounts were vassals of the counts of Comminges.
- Although the Comminges was just outside the Cathar area, during the Albigensian Crusade Count Bernard IV de Comminges sided with the Cathar forces led by Peter II of Aragon and Raymond VI of Toulouse but, at the Battle of Muret in 1213, they were defeated by the forces of Simon de Montfort the elder who occupied the Comminges. In 1215, the fourth Lateran Council awarded the County of Toulouse to de Montfort, but returned the Comminges to Bernard IV. However, it was not until the death of Simon de Montford in the siege of Toulouse in 1218 that Bernard regain control of his county.
- During the Hundred Years' War, the army of Edward the Black Prince passed through the Comminges twice in 1355, burning towns in the north of the county.
- The line of the Counts of Comminges continued until Marguerite died in 1443, when the county was willed to the French crown. After two interim rulers, it finally came under the rule of the French crown in 1498, although it retained its identity as a county. It was established as a pays d'état, meaning that it was effectively run by the Estates of Comminges (a type of local parliament), until 1622.
- During the French wars of religion (1562–1598) the Comminges remained Catholic. A few towns were attacked by Huguenot forces and Saint-Gaudens was looted in 1569, but most of the county remained safe. However it was required to provide troops and taxes to support the wars.
- With the reorganisation of the regions into departments in 1790, Comminges wanted to join its eastern neighbour, the county of Couserans, to form a department but this broke down over arguments about where the prefecture would be located. Eventually Couserans joined with the county of Foix, leaving the Comminges to be joined with the larger county of Toulouse to form the Haute-Garonne département. At the same time the diocese of Comminges was abolished and replaced with a larger diocese aligned with the new department.
- The region still identifies itself as the Comminges and Saint-Gaudens, its largest town, calls itself "capital of the Comminges".

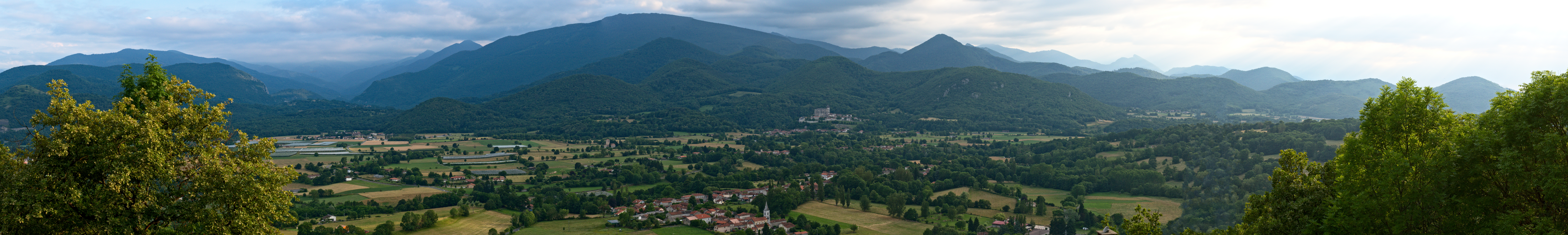
The valley of the Comminges

== In film and television ==
In 2017, the Netflix TV series The Frozen Dead (aka Glacé) was filmed in the region.

== See also ==
- Saint Bertrand of Comminges
- Duchy of Vasconia
- Spanish: House of Comminges
- Nébouzan
- Savès

== Sources and external links ==
- Rome in the Pyrenees - Lugdunum and the Convenae from the first century B.C. to the seventh century A.D. Simon Esmonde Cleary 2007 (ISBN 978-0-415-42686-2)
- Petite Histoire du Comminges Rene Souriac 2019 (ISBN 978-2-35068-705-6)
- La revue de Comminges et des Pyrénées centrales, revue d'études régionales biannuelle de la Société des études du Comminges, depuis 1884 (ISSN 0035-1059)
- Société des études du Comminges
