= Bertrand of Comminges =

French Roman Catholic saint

Saint Bertrand
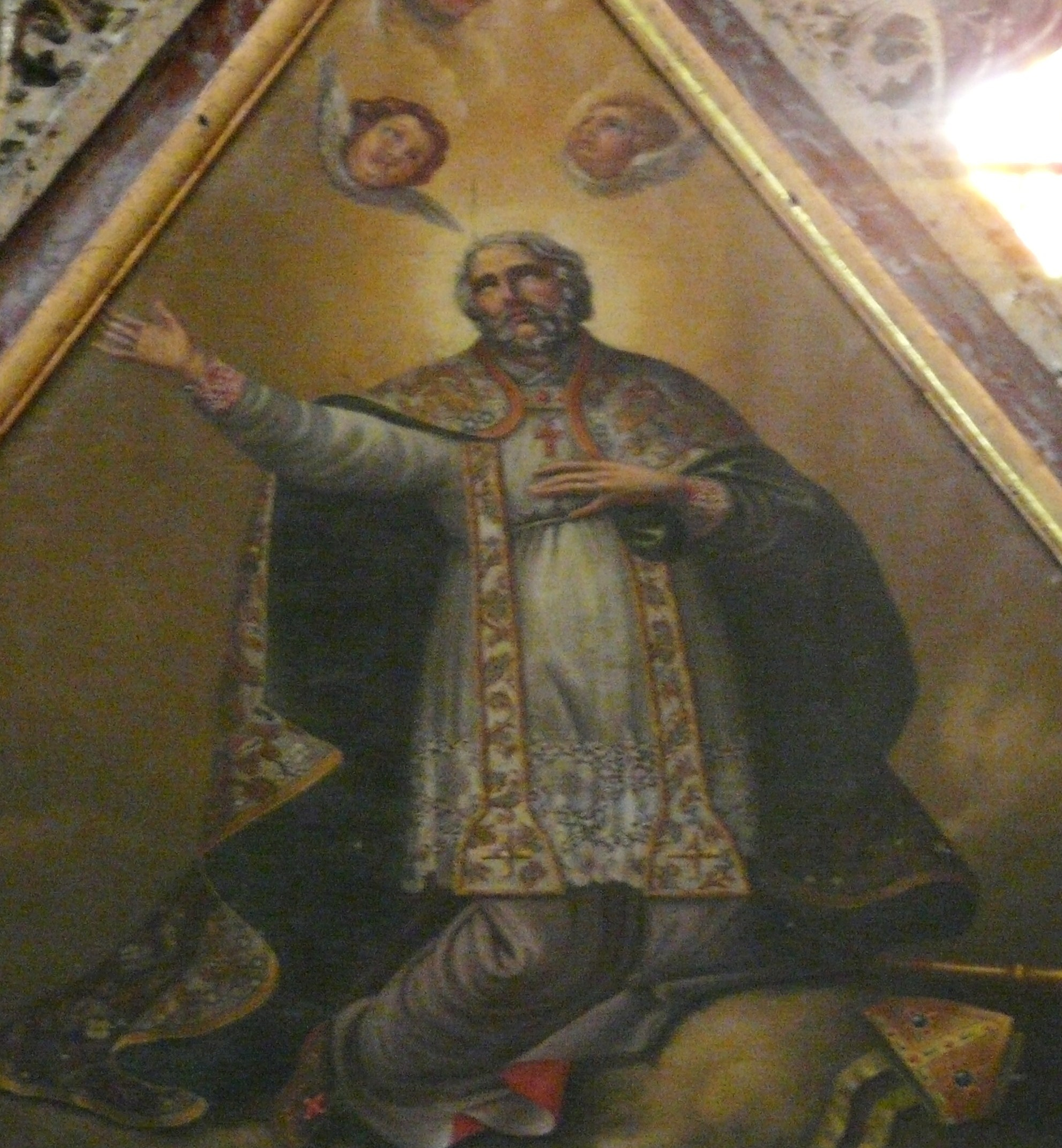
- St. Bertrand of Comminges, as depicted on panel on his tomb, in Saint-Bertrand-de-Comminges Cathedral, Haute-Garonne

Bishop of Comminges
- Born: c.1050 L'Isle-Jourdain, France
- Died: 1126; Lugdunum Convenarum, (now known as Saint-Bertrand-de-Comminges), France
- Venerated in: Catholic Church
- Beatified: ca. 1220 by Pope Honorius III
- Canonized: 1309 by Pope Clement V
- Major shrine: Saint-Bertrand-de-Comminges Cathedral
- Feast: 16 October
- Patronage: Commune of Saint-Bertrand-de-Comminges

Bertrand of Comminges (c. 1050 - 1126) was Bishop of Comminges, in the diocese of Toulouse, France. It is after him that the commune of Saint-Bertrand-de-Comminges, is named.

== Early life ==
Bertrand de l'Isle was born at L'Isle-Jourdain, in 1050, to Raymond Atton, who was a military officer and Lord of L'Isle-Jourdain, and Gervaise Emma Taillefer, daughter of Count William III Taillefer de Toulouse. William IV and Raymond IV of Saint-Gilles, were his cousins. Bertrand was raised to be a knight but in adulthood he entered religious life.

== Religious life ==
Bertrand became a canon of Saint Augustine in Toulouse, and then successively archdeacon of Toulouse (circa 1070) and Lugdunum Convenarum (taking office between 1078 and 1080). In this role, which he maintained until his death, he implemented in his mountain diocese principles of the Gregorian reform, both in regard to the discipline of clergy as religious and moral life of the laity. He participated in the reform councils of Bordeaux (1093), Clermont (1095) and Poitiers (1100).

During his long episcopate, almost half a century, the city of Lugdunum Convenarum - which would later take his name, Saint-Bertrand-de-Comminges - was revived. It became a stop for pilgrims on the way to Santiago de Compostela. He rebuilt the cathedral, with its Romanesque cloister. The cathedral would later be dedicated in his honour. It is listed as a UNESCO World Heritage Sites of the Routes of Santiago de Compostela in France.

== Death and legacy ==
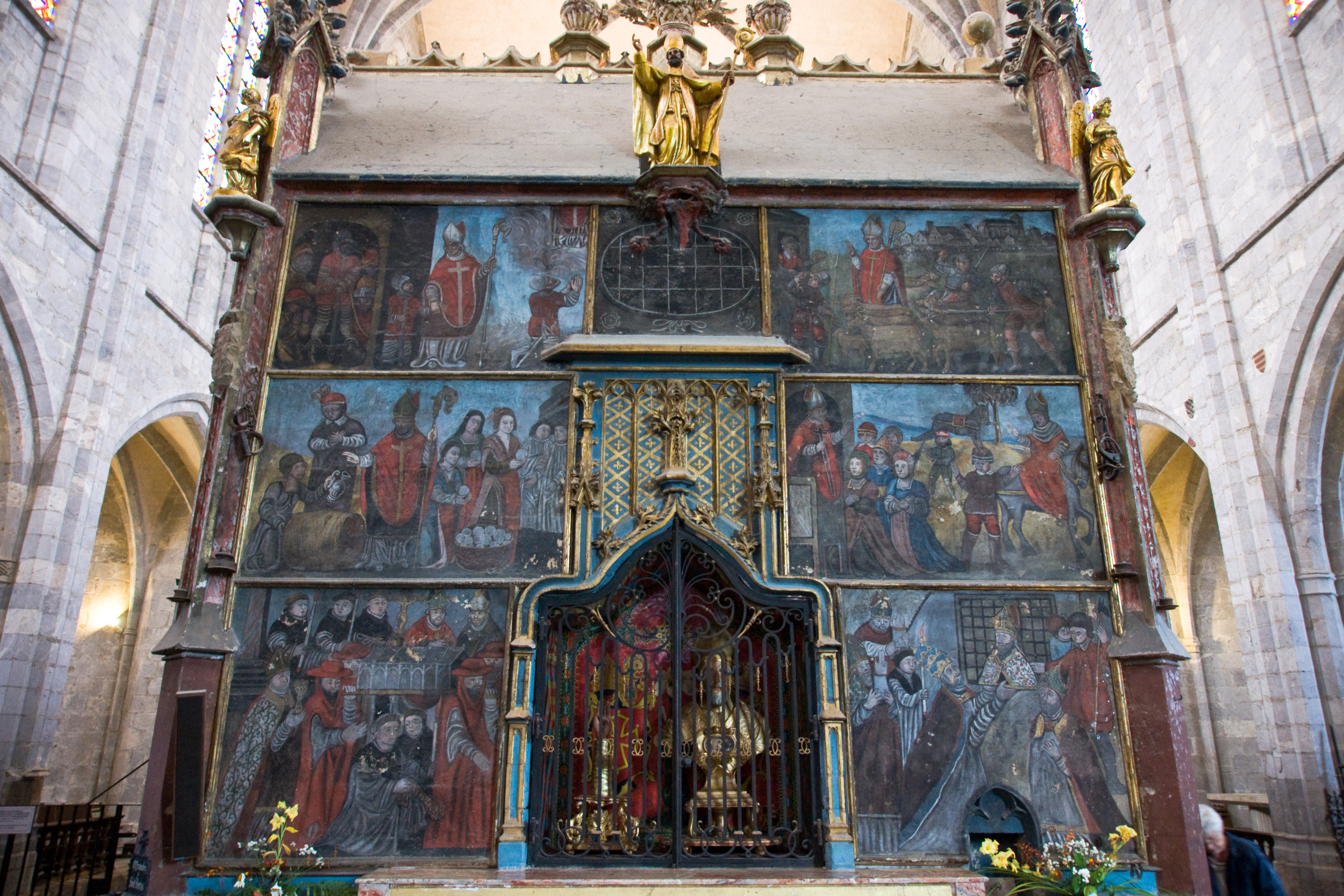
Tomb of Saint Bertrand

Upon his death he was considered a saint in that locale. Around 1167, the Archbishop of Auch commissioned a cleric named Vital to write his life and sent to the Curia for his canonization. The first the cause for beatification was rejected, but later Pope Honorius III opened an investigation in 1218. Later the pontiff beatified him between 1220 and 1222, although this is not evidenced by any document of the time. In 1309, in any case, Pope Clement V, who was himself Bishop of Comminges, lifted Bertrand to the sainthood. A magnificent tomb was built in their honor by Cardinal Pierre de Foix, who occupied the episcopal seat of Comminges from 1422 to 1442.
