= County of Foix =

Medieval fief and later province in France

County of Foix Comté de Foix (French) Comtat de Fois (Occitan) Comtat de Foix (Catalan)
- Mid-11th Century–1789
- Flag Coat of arms

- County of Foix in France (1789)
- Capital: Foix
- Demonym: Foixian
- Government
  - Type: Province
- Count
  - 1034-1064: Roger-Bernard I
  - 1343-1391: Gaston III
  - 1436-1472: Gaston IV
- History
  - Established: Mid-11th Century
  - Disestablished: 1789
- Today part of: France

The County of Foix (French: Comté de Foix, pronounced [fwa]; Occitan: Comtat de Fois, pronounced [fujs] locally [fujʃ]; Catalan: Comtat de Foix, pronounced [foʃ]) was a medieval fief in southern France, and later a province of France, whose territory corresponded roughly the eastern part of the modern département of Ariège (the western part of Ariège being Couserans).

During the Middle Ages, the county of Foix was ruled by the counts of Foix, whose castle overlooks the town of Foix. In 1290 the counts of Foix acquired the viscountcy Béarn, which became the center of their domain, and from that time on the counts of Foix rarely resided in the county of Foix, preferring the richer and more verdant Béarn.

The county of Foix was an autonomous fief of the kingdom of France and consisted of an agglomeration of small holdings ruled by lords, who, though subordinate to the counts of Foix, had some voice in the government of the county.

The provincial estates of the county, a legislative body that can be traced back to the 14th century, consisted of three orders and possessed considerable power and energy. In the 17th and 18th centuries Foix formed one of the thirty-three gouvernements, or military areas, of France and kept its provincial estates until the French Revolution. In 1790 it was joined with Couserans to form the département of Ariège.

The county of Foix, as it existed just before the French Revolution, had a land area of 2,466 km^{2} (952 sq. miles).

At the 1999 census there were 76,809 inhabitants living on the territory of the former province of the county of Foix, which means a density of only 32 inh. per km^{2} (84 inh. per sq. miles). The largest urban areas are Pamiers, with 17,715 inhabitants in 1999, and Foix, with 10,378 inhabitants in 1999.

== History ==
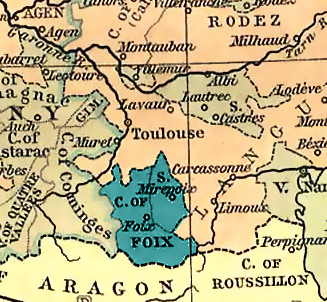
County of Foix in 1328 (Béarn is outside of the map).

=== House of Foix ===
The Counts of Foix flourished from the 11th to the 15th century. They were at first feudatories of the counts of Toulouse and the counts of Barcelona, but after the latter's defeat in the Cathar Crusade they succeeded in establishing their direct vassalage to the king of France.

During the 13th and 14th centuries the counts of Foix figured among the most powerful of the French feudal nobles. Living on the borders of France, having constant interaction with the Kingdom of Navarre, and in frequent communication with England through Gascony and Aquitaine, they were in a position favorable to an assertion of independence, and acted more like the equals than the dependents of the kings of France.

The title of count of Foix was first assumed by Roger of Foix (died ca. 1064), son of Bernard-Roger of Couserans, who was a younger son of Roger I de Cominges, Count of Carcassonne, de Couserans et de Razés, when he inherited the town of Foix and the adjoining lands, which had hitherto formed part of the county of Carcassonne.

His grandson, Roger II, took part in the First Crusade in 1095 and was afterwards excommunicated by Pope Paschal II for seizing ecclesiastical property. Subsequently, he appeased the anger of the church through rich donations, and when he died in 1125 he was succeeded by his son, Roger III, and his son, Roger Bernard I.

Roger-Bernard's only son, Raymond Roger, accompanied the French king, Philip Augustus, to Palestine in 1190 and distinguished himself at the capture of Acre. He was afterwards engaged in the Albigensian Crusade defending the Cathars, and, on being accused of heresy, his lands were given to Simon de Montfort, 5th Earl of Leicester. Raymond Roger came to terms with the Church and recovered his estates before his death in 1223. He was a patron of the Provençal poets and a poet himself.

He was succeeded by his son, Roger Bernard II the Great, who assisted Raymond VII, Count of Toulouse, and the Albigenses in their resistance to the French kings, Louis VIII and Louis IX, was excommunicated on two occasions, and died in 1241.

His son, Roger IV, died in 1265 and was succeeded by his son, Roger Bernard III who, more famous as a poet than as a warrior, was taken prisoner both by Philip III of France and by Peter III of Aragon. He married Marguerite, daughter and heiress of Gaston VII, Viscount of Béarn, and he inherited Béarn and Nébouzan from his father-in-law in 1290, which led to the outbreak of a long feud between the Houses of Foix and Armagnac.

From 1278 the counts of Foix, and their legal successors, have also been Co-princes of Andorra.

=== House of Foix-Béarn ===
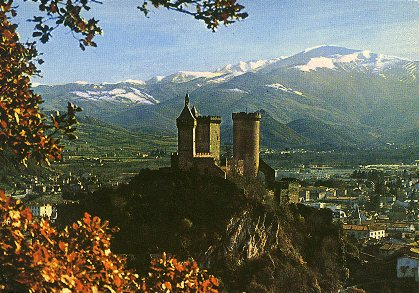
Castle of Foix towering above the town, with the Pyrenees behind.

The quarrel was continued under Roger Bernard's son and successor, Gaston I, who became count in 1302, inheriting both Foix and Béarn. Becoming embroiled with the French king, Philip IV, in consequence of the struggle with the count of Armagnac, Gaston was imprisoned in Paris. He quickly regained his freedom and accompanied King Louis X on an expedition into Flanders in 1315, and died on his return to France in the same year.

His eldest son, Gaston II, made peace with the house of Armagnac and took part in various wars both in France and Spain, dying at Seville in 1343, when he was succeeded by his young son, Gaston III.

Gaston III (1331–1391), called Phoebus, the Latin version of Apollo, on account of his beauty, was the most famous member of the House of Foix-Béarn. Like his father he assisted France in her struggle against England, being entrusted with the defence of the frontiers of Gascony.

When the French king, John II, favored the count of Armagnac, Gaston left his service and went to fight against the pagans of Prussia. Returning to France around 1357, he delivered some noble ladies from the attacks of the adherents of the Jacquerie at Meaux, and was soon at war with the count of Armagnac.

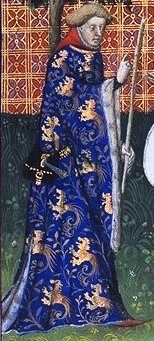
Gaston Phoebus, from an early 15th-century copy of his Livre de chasse, made in Paris and kept at the National Library of France.

During this struggle he also attacked the count of Poitiers, the royal representative in Languedoc, but owing to the intervention of Pope Innocent VI he made peace with the count in 1360. Gaston, however, continued to fight against the count of Armagnac, who, in 1362, was defeated and compelled to pay a ransom. This war lasted until 1377.

Early in 1380, the count was appointed governor of Languedoc, but when Charles VI succeeded Charles V as king later in the same year, this appointment was cancelled. Refusing, however, to heed the royal command, and supported by the communes of Languedoc, Gaston fought for about two years against John, duke of Berry, who had been chosen as his successor.

When he was bested in the combat, he abandoned the struggle and retired to his estates, remaining neutral and independent. He then resided in Orthez, the capital of Béarn. In 1348 Gaston married Agnes, daughter of Philip, Count of Evreux (d. 1343), by his wife Jeanne II, queen of Navarre. By Agnes, whom he divorced in 1373, he had an only son, Gaston, who is said to have been incited by his uncle, Charles II of Navarre, to poison his father, and who met his death in 1381. It is probable that he was killed by his father; this is the account presented by Froissart.

Gaston was very fond of hunting, but was not without a taste for art and literature. Several beautiful manuscripts are in existence which were executed by his orders, and he himself wrote a treatise on hunting, the Livre de chasse, known in English as The Hunting Book. Froissart, who gives a graphic description of his court and his manner of life at Orthez in Béarn, speaks enthusiastically of Gaston, saying: "I never saw one like him of personage, nor of so fair form, nor so well made, and again, in everything he was so perfect that he cannot be praised too much".

Left without legitimate sons, Gaston de Foix was easily persuaded to bequeath his lands to King Charles VI, who thus obtained Foix and Béarn when the count died at Orthez in 1391. Almost immediately after Gaston's death Charles granted the county of Foix to Matthew, Viscount of Castelbon, a descendant of Count Gaston I of Foix. When Matthew died without issue in 1398, his lands were seized by Archambault, Count of Grailly and Captal de Buch, the husband of Matthew's sister Isabella (d. 1426), who was confirmed as legitimate count of Foix in 1401.

=== House of Foix-Grailly ===

Archambault's eldest son, John (ca. 1382–1436), who succeeded to his father's lands and titles in 1412, had married Jeanne in 1402, daughter of Charles III, king of Navarre. Having served the king of France in Guyenne and the king of Aragon in Sardinia, John became the royal representative in Languedoc, when the old quarrel between Foix and Armagnac broke out again. During the struggle between the Burgundian party and the Armagnacs, he intrigued with both, and consequently was distrusted by the Dauphin, afterwards King Charles VII. Deserting the French cause, he then allied himself with Henry V of England. When Charles VII became king in 1423, he returned to his former allegiance and became the king's representative in Languedoc and Guyenne. He then assisted in suppressing the marauding bands which were devastating France, fought for Aragon against Castile, and aided his brother, the cardinal of Foix, to crush an insurgency in Aragon.

Peter, cardinal of Foix (1386–1464), was the fifth son of Archambault of Grailly, and was made archbishop of Arles in 1450. He took a prominent part in the struggle between the rival popes, and founded and endowed the Collège de Foix at Toulouse. The next count was John's son, Gaston IV of Foix, who married Leonora (died 1479), a daughter of John, king of Aragon and Navarre. In 1447 he bought the viscounty of Narbonne, and having assisted King Charles VII in Guyenne, he was made a peer of France in 1458. In 1455 his father-in-law designated him as his successor in Navarre, and Louis XI of France gave him the counties of Roussillon and Cerdagne, and made him his representative in Languedoc and Guyenne; but these marks of favor did not prevent him from joining a league against Louis in 1471.

His eldest son, Gaston, the husband of Madeleine, a daughter of Charles VII of France, died in 1470, and when Gaston IV died two years later, his lands descended to his grandson, Francis Phoebus (died 1483). Francis Phoebus became king of Navarre in 1479 and was succeeded by his sister Catherine (died 1517), the wife of Jean d'Albret (d. 1516).

A younger son of Count Gaston IV was John (died 1500), who received the viscounty of Narbonne from his father and married Marie, a sister of the French king Louis XII. He was on good terms both with Louis XI and Louis XII, and on the death of his nephew Francis Phoebus in 1483, claimed the kingdom of Navarre against Jean d'Albret and his wife, Catherine de Foix. The ensuing struggle lasted until 1497 when John renounced his claim. He left a son, Gaston de Foix (1489–1512), a distinguished French general, and a daughter, Germaine de Foix, who became the second wife of Ferdinand II of Aragon.

In 1507, Gaston exchanged his viscounty of Narbonne with King Louis XII of France for the duchy of Nemours, and as duke of Nemours he took command of the French troops in Italy. After delivering Bologna and taking Brescia, Gaston encountered the troops of the Holy League at Ravenna in April 1512 and routed the enemy, but was killed during the pursuit.

There were also younger branches of the house of Foix-Grailly: the viscounts of Lautrec (descended from Pierre de Foix, younger son of Jean III); the Counts of Candale and Benauges (descended from Gaston de Foix, a younger son of Archemboult and his son John de Foix, 1st Earl of Kendal); the Counts of Gurson and Fleix and Viscounts of Meille (Jean de Foix, Comte de Meille, Gurson et Fleix, was a younger son of Jean de Foix, Earl of Kendal), and the Counts of Caraman, or Carmain, descended from Isabeau de Foix, Dame de Navailles (only child of Archambaud de Foix-Grailly, Baron de Navailles) and her husband Jean, Vicomte de Carmain, whose descendants adopted the name and arms of Foix.

=== Houses of Albret and the House of Bourbon ===

When Catherine, wife of Jean d'Albret, succeeded her brother Francis Phoebus, the House of Foix-Grailly was merged into that of Albret, and later into that of Bourbon with Henry III of Navarre, son of Antoine de Bourbon and Jeanne d'Albret.

Henry III of Navarre became King Henry IV of France in 1589. In 1607, he united to the French crown his personal fiefs that were under French sovereignty (i.e. County of Foix, Bigorre, Quatre-Vallées, and Nébouzan, but not Béarn and Lower Navarre, which were sovereign countries outside of the kingdom of France), and so the county of Foix became part of the royal domain.

== See also ==
- Foix
- Castle of Foix
- Counts of Foix
- Arrondissement of Foix
