= Roman Catholic Diocese of Comminges =

Coordinates: 43.0269°N 0.5709°E

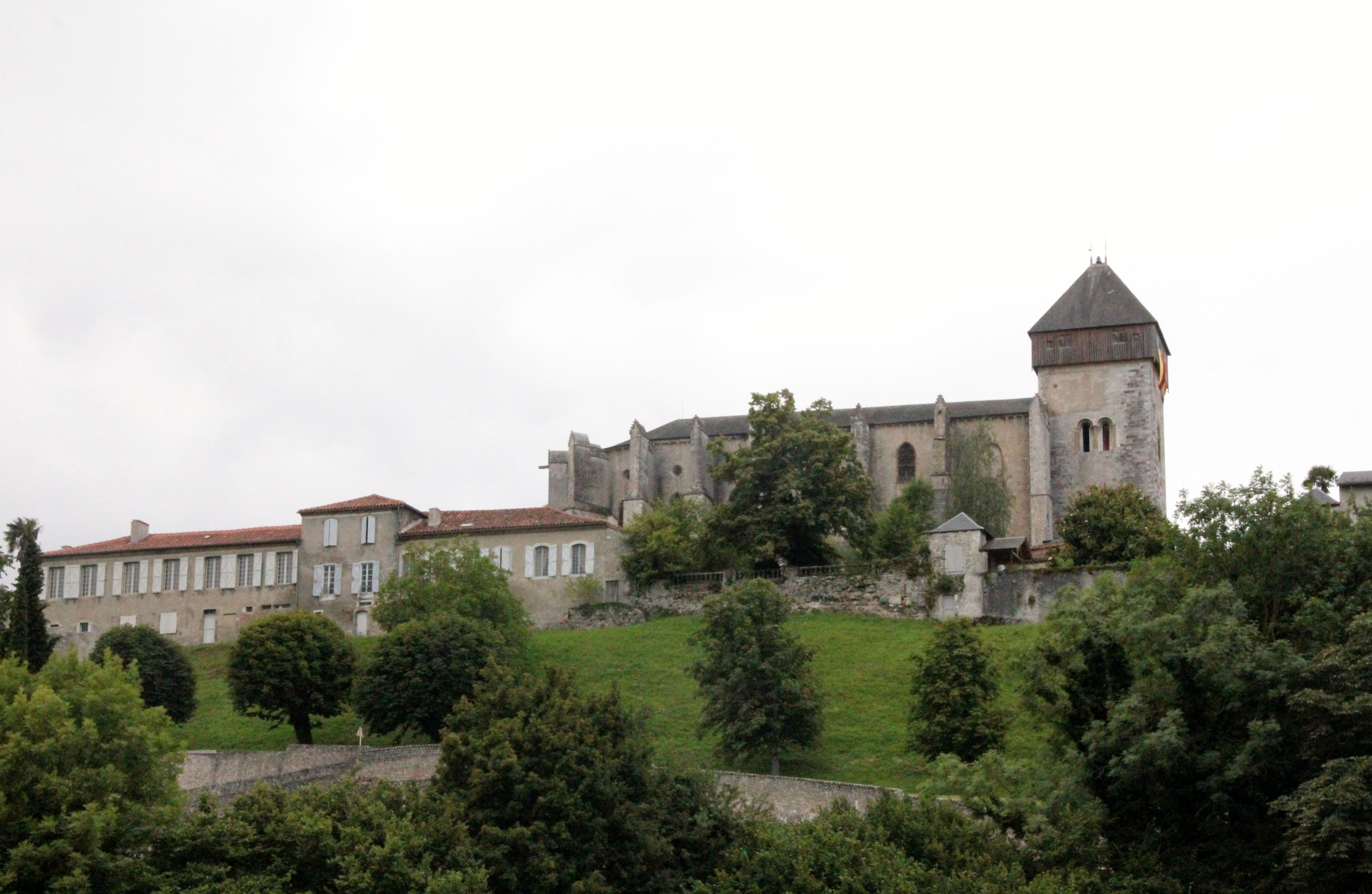
Saint-Bertrand-de-Comminges Cathedral

The former French Catholic diocese of Comminges existed at least from the sixth century, to the French Revolution. The seat of the bishops was at Saint-Bertrand-de-Comminges, now no more than a village, in the modern department of Haute-Garonne in south-west France. The territory of the old diocese now belongs to the archdiocese of Toulouse. The name of Comminges was incorporated into the titulature of the archbishop of Toulouse on 19 January 1935. He is now the archbishop of Toulouse-Saint Bertrand de Comminges-Rieux.

== History ==
The earliest Bishop of Comminges known by name is Suavis, who assisted at the Council of Agde in 506, along with thirty-four other bishops. Sidonius Apollinaris, however, writes of the death of a bishop of Comminges in 473.

Among the bishops of Comminges were:

- Bertrand of Comminges (1073–1123), grandson of William III, Count of Toulouse, previously archdeacon of Toulouse, who built the cathedral of Comminges and restored the town
- Bertrand de Goth (1295–99), who became pope under the name of Clement V.
- Bertrand de Cosnac (1352–72), created cardinal by Pope Gregory XI on 30 May 1371.
- Amelius de Lautrec (1384–90), created cardinal on 12 July 1385 by Pope Clement VII of the Avignon Obedience.
- Pierre de Foix (1422–64), cardinal from 1412–1413 to 1464.
- Cardinal Amanieu d'Albret, who was Bishop of Comminges (19 July 1499 – 1514, after 7 November)
- Cardinal Carlo Carafa (6 July 1556 – 4 March 1561), nephew of Pope Paul IV, he was arrested, tried, and executed by strangulation on orders of Pope Pius IV. Carafa was never ordained a priest or consecrated a bishop. He never took possession of his see.
- Urbain de Saint-Gelais, who in 1586, without outside assistance and with the help of a cannon which he caused to be brought from Toulouse, captured the town from the Huguenots.

In the church of St. Bertrand of Comminges (The gothic church is of the 14th century), baptism was administered with peculiar ceremonies: the baptismal water was placed in a silver dove with wings displayed (a symbol of the Holy Spirit), and enclosed in a cupola surmounting the font; at the moment of baptizing the dove was lowered over the head of the child by a pulley, and through its open beak the baptismal water was poured (as though grace from heaven).

== Bishops ==
=== To 1000 ===
- Suavis 506–?
- Presidius 533–?
- Amelius 549–?
- Rufin 584–588
- Abraham 788–?
- Involatus 879–?
- Oriol 980–?
- Bertrand Roger 990–?

=== 1000–1300 ===
- Peter I. 1003–?
- Arnaud I. 1035–?
- William I. 1040–1055
- Bernhard II. 1056–?
- William II. 1068–?
- Olger (Ulger) ?–1073?
- Saint Bertrand 1073–1126
- Roger de Nuro 1126?–1153?
- Arnaud Roger 1153–1176
- Arsius (Arsenius) 1179–1188
- Raymond Arnaud 1188–1205
- Sperague (Hisparigus) 1205–1206
- Adhémar du Châtel 1207–1209
- Garcias de Lorte 1210–1217
- Grimoard I. 1217–1240
- Arnaud III. Roger 1241–1260
- Guillaume III. d'Audiran 1260–1263
- Bertrand de Miramont 1263–1286
- Bertrand de Got 1295–1299
- Boso de Salignac 1299–1315

=== 1300–1500 ===
- Bernardus, O.P. (1316-1317)
- Pierre Vital de Millario 1317–1318
- Scot de Linières 1318–1325
- Guillaume de Cun 1325–1336
- Hugues de Castillon 1336–1351
- Bertrand de Cosnac 1352–1371 (Cardinal from 1371)
- Guillaume d'Espagne 6 June 1371 – 1382
- Amelius (Amelie) II. de Lautrec 1384–1390 (Cardinal from 1385)
- Menaud de Barbazan 1390–1421
- Pierre de Foix 7 August 1422 – 1451 (Cardinal from 1412 or 1413)
- Arnaud-Raymond V. d'Espagne 1451–146?
- Jean de Foix 9 May 1466 – 1499

=== From 1500 ===
- Amanieu d'Albret (19 July 1499 – 1514, after 7 November) (He never had possession).
  - Gaillard de l'Hospital 1502–1514 (contested election; Gaillard never received papal approval; he died in 1514)
- Louis Dourelle (Dourville) 8 January 1515 – 1523
- Jean de Mauléon 71 June 1523 – 1551
- Jean Bertrand 1551–1555
- Carlo Carafa, Administrator 1556–1561 (Cardinal, nephew of Pope Paul IV) (executed 6 March 1561)
- Pierre d'Albert 1561–1565
- Charles III de Bourbon 1569–1570
- Urbain de Saint-Gelais 1570–1613
- Gilles de Souvré 1614–1623
- Barthélemy de Donnadieu de Griet 1625–1637
- Hugues II. de Labatut 1638–1644
- Gilbert de Choiseul Duplessis Praslin 1644–1671
- Louis de Rechiègne Voisin de Guron 1671–1693
- Louis-François de Brezay de Denon-Ville 1693–1710
- Olivier-Gabriel de Lubières du Bouchet 1710–1740
- Antoine de Lastic 1740–1763
- Charles-Antoine-Gabriel d'Osmond de Médavy 1763–1785
- Antoine Eustache d'Osmond 1785–1801 (resigned)

== See also ==
- Catholic Church in France
- List of Catholic dioceses in France

== Bibliography ==
- Gams, Pius Bonifatius (1873). Series episcoporum Ecclesiae catholicae: quotquot innotuerunt a beato Petro apostolo. Ratisbon: Typis et Sumptibus Georgii Josephi Manz. (Use with caution; obsolete)
- Eubel, Conradus, ed. (1913). Hierarchia catholica, Tomus 1 (second ed.). Münster: Libreria Regensbergiana. (in Latin)
- Eubel, Conradus, ed. (1914). Hierarchia catholica, Tomus 2 (second ed.). Münster: Libreria Regensbergiana.
- Eubel, Conradus, ed. (1923). Hierarchia catholica, Tomus 3 (second ed.). Münster: Libreria Regensbergiana.
- Gauchat, Patritius (Patrice) (1935). Hierarchia catholica IV (1592-1667). Münster: Libraria Regensbergiana.
- Ritzler, Remigius; Sefrin, Pirminus (1952). Hierarchia catholica medii et recentis aevi V (1667-1730). Patavii: Messagero di S. Antonio.
- Ritzler, Remigius; Sefrin, Pirminus (1958). Hierarchia catholica medii et recentis aevi VI (1730-1799). Patavii: Messagero di S. Antonio.

=== Studies ===
- Agos, Louis de Fiancette d' (1854). Vie et miracles de Saint Bertrand. Avec une notice historique sur la Ville et les Evêques de Comminges: La Légende des Saints du pays et la description de l'Eglise Cathédrale (in French). Saint Gaudens: Imprimerie et librairie d'Abadie. [hagiography]
- Agos, Louis de Fiancette d' (1876). Notre-Dame de Comminges: monographie de l'ancienne cathédrale de Saint-Bertrand (in French). Saint-Gaudens: Abadie. [author of the "Litany of Saint-Bertrand", and other devotional texts]
- Marrast, Armand; Sacaze, Julien (1889). Histoire du Comminges de Saint Bertrand et Saint Gaudens (in French). Saint-Gaudens: L. Sabatier.
- Morel, J. P. M. (1852). Essais historique & pittoresque sur Saint-Bertrand de Comminges (in French). Toulouse: É. Privat.
- Lespinasse, Adeline et Pierre (1914). "Les eglises romanes et gothiques du Comminges". Revue de Comminges. 29: 9–35.

== See also ==
- The Cathedral of Saint-Bertrand-de-Comminges
- Munoz, Sarah (2009), "Cathédrale de Saint-Bertrand-de-Comminges: Notice historique" (in French)
