= Saint-Bertrand-de-Comminges =

Commune in Occitanie, France

- Commune
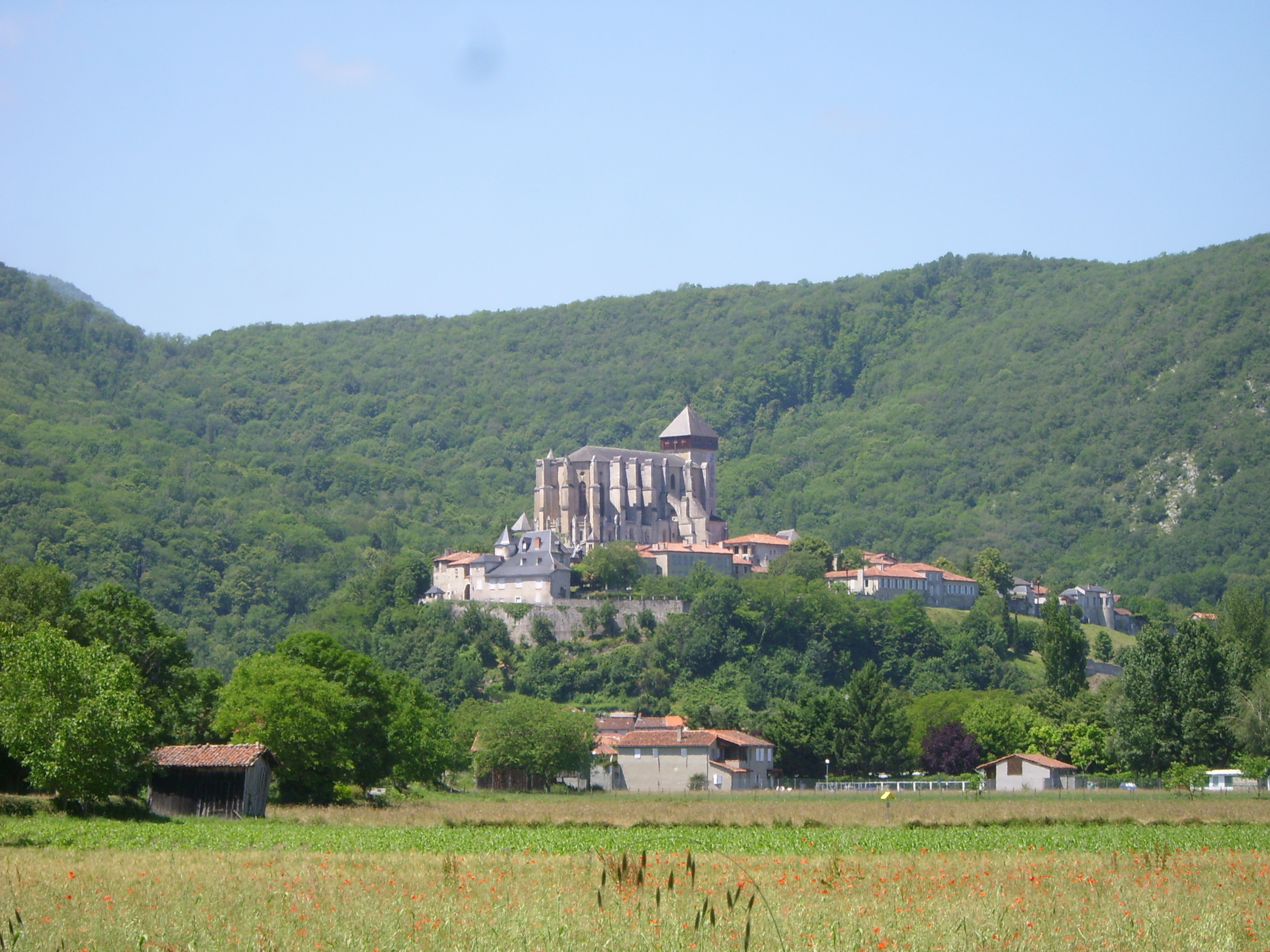
- Saint-Bertrand-de-Comminges Cathedral

- Coat of arms
- Location of Saint-Bertrand-de-Comminges
- Location within France Location within Occitanie
- Coordinates: 43°01′42″N 0°34′18″E
- Country: France
- Region: Occitania
- Department: Haute-Garonne
- Arrondissement: Saint-Gaudens
- Canton: Bagnères-de-Luchon

Government
  - Mayor (2020–2026): Marie-Claire Uchan
- Area^{1}: 11.17 km^{2} (4.31 sq mi)
- Elevation: 518 m (1,699 ft)
- Highest elevation: 1,016 m (3,333 ft)
- Lowest elevation: 421 m (1,381 ft)
- Population (2023): 243
  - Density: 21.8/km^{2} (56.3/sq mi)
- Time zone: UTC+01:00 (CET)
  - Summer (DST): UTC+02:00 (CEST)
- INSEE/Postal code: 31472 /31510
- ^{1} French Land Register data, which excludes lakes, ponds, glaciers > 1 km^{2} (0.386 sq mi or 247 acres) and river estuaries.

Saint-Bertrand-de-Comminges (French pronunciation: [sɛ̃ bɛʁtʁɑ̃ də kɔmɛ̃ʒ], literally Saint-Bertrand of Comminges; Gascon: Sent Bertran de Comenge) is a commune (municipality) and former episcopal see in the Haute-Garonne department in southwestern France. It is a member of the Les Plus Beaux Villages de France ("The Most Beautiful Villages of France") association.

== History ==
In 406, Saint Jerome wrote that the Roman General Pompey, while on the way back to Rome after a military campaign in Spain, founded a Roman colony there, presumably to defend the passage to the Aran Valley in the Pyrenees and the Iberian peninsula. However, extensive archaeological investigations have failed to find any evidence of this. The colony, built on the valley floor below the current hilltop village, was named Lugdunum Convenarum. This Roman town dates from the Augustan period and had reached around 30,000 people at its highest point. It belonged to the Roman province of Novempopulana and had a growing Christian community, which by the late fourth century got its own Diocese of Comminges, which was suffragan of the Metropolitan Archdiocese of Eauze. It is claimed to have been the place of exile from 39 AD of Herod Antipas, with his wife Herodias, under Emperor Caligula's orders, although this is based on an unclear point in Josephus. In 405 the Vandals sacked the city and forced the peasantry to move to the citadel.

In 585 another Germanic invasion, by the Burgundians under king Guntram, attacked the city in the course of their pursuit of Gundoald. It remained in decline for nearly five centuries. The bishopric however persisted under the name of Comminges and was transferred in the ninth century to the ecclesiastical province of the Metropolitan Archdiocese of Auch.

In 1083 a knight related to the Counts of Toulouse, Bertrand de l'Isle-Jourdain, canon of Saint Augustine in Toulouse, was nominated bishop of Comminges. He ordered the construction of the cathedral and of the Romanesque cloister. The place became used by pilgrims as a stage on the route to Santiago de Compostela.

Bertrand de l'Isle was canonised and became known as Saint-Bertrand in the 13th century and Lugdunum Convenarum became known as Saint-Bertrand-de-Comminges. The term Comminges itself comes from the Latin word "Convenae", meaning "those who came together" at Pompey's new settlement.

On 19 July 2012, during the 99th edition of Tour de France, it was one of the villages which cyclists passed by.

== Sights ==
In addition to the former cathedral, the village has a Romanesque basilica as well as Roman ruins. There is an archeological site close to the Cathedral in which it is possible to identify the remains of a Roman thermae and of a theatre.

The village itself is a medieval one, with several arches and vaults. It has several gates entering it; on the Cabirole Gate it is possible to read about the tax set by Louis XIV on fish. Another gate, the Majou Gate, is interesting in that it is the one pilgrims used. Following the ramparts it is possible to observe the Matacan Rock from which, according to the legend, Gondoald had been executed by Gunther.

=== Former cathedral ===
Entering the nave people will see three distinct architectural styles at the same time:

- the Romanesque part of the 12th century.
- the Gothic part of the 14th century commissioned by Bertrand de Goth.
- the Renaissance part as well as the organ from the sixteenth century.

The narthex ends by two huge pillars with a circumference of no less than 11.45m. Over the northern and southern walls one can see the Romanesque arches, the floors are made of marble and include some tombs and sepulchres. The choir is also clearly Romanesque and offers an impressive view over the entire valley.

The Gothic part is built in the Meridional Gothic style. There is a single nave that is 55m long, 16m wide and 28m tall. Over the arrow arches there are "coat of arms" from the founding bishops. The stained glasses are impressive by their level of details, almost comparable to those of Auch.

The cathedral in the Ville Haute dominating the Ville Basse

The stalls within the choir were commissioned by Jean de Mauléon but because of the lack of documentation it is impossible to name the artist that made them. Although and by comparison with other stalls it is often considered it was the work of Nicolas Bachelier, or rather of his school which had been using artists from France, Spain and Italy. Most of the work had been done in oak and walnut, the choir seems cut off from the rest of the church contrasting so much with the Gothic and Romanesque parts.

The sixty-seven stalls represent characters from both the Old and the New Testaments, including scenes like: temptation, envy and lust.

The former cathedral has been listed as a UNESCO World Heritage Site as part of the World Heritage Sites of the Routes of Santiago de Compostela in France.

== Population ==
Historical population
Year	Pop.	±% p.a.
1968	317	—
1975	251	−3.28%
1982	228	−1.36%
1990	217	−0.62%
1999	237	+0.98%
2007	255	+0.92%
2012	248	−0.56%
2017	244	−0.32%
2023	243	−0.07%
Source: INSEE

The inhabitants of the commune are known as Commingeois. This demonym and the name of the village refer to the ancient region, Comminges.

== Cultural references ==
The mediaeval scholar and ghost story writer M. R. James used Saint-Bertrand, and more particularly, its cathedral, as a setting for his classic tale of terror "Canon Alberic's Scrap-Book", which can be found in the collection Ghost Stories of an Antiquary (1904). The English composer Kaikhosru Shapurji Sorabji (1892–1988) wrote a piano piece inspired by James's story entitled St. Bertrand de Comminges: "He was laughing in the tower" (1941).

According to ancient Jewish historian Flavius Josephus (books Antiquities and Wars, combined information), Lugdunum Covenarum – then in the Roman province of Spain – was the place of exile of Herod Antipas, who had been the Tetrarch (ruler) of Galilee in the time of Jesus Christ. Herod and his wife Herodias were sent there under the orders of the Emperor Caligula in AD 39, and they remained there until their death about two years later. Confusion of this place with present-day Lyon, then also called Lugdunum, is still frequent nowadays, though the Hispanic reference makes this geographically impossible.

== Twin towns ==
- (Spain) Isábena, Since 2018

== See also ==
- Comminges
- Communes of the Haute-Garonne department
- List of Catholic dioceses in France
