= Jean V =

Jean V may refer to

- Jean V de Bretagne (1389–1442)
- Jean V of Armagnac (1420–1473)
- Jean V de Bueil (1406–1477)
