= Beatrice of Navarre, Countess of La Marche =

Beatrice of Navarre
- Countess of La Marche
- Born: 23 October 1386; Castile
- Died: 14 December 1407 (aged 21); Olite
- Spouse: James II, Count of La Marche
- Issue: Isabelle of Bourbon-La Marche; Marie of Bourbon-La Marche; Eleanor, Countess of Pardiac
- House: Évreux
- Father: Charles III of Navarre
- Mother: Eleanor of Castile

Beatrice of Navarre (1386–1407) was the first wife of James II, Count of La Marche but died young, leaving one daughter.

== Biography ==
Beatrice was a daughter of Charles III of Navarre and his wife, Eleanor of Castile. She was a member of the House of Évreux. Her surviving siblings were Blanche I of Navarre, wife of John II of Aragon, and Isabella of Navarre, wife of John IV of Armagnac.

In 1406 in Pamplona, Beatrice married James II, Count of La Marche, son of John I, Count of La Marche, and Catherine of Vendôme. The couple had:

- Eleanor of Bourbon-La Marche (Burlada, Sep 7, 1407 – aft. 21 August 1464), married Bernard d'Armagnac, Count of Pardiac (d. 1462)

Beatrice died, in childbirth, on Dec 14, 1407 in Olite.

== Sources ==
- Castro, José Ramón (1960). "El conde de la Marca y la guerra de Granada". Estudios Eclesiásticos. Revista de investigación e información teológica y canónica (in Spanish). 35 (Extra): 345–360. ISSN 2605-5147.
- Levasseur, Michel (2006). Histoire des d'Albret et des rois de Navarre (in French). Atlantica.
- Potter, David (1995). Keen, Maurice (ed.). A History of France, 1460–1560: The Emergence of a Nation State. New York: St. Martin's Press. ISBN 978-0312124809.
- Woodacre, Elena (2013). The Queens Regnant of Navarre: Succession, Politics, and Partnership, 1274-1512. London: Palgrave Macmillan. ISBN 978-1137339140.
