= Eleanor of Castile, Queen of Navarre =

Queen of Navarre from 1387 to 1415/16

Eleanor of Castile
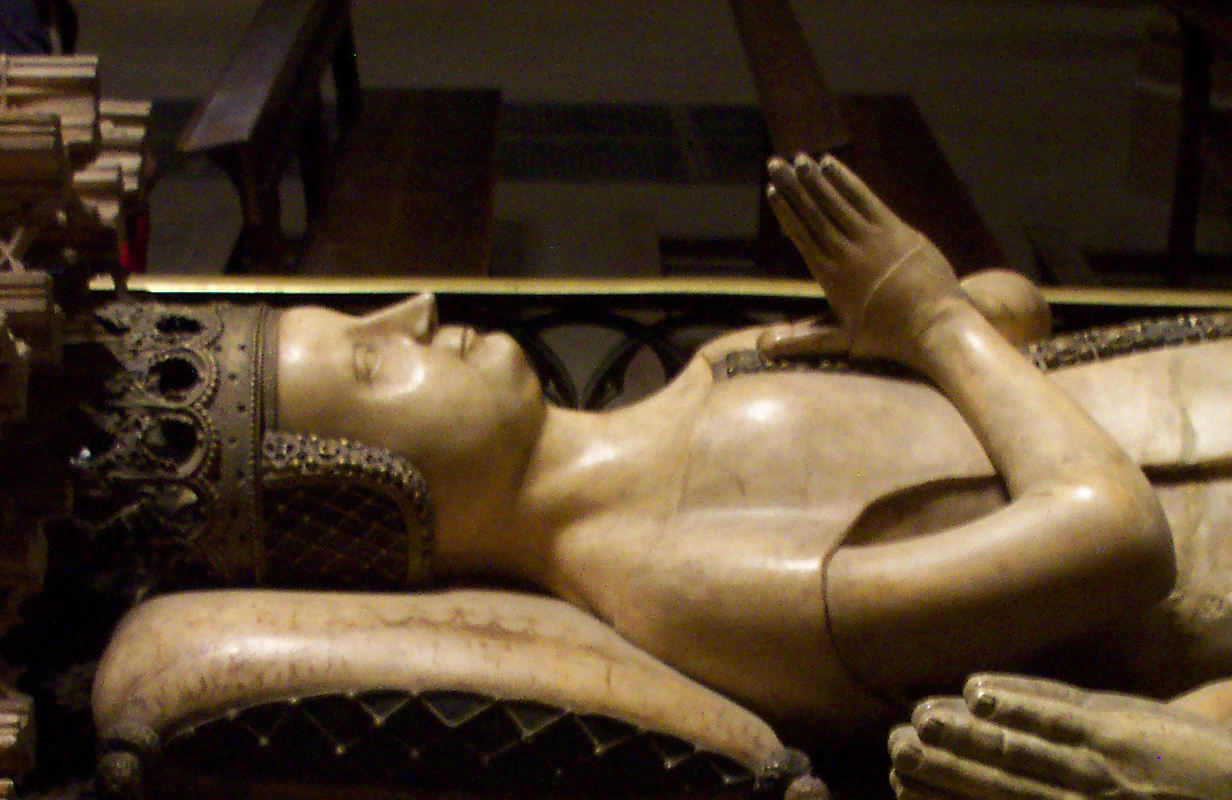

Queen consort of Navarre
- Tenure: 1387–1415/1416
- Coronation: 3 June 1403
- Born: c. 1363
- Died: 27 February 1415 or 5 March 1416 (aged 52 or 53); Pamplona or Olite
- Burial: Pamplona Cathedral
- Spouse: Charles III of Navarre
- Issue among others...: Joan, Countess of Foix; Blanche I of Navarre; Beatrice, Countess of La Marche; Isabella, Countess of Armagnac
- House: Trastámara
- Father: Henry II of Castile
- Mother: Juana Manuel of Castile

Eleanor of Castile (after 1363 – 1415/1416) was Queen of Navarre by marriage to King Charles III of Navarre. She acted as regent of Navarre during the absence of her husband in France in 1397–1398, 1403–1406 and 1409–1411.

== Biography ==
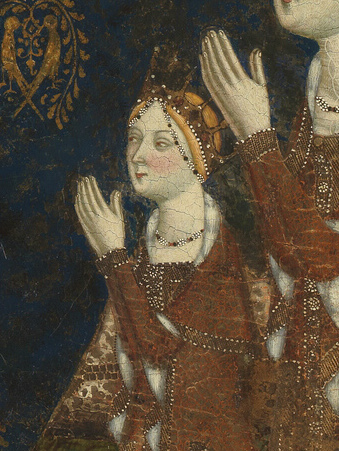
Depiction of Leonor as young infanta by Jaume Serra (c. 1375)

=== Early life ===
She was the daughter of King Henry II of Castile and his wife Juana Manuel of Castile, who was descended from a cadet branch of the Castilian royal house. Eleanor was a member of the House of Trastámara.

Eleanor was involved with plans to marry King Ferdinand I of Portugal in 1371, however he refused the match as he had secretly married the noblewoman Leonor Telles de Menezes.

She was betrothed in Burgos in 1373 to Prince Charles, the heir of King Charles II of Navarre. The couple was married at Soria in May 1375. A testament dated at Burgos on 29 May 1374 shows that King Henry II bequeathed property to his daughter Eleanor as a part of her dowry.

=== The Years in Castile ===
The marriage of Charles and Eleanor was marked by a number of unusual marital disputes. In 1388, Eleanor asked at a meeting between her husband and her brother John I of Castile for permission to retire for some time to her homeland of Castile in order to recover from an illness caught in Navarre. She believed this course of action would be best for her health. The two young daughters in her care at the time went with her. During their absence from Navarre, Eleanor and her children resided in Valladolid. By 1390, Eleanor bore two more daughters to Charles, and two years later, her husband requested her to return to Navarre because both of them needed to be crowned King and Queen of Navarre upon the death of her father-in-law King Charles II. Eleanor's brother King John supported the request of Charles III. Eleanor did not consent, claiming that she was ill-treated in Navarre and believed members of the Navarrese nobility wished to poison her. As a result, Eleanor remained in Castile while her husband was crowned in February 1390 in Pamplona. By the end of the 1390s, Eleanor had born her husband six daughters, all of whom survived infancy, but no sons. For this reason, Eleanor handed her oldest daughter Joanna over to Charles III to be groomed for her future role as ruler of the Kingdom of Navarre.

On 9 October 1390, Eleanor's brother John died and was succeeded by his minor son Henry as king of Castile. Charles then requested Eleanor's return to Navarre again, but she refused once more. Eleanor opposed her nephew Henry's accession and she formed the League of Lillo along with her illegitimate half-brother Fadrique and her cousin Pedro. King Henry opposed the League, besieged Eleanor in her castle at Roa around mid-1394, and obliged her to return to her husband in February 1395.

=== Queen of Navarre ===
Eleanor became very involved in the political life of Navarre upon her return. Her relationship with her husband improved, and they had the long-awaited sons Charles and Louis. Both died young, however. On 3 June 1403, her coronation as Queen of Navarre took place in Pamplona. Upon several occasions when Charles stayed in France, Eleanor took to the role of regent. She also helped to maintain good relations between Navarre and Castile. As a result of these good relations, members of the Castilian nobility, including the Duke of Benavente and members of the powerful families of Dávalos, Mendoza and Zuñiga, settled in Navarre.

Upon the couple's absences, their daughter Joanna acted as regent, as she was heiress to the kingdom. Joanna died in 1413 without issue and in the lifetime of both her parents, therefore the succession turned to their second daughter Blanche, who would eventually succeed as Queen of Navarre upon Charles' death.

There is confusion surrounding Eleanor's death. She is believed to have died at Olite on 27 February 1415 or at Pamplona 5 March 1416. Her husband died in 1425, and they were buried together in a monumental tomb at Pamplona in the Cathedral of Santa María la Real.

== Issue ==
The coat of arms of Eleanor as Queen of Navarre

Eleanor and Charles had nine children, five of which lived to adulthood:

- Joan (1382–1413), married John I, Count of Foix, no issue.
- Maria (1383 or 1384–1406), died unmarried and childless.
- Blanche (1385-1441), married John II of Aragon, became Queen of Navarre and had issue; they were maternal great-great-great-great-grandparents of King Henry IV of France.
- Beatrice (1392–1412), married to James II, Count of La Marche, and had issue.
- Daughter, twin sister of Beatrice, who died young
- Isabella (1395–1435), married in 1419 to John IV of Armagnac, had issue; they were paternal great-great-great-grandparents of King Henry IV of France.
- Charles (1397–1402), Prince of Viana, died young
- Louis (1402), Prince of Viana, died young
- Margaret (1403), died young

== Sources ==
- Borrás Gualis, Gonzalo M. (2014). "La Virgen de Tobed. Exvoto dinástico de los Trastámara" (PDF). In Escribano Paño, María Victoria; Duplá Ansuátegui, Antonio; Sancho Rocher, Laura; Villacampa Rubio, María Angustias (eds.). Miscelánea de estudios en homenaje a Guillermo Fatás Cabeza. Zaragoza: Institución Fernando el Católico. pp. 167–176. ISBN 978-84-9911-302-9.
- Merriman, Roger Bigelow (1918). The Rise of the Spanish Empire in the Old and in the New. Vol. 1. The Macmillan Company.
- Woodacre, Elena (2013). The Queens Regnant of Navarre. Palgrave Macmillan.

Eleanor of Castile, Queen of Navarre House of Trastámara Born: after 1363 Died: 1415/1416
Royal titles
| Preceded by Joan of Valois | Queen consort of Navarre; 1387–1415/1416 | Succeeded by Agnes of Cleves |
