= Isabella of Navarre, Countess of Armagnac =

Isabella of Navarre
- Countess of Armagnac
- Born: 1395; Kingdom of Navarre
- Died: 31 August 1450 (aged 54–55)
- Spouse: John IV of Armagnac
- Issue: Marie, Duchess of Alençon; John V of Armagnac; Eleanor, Princess d'Orange, Lady of Arlay and Arguel; Charles, Viscount of Fézensaguet; Isabella, Lady of the Four-Valleys
- House: Évreux
- Father: Charles III of Navarre
- Mother: Eleanor of Castile

Isabella of Navarre (1395 – 31 August 1450) was the younger surviving daughter of Charles III of Navarre and his wife Eleanor of Castile. She was a member of the House of Évreux.

== Early life and family ==
Shortly before Isabella's birth, her mother was dealing with problems in Castile, involving her brother John I of Aragon. Eleanor was forced to return to Navarre for her daughter's birth.

Isabella was the sixth of eight children. Her two younger brothers died in childhood, leaving Isabella and her five older sisters. Her sisters included: Joanna (died before inheriting the throne), Blanche (successor of their father), and Beatrice.

== Marriage ==
Isabella was firstly betrothed to Infante John of Aragon around 1414. Her mother, Queen Eleanor bequeathed her money for the marriage. John later became King of Aragon but broke off his contract with Isabella, in hopes of marrying Joanna II of Naples.

Isabella eventually married on 10 May 1419 John IV of Armagnac. This marriage was John's second marriage, after the death of his first wife Blanche of Brittany, who had left no sons.

Isabella and John had:

- Marie of Armagnac (b. 1420–1473), married in 1437 John II of Alençon (b. 1409–1476), Duke of Alençon; maternal great-grandparents of King Henry IV of France.
- John V of Armagnac (b. 1420–1473), Viscount of Lomagne, then Count d' Armagnac, of Fézensac and Rodez. He married illegally to younger sister Isabella, had issue and married secondly to Joan of Foix, also with issue.
- Eleanor (b. 1423–1456), married in 1446 Louis de Chalon (b. 1389; † 1463), Prince d'Orange, Lord of Arlay and Arguel, had issue
- Charles I (b. 1425–1497), Viscount of Fézensaguet, then Count d' Armagnac, of Fézensac and Rodez
- Isabella (b. 1430–1476), Lady of the Four-Valleys, married illegally to brother John and had issue.

Isabella and her husband both died in 1450; she died in August and he died three months later in November, she was around fifty-four at the time of death.

== Ancestry ==
Ancestors of Isabella of Navarre, Countess of Armagnac

16. Louis, Count of Évreux
8. Philip III of Navarre
17. Margaret of Artois
4. Charles II of Navarre
18. Louis X of France
9. Joan II of Navarre
19. Margaret of Burgundy
2. Charles III of Navarre
20. Philip VI of France
10. John II of France
21. Joan the Lame
5. Joanna of Valois
22. John of Bohemia
11. Bonne of Bohemia
23. Elisabeth of Bohemia
1. Isabella of Navarre
24. Ferdinand IV of Castile
12. Alfonso XI of Castile
25. Constance of Portugal
6. Henry II of Castile
26. Pedro Núñez de Guzmán
13. Eleanor of Guzman
27. Beatriz Ponce de León
3. Eleanor of Castile
28. Manuel of Castile
14. Juan Manuel, Prince of Villena
29. Beatrice of Savoy
7. Juana Manuel of Castile
30. Fernando de la Cerda
15. Blanca de La Cerda y Lara
31. Juana Núñez de Lara

== Sources ==
- Pernoud, Régine; Clin, Marie-Véronique (1999). Joan of Arc: Her Story. Translated by Adams, Jeremy duQuesnay. St. Martin's Press.
- Woodacre, Elena (2013). The Queens Regnant of Navarre: Succession, Politics, and Partnership, 1274-1512. Palgrave Macmillan.
