= Charles, Count of Armagnac =

Charles, Count of Armagnac may refer to:

- Charles I, Count of Armagnac (r. 1473–1497)
- Charles IV, Duke of Alençon and Count of Armagnac (r. 1509–1525)
- Charles de Lorraine, Count of Armagnac (r. 1718–1751)
