= John IV of Armagnac =

French nobleman (1396–1450)

John IV
- Count of Armagnac
- Born: 15 October 1396
- Died: 5 November 1450 (aged 54)
- Noble family: Armagnac
- Spouses: Blanche of Brittany; Isabella d' Évreux
- Issue more...: Marie, Duchess of Alençon; John V of Armagnac; Charles I of Armagnac
- Father: Bernard VII of Armagnac
- Mother: Bonne de Berry

John IV (15 October 1396 – 5 November 1450) was Count of Armagnac, Fézensac, and Rodez from 1418 to 1450. He was involved in the intrigues related to the Hundred Years' War and in conflicts against the King of France.

== Biography ==
Born on 15 October 1396, John was the son of Bernard VII of Armagnac, Count d' Armagnac, of Fézensac, Pardiac, and Rodez; and Bonne of Berry. Upon the murder of his father on 12 June 1418 by a mob, John became count of Armagnac.

John's father had taken the County of Comminges by force, but John could not prevent the second marriage of Margaret to Matthew of Foix in 1419. Subsequently, they retook the County of Comminges.

In 1425, John recognized the King of Castile as overlord of Armagnac. The French king, Charles VII, who was occupied fighting the English, could not intervene, but did not overlook the affront. His conflict with Charles VII encouraged him to seek a rapprochement with the latter's enemies, namely the English. In July 1437, both John and King Henry VI of England signed a treaty, one of the terms being that Armagnac would not allow his subjects to act with hostility towards the English.

John took part in the Praguerie (1440) of the barons and the Dauphin of France, but the coalition was overcome by Charles VII, who pardoned the insurrectionists.

John started negotiations for a marriage between one of his daughters and Henry VI of England in 1442. John sought a strong alliance that would protect him from threats by Charles VII, while the English sought to use his lands as a defensive buffer zone against French attacks. His strategically located territories in southwestern France made him much better positioned to defend Gascony than the English crown. "...the count of Armagnac was said to have offered a huge dowry in money, lands and men to help defend the borders of Gascony." John seems to have stalled the negotiations as he evaluated whether allying with the English or attempting a reconciliation with Charles VII was the best idea. Regardless, threats from his overlord, coupled with indecisiveness on the part of the English, the marriage negotiations came to an end.

John, besieged in L'Isle-Jourdain by Dauphin Louis, was captured and imprisoned in Carcassonne in 1444. He was pardoned three years later, but his counties were directed by royal officers.

== Marriages and children ==
John married Blanche of Brittany (1395–1419), daughter of Duke John IV of Brittany and Joan of Navarre, on 16 June 1407 and had a daughter, Bonne (b. 1416; † before 1448).

Shortly after the death of Blanche of Brittany, he married on 10 May 1419 his first wife's first cousin Isabella (b. 1395; † 1450), daughter of King Charles III of Navarre and Eleanor of Castille. They had:

- Marie of Armagnac (b. 1420; † 1473), married in 1437 John II of Alençon (1409–1476), Duke of Alençon. Her grandson Charles IV, Duke of Alençon, eventually received the Armagnac inheritance.
- John V of Armagnac (b. 1420; † 1473), Viscount of Lomagne, then Count of Armagnac, of Fézensac and Rodez.
- Eléonore (b. 1423; † 1456), married in 1446 Louis II of Chalon-Arlay (b. 1389; † 1463), Prince d'Orange, Lord of Arlay and Arguel
- Charles I, Count of Armagnac (b. 1425; † 1497), Viscount of Fézensaguet, then Count d' Armagnac, of Fézensac and Rodez
- Isabelle (c. 1430 (Note: According to Mathieu d'Escouchy, she was aged 22 in 1455. If his statement is correct, she would have been born in 1432 or 1433, strictly speaking.) – 1476), Lady of the Four-Valleys

== Sources ==
- Adams, Tracy (2014). Christine de Pizan and the Fight for France. Pennsylvania State University Press.
- de La Borderie, Arthur; Pocquet, Barthélemy (1906). Histoire de Bretagne. Vol. 4. H. Vatar.
- des Noes, François Bouvier (2004). Procédures politiques du règne de Louis XI: le procès de René d'Alençon, comte du Perche, 1481-1483 (in French). Vol. 1. Atelier national de reproduction des thèses.
- Pernoud, Régine; Clin, Marie-Véronique (1999). Joan of Arc: Her Story. Translated by Adams, Jeremy duQuesnay. St. Martin's Press.
- Samaran, C. (1907). "Isabelle d'Armagnac, dame des Quatre-Vallées" (PDF). Revue des Hautes-Pyrénées (in French). 2: 97–115, 140–149, 171–178).
- Samaran, Charles (1907b). La maison d'Armagnac au XVe siècle et les dernières luttes de la féodalité dans le Midi de la France (in French). Librairie Alphonse Picard et Fils.
- Saygin, Susanne (2002). Humphrey, Duke of Gloucester (1390-1447) and the Italian Humanists. Brill.
- Vale, M.G.A. (1974). Charles VII. University of California Press.
- Wolffe, Bertram (2001). Henry VI. Yale University Press.

Preceded by Bernard VII	Count of Armagnac; 1418–1450	Succeeded by John V
