= Mascarose I of Armagnac =

Mascarose I of Armagnac (died 1246), was a Countess regnant suo jure of Armagnac and Fézensac in 1245-1246.
