= Tomb of Charles III of Navarre and Eleanor of Castile =

Charles III's tomb

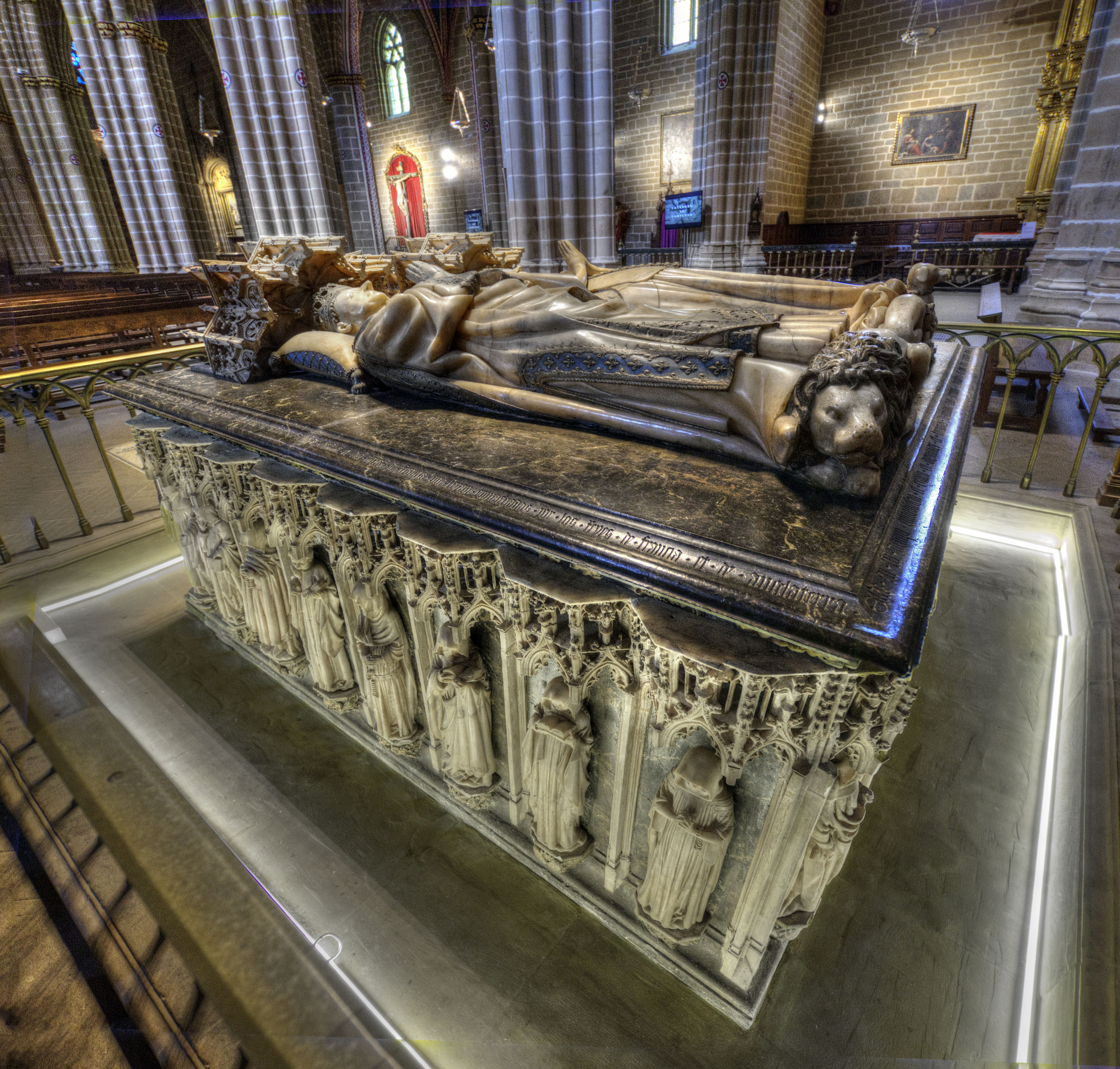
Tomb in situ

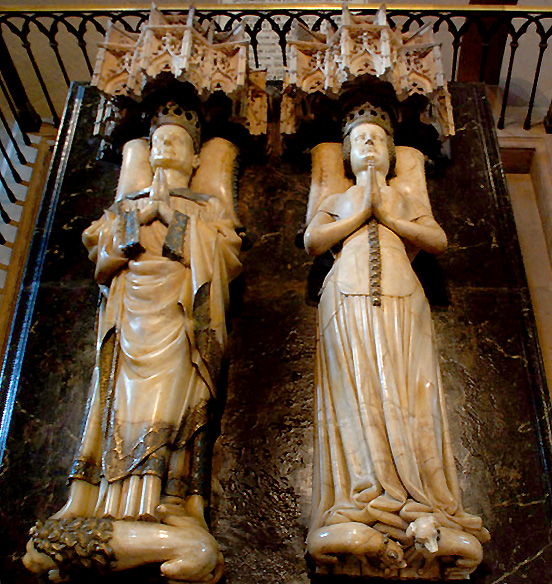
Top view

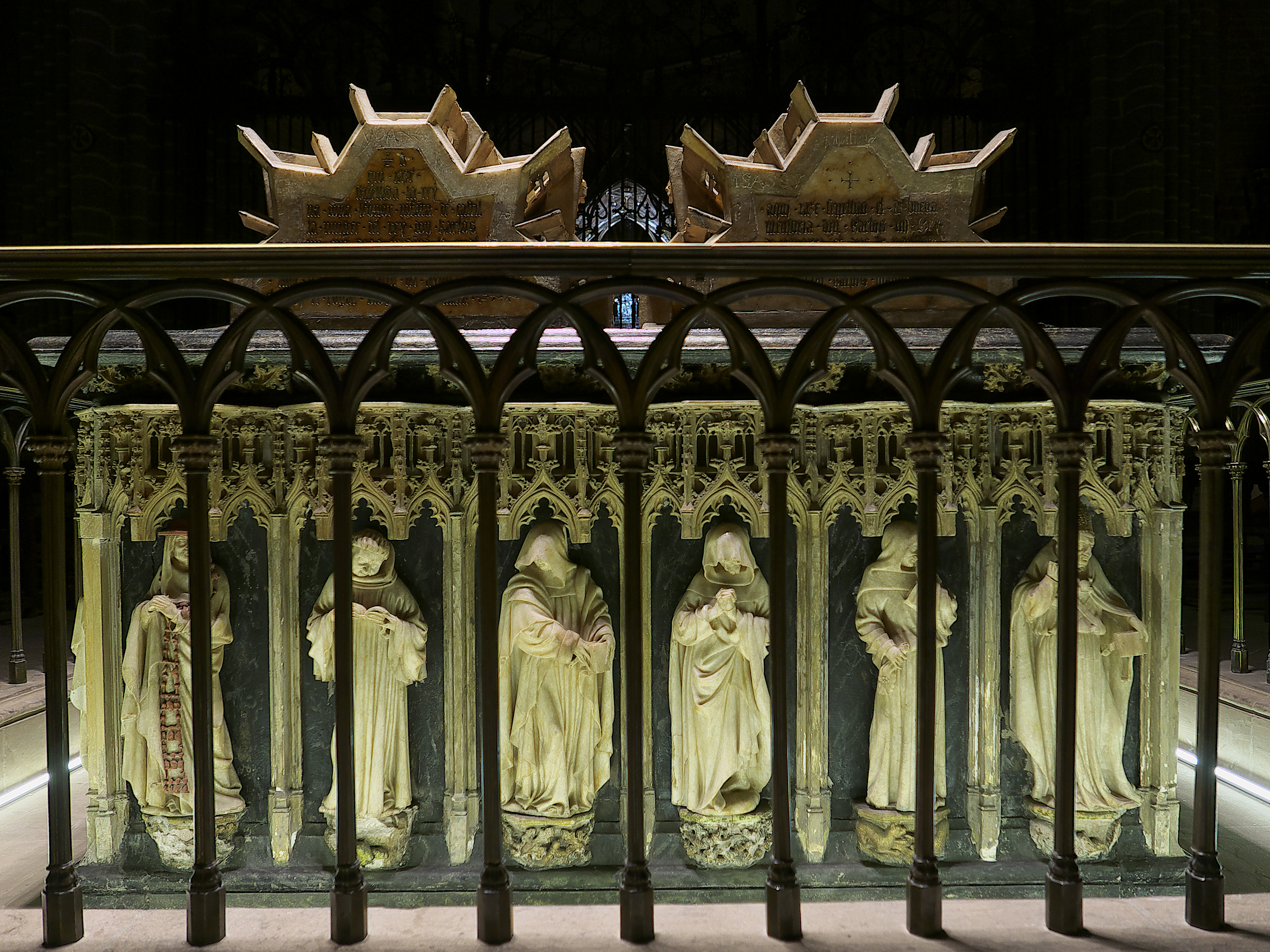
Side view: mourners

The monumental tomb of King Charles III of Navarre and his queen, Eleanor of Castile, in Pamplona Cathedral was constructed in the Gothic style between late 1413 and mid-1419. The work by a team of craftsmen from France, Burgundy and the Burgundian Netherlands was overseen by Johan Lome.

The tomb sparked a fad for funerary monuments in Navarre, which had been rare up to that time. Charles III's freestanding bed, however, was not imitated, later monuments being of the arcosolium variety.

== Artists ==
The names of seven men who worked on the tomb under Lome are known. Many of them are described in documents as "French". Two, Michel and Collin, were from Reims. Michel de Reims, a painter, came to Navarre with Lome in 1411. He and Anequín de Sora were the most important collaborators. The others were Viçent Huyart, Johan de Lille from Flanders, Johan de La Garnie from Picardy and a certain Johan from Burgundy.

== Description ==
The design of the tomb was inspired by the tomb of Charles V of France and Joanna of Bourbon, which was designed by André Beauneveu and Jean de Liège, and the tomb of Philip the Bold, Duke of Burgundy, which was designed by Claus Sluter. It is a freestanding structure, constructed of sandstone and alabaster. Green and white paint have been used to make the sandstone bed appear like marble. There are some touches of coloured paint and gilding, but the precious stones which once existed are lost.

Statues of the king and queen are recumbent atop the false marble slab. They are both crowned with their heads resting on pillows beneath Gothic canopies. The king is wearing his coronation robes and his feet rest on a lion, a symbol of strength. His face is thought to be a portrait. The queen is wearing fashionable clothes and her feet rest on two dogs fighting over a bone, "an allusion to human life gnawed by time." Her face is idealized and does not seem to be a portrait.

The base of the tomb is covered in carved mourners (plorantes) representing the funeral procession. These include cardinals, bishops, canons, monks and laymen in complementary pairs. They have sometimes been taken to represent contemporary persons, but Clara Fernández-Ladreda Aguadé considers this unlikely.

== Epitaphs ==
The tomb has two carved and gilded Romance epitaphs in Gothic script on the top of the canopies. That for Charles III also extends around the edge of the table. It mentions his descent from Charlemagne and Saint Louis while extolling his recovery of "a great part of boroughs and castles of his kingdom which were in the hands of the king of Castile", his recovery of his patrimony in France that had been confiscated, his building projects and how he "ennobled and exalted [many] who were his subjects."

The epitaph for the queen is much shorter. She is described as "a very good queen, wise and devout". In both epitaphs Charles is numbered IIII (a variant of the Roman numeral IV), which is probably best explained by the reference to Charlemagne, who ruled over part of Navarre and may have been considered the first Charles. The death dates of the king and queen, however, appear to be in error in both epitaphs. This probably indicates that they are later additions to the tomb.
