= John V of Armagnac =

French noble (1420–1473)

John V
- Count of Armagnac
- Countship: Armagnac
- Predecessor: John IV
- Successor: Charles I
- Born: 1420
- Died: 6 March 1473 (aged 52–53)
- Wife: (1) Isabelle, Lady of the Four-Valleys (marriage illegal) (2) Joan of Foix
- Father: John IV
- Mother: Isabella of Navarre

John V (French: Jean; 1420 – 6 March 1473) was the penultimate count of Armagnac of the older branch. He was the son of John IV of Armagnac and Isabella of Navarre.

== Life ==
Styled viscount of Lomagne while his father lived, John succeeded him as count of Armagnac when he died (5 November 1450); soon after, he started a relationship with his sister Isabelle, lady of the Four-Valleys (Dame des Quatre-Vallées), ten years his junior, whom the chronicler Mathieu d'Escouchy accounted one of the great beauties of France and whose betrothal to Henry VI of England had been under consideration. When word got out that two boys (John and Anthony) had been born in the castle of Lectoure, the couple promised to reform their incestuous behavior. But within a few months, John solemnized the union between the two by claiming to have obtained a papal dispensation from Pope Callixtus III, shortly after their third child, a daughter called Rose (or Mascarose), was born.

Other serious breaches ensued: John refused to seat a bishop of Auch selected by the King and assented to by the Pope, installing an illegitimate half-brother of his in the seat. Events came to a head in May 1455. Authorities were alerted, and a brief was issued for John's arrest, when an investigation revealed that he had forced a forged dispensation out of Antoine d'Alet, Bishop of Cambrai, a magistrate in the court of Rome. Tried in absentia in 1460 before a parlement of Charles VII, he was convicted of lese-majeste, rebellion and incest. Forces were sent to capture him but he escaped punishment by fleeing to his cousins in Aragon. Though he pleaded his case in Rome, the couple were separated and the sons declared bastards and barred from inheritance.

Within a few years a new King of France, Louis XI, reinstated John in his domains, where John rashly undid his father's acts and broke faith with his promises. Betraying Louis, Armagnac was part of the league that called themselves Bien public and threatened Paris at the head of 6,000 mounted men. In 1469, Louis responded, under the pretense that John was treating with ambassadors from England, and sent an army under Antoine de Chabannes to rout him. John fled to Spain, only to reappear in 1471 in the train of the king's rebellious brother, the duc de Guyenne. Louis had John besieged in his stronghold of Lectoure. John opened the gates of the city on 5 March 1473 but he died the next day, stabbed by men-at-arms.

The title of Count of Armagnac passed, first fruitlessly to his younger brother Charles I, Count of Armagnac, and in 1497 to his cousin of the cadet branch, Armagnac-Nemours.

== Marriage and heirs ==
His union with his sister Isabelle of Armagnac (b. 1430 - d. Castelnau, 4 August 1476), produced three children:

1. John of Armagnac (d. 1516), Seigneur of Camboulas, married in 1507 with Jeanne de La Tour. No issue.
2. Anthony of Armagnac (d. ca. 1516), called the "Bâtard d'Armagnac". Unmarried and without issue.
3. Rose (or Mascarose) of Armagnac (d. 1526), married in 1498 with Gaspard II de Villemur, Seigneur of Montbrun. She had issue.

In Lectoure on 19 August 1469, John married Joan (b. aft. 1454 - d. Pau, aft. 10 February 1476), daughter of Count Gaston IV of Foix and Queen Eleanor of Navarre, later monarch of Navarre. Pregnant at the time of her husband's death, Joan was transported to the castle of Buzet-sur-Tarn and lived still several years, contrary to Père Anselme's suggestion that she died after being forced to drink "a potion" (Note: "un breuvage") which made her give birth to a stillborn child in ca. April 1473 so that the "race of the Count could be ended". (Note: "il ne restât aucun de la race du comte")

== Quotes ==
A contemporary chronicler described him:

"Fire ran in his veins. He was as violent in his desires as imperious in his actions. His physical aspect was not seductive: short and stocky of stature, even pot-bellied, but gifted with great bodily strength. His neck was short, sumounted with an acne-pocked ("bourgeonné") visage, with squinty eyes, crowned by a shock of red hair."

Preceded by John IV	Count of Armagnac; 1450–1473	Succeeded by Charles I
