= Pamplona Cathedral =

Cathedral in Pamplona, Spain

Cathedral of Saint Mary of the Assumption Catedral de Santa María de la Asunción
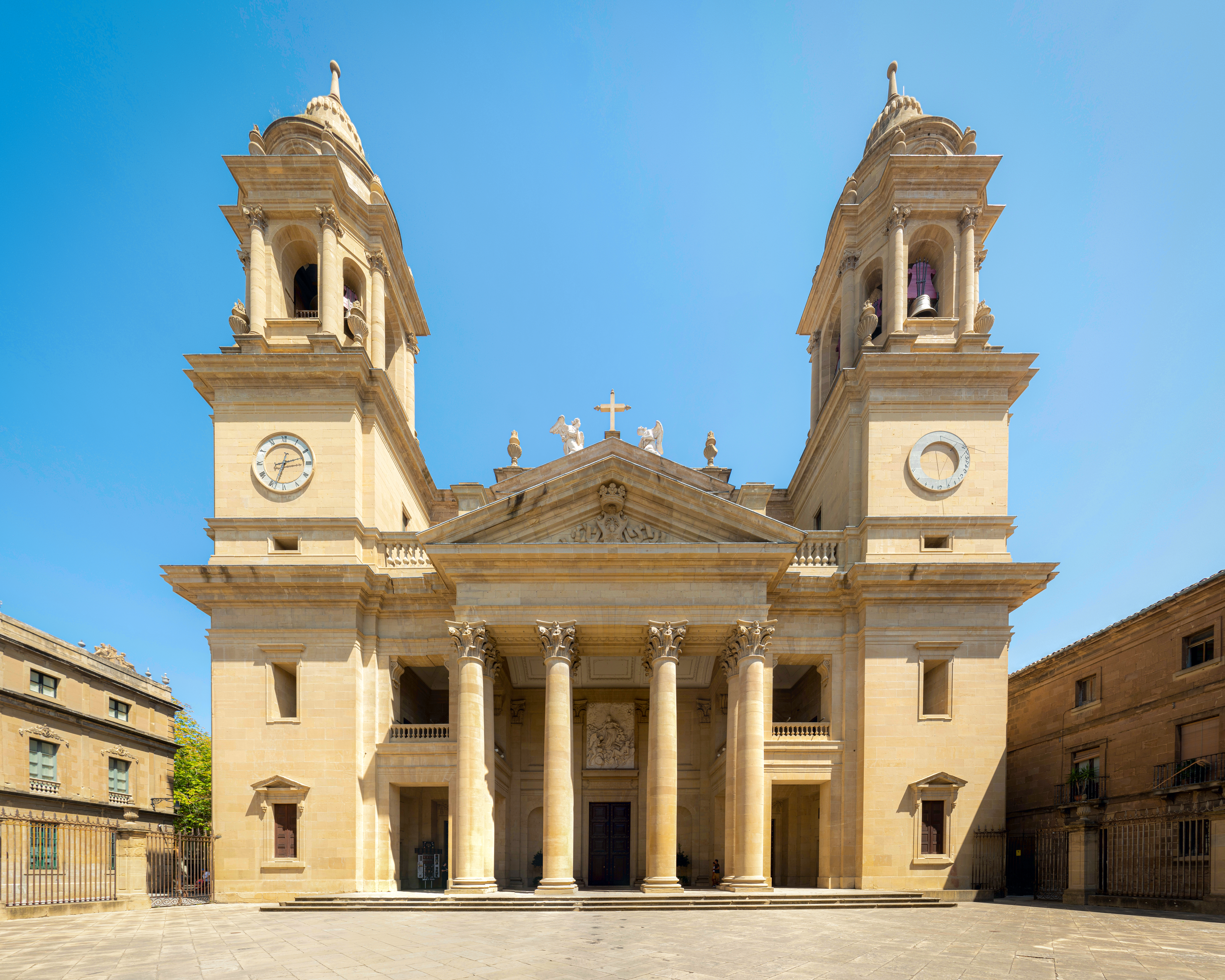
- Pamplona Cathedral

Religion
- Affiliation: Roman Catholic Church
- Diocese: Archdiocese of Pamplona y Tudela
- Rite: Roman
- Ecclesiastical or organisational status: Cathedral

Location
- Location: Pamplona, Spain
- Interactive map of Cathedral of Saint Mary of the Assumption; Catedral de Santa María de la Asunción
- Coordinates: 42°49′11″N 1°38′28″W

Architecture
- Type: Church
- Style: Neoclassical, Gothic, Romanesque, Baroque, Renaissance

Pamplona Cathedral or Cathedral of Saint Mary of the Assumption is a Roman Catholic church in the archdiocese of Pamplona, Spain. The current 15th century Gothic church replaced an older Romanesque one. Archaeological excavations have revealed the existence of another two earlier churches. The Neoclassical façade was designed by Ventura Rodríguez in 1783. It has a 13th-14th-century Gothic cloister that provides access to two other Gothic rooms: the Barbazan chapel and the refectory. The Mediaeval kings of Navarre were crowned and some also buried there. The Navarrese Cortes (Parliament) was held there during the early modern ages.

Since its foundation the church has been dedicated to the invocation of Santa María de la Asunción (Saint Mary of the Assumption), whose feast is celebrated on 15 August. It is possible that, due to a metonymy phenomenon, the ownership of the building has been associated with the titular image of the temple, Santa María la Real.

José Goñi Gaztambide – a historian specialized in the episcopal history of the diocese of Pamplona – explains, in part, the matter by echoing the petition made in 1905 to the council by the chaplain, Mariano Arigita Lasa, a relevant figure who became archivist of the Navarra Provincial Council, the Pamplona City Council and the cathedral. Arigita had initially requested to return the "primitive title" of Santa María la Real de Pamplona. Goñi Gaztambide's reply read like this:

Regarding the first point, it should be pointed out that the original title was Santa María de Pamplona. The one of Santa María la Real de Pamplona has never been documented. (from the Spanish quote «Respecto al primer punto conviene puntualizar que el título primitivo fue Santa María de Pamplona. Jamás se encuentra documentado el de Santa María la Real de Pamplona.»)

— José Goñi Gaztambide, La catedral de Pamplona

Following the Canonical Coronation of Santa María de Pamplona, on 21 September 1946, "the title became popular Santa María la Real de Pamplona which does not mean that it was his true dedication."

== Church ==
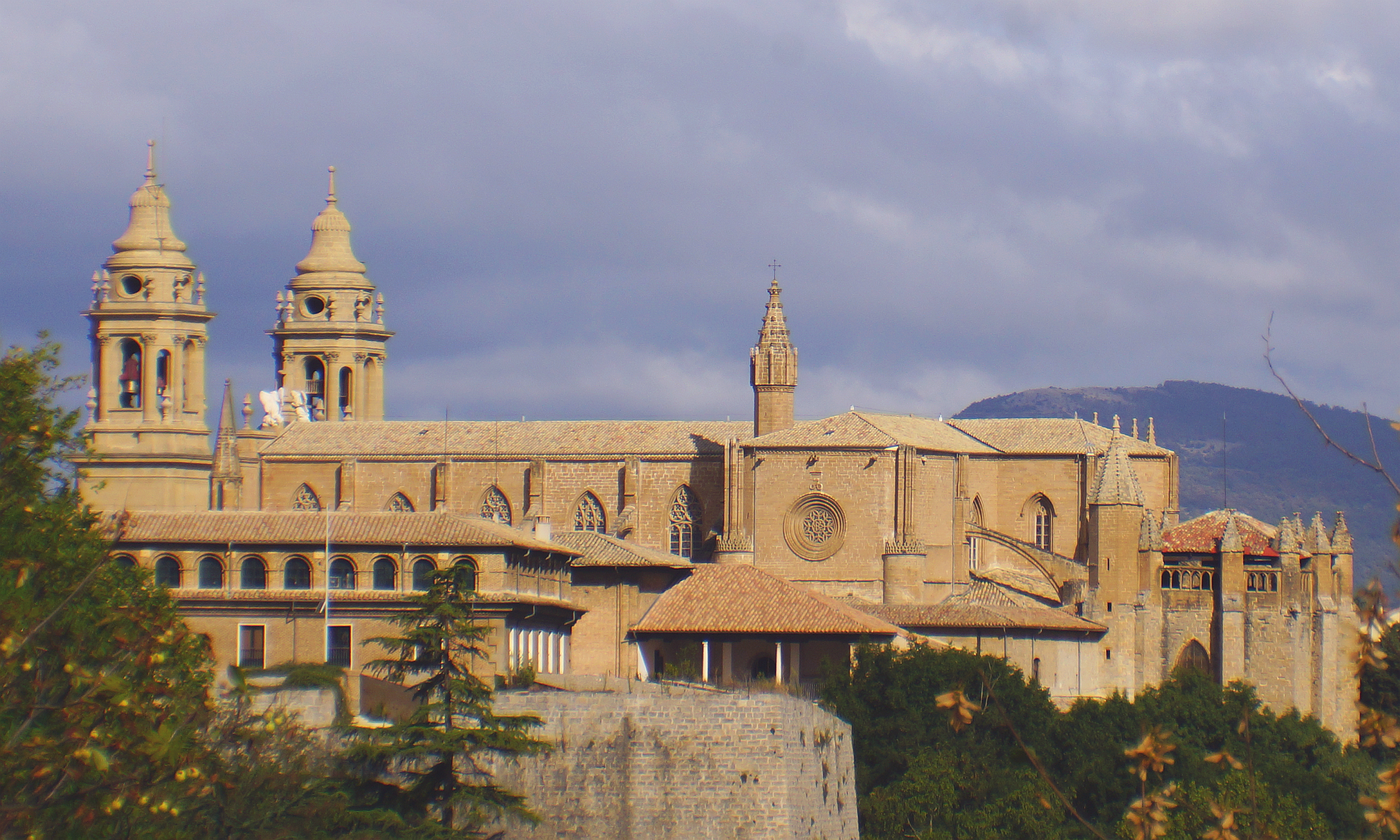
Cathedral of Pamplona (view from SSE)

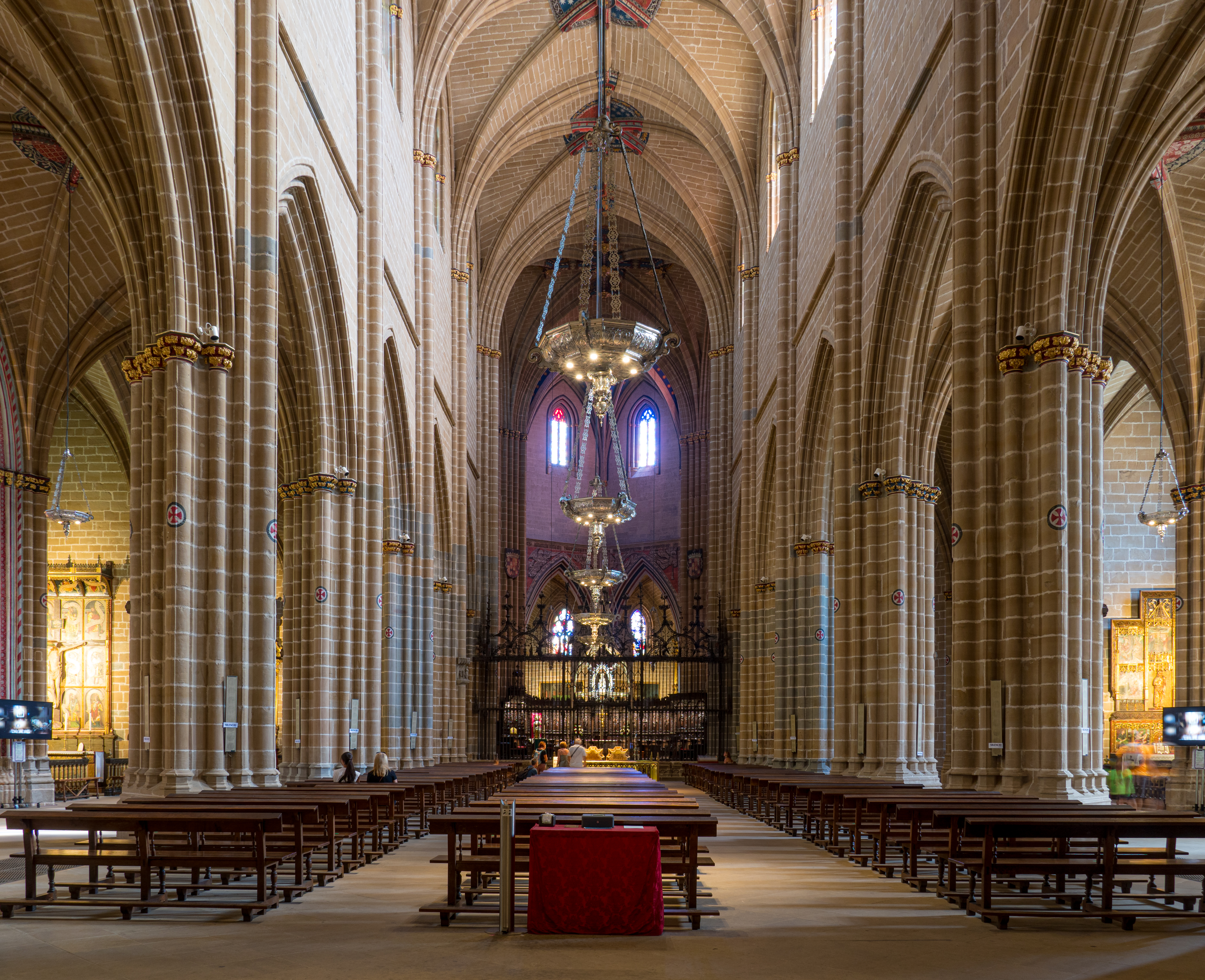
Interior of the Cathedral of Pamplona

The site of the cathedral is the oldest part of the Roman Pompaelo. Archaeological excavations in 1994 have revealed streets and buildings from the 1st century BC. The oldest cathedral was demolished in 924 during the invasion of Abd-al-Rahman III, Caliph of Cordoba. During the reign of Sancho III (1004–1035) the church was reconstructed. That church was demolished from 1083 to 1097, and the Romanesque cathedral was built from 1100 to 1127. It collapsed in 1391, with only the façade remaining. The building of the current Gothic church began in 1394 and lasted to 1501. The floorplan is cruciform with ambulatory, a central nave and four shorter aisles, all covered by partially polycromed rib vault. The style is very influenced by French models.

The sculpture of the interior includes the tomb of Charles III of Navarre and Eleanor of Castile, by Jehan Lome de Tournai (1419), and the image of Royal Saint Mary, a Romanesque woodcarved silverplated sculpture. The choir, with its Renaissance choir stalls (1541), is separated from the nave by a Gothic iron grating (1517). There was a Renaissance retable (1598) in the presbytery, now in the church of Saint Michael in Pamplona. In the lateral chapels there are two Gothic retables (c. 1500, 1507); one Italian Renaissance retable (16th century); one late Renaissance retable (1610, polycromed in 1617); and five Baroque retables (1642, 1683, 1685).

== Cloister ==
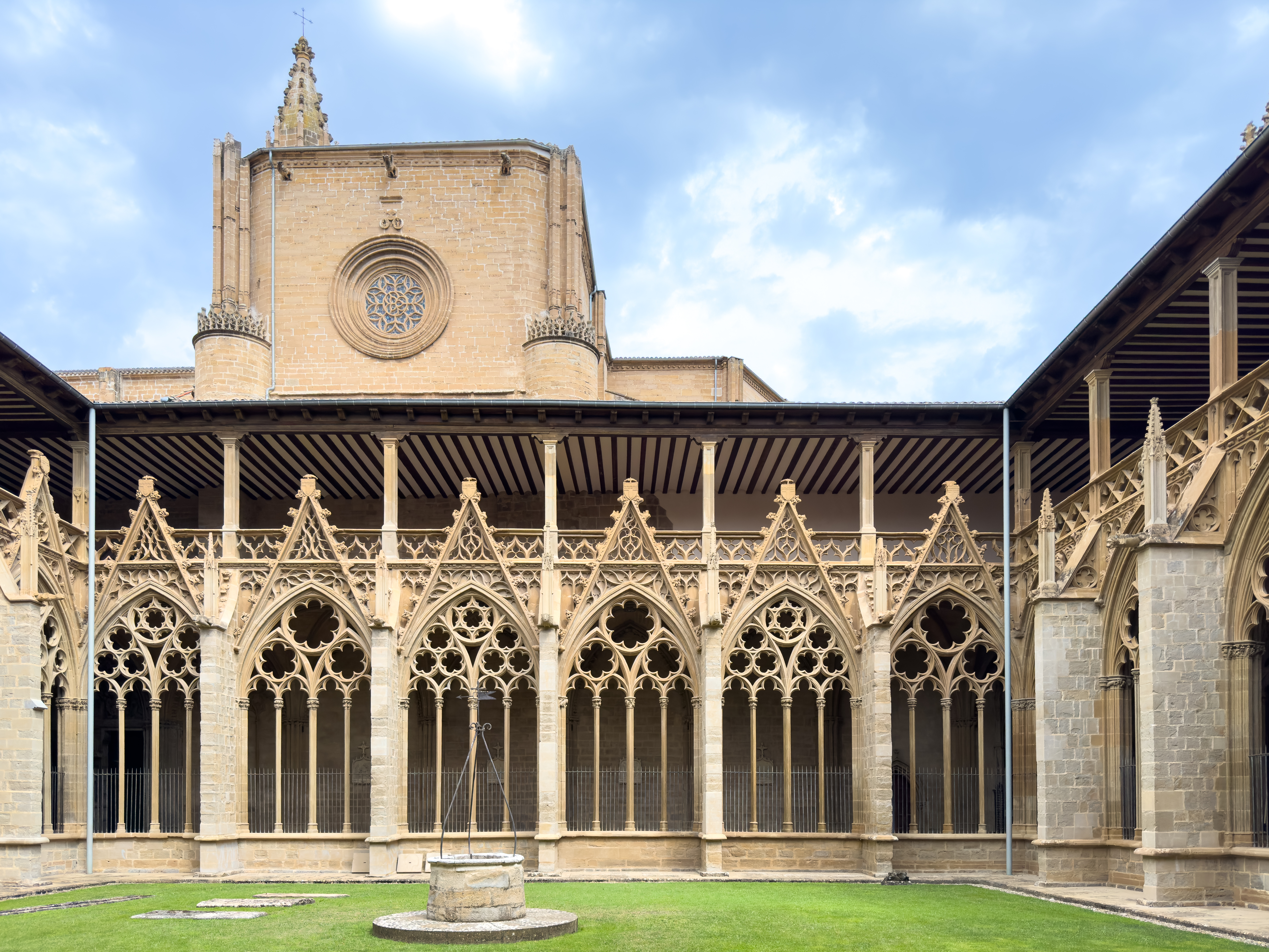
Cloister of the Cathedral of Pamplona

Probably, the most outstanding element of the cathedral is its 13th century cloister. As the temple, the style followed the French Gothic architecture, and the sculptural decoration is very rich. The door that gives access from the temple shows the Dormition of the Virgin, and at the mullion stands a 15th-century sculpture of the Virgin Mary. The Barbazan chapel—named after the Pamplonese bishop buried there, Arnaldo de Barbazán—is covered by a Gothic eight-rib vault. The so-called 'Precious Door' gives access to the ancient canons' dormitory and shows a complete sculptural story of the Virgin Mary's life. There are several notable burials: Bishop Miguel Sánchez de Asiáin's (14th century), Viceroy of Navarre Count of Gages' (Baroque, 18th century) and guerrilla fighter Francisco Espoz y Mina's (Neo-classical, 19th century). The lavatory is closed by a grid whose iron is said to be from the battle of Navas de Tolosa. Another decorated Gothic door gives access to the old kitchen and the refectory.

== Diocesan Museum ==
The former canons' rooms house the Diocesan Museum. The main room is a 14th-century rib-vault covered refectory. The adjacent kitchen is covered by a pyramidal stone-built chimney. This museum exhibits pieces of religious art from the cathedral and from many other Navarrese churches, many of them abandoned today: Romanesque, Gothic, Renaissance and Baroque sculpture, Gothic and Baroque painting, and 13th to 18th centuries goldsmith and silversmith.

The most outstanding silversmith pieces are the Gothic Holy Sepulcher reliquary, made in 13th century Paris; the 14th century Lignum Crucis reliquary and the Renaissance 16th century processional monstrance.

== Gallery ==
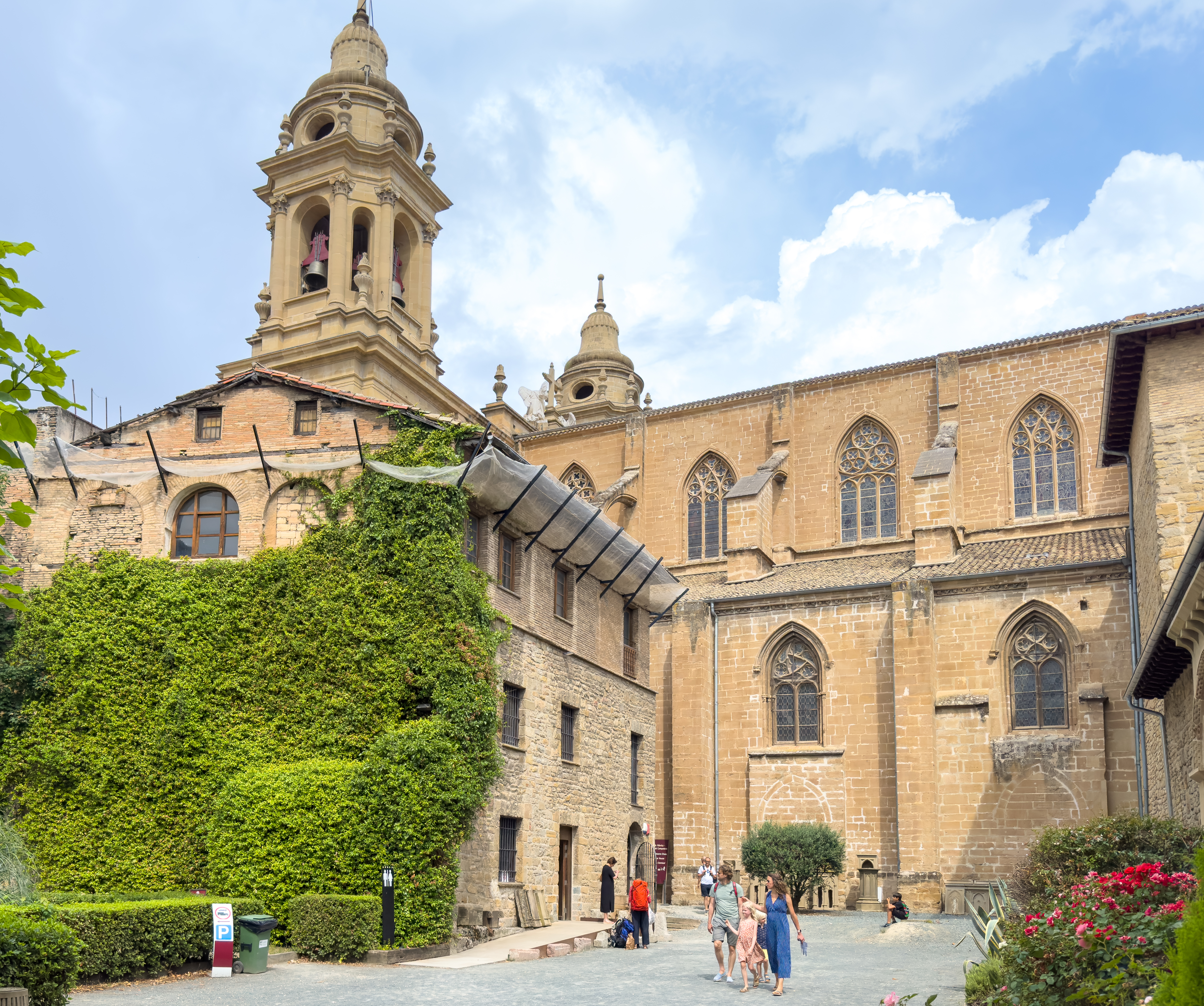

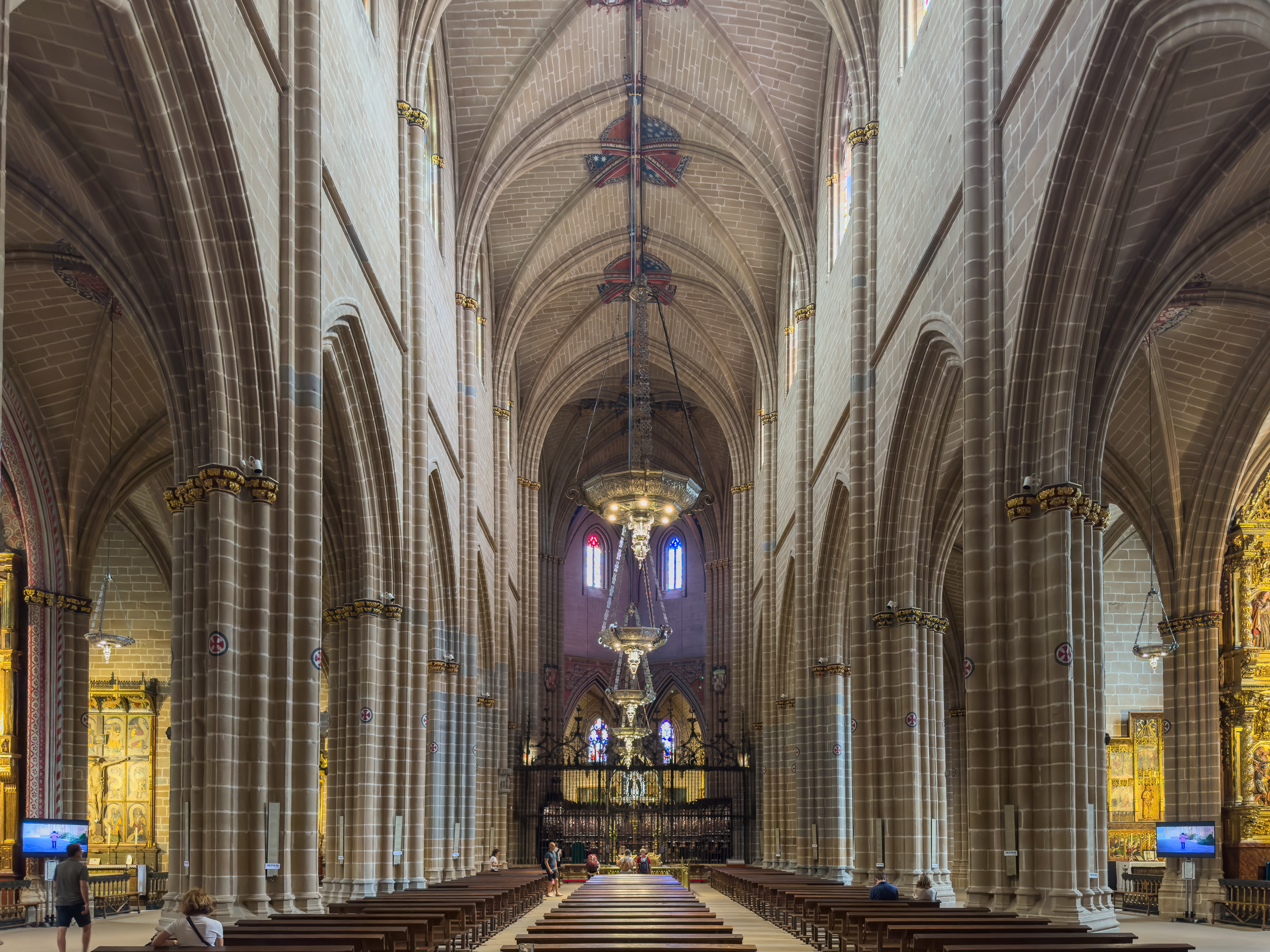

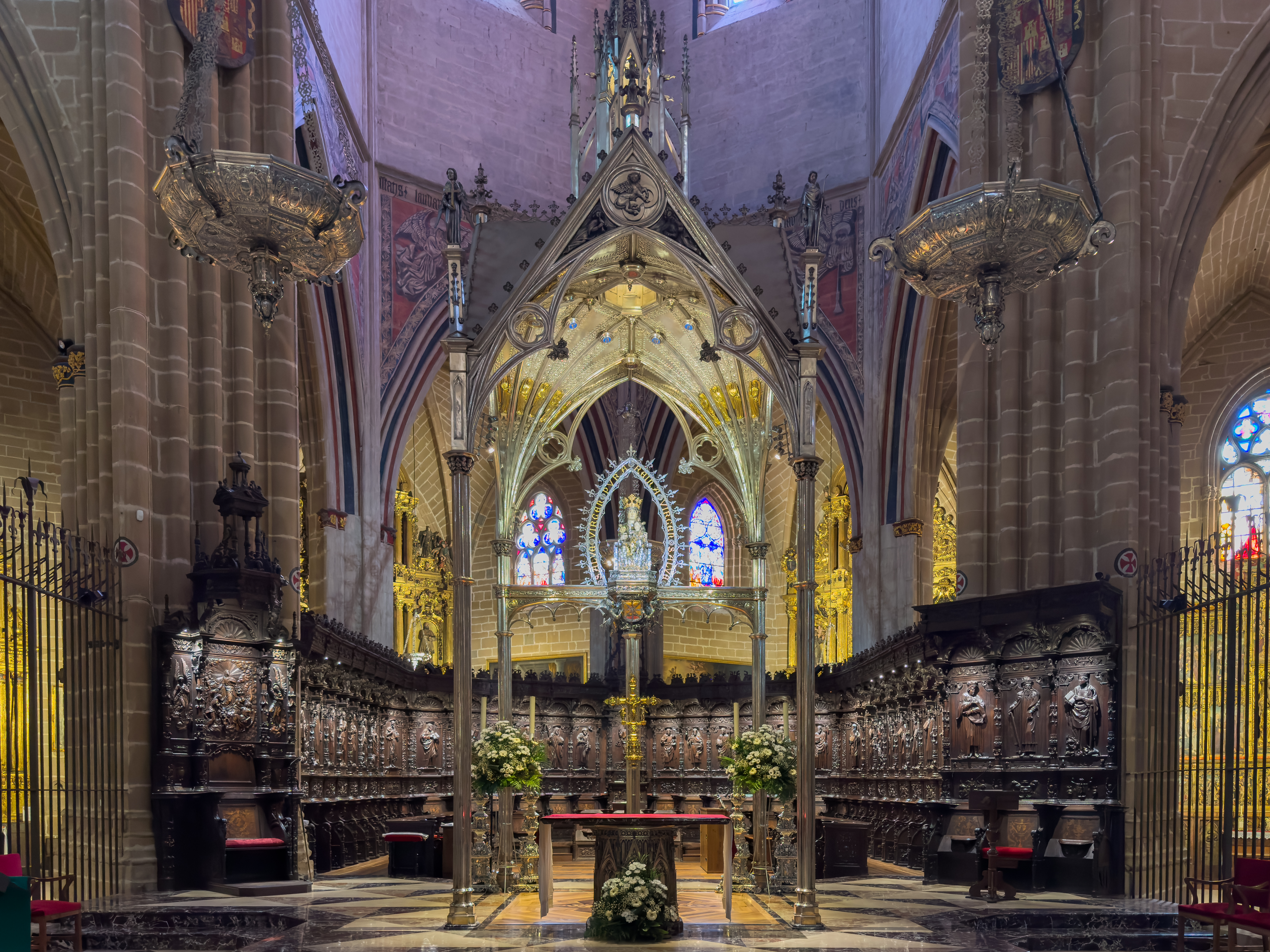

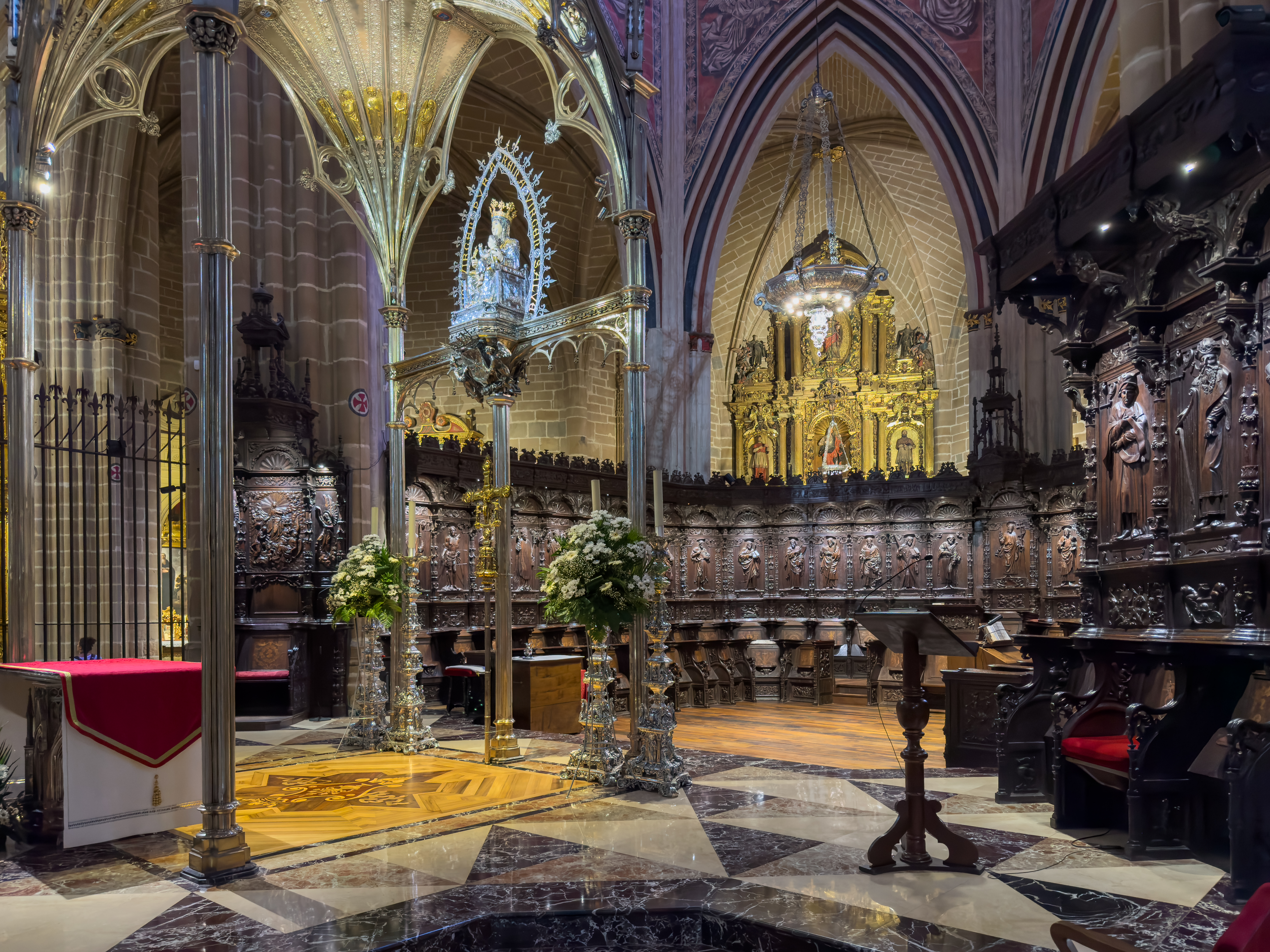

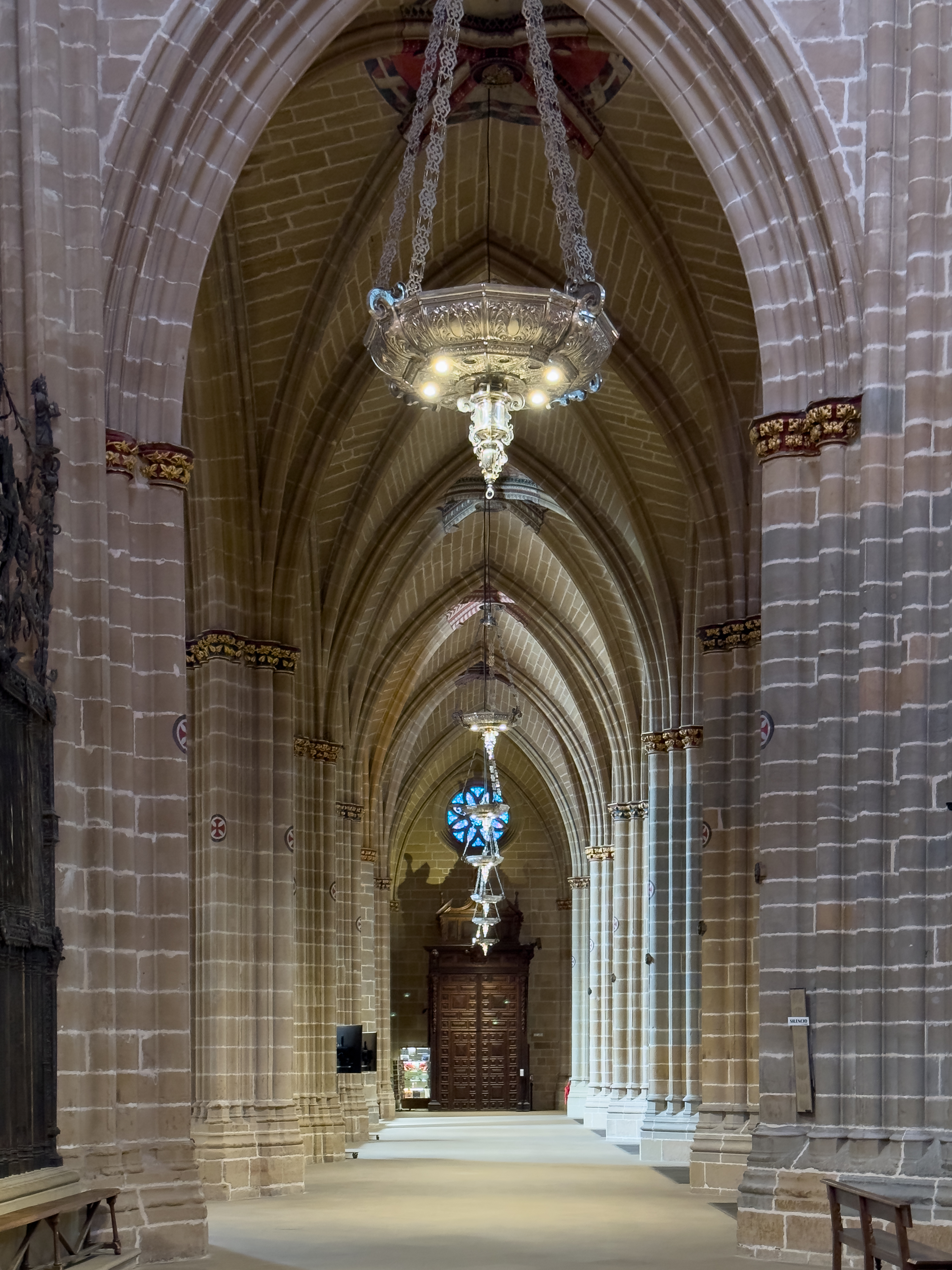

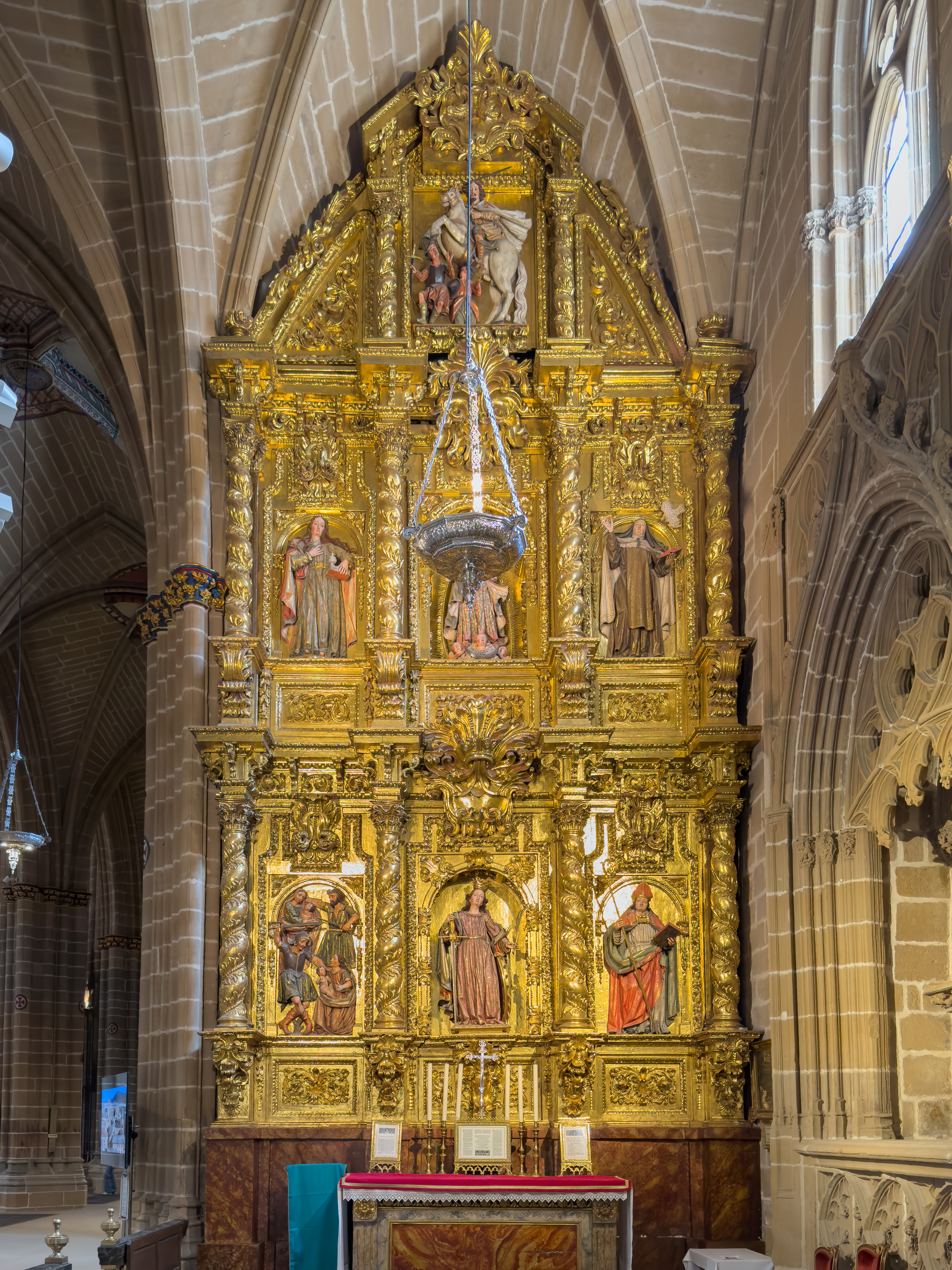

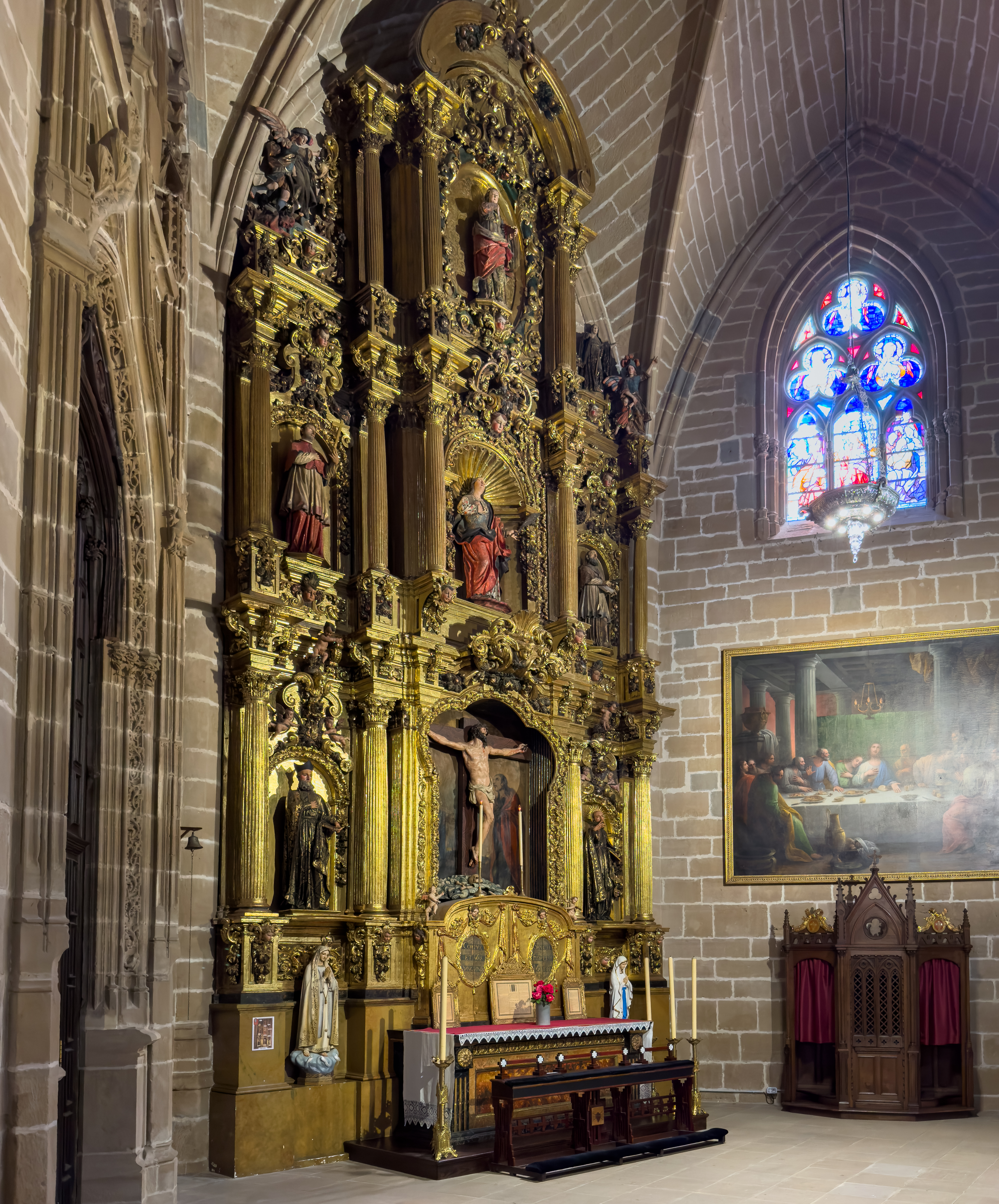

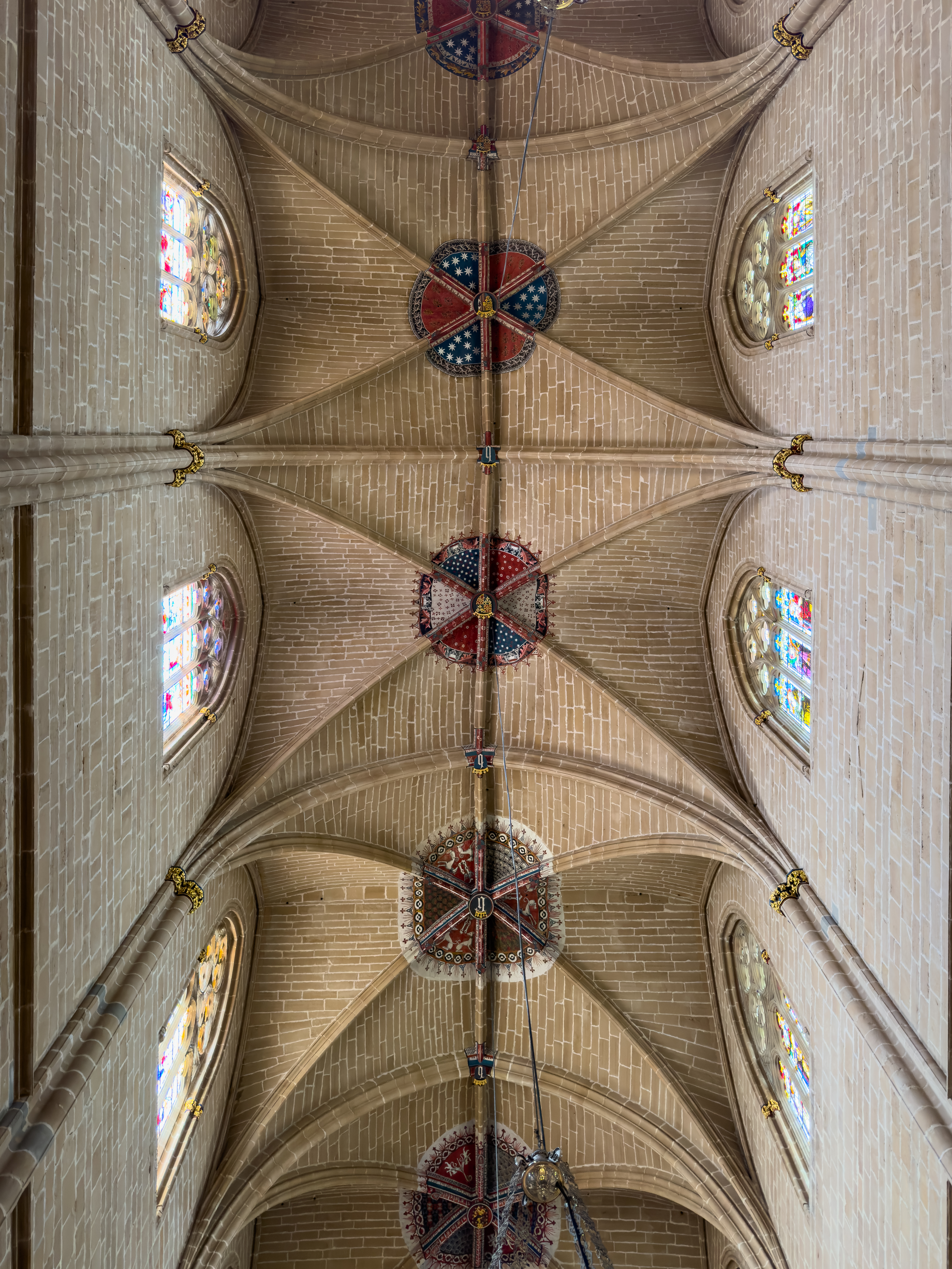

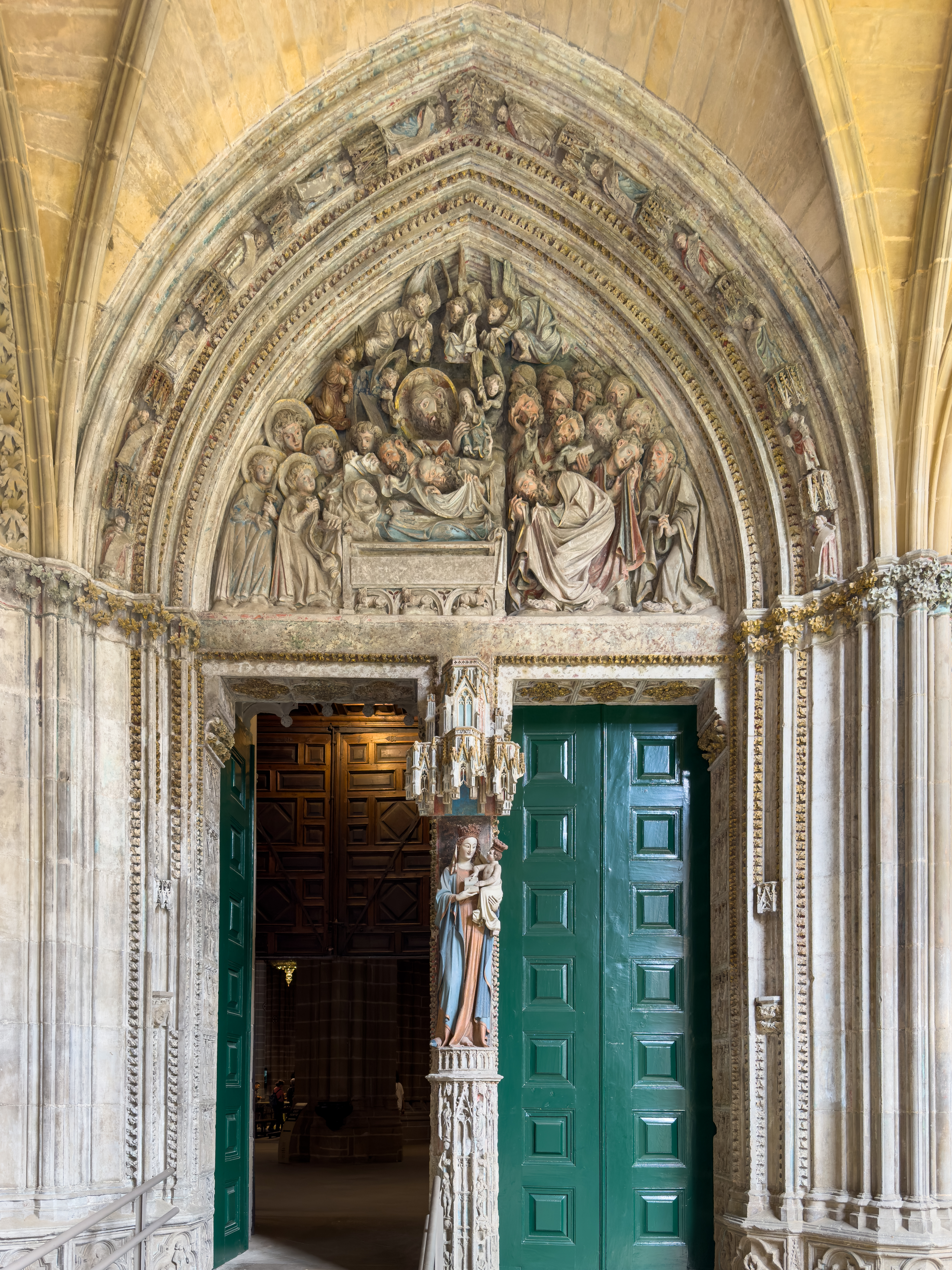

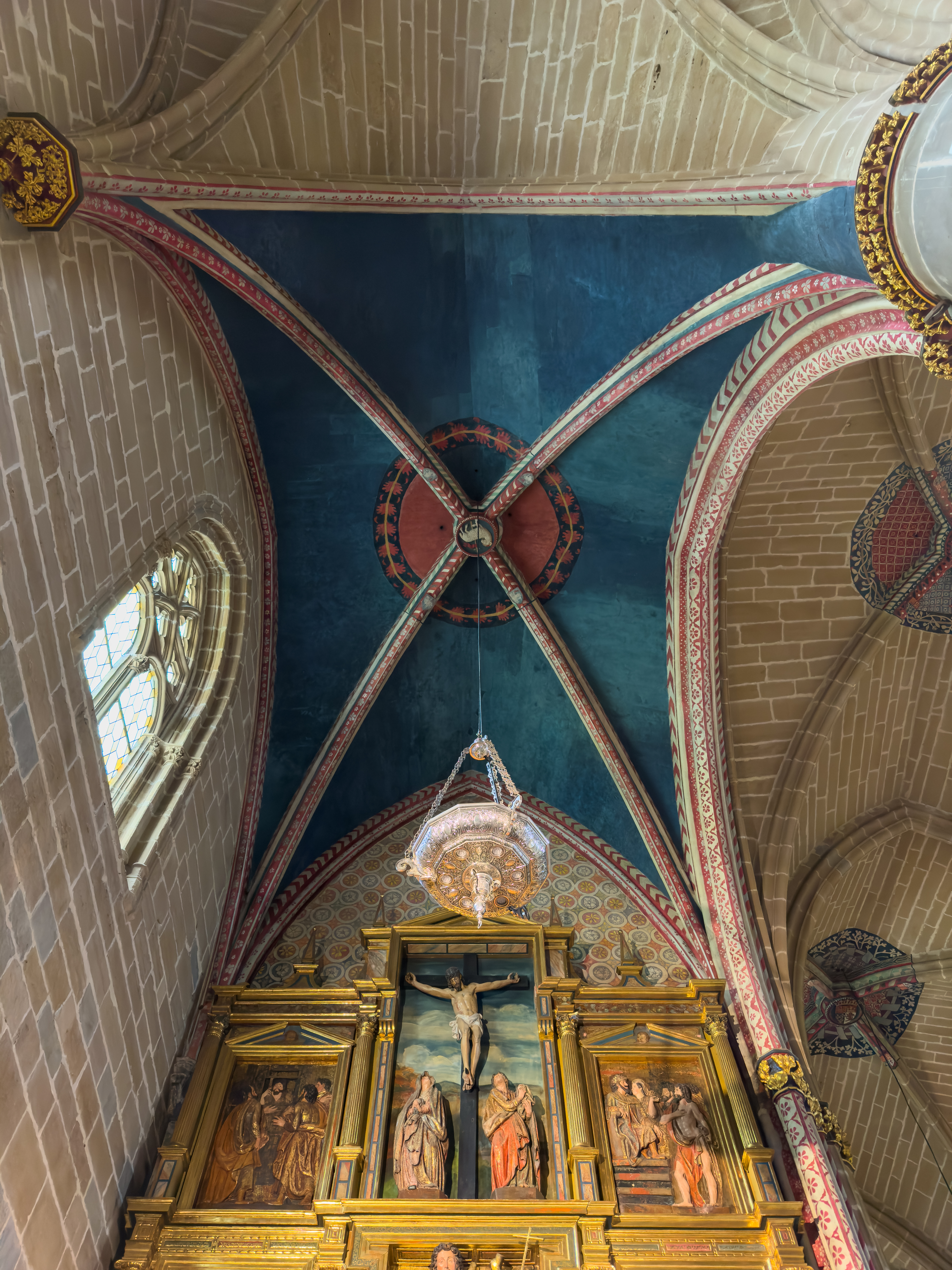

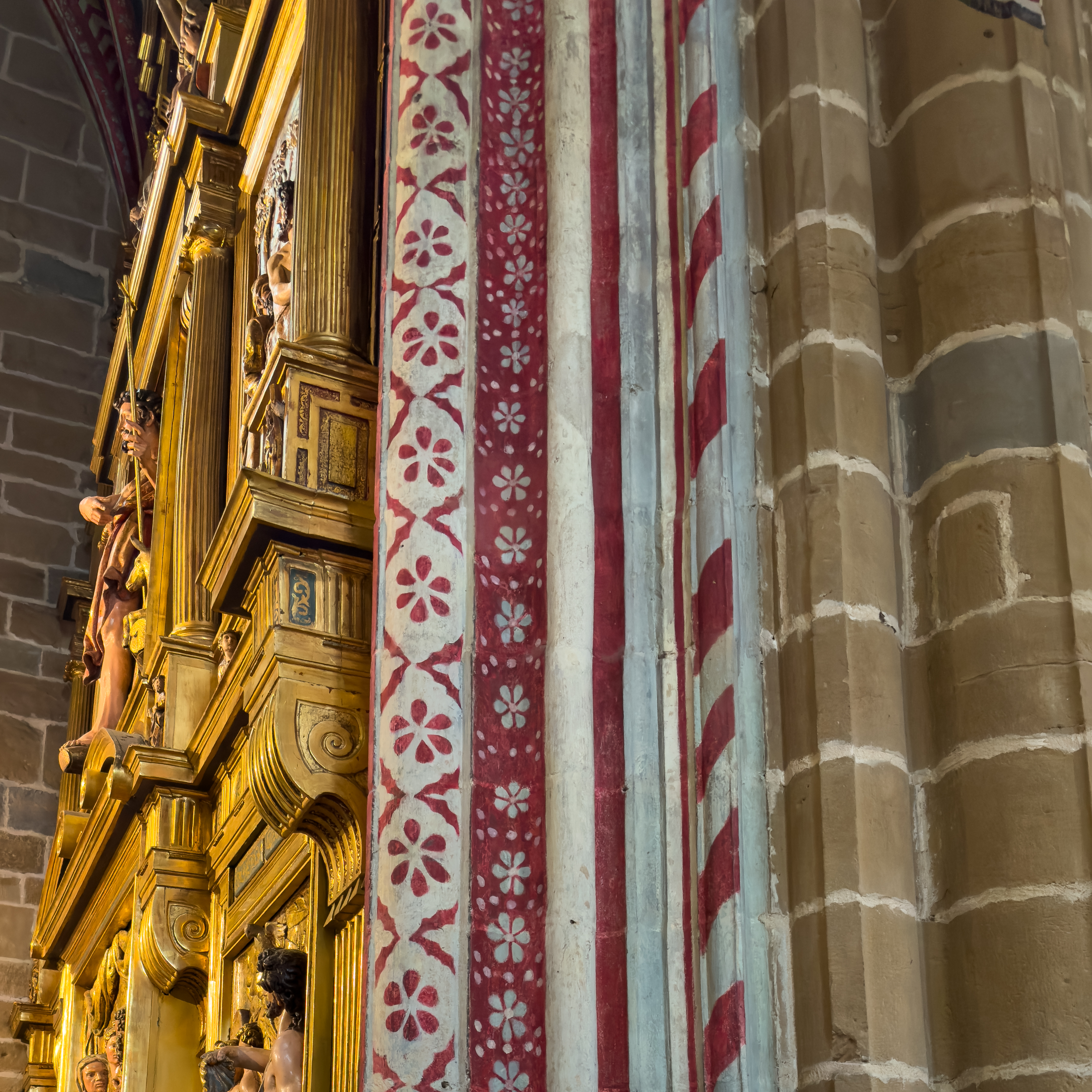

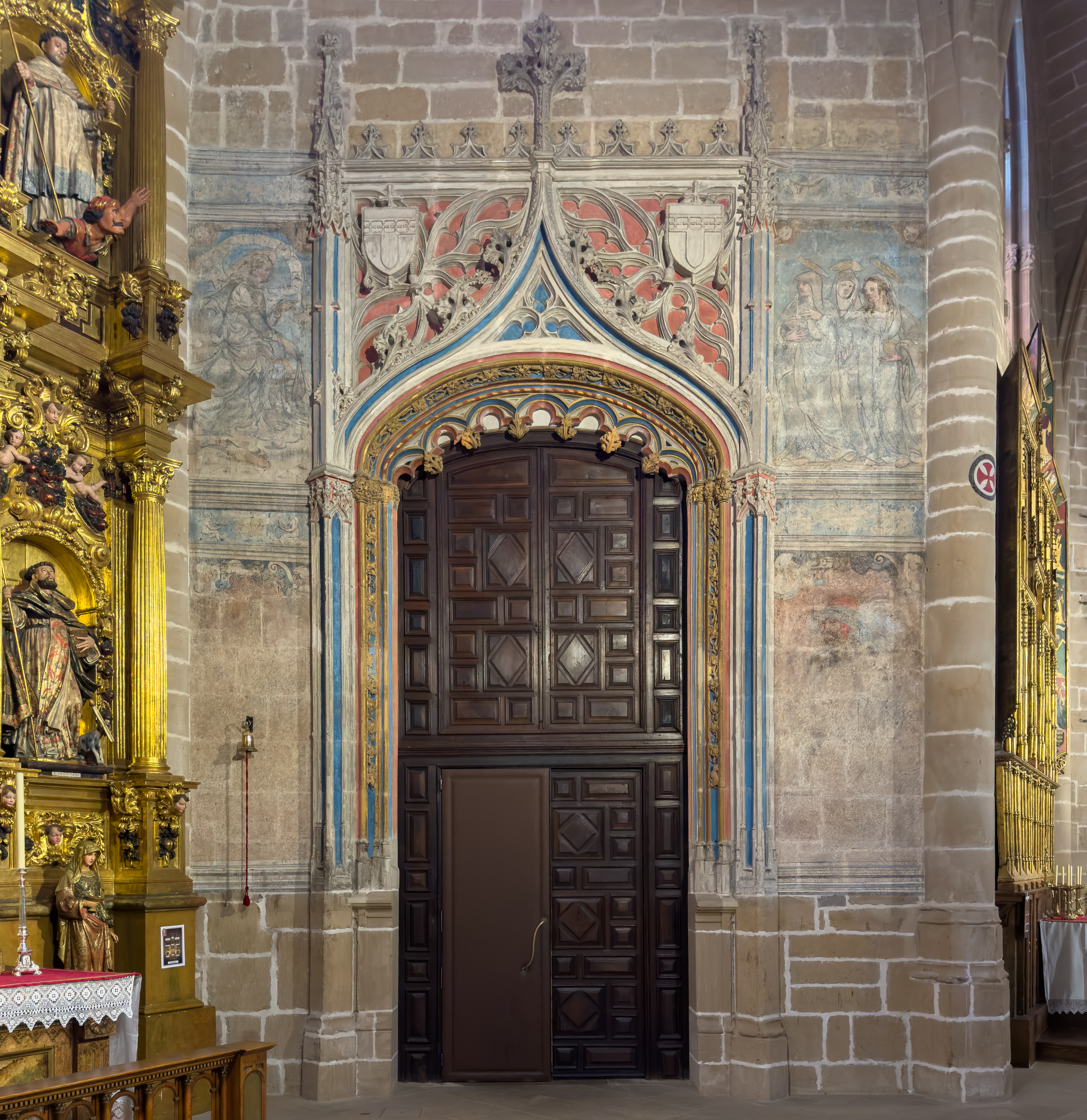

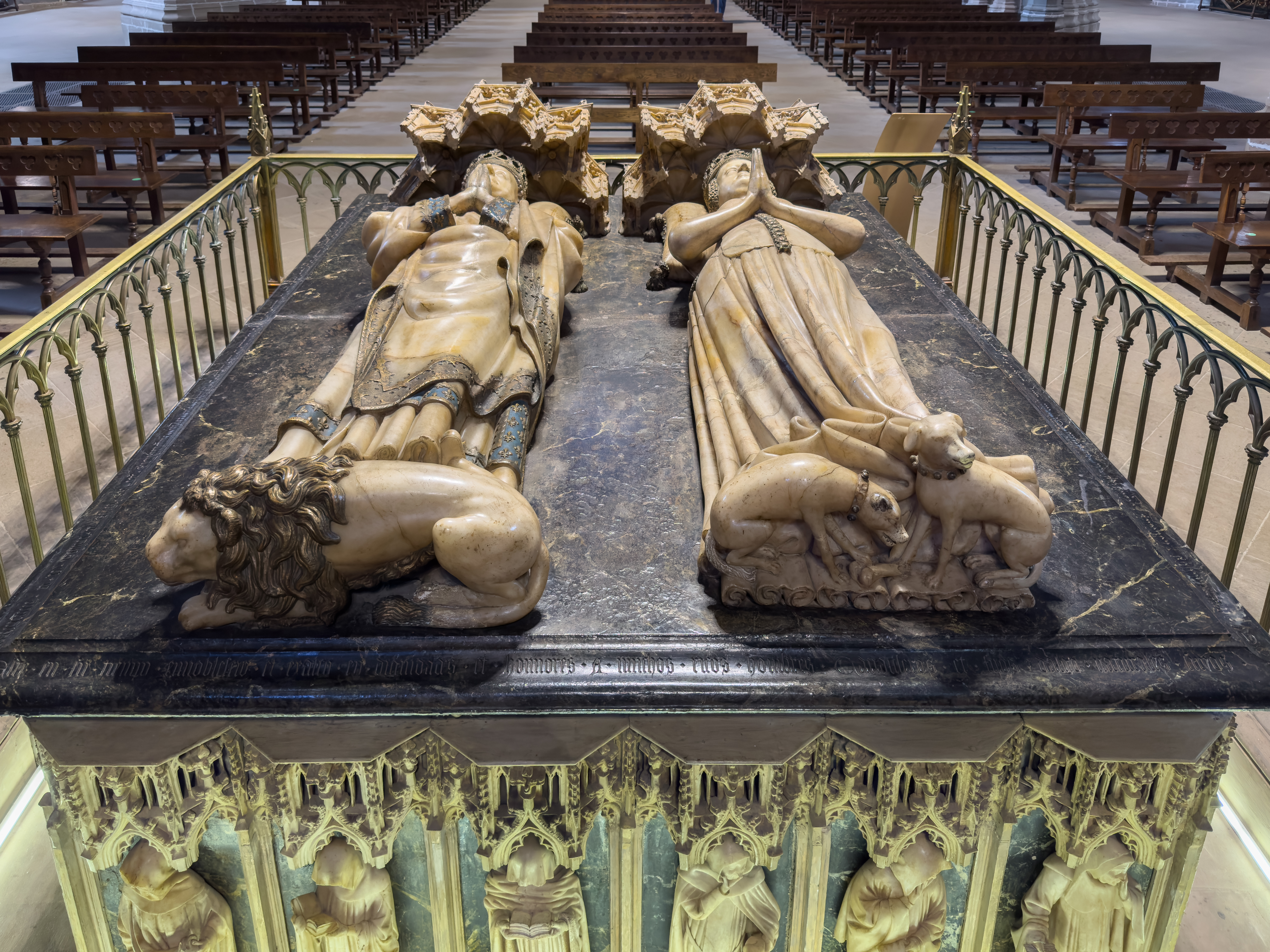

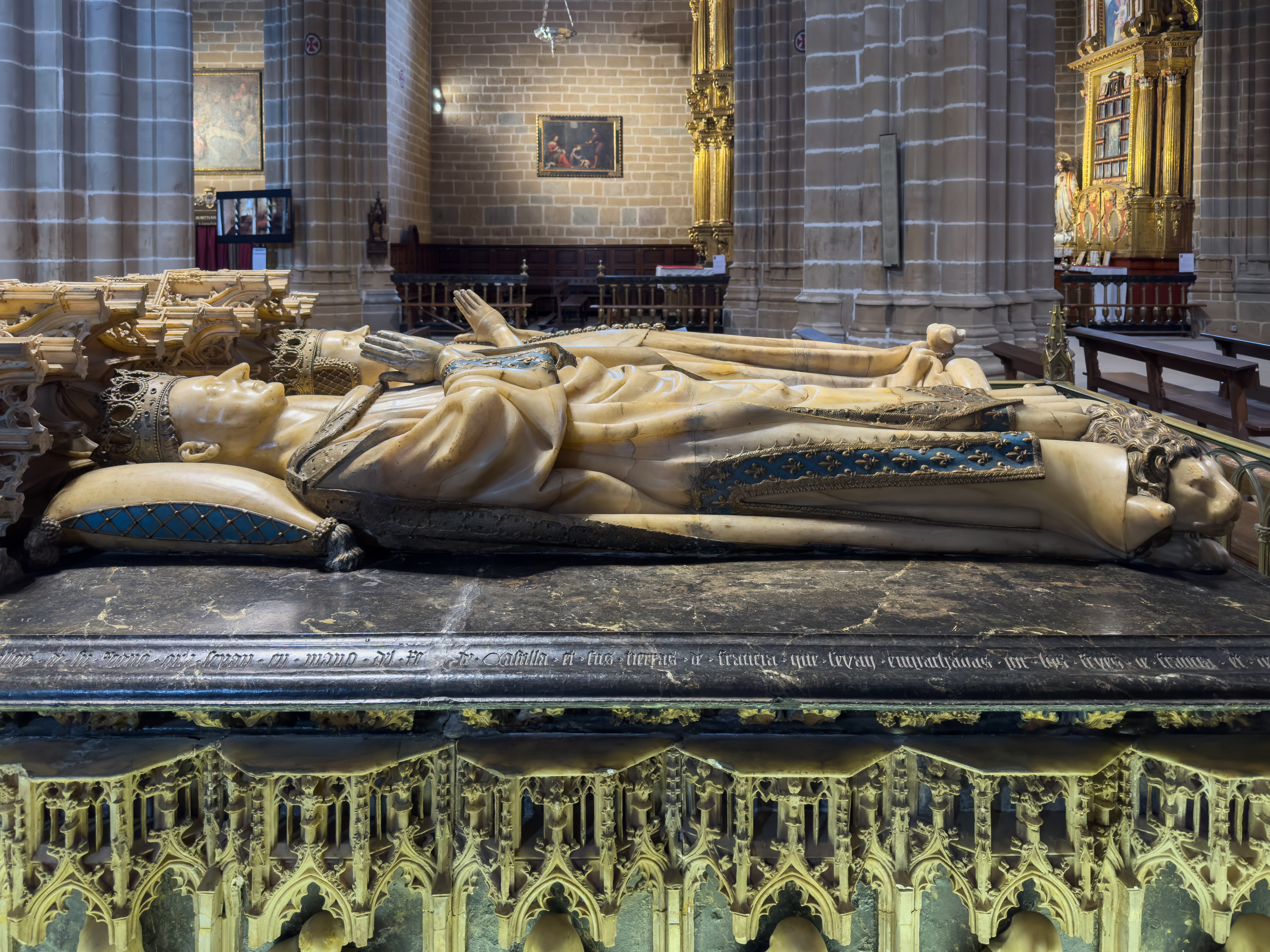

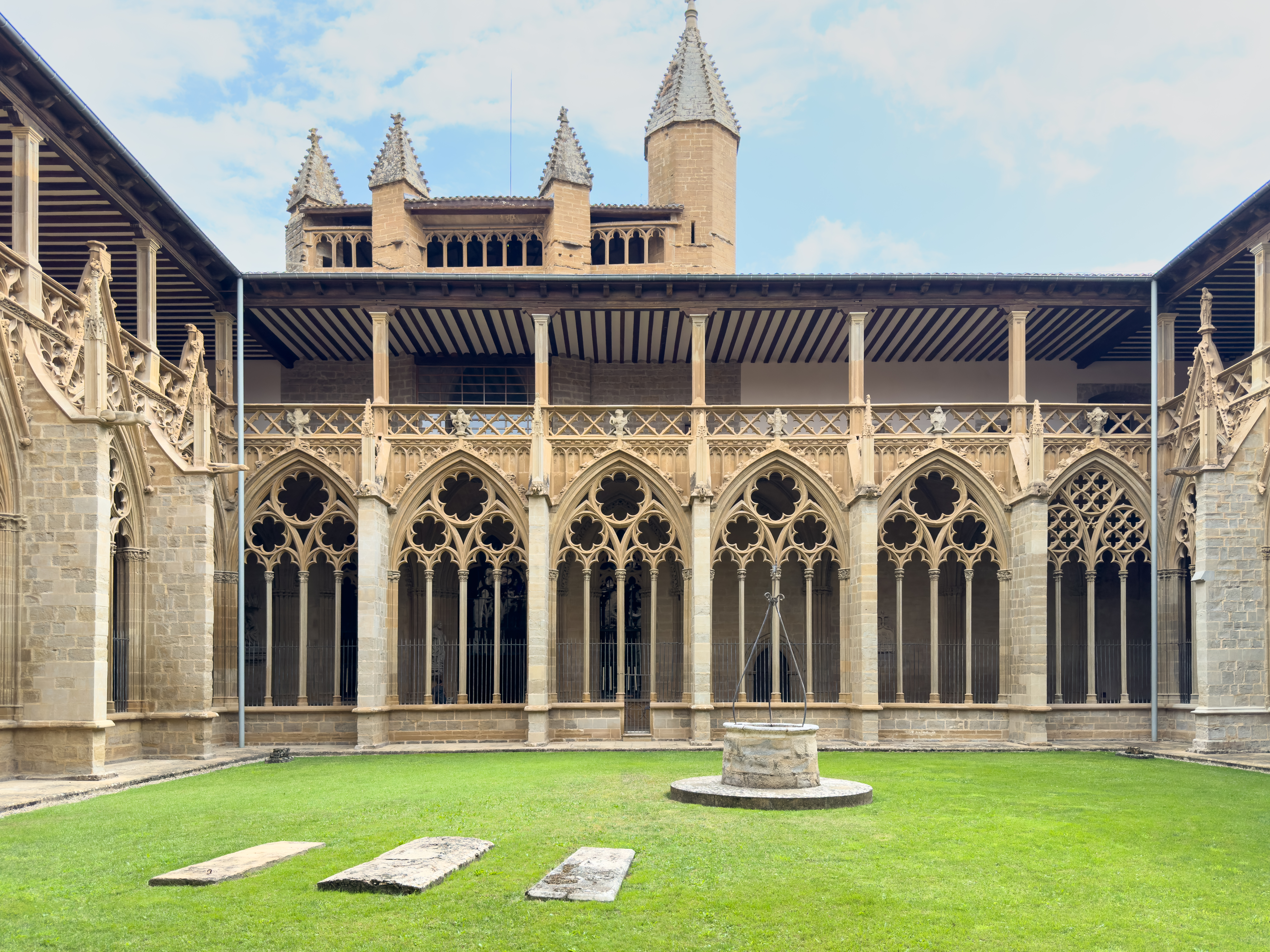

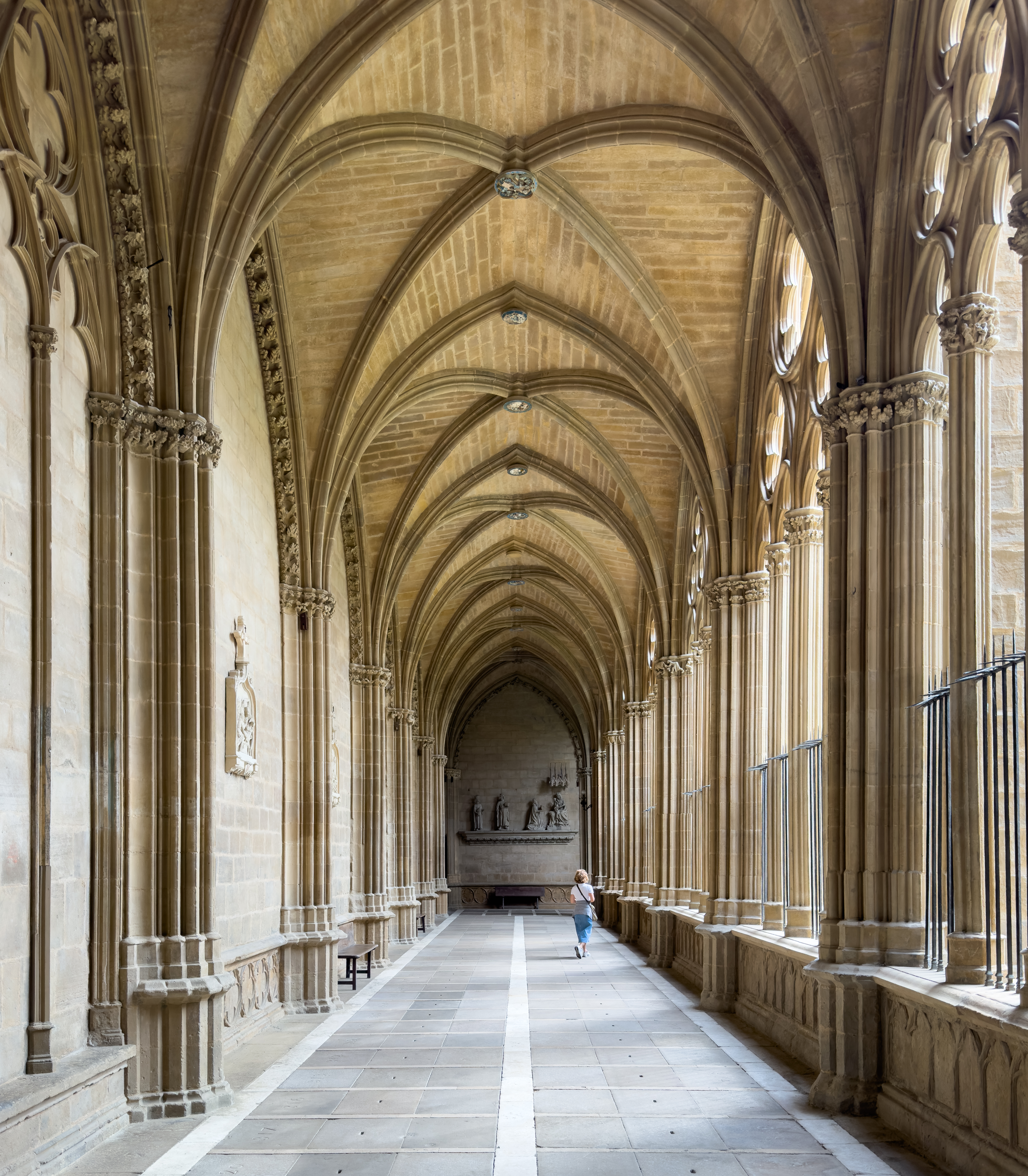

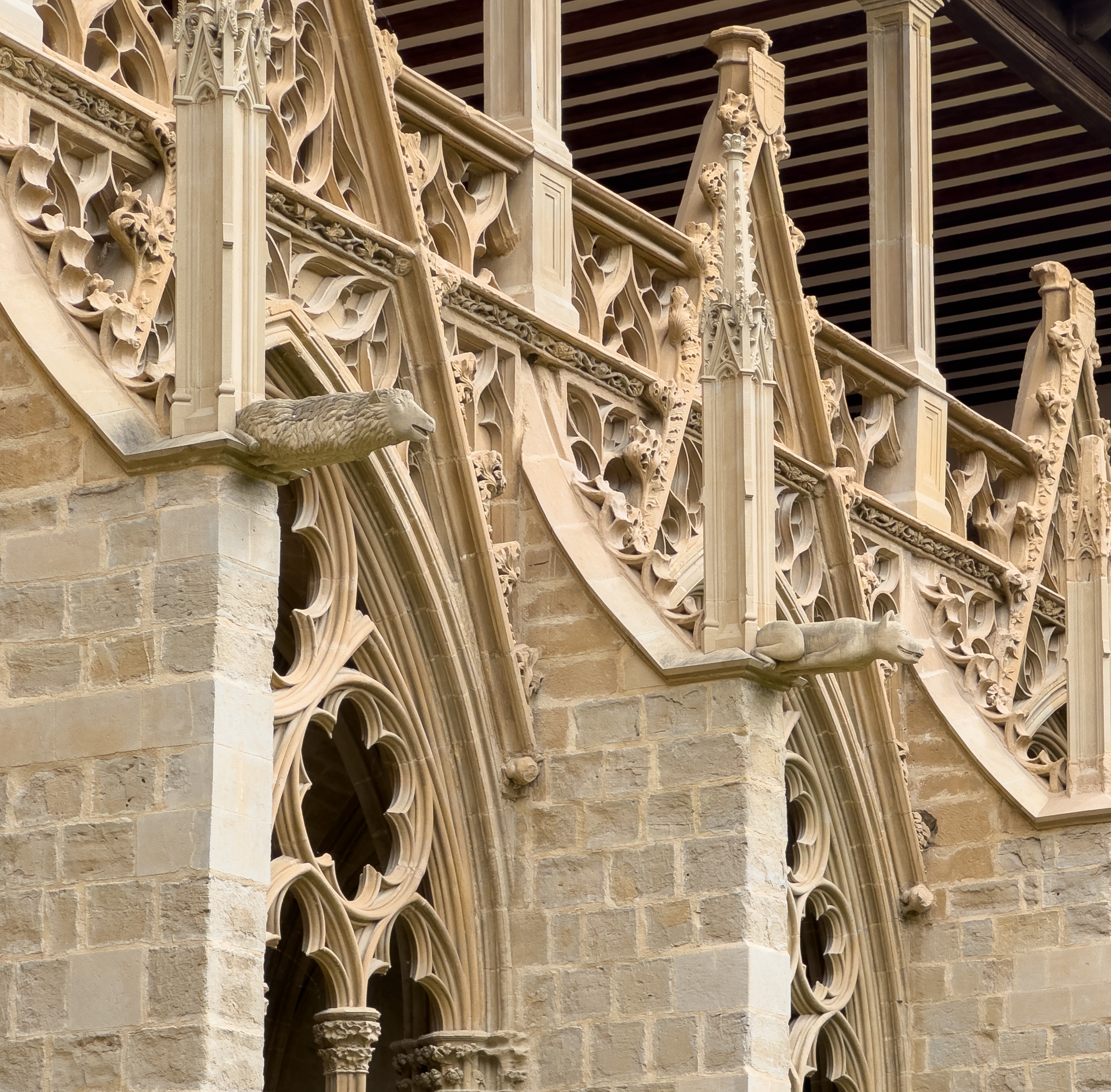

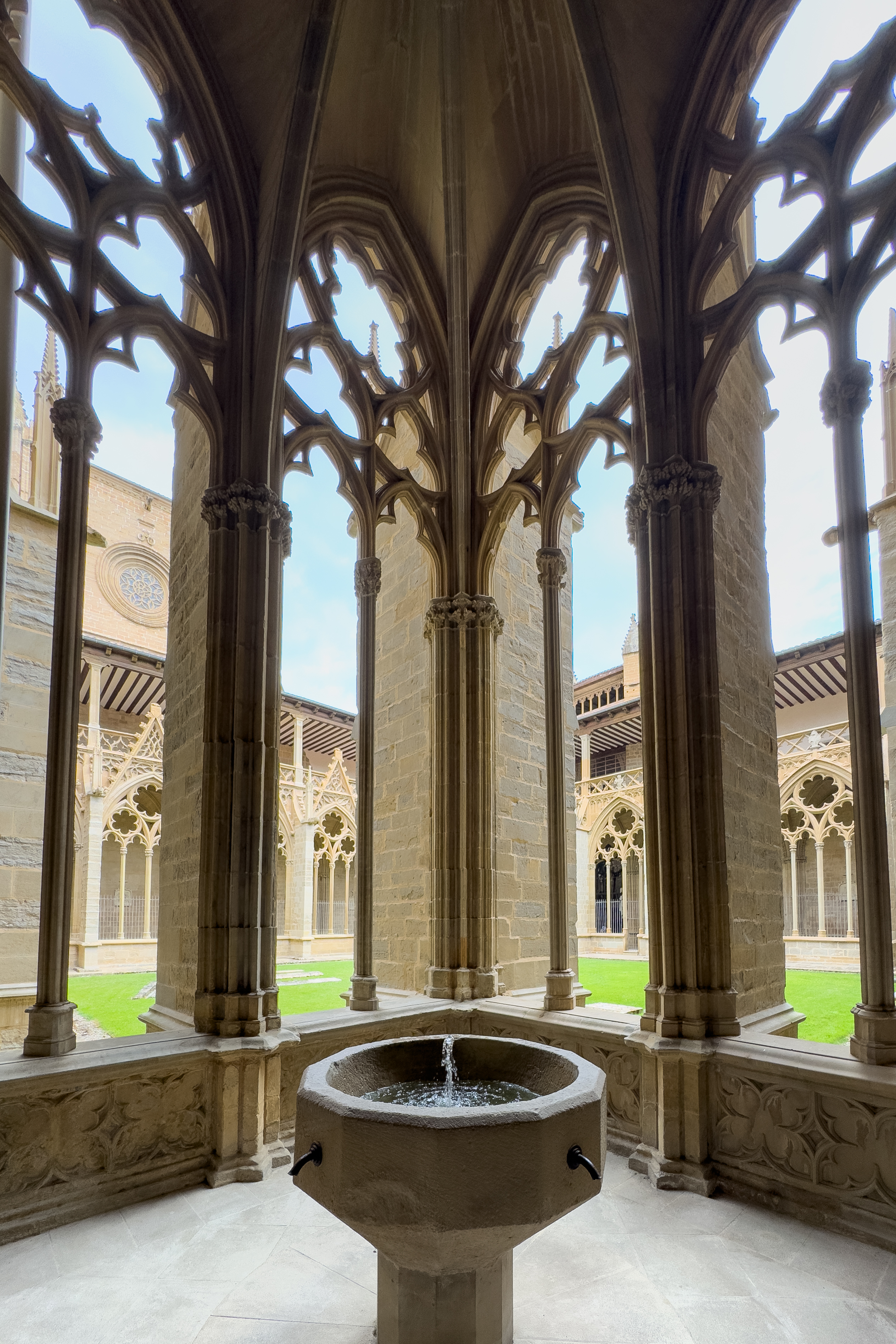

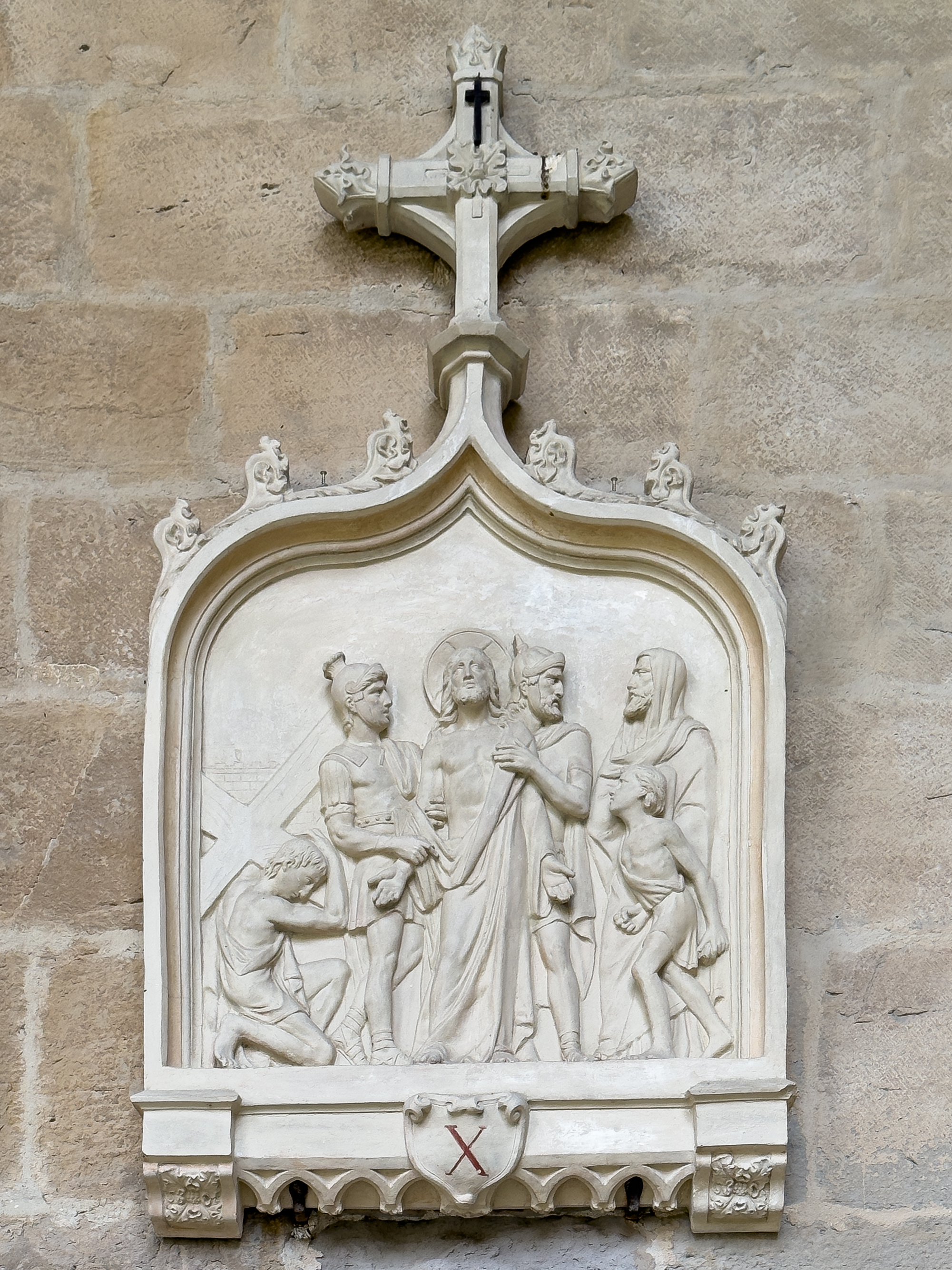

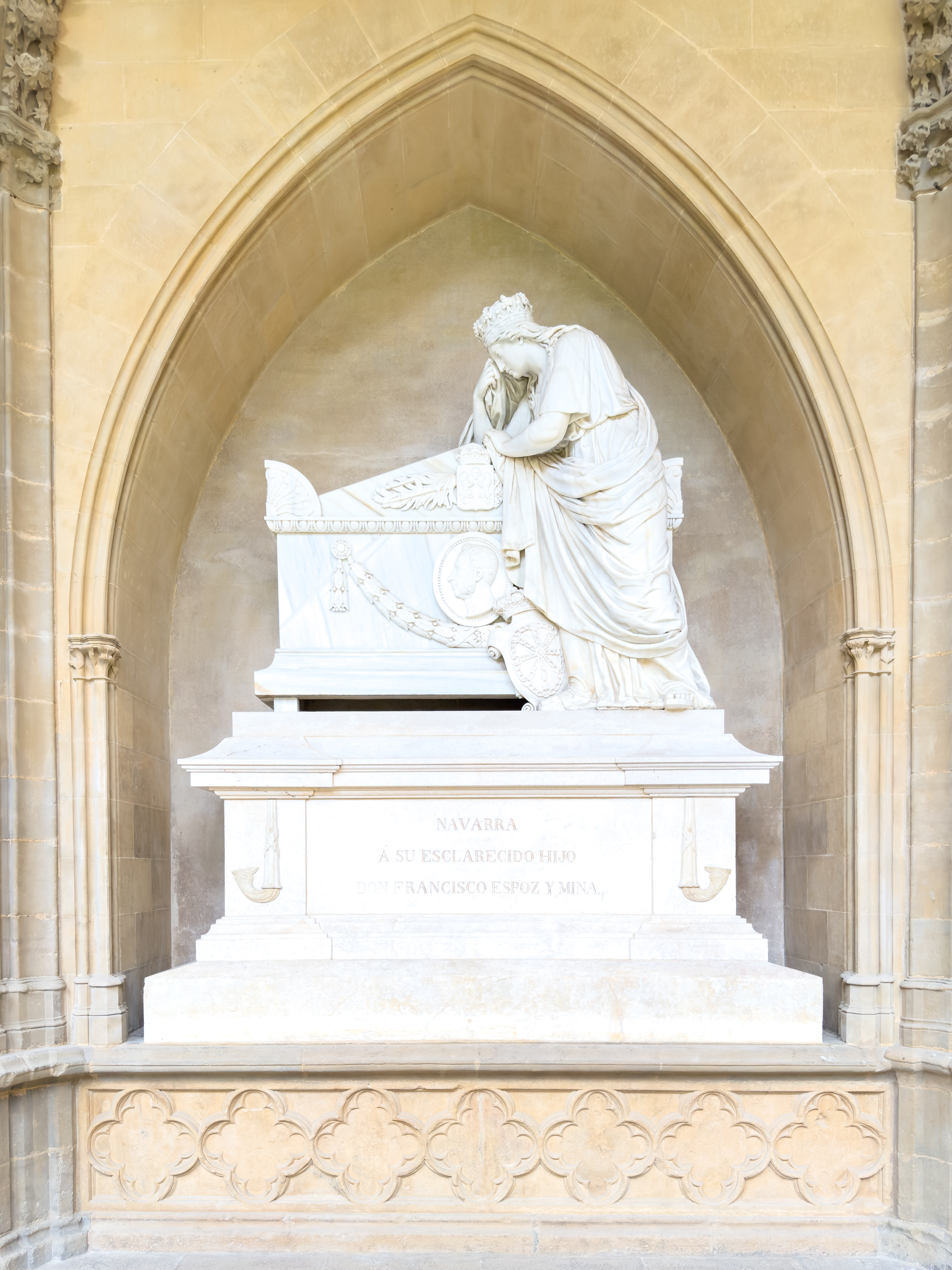

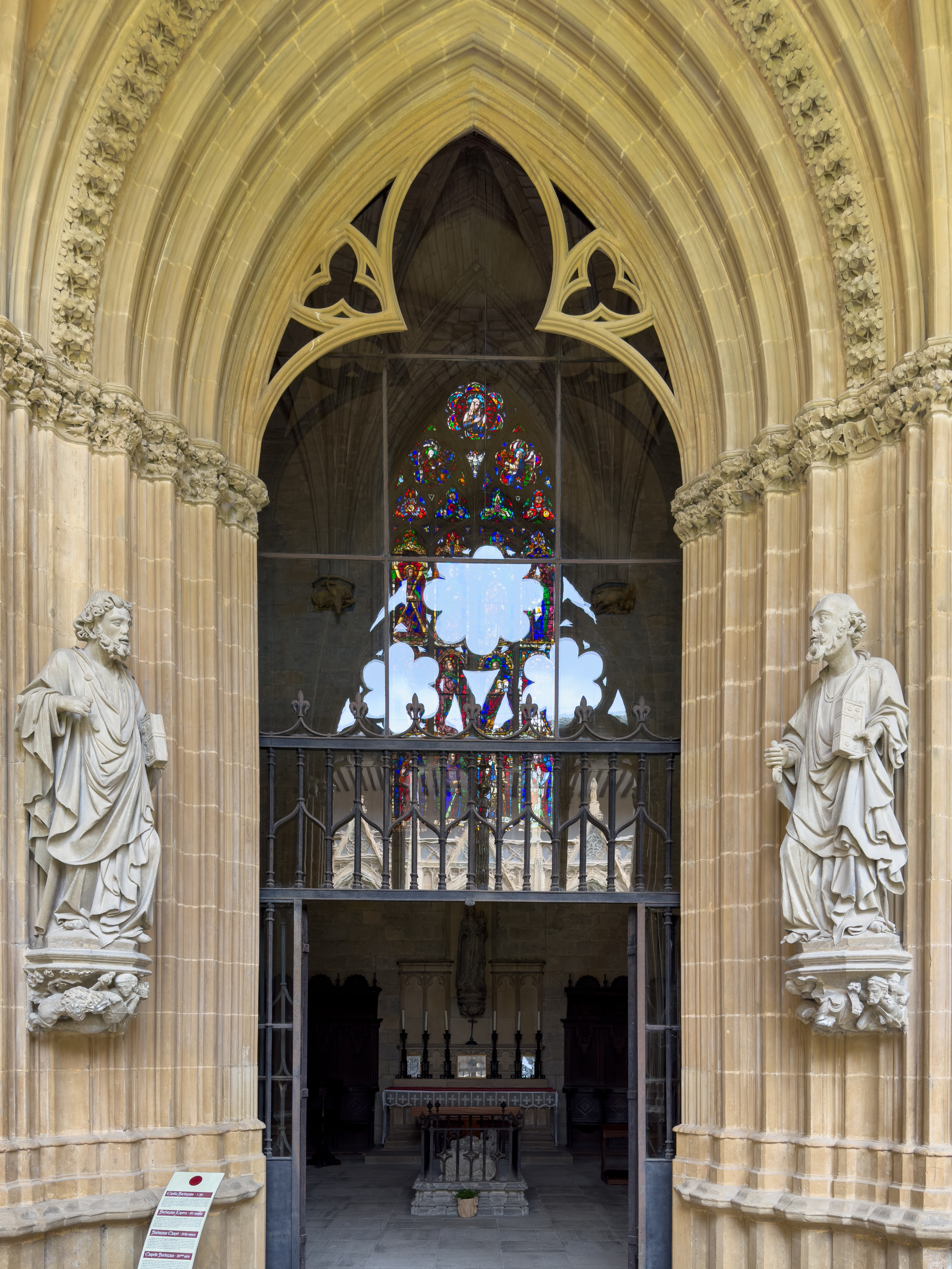

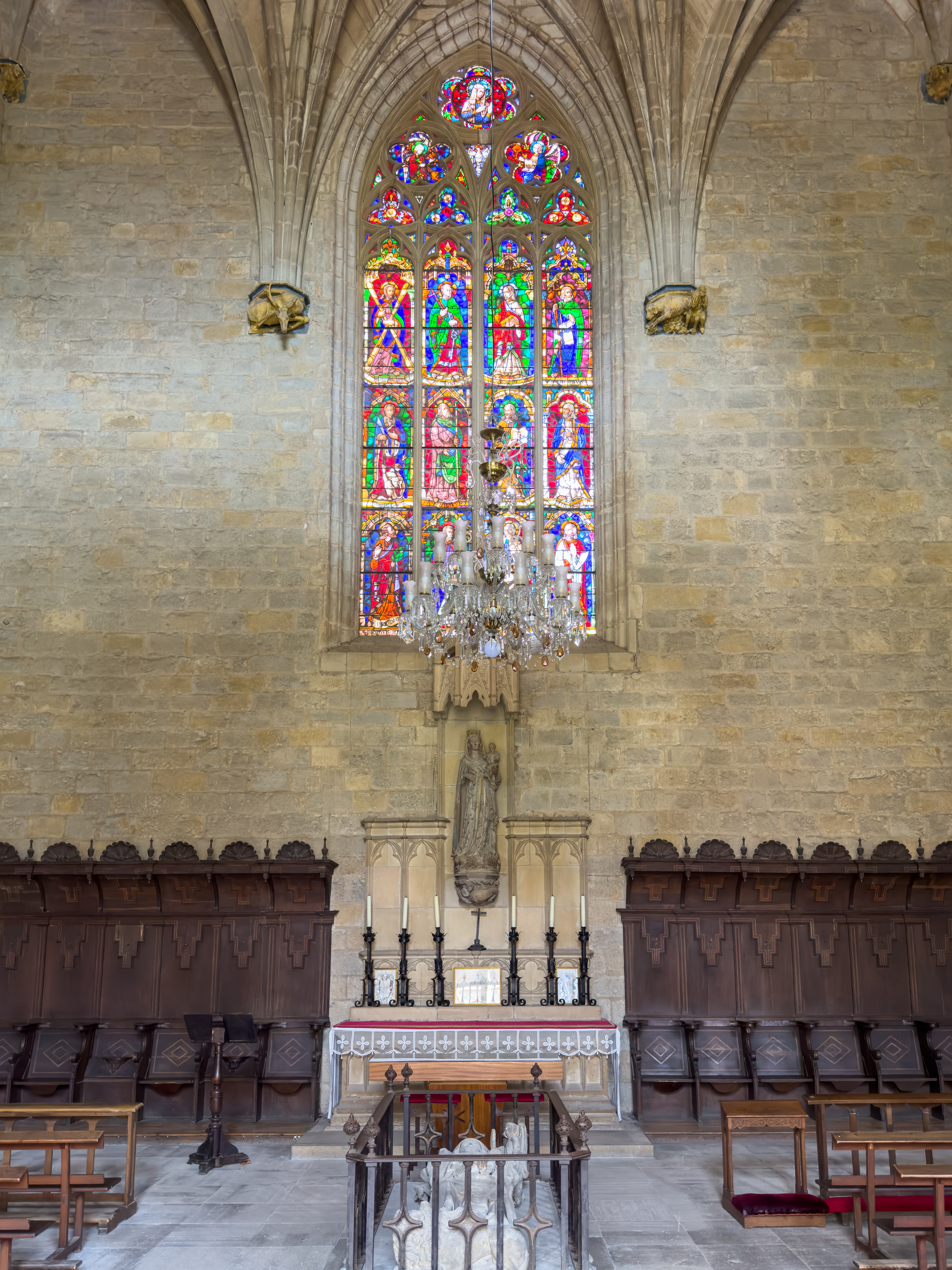

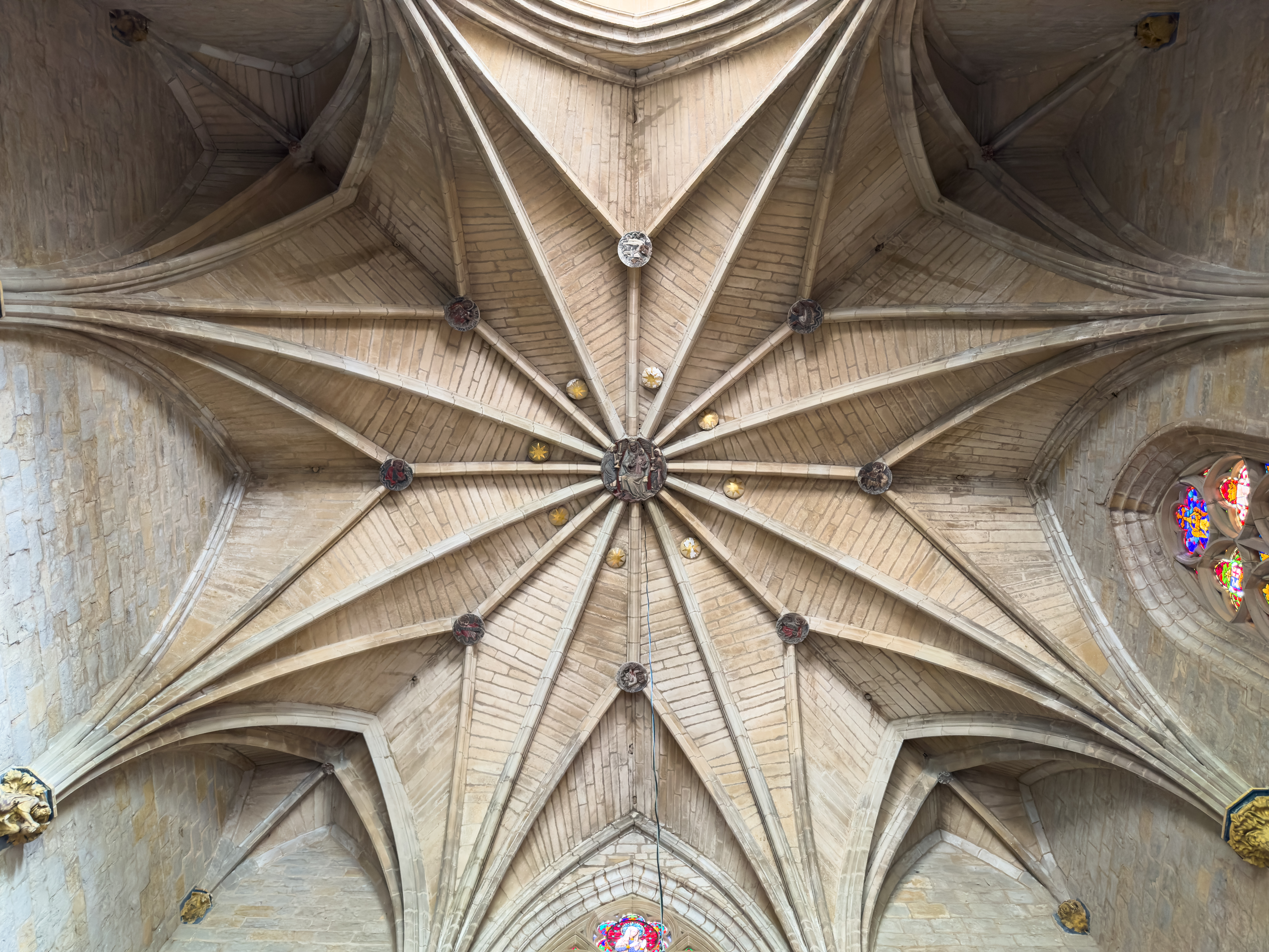

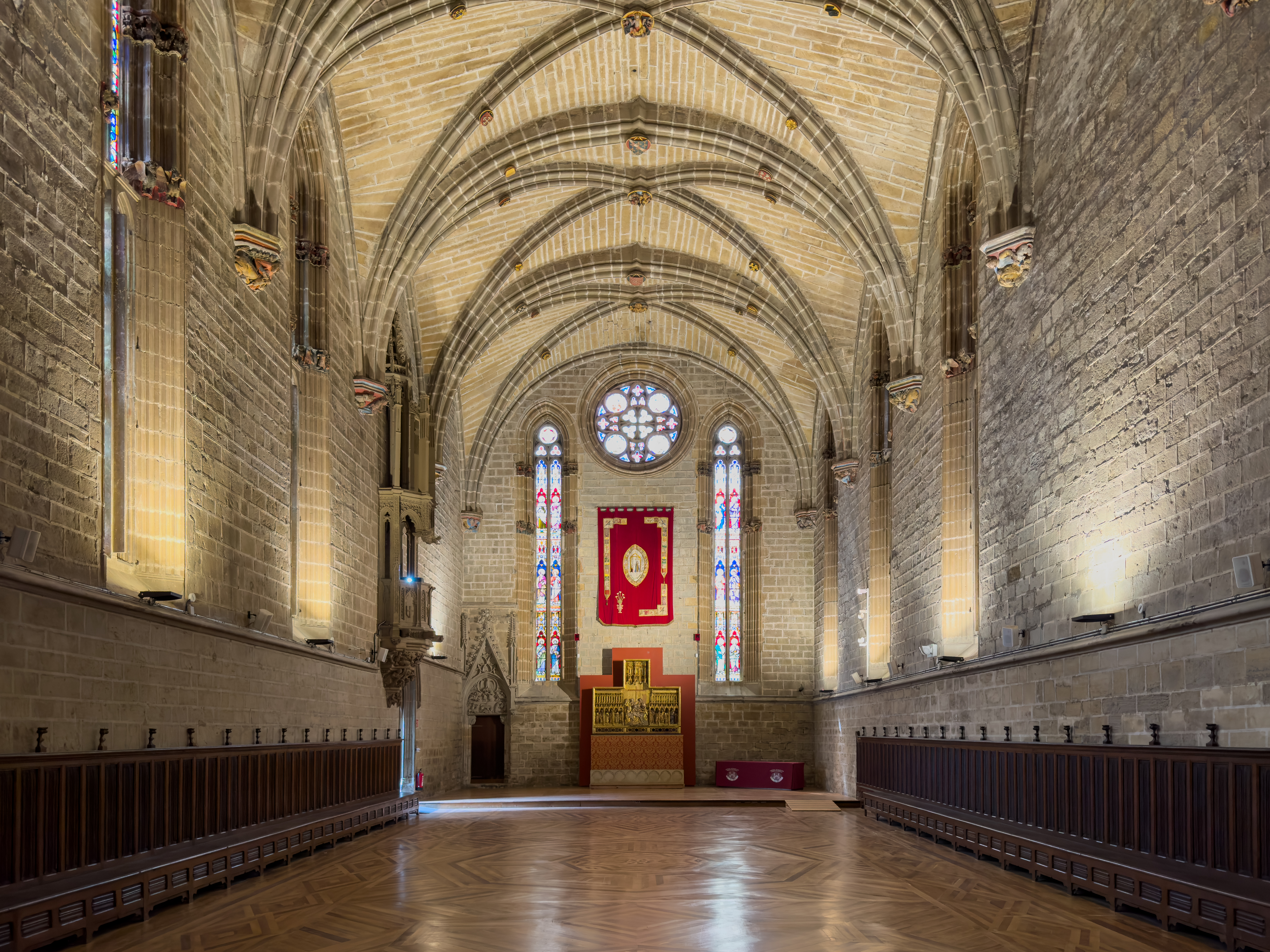

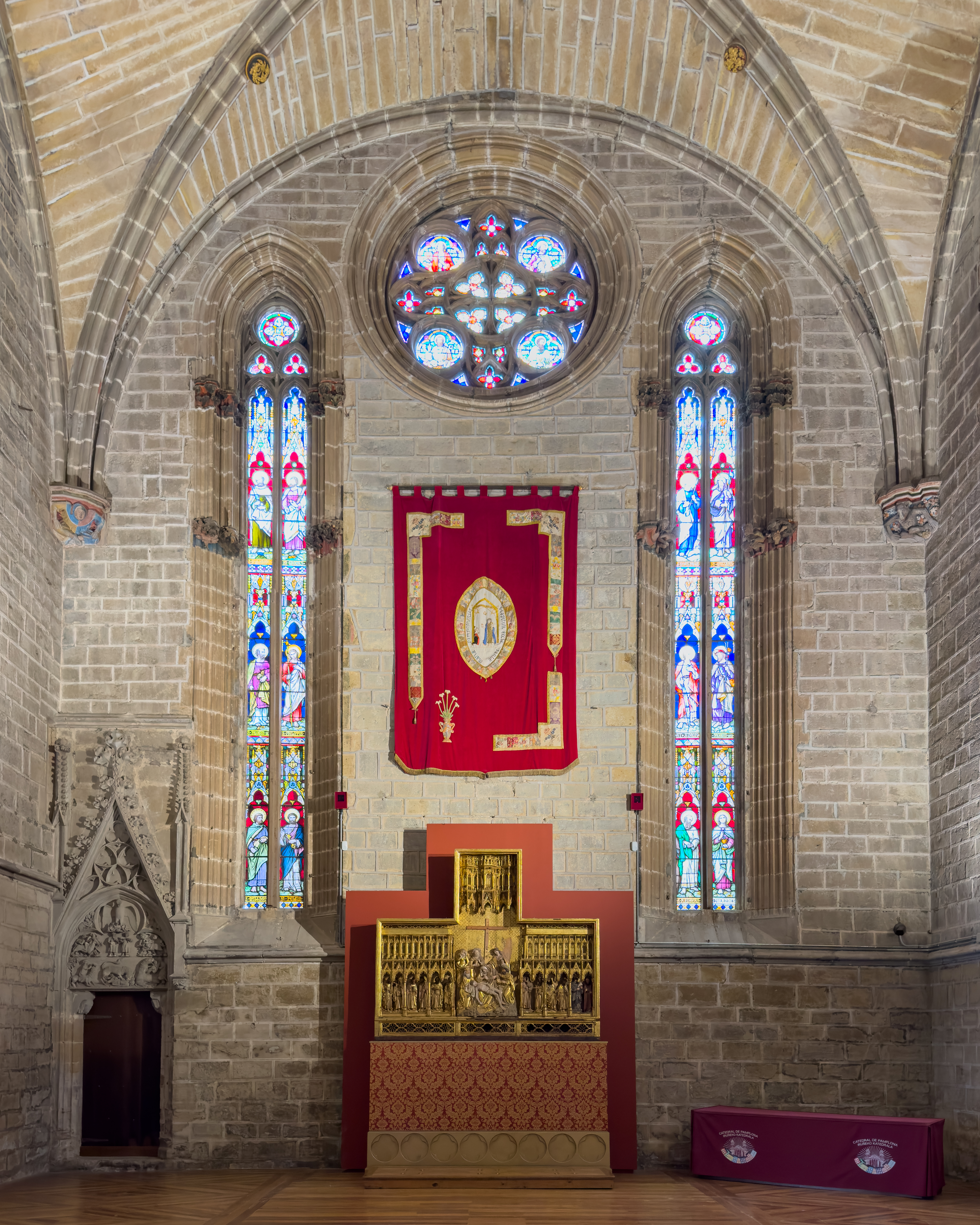

== Bibliography ==
- Jusué Simonena, Carmen (dir.) (1994). La catedral de Pamplona. Caja de Ahorros de Navarra. ISBN 978-84-87120-21-3.
- Arraiza, Jesús: Catedral de Pamplona: la otra historia, Pamplona: Ediciones y Libros, 1994
