= Mathieu d'Escouchy =

Picard chronicler (1420–1482)

Mathieu d'Escouchy (Le Quesnoy, Nord, 1420 – 1482) was a Picard chronicler during the last stages of the Hundred Years War.

His Chronique was a continuation of the chronicle of Enguerrand de Monstrelet, with manuscripts of which it occurs as a third volume; it was edited by G. du Fresne de Beaucourt, (3 vols., Paris, Societé de l'Histoire de France, 1863–64). Matthieu covers the years 1444-61, from a point of view favourable to Burgundy, but with an attempt at impartiality, though he was in the service of Louis XI, with whom he fought at the Battle of Montlhéry (16 July 1465), after which he was ennobled. Like most literate men of his time, he was fascinated by feats of arms, brave tourneys and the social stature of the men (and a few women) who figure in his chronicle. His account of the Banquet du Voeu du Faisan, describes the ceremonious feast held at Lille in 1454 by Philip the Good, Duke of Burgundy, whose court set the standards for elegant extravagance in the fifteenth century.

He was appointed Echevin and Prévôt of Péronne. He fell afoul of justice, was even arrested and tortured but set free at last.

In Escouchy some editors read a variant of the familiar seigneurial name Coucy.

He described the arrival of Mary of Guelders bride of James II in Scotland on 18 June 1449. She sailed from Sluis and landed first on the Isle of May in the Forth, making a pilgrimage to the Chapel of St Adrian on 18 June 1449.

== Sources ==
- G. Du Fresne de Beaucourt, Chronique de Mathieu d'Escouchy: 1444-1452, vol. 1 (Paris, 1863)
- Pasco Bacro, "Matthie d'Escouchy"
- Chronique, 1445: A too-well-educated young man
