= Charles I of Armagnac =

French noble (1425–1497)

Charles d'Armagnac (born 1425; died 3 June 1497 in Castelnau-de-Montmiral at the age of 72 years) was Count of Armagnac and Rodez from 1473 to 1497. He was the son of John IV, Count of Armagnac and Rodez, and Isabella d'Évreux. His older brother, Count John V, was a leader of the League of the Public Weal against King Louis XI of France, causing Charles to be imprisoned for fifteen years. John was killed in a skirmish, allowing Charles to inherit the title of Count of Armagnac.

== Marriage and children ==
On 26 November 1468 he married Catherine de Foix Candale (d. 1510), daughter of Jean de Foix and Margaret Kerdeston. They had no children.

Charles had an illegitimate child;

- Peter, Baron de Caussade.

== Count of Armagnac ==
Charles d'Armagnac died (1497) without legitimate issue and the title of Count of Armagnac was conferred upon his grand-nephew Charles IV, Duke of Alençon.

== Notes ==
Preceded by John V	Count of Armagnac; 1473–1497	Succeeded by Charles II
