= Lancelot of Navarre =

Navarrese noble, b. 1386

Lancelot of Navarre (15 April 1386 – 8 January 1420), also called Lanzarot, was an illegitimate son of King Charles III of Navarre who became vicar general and apostolic administrator of the Diocese of Pamplona and the titular Latin patriarch of Alexandria.

== Family and education ==
Lancelot was born on 15 April 1386 to King Charles III of Navarre and his mistress, Maria Miguel de Esparza. Lancelot lived at the royal court with his mother and his father's other mistresses and illegitimate children, along with their retainers, after Charles III became king in 1387. King Charles's wife, Queen Eleanor, left in protest with her daughters, princesses Joan, Maria, Blanche, and Beatrice. According to historian Elena Woodacre, the queen likely felt that Lancelot was a threat to the rights of his legitimate half-sisters, although illegitimate children were barred from succession by the Fueros. The rift between the king and queen was repaired after their eldest daughter, Joan, was formally sworn in as heir presumptive and Charles promised to treat Eleanor well.

Charles entrusted Lancelot to the care of the royal treasurer, García López de Lizásoain. In 1390, Lancelot's mother retired to a convent. Lancelot's religious education was overseen by the abbot of Zubiurrutia, García de Ballariaín. In 1394 Lancelot made his first public appearance, laying a golden florin under the foundation stone of the newly built Gothic Cathedral of Pamplona. In 1397, he began learning Latin at a grammar school in Pamplona alongside his brother Godfrey and on 24 January 1403 he left to attend the University of Toulouse, where Charles generously supplied him with literature.

== Career ==
The king was determined to make Lancelot bishop of Pamplona, stating this wish to the queen and to his heir in his first testament on 11 June 1403. In November, Charles had two archdeacons nominate Lancelot to become bishop, but the Avignon-based pope, Benedict XIII, declined the request and in 1404 only made Lancelot apostolic notary, archdeacon of Calahorra and sacristan of Vich. Calahorra was in the Kingdom of Castile, however, and the Castilians were only persuaded to agree in 1407.

Benedict refused to make Lancelot bishop even after the see of Pamplona became vacant in 1406, and Charles's embassies to Avignon, led by Lancelot himself, remained unsuccessful. Benedict only relented when he started losing ground in the Western Schism to his Rome-based rival, Gregory XII. Benedict realized that he needed Navarrese support and gave administration of the see to Lancelot in 1408 but forbade Lancelot's episcopal consecration. Lancelot henceforth governed the see as vicar general and apostolic administrator. In 1418 Lancelot received the titular see of Alexandria.

During Lancelot's administration, the chapter chambers were converted into a proper episcopal palace next to the cathedral. He witnessed important royal events such as the proclamation of the second will of his father in 1412 and the coronation of King Ferdinand I of Aragon in 1414. The following year Lancelot marched, along with his brother, Godefroy, to the Viscounty of Béarn to support Count John I of Foix in the Hundred Years' War. In 1418 Lancelot expanded the Aratzuri Castle with his father's help.

== Death and posterity ==
Lancelot led an irregular life for a clergyman, leaving two illegitimate children, Margaret and John, as well as enormous debts. He died in Olite on 8 January 1420 and was buried in the Cathedral of Pamplona.
