= Countess of Foix =

The following is a list of the Countesses of Foix, the consorts of the Counts of Foix. The list is organised by the ruling house and covers the period from 1064 to 1607, when the County of Foix was merged into the French Crown.

== Countess of Foix ==
=== House of Foix, 1010-1302 ===
Picture	Name	Father	Birth	Marriage	Became Countess	Ceased to be Countess	Death	Spouse
	Ledgarde	-	-	-	1064 husband's accession	1071 husband's death	after 1074	Peter-Bernard
	Sicarda	-	-	1073		1076 or after		Roger II
	Stephanie de Besalú	William II, Count of Besalú (Bellonids)	-	-		1124 husband's death	-	Roger II
unnamed first wife								Roger III
	Jimena of Barcelona	Ramon Berenguer III, Count of Barcelona (Barcelona)	1117/18	before 8 July 1130		after 1136		Roger III
	Philippa	probably a member of the House of Montcada	-	1189		27 March 1223 husband's death	-	Raymond-Roger
	Ermesinda, Viscountess of Castelbón	Arnaldo, Viscount of Castelbón	-	10 January 1203	27 March 1223 husband's accession	after 28 December 1229		Roger-Bernard II
	Ermengarde of Narbonne	Aimery III, Viscount of Narbonne (Lara)	-	23 January 1232		26 May 1241 husband's death	-	Roger-Bernard II
	Brunissenda of Cardona	Ramon Folch IV, Viscount of Cardona	-	17 February 1231	26 May 1241 husband's accession	24 February 1265 husband's death	1289	Roger IV
	Margaret, Viscountess of Béarn	Gaston VII, Viscount of Béarn (Montcada)	1245/50	14 October 1252	24 February 1265 husband's accession	3 March 1302 husband's death	after 1310	Roger-Bernard III

=== House of Foix-Béarn, 1302-1412 ===
Picture	Name	Father	Birth	Marriage	Became Countess	Ceased to be Countess	Death	Spouse
	Joan of Artois	Philip of Artois (Artois)	1289	October 1301	3 March 1302 husband's accession	13 December 1315 husband's death	after 24 March 1350	Gaston I
	Eleanore de Comminges	Bernard VII, Count of Comminges (Comminges)	1289	1327		26 September 1343 husband's death	after 16 May 1365	Gaston II
	Agnes of Navarre	Philip III of Navarre (Evreux)	after 1337	4 August 1349		December 1362 repudiated	4 February 1396/1400	Gaston III
	Joanna of Aragon	John I of Aragon (Barcelona)	October 1375	4 June 1392		August 1398 husband's death	September 1407	Matthew

=== House of Foix-Grailly, 1412-1517 ===
Picture	Name	Father	Birth	Marriage	Became Countess	Ceased to be Countess	Death	Spouse
	Joan of Navarre	Charles III of Navarre (Évreux)	1382	12 November 1402	1412 husband's accession	July 1413		John I
	Jeanne d'Albret	Charles I of Albret (Albret)	1403	23 May 1422		1435		John I
	Joanna of Urgell	James II, Count of Urgell (Barcelona)	1415	May 1436		4 May 1436 husband's death	1446 or after	John I
	Eleanor of Navarre	John II of Aragon (Trastámara)	2 February 1426	30 July 1436		5/28 July 1472 husband's accession	12 February 1479	Gaston IV

=== House of Albret, 1517-1572 ===
Picture	Name	Father	Birth	Marriage	Became Countess	Ceased to be Countess	Death	Spouse
	Marguerite of Angoulême	Charles, Count of Angoulême (Valois-Angoulême)	11 April 1492	24 January 1527		21 December 1549		Henry I

=== House of Bourbon, 1572-1607 ===
Picture	Name	Father	Birth	Marriage	Became Countess	Ceased to be Countess	Death	Spouse
	Marguerite of France	Henry II of France (Valois)	14 May 1553	18 August 1572		17 December 1599 divorce	27 March 1615	Henry II
	Marie de' Medici	Francesco I de' Medici, Grand Duke of Tuscany (Medici)	26 April 1575	5 October 1600		1607; Foix merged into Crown	3 July 1642	Henry II

== See also ==
- List of Navarrese consorts
