= Palace of the Kings of Navarre of Olite =

Fortification in Navarre, Spain

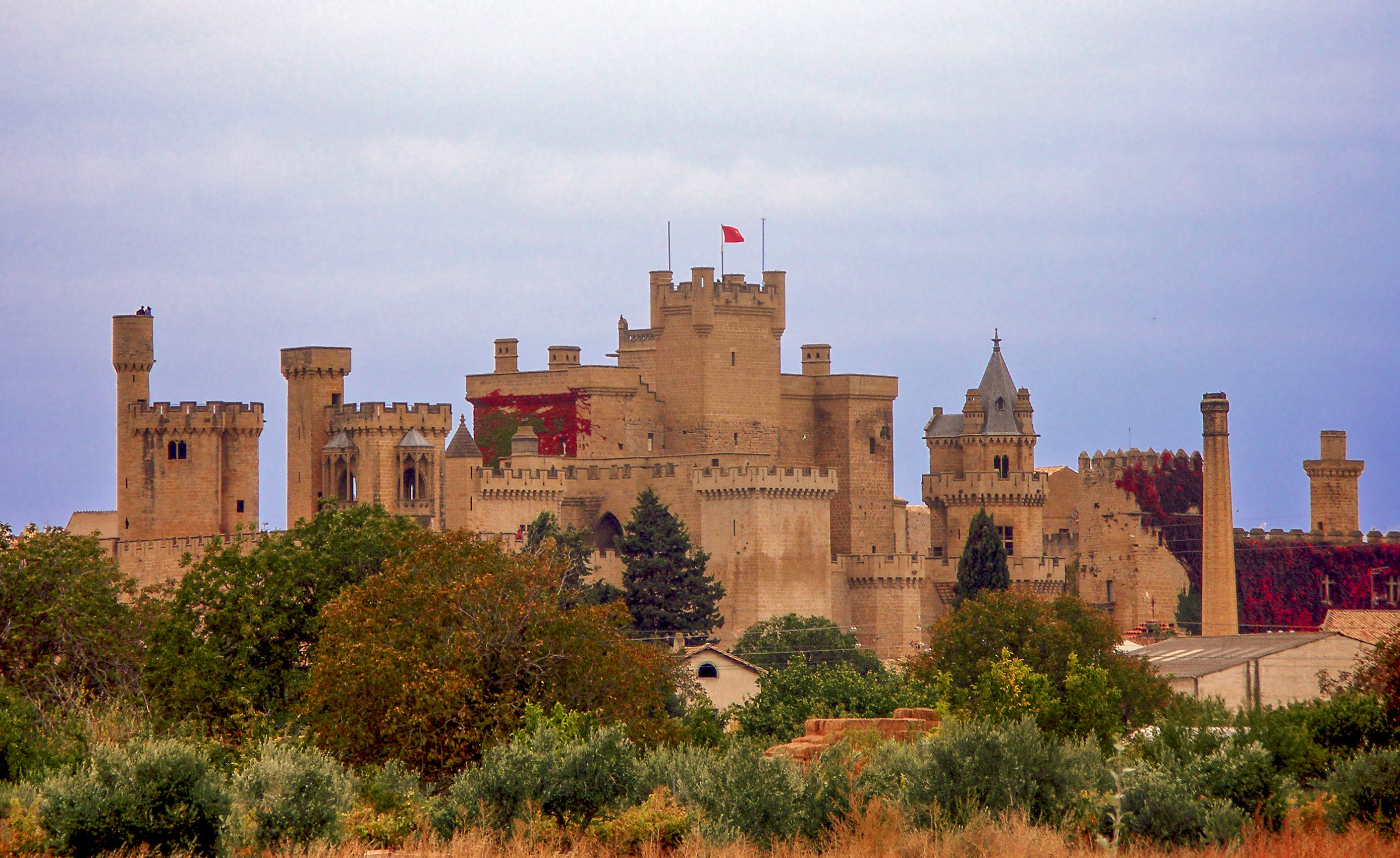
- South façade

General information
- Type: Castle-palace
- Architectural style: Gothic
- Location: Merindad de Olite, Navarre, Spain
- Coordinates: 42°28′54″N 01°38′58″W

Design and construction
- Architects: Martín Périz de Estella (master builder, New Palace)

The Palace of the Kings of Navarre of Olite or Royal Palace of Olite is a castle-palace in the town of Olite, in Navarre, Spain. It was a residence of the kings and queens of the Kingdom of Navarre until the kingdom's union with Castile in the 16th century; its most important transformations date from the reign of Charles III "the Noble" (1387 to 1425). It is the most visited tourist site in Navarre.

Surely there is no king with a more beautiful castle or palace and with so many gilded rooms (...) it could not say or even could imagine how magnificent and sumptuous is this palace (...)

— A 15th-century German traveller wrote his impressions in his diary, now conserved in the British Museum in London.

The palace was largely destroyed during the Peninsular War: in 1813 the guerrilla general Espoz y Mina set it on fire to prevent its occupation by French forces. It was restored in the 20th century by the provincial government of Navarre, following a project by the brothers José and Javier Yárnoz Larrosa, and was declared a National Monument in 1925.

== History ==
The site has Roman origins; a castle stood there from the 13th century and served as an occasional residence of the kings of Navarre. This older building, known as the Old Palace, was used by Theobald II and Henry I in the 1260s and 1270s, and by Charles II in the 1380s; the Navarrese court travelled and did not have a fixed seat.

Charles III commissioned the New Palace beside the old one. Work began around 1388 and was still under way in 1424, under the king's master builder Martín Périz de Estella. The king brought in the sculptors Johan Lome and Pedro Jalopa, the carpenter Lope Barbicano of Tudela, the painter Enrique de Estencop of Aragon and the tapestry maker Lucien Bertolomeu.

After the conquest of Navarre in 1512 the palace declined. In 1525 Pedro de Navarra was allowed to live there on condition that he repair it at his own cost, and his heirs carried out repairs in the 1550s, but a survey in 1571 warned that without urgent work the buildings would collapse. In 1584 the Marquis of Almazán restored the main façade of the Old Palace and placed the arms of Philip II on it.

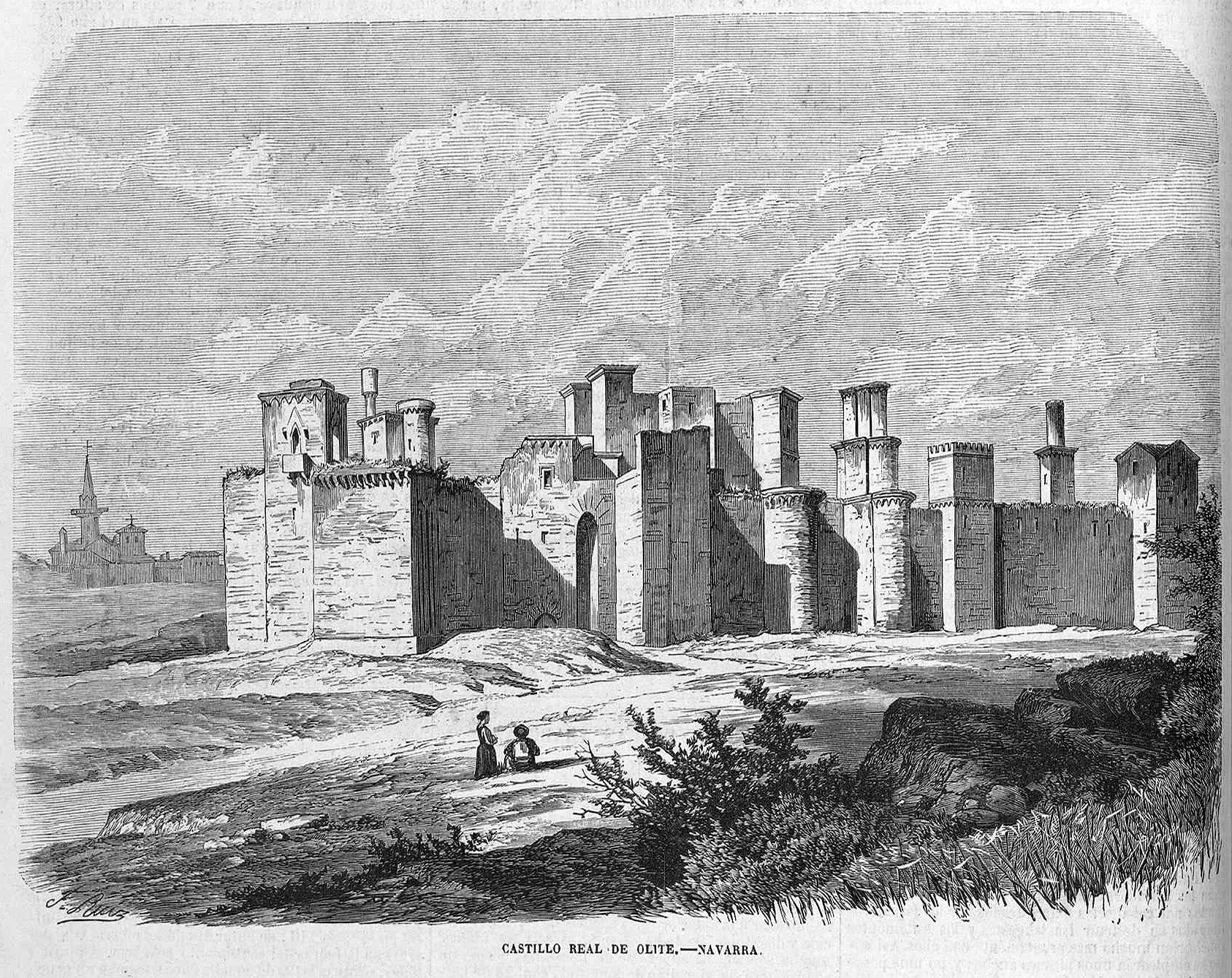
The ruined palace in 1866, as published in El Museo Universal

In 1813, during the Peninsular War, the guerrilla general Espoz y Mina set fire to the palace so that French troops could not occupy it. The war left the palace in ruins.

=== Restoration ===
The palace was declared a National Monument in 1925. The provincial government of Navarre, through its Institución Príncipe de Viana, restored it to a project by the architects José and Javier Yárnoz Larrosa, who studied the documents on the palace in the Archivo General de Navarra; the brothers had won a competition for the work held in 1926. The building works began in 1937 and were completed in 1967.

The restoration has been described as free in places: the tops of several towers and walls were recreated, so the palace's present appearance differs from what written and graphic records describe. The raised garden on the noble floor, originally framed by four galleries known in medieval documents as la calostra, was rebuilt with three galleries and new arches modelled on late Gothic work; its only surviving original element is a carved corbel.

=== Present day ===
The Old Palace has been converted into a Parador hotel. The New Palace is open to visitors. In 2023 it received a record 260,519 visitors, more than 50% more than two years earlier, making it the most visited tourist site in Navarre; 16% came from abroad.

== Description ==
The Palace of the Kings of Navarre of Olite (castle palace of Olite) consists of three cores: the Old Palace, the New Palace and the church iglesia de Santa María la Real.

=== Old Palace ===
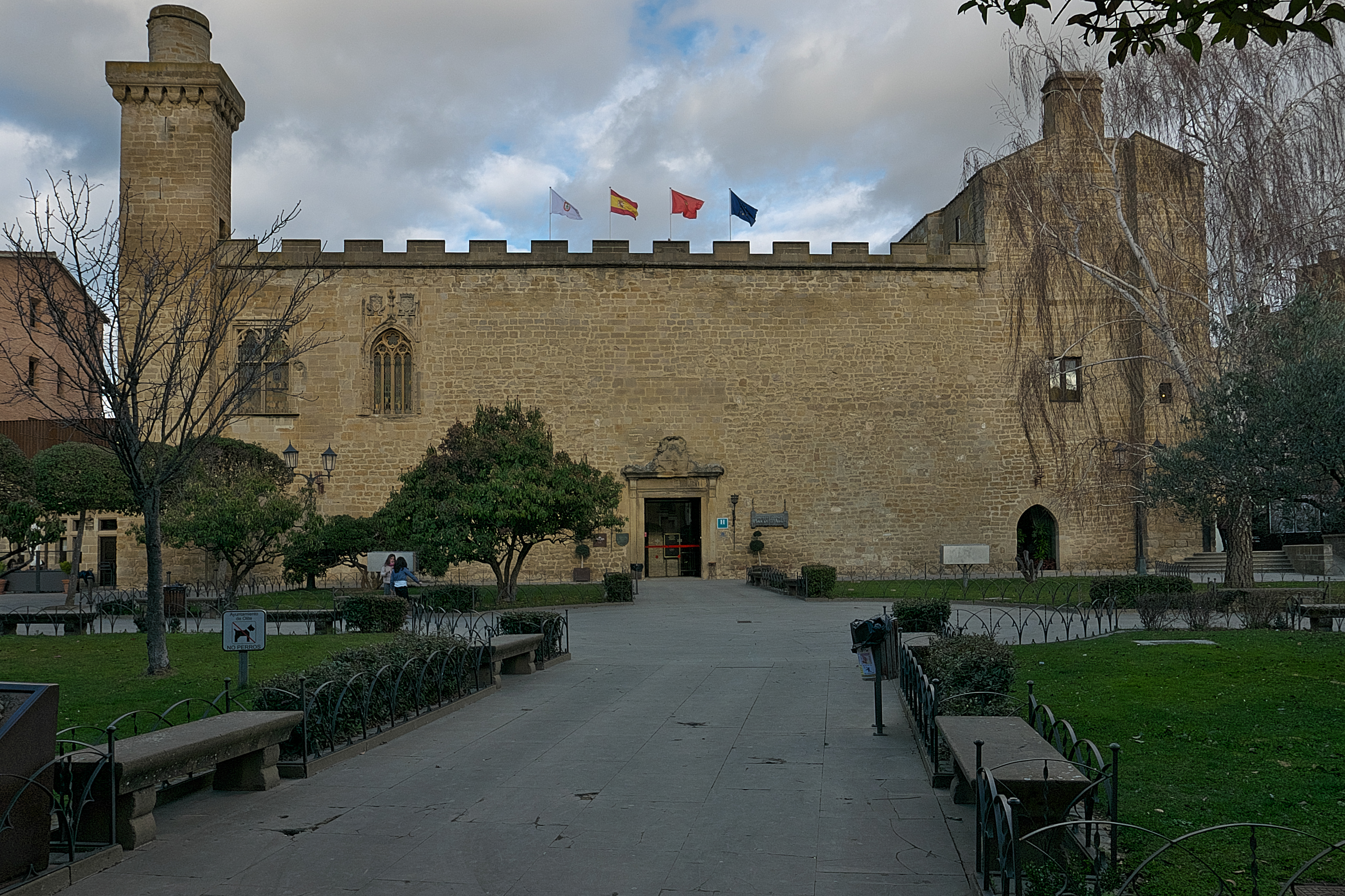
Old Palace

The Old Palace, built in the 13th century in gothic style, is structured around a rectangular courtyard around which the rooms were arranged. On the ground floor there were the stores and the chapel of St George, built before 1357. Also on the ground floor stood the royal court's Great Hall, the main gate to which is on the main façade. The Great Hall was topped by three towers. Today only two remain: the central one, above the main door, was removed in 1414. On the upper floor several chambers existed, including the "Cambra luenga" (Long chamber) and the adjacent "Cambra de doña Juana" (chamber of doña Juana).

With the development of the New Palace in the 14th century, the royal court moved out the Old Palace. Parts of the Old Palace were thereafter used as stables, kitchens, and other secondary dependencies. In 1584 the Marquis of Almazán restored the main façade of Old Palace, placing the coat of arms of Philip II of Spain in it. This coat of arms is still visible today, but very deteriorated. The Old Palace eventually entered into a state of disrepair, and was largely abandoned. Most of its internal structure fell to ruin, although its main façade and four towers survived. The building was restored in the 20th century, but the internal chambers had been lost beyond repair. The four remaining towers are known as Torre de San Jorge (tower of St George), Torre de la Prisión (Tower of the prison), Torre de la Cigueña or de la Atalaya (Tower of the crane); the fourth tower has no specific name.

Nowadays, the Old Palace is a Parador de Turismo hotel called "Principe de Viana" facing a square known as Plaza de los Teobaldos. Nothing remains of the original internal structure of the old palace, except for the walls and outer façade have a Gothic window somewhat deteriorated with two shields on top among the pinnacles of the window.

=== Iglesia de Santa María la Real ===
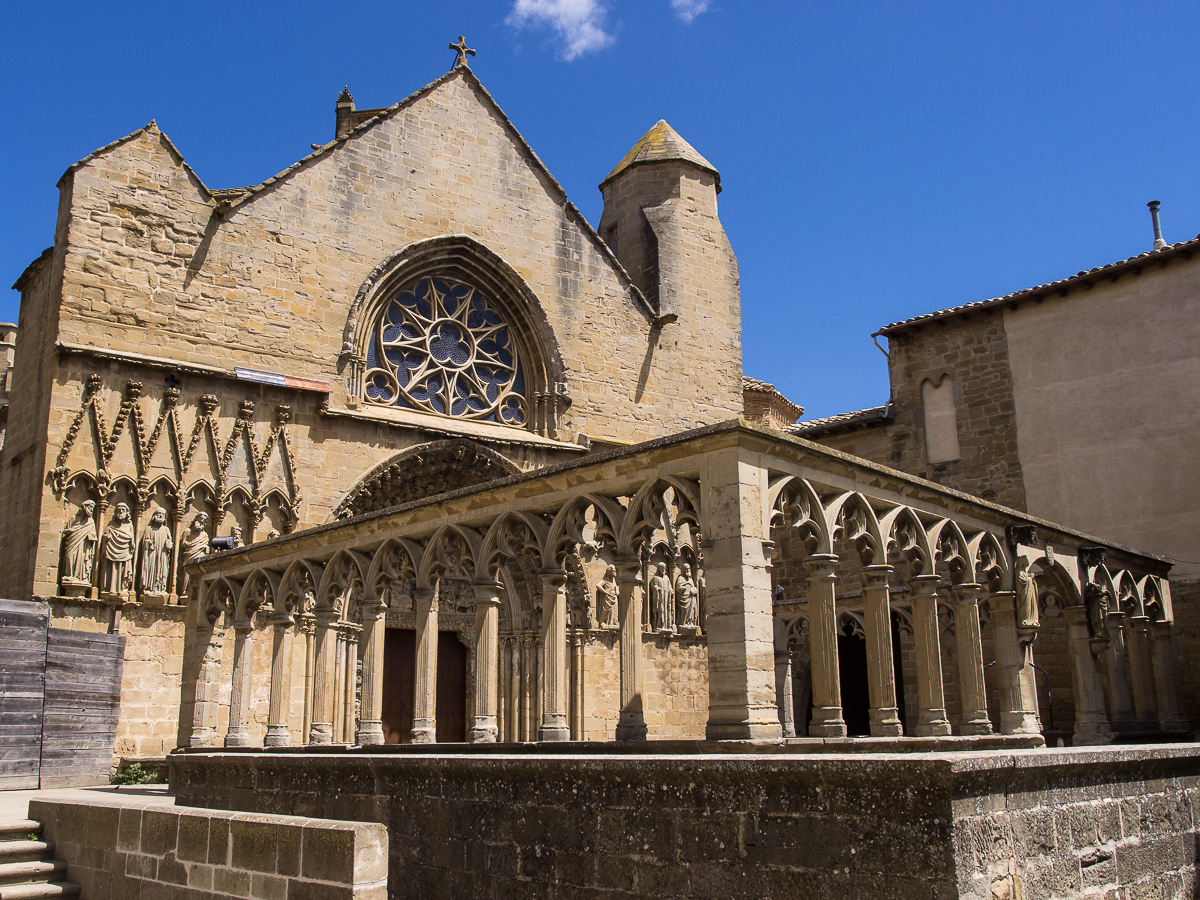
Gothic Iglesia de Santa María la Real located inside the palace, with its cloister.

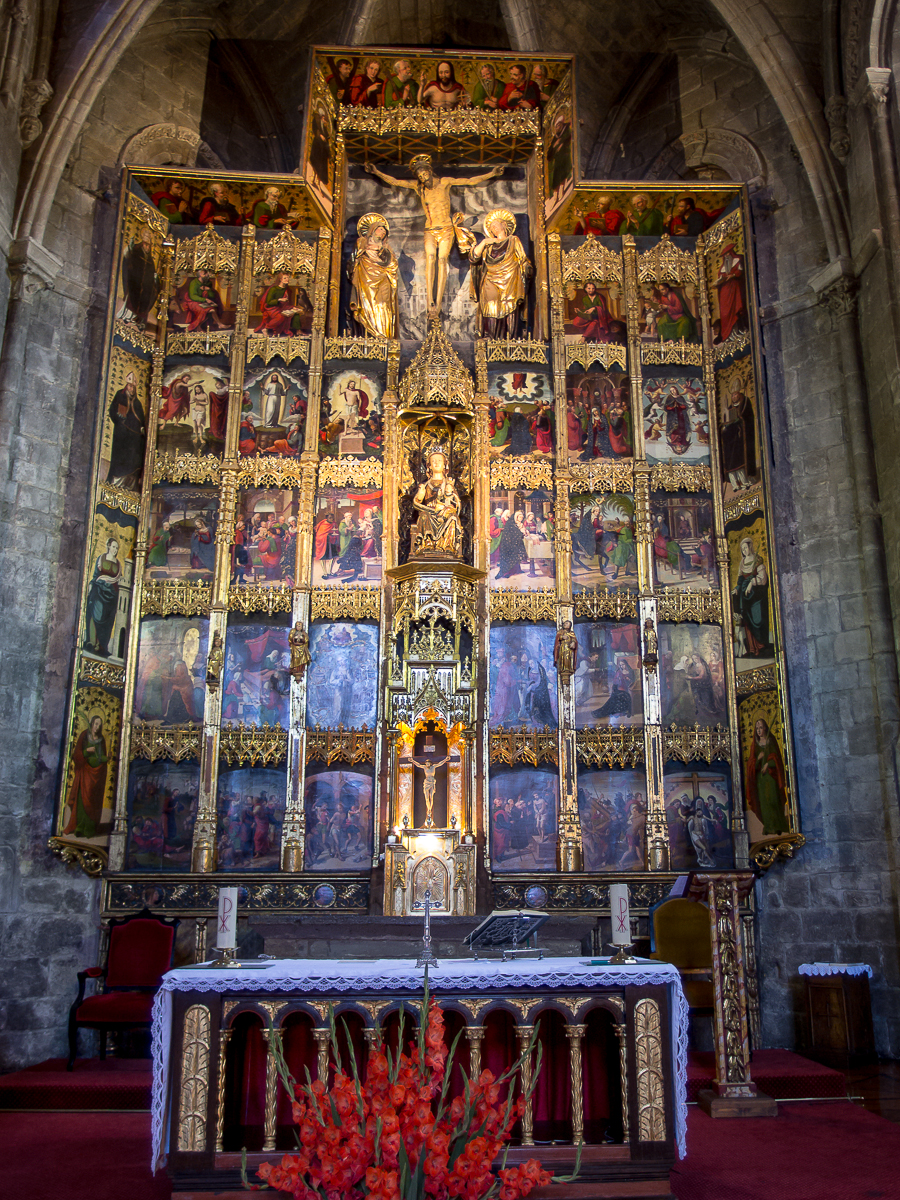
Renaissance reredos

(Basque: Andre Maria Erreginaren eliza, Erriberri)

The Gothic church inside the royal palace, built in 13th-century. It highlights consist of five decorated pointed archivolts, like the tympanum which is represented an image of Saint Mary head of the temple. On both sides are a group of blind arches with images representing the Apostles. In front of its main façade is a beautiful cloister of the same period.

Inside stands the 16th-century Renaissance reredos attributed to Pedro de Aponte, presided over by a Gothic sculpture of the Virgin.

Although the church is located between the Old Palace and the New Palace, was not Palatine temple, as the kings had their own chapel, known as Chapel of San Jorge.

=== New Palace ===
New Palace, its front opens to the square called Plaza de Carlos III el Noble. At the end of 14th-century the King of Navarre Charles III "the Noble" of the House of Évreux, commissioned expansion works at the Old Palace in order to give the court a stationary and stable residence. While the first work consisted of repairs to the building and opening new spaces for courtiers, needs soon outgrew the castle, so the King had to consider the construction of new buildings that could accommodate the royal court. Additionally, his wife Elanor of Castile did not feel special predilection for the Old Palace considering it old and uncomfortable, which motivated the construction of a new Palace-Castle.

Charles III married Eleanor of Castile in 1375 and had eight children; Blanche that would be Queen of Navarre between 1425 and 1442 and Prince of Viana's mother, this prince would die without leaving issue. Charles III is buried in the Cathedral of Pamplona with his wife who had died in 1415.

Between 1395 and 1400 several houses along the Old Palace were purchased in order to begin construction. Driven by Elanor of Castile the Old Palace was expanded from behind the iglesia de Santa María la Real.

The main works were directed by the king's master builder, Martín Périz de Estella; they began around 1388 and were still being completed in 1424.

Built with large stone walls, the additions adopted a polygonal shape with incoming and outgoing somewhat untidy and numerous towers covered with slate roofs instead of the originals that were covered with lead roofs.

At the time the castle palace was considered the height of the most luxurious European courts. The interior decoration, of which nothing remains except a small remainder was composed of plasterwork, tiled and azulejos, stained glasses and gilded coffered ceilings. The floors and walls were covered with tapestries.

Many artists of various nationalities worked at the palace, example of Eclecticism prevailing in the courtly constructions of the time; French influence is evident in towers, windows and balconies, while the Hispanic transpires in adarves flown on dogs in degradation as well as coffered ceilings, tiles and plasterwork.

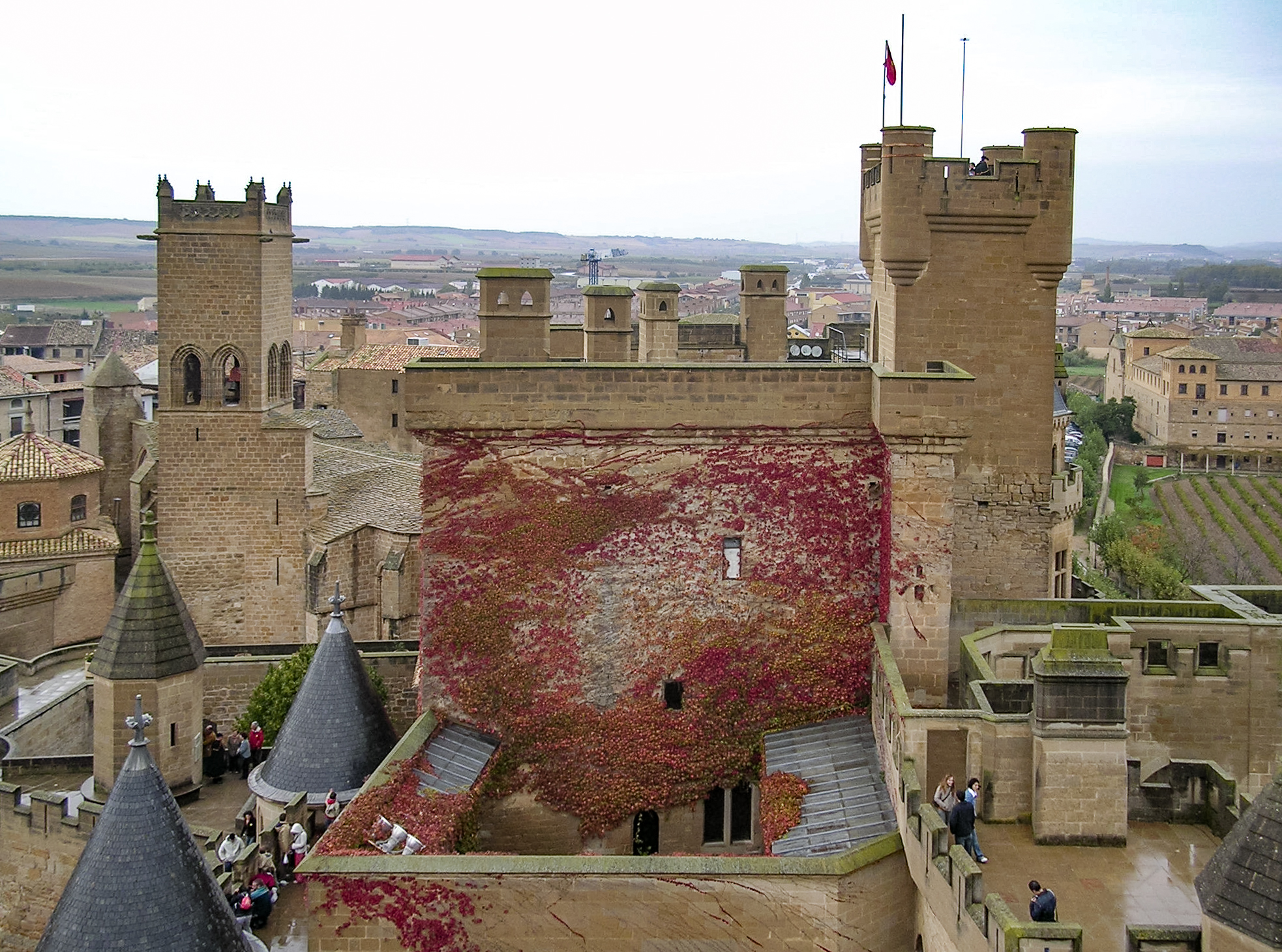
The hanging gardens

In addition the palace had hanging gardens, some nearly 20 meters high, garden areas, orchards and a zoological park that included a lion (gift from the king of Aragon Peter IV the Ceremonious), a camel, parrots, hunting dogs, hawks, four African buffalos, a giraffe, squirrels etc.

The entrance to the palace is through Plaza de Carlos III el Noble. The cover consists of a semicircular arch leads into an inner square known as Patio de los Naranjos, because in this place the King had placed orange plants and other fruit trees. Today the floor is paved but originally was a garden with trees and flowers of various species: lemon, orange, Alexandria's jasmine, mulberries etc.

From this place can observe the external structure of iglesia de Santa María la Real's apse and the start of the temple's tower.

The care of the gardens were many gardeners, although in the care of them also involved the kings themselves, more than anything else as entertainment. For watering gardens a complicated system of irrigation was performed using lead pipes it was made in 1409 by Juan D'Espernou and later in 1414 by John Nelbort of Bristol. As the winter was cold, the trees were protected by awnings that were attached to the walls, in the manner of greenhouses.

==== Sala de las excavaciones ====
(Excavations's room), it was the palace's old guard room. In this room was found a vaulted room whose function is unknown, and it was filled with materials from the Old Palace.

==== Sala de los Arcos ====
(Archs's room) also known as Bat's cave. this popular name came for its almost total absence of light and that is a large room whose only function is to support the weight of the Queen's garden located at the top. It is covered with large pointed arches.

==== Cuerpo principal or Gran Torre ====
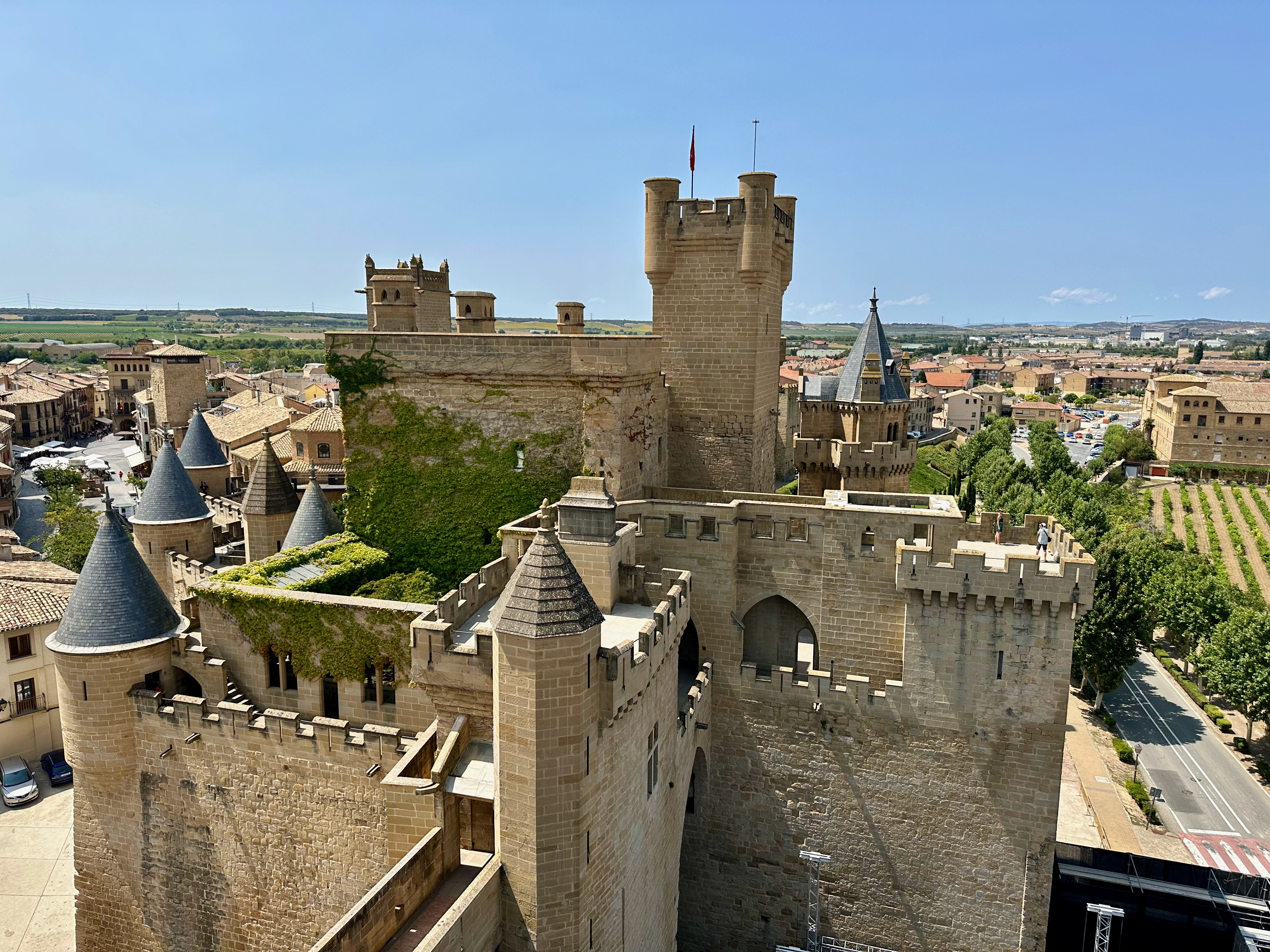
Main body

(Main body or Great Tower) is the main body of the Castle, on the first floor is the apartments of King and Queen, on the second floor is the Exhibition Room, with the exhibition "Olite, throne of a Kingdom ". Continuing up the spiral staircase arrived at the Tower of Homage. A total of 133 steps.

==== Torre del Homenaje ====
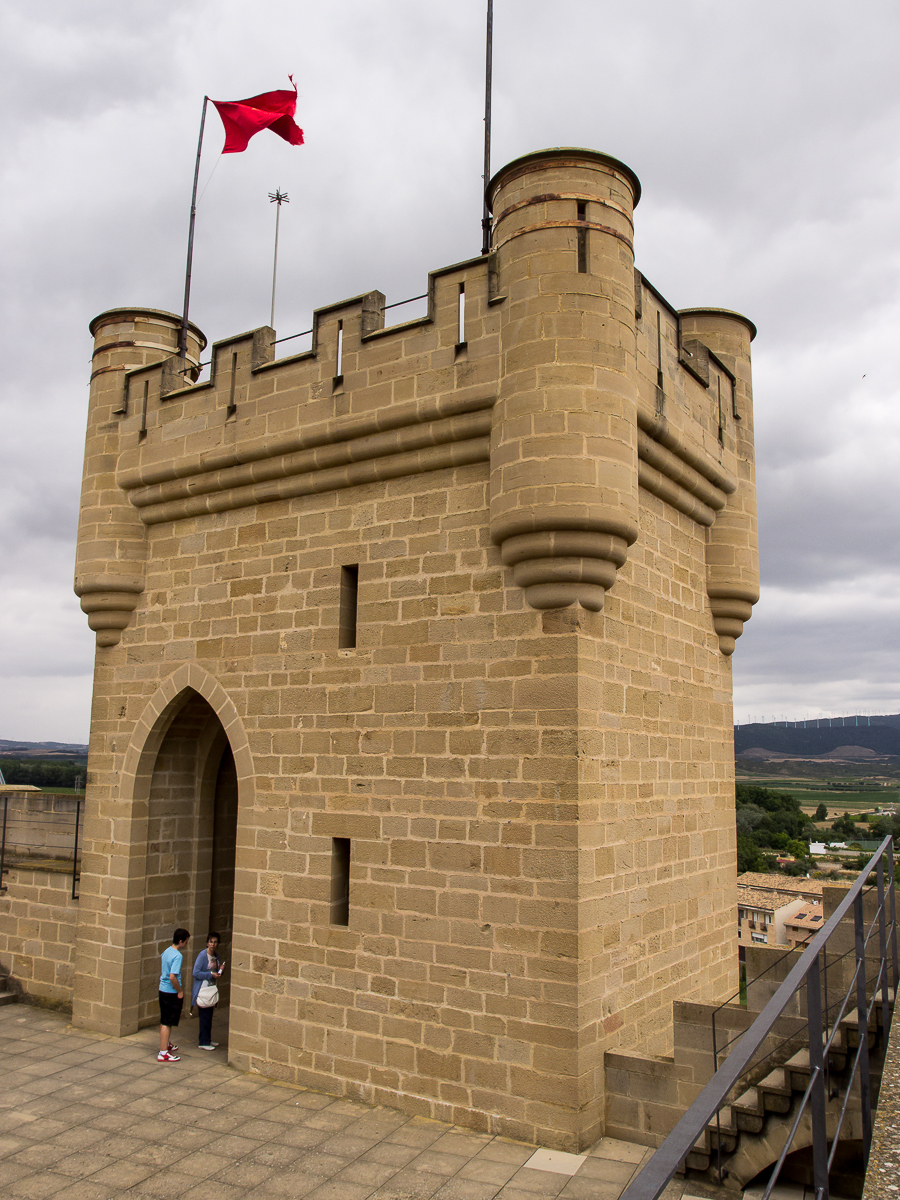
Torre del Homenaje

(Tower of Homage) known as the Torre de la Vit (vit in French is snail, and is named for the spiral staircase that runs along its inside). 40 meters high, is the highest tower of the palace, this tower is the only concession of a military nature that can be found in the palace. Rectangular base, on the corners of its terrace are four small circular turrets that give a certain lightness to the sturdy walls of ashlar. On the main floor in addition to the main rooms of the king and queen, can find some minor rooms that were to be used by the ladies and the kings service.

==== Sala de la Reina ====
(Queen's room) This is the private rooms of the Queen, featuring the chimney and stone benches located next to windows. It was decorated with wooden baseboards, tapestries, paintings and plasterwork of Morisco tradition. The floor was paved with glazed bricks, while the ceilings sported wood paneling with gold accents. The windows were closed with stained glass. Beside it a small room known as Queen's toilet. The floors were covered with carpets and tapestries.

==== Sala del Rey ====
(King's room) is a large room that served mainly as banquet facilities, also has another small room that was used as a resting place of the monarch. It has stone chimney and large Gothic windows with benches.

==== Cámara de los Yesos or Sala Mudéjar ====
(Plasters's chamber or Mudéjar room). This is the only space that preserves the original plasterwork decoration. There are ten panels made in plaster by Morisco masters, representing heraldic shields, stars, bows, Islamic geometric patterns and vegetal decoration. One motif that appears is the chestnut leaves of Charles III's badge. The room is usually closed to the public, only opened by arrangement, to avoid damaging the plasterwork that are in pretty bad condition. The panels, left to right are pictured below:

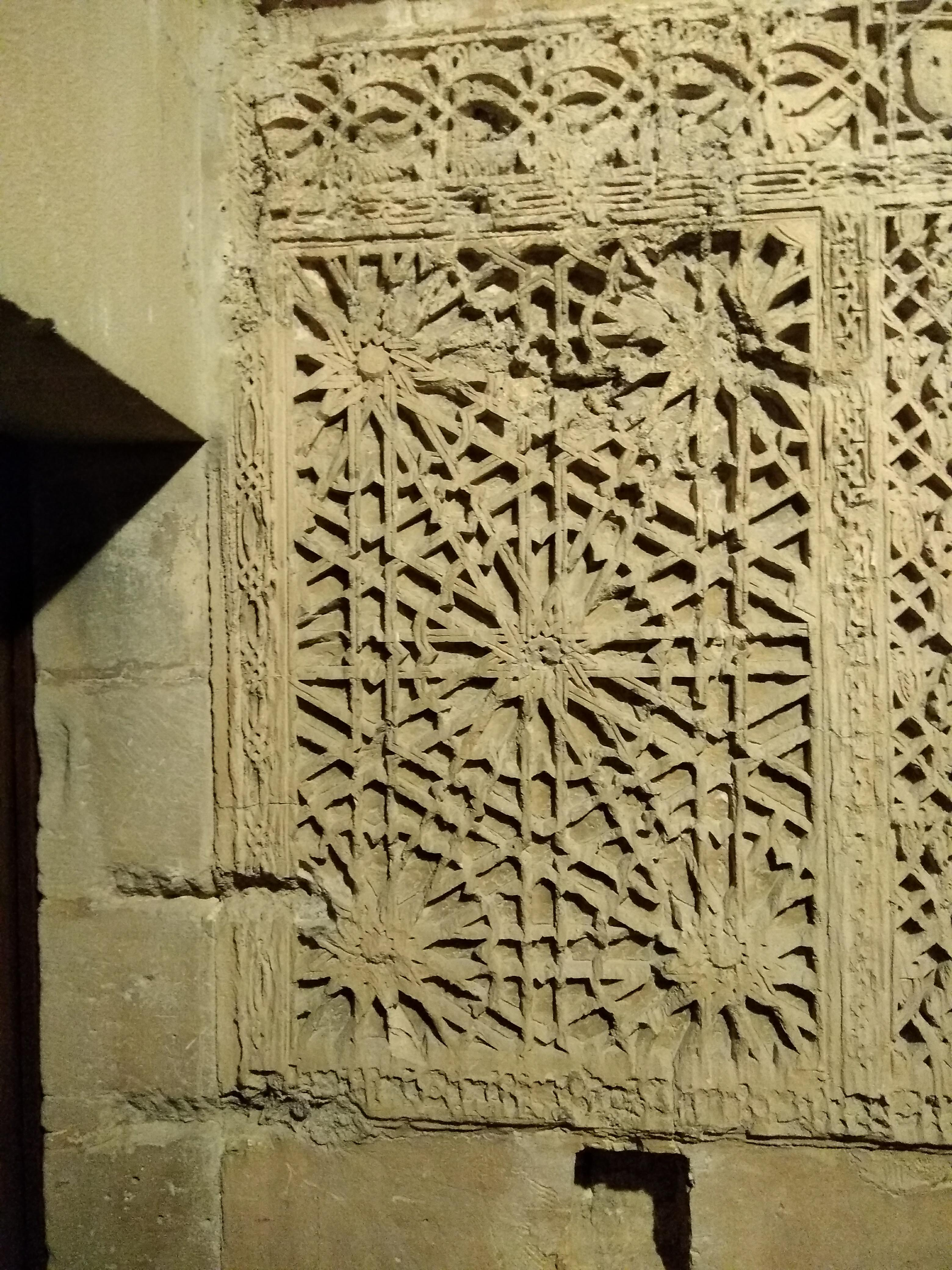
Panel 1

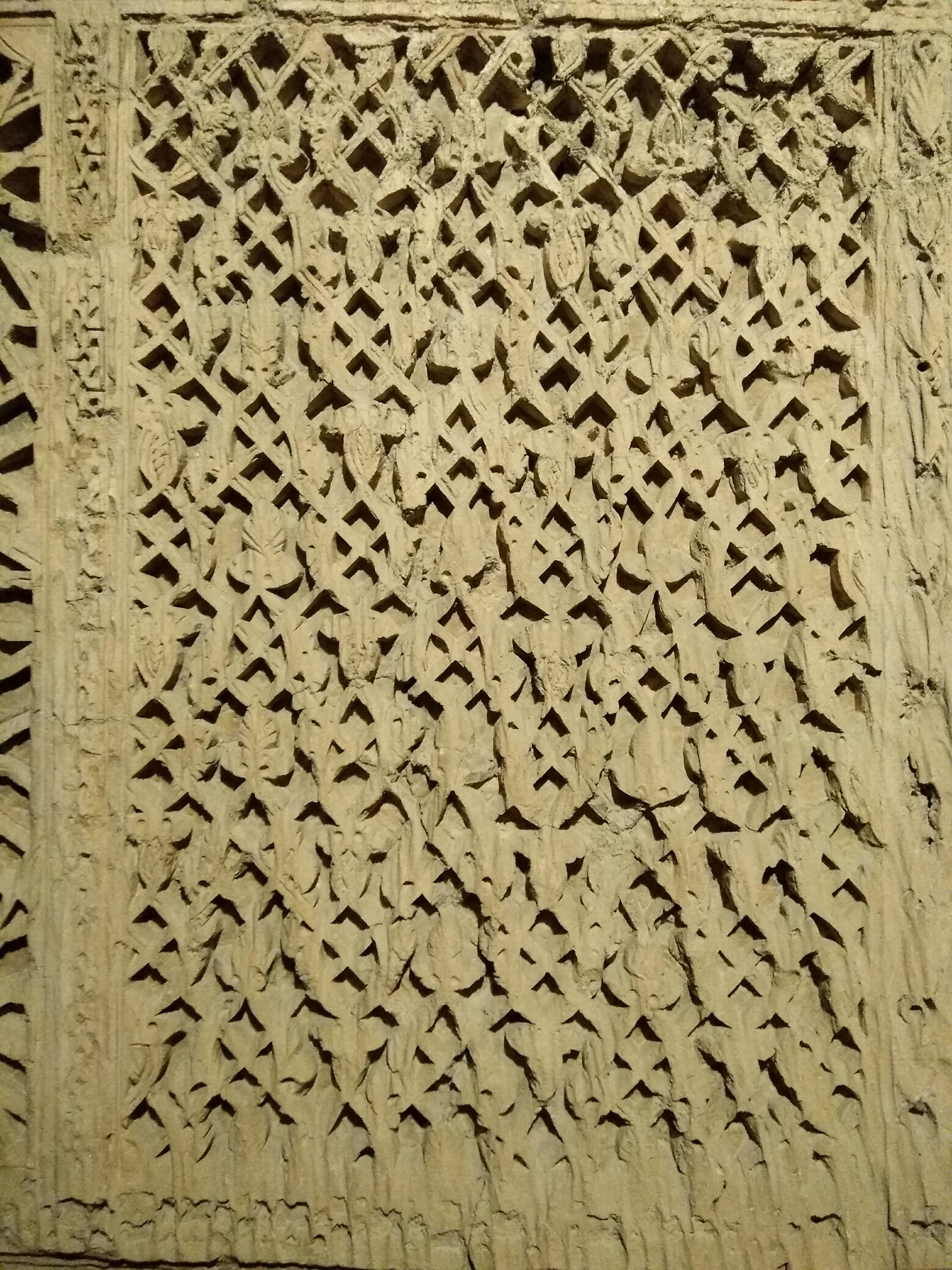
Panel 2

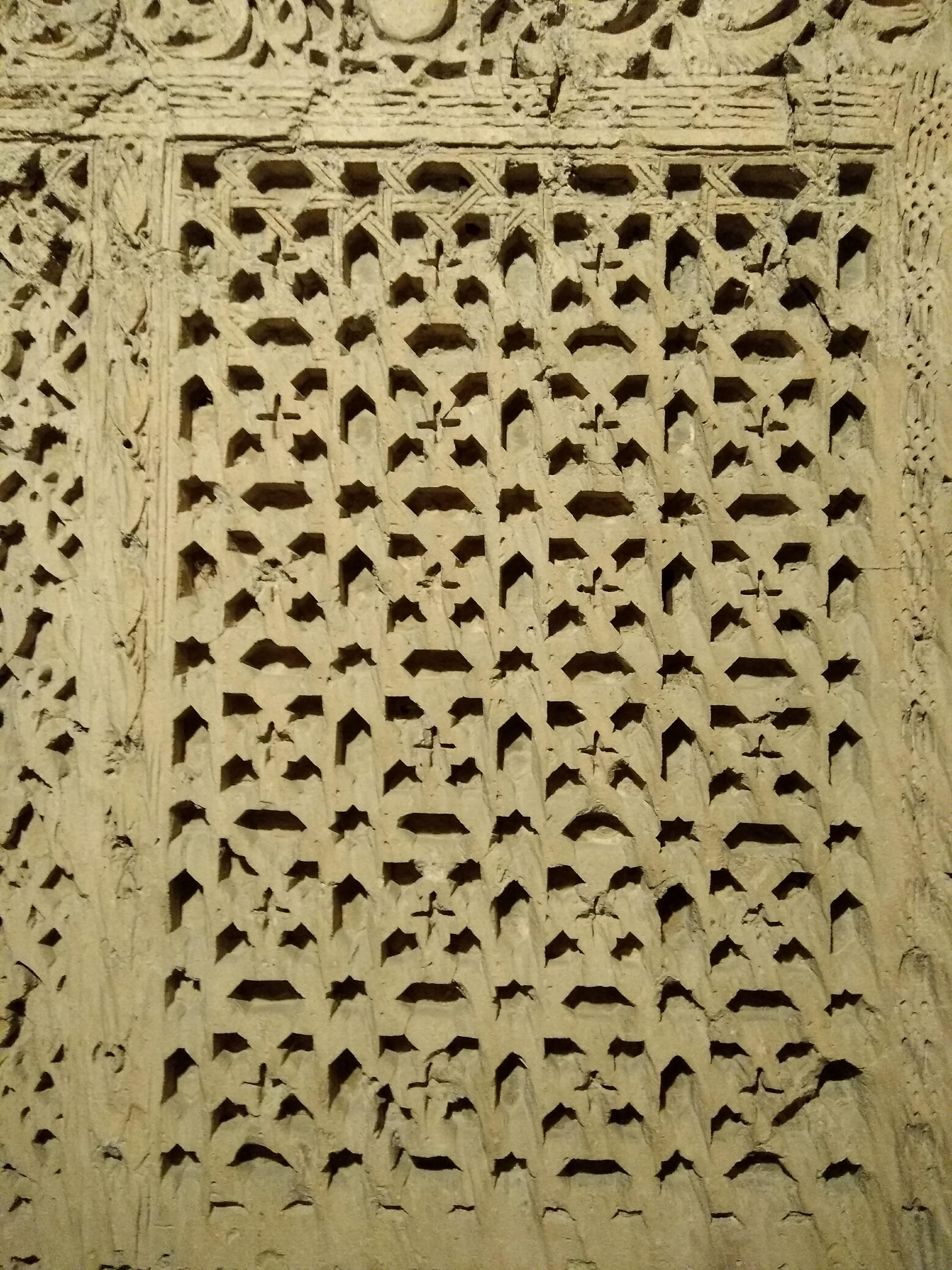
Panel 3

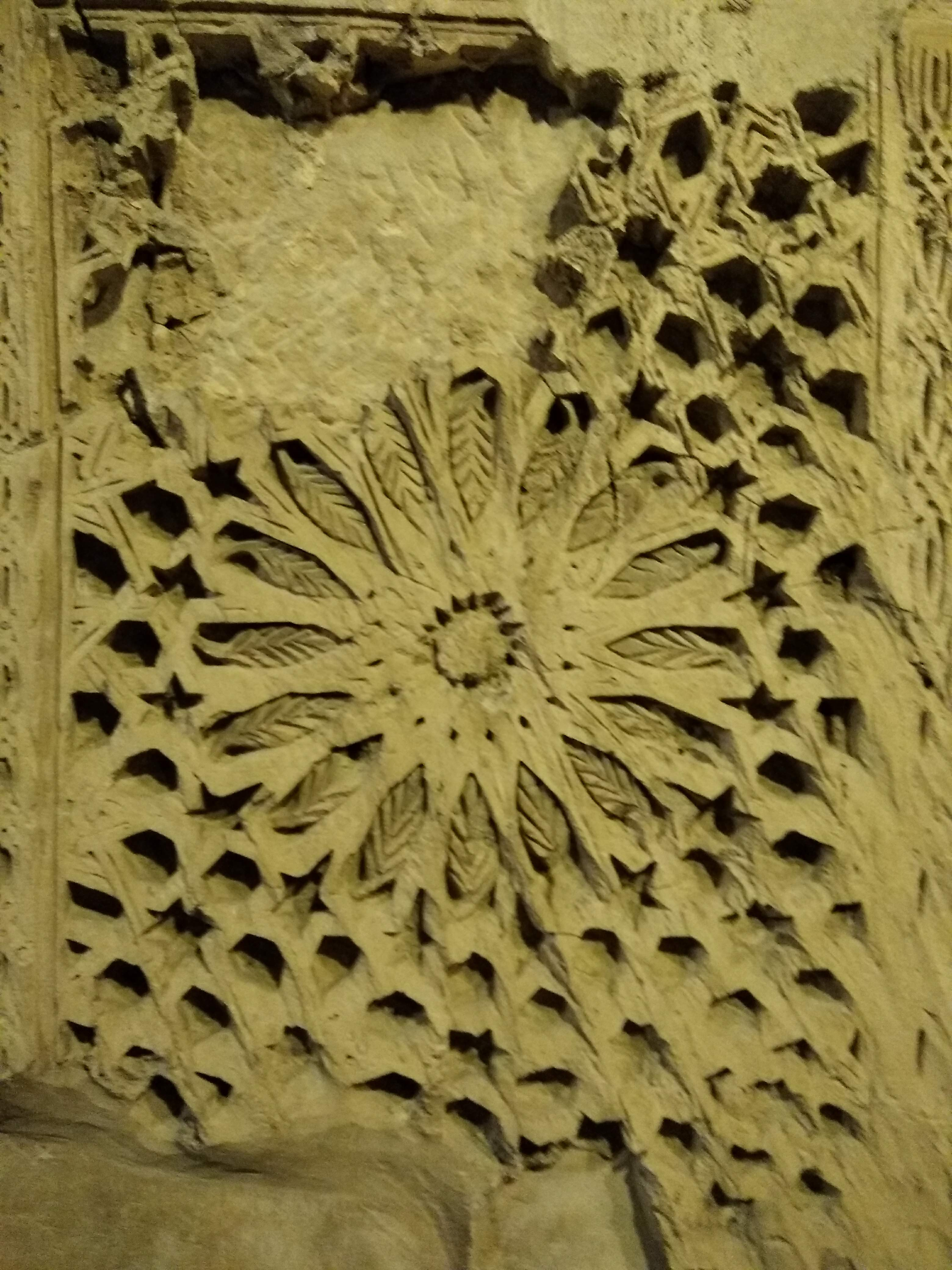
Panel 4

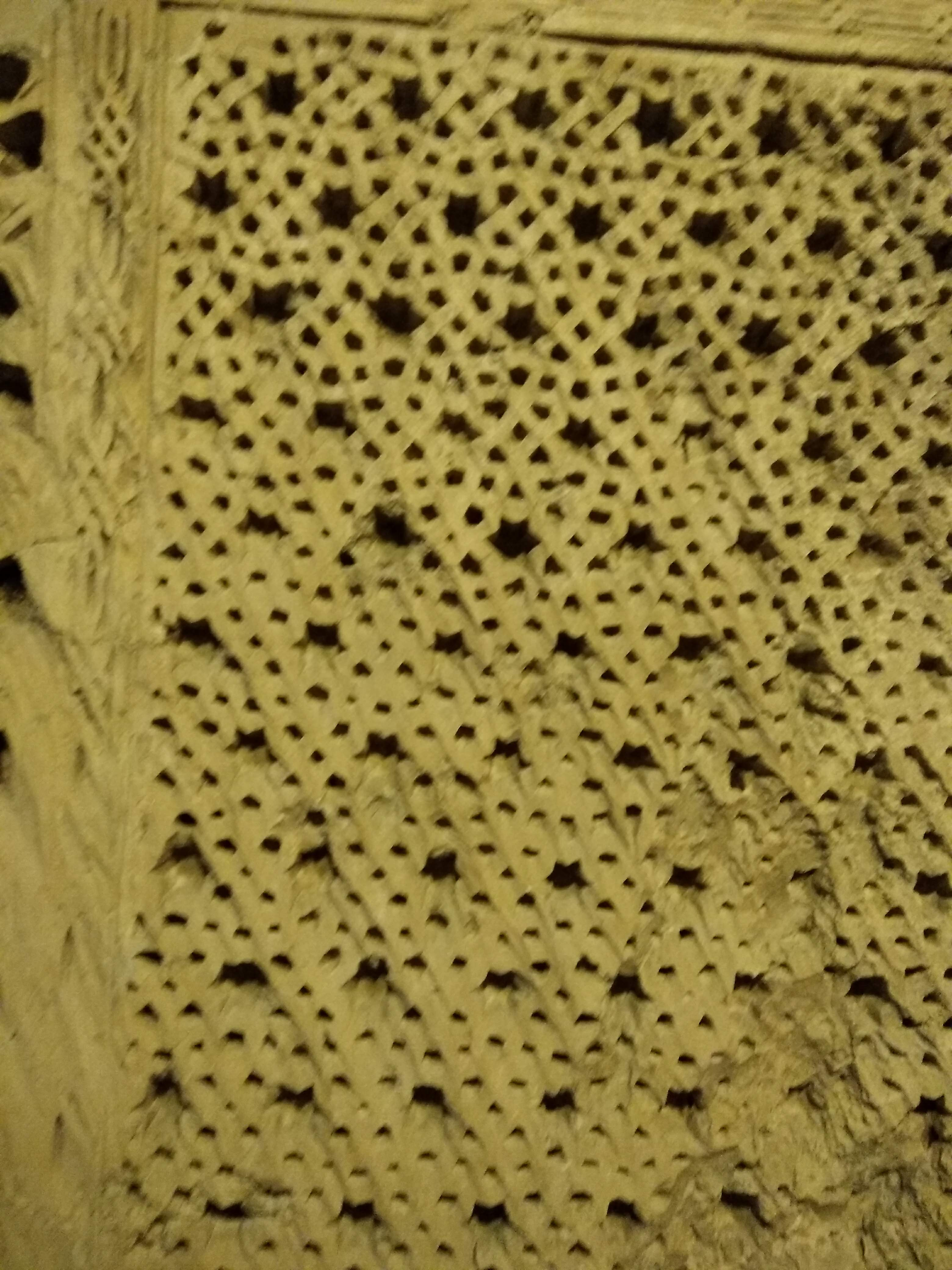
Panel 5

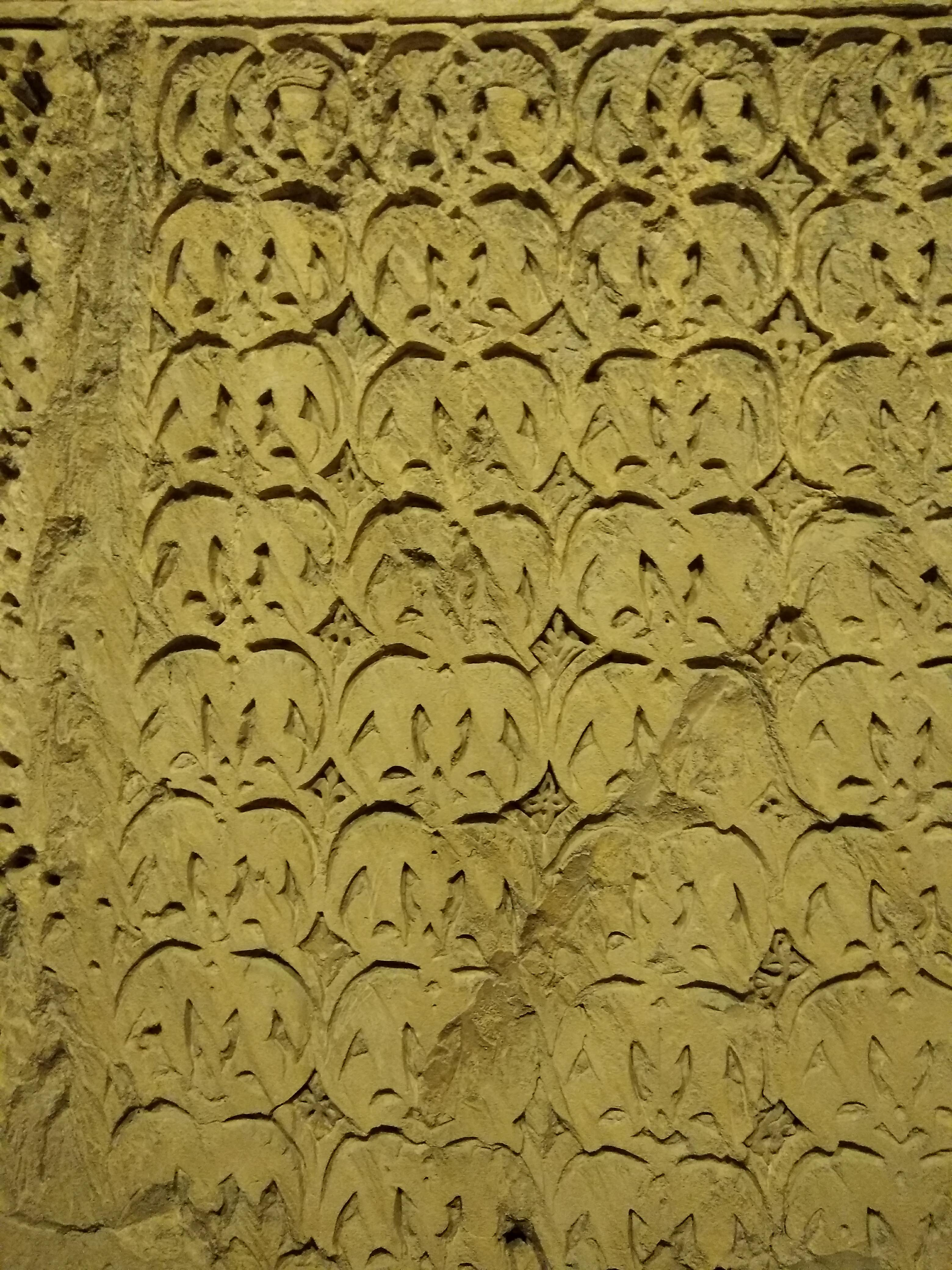
Panel 6

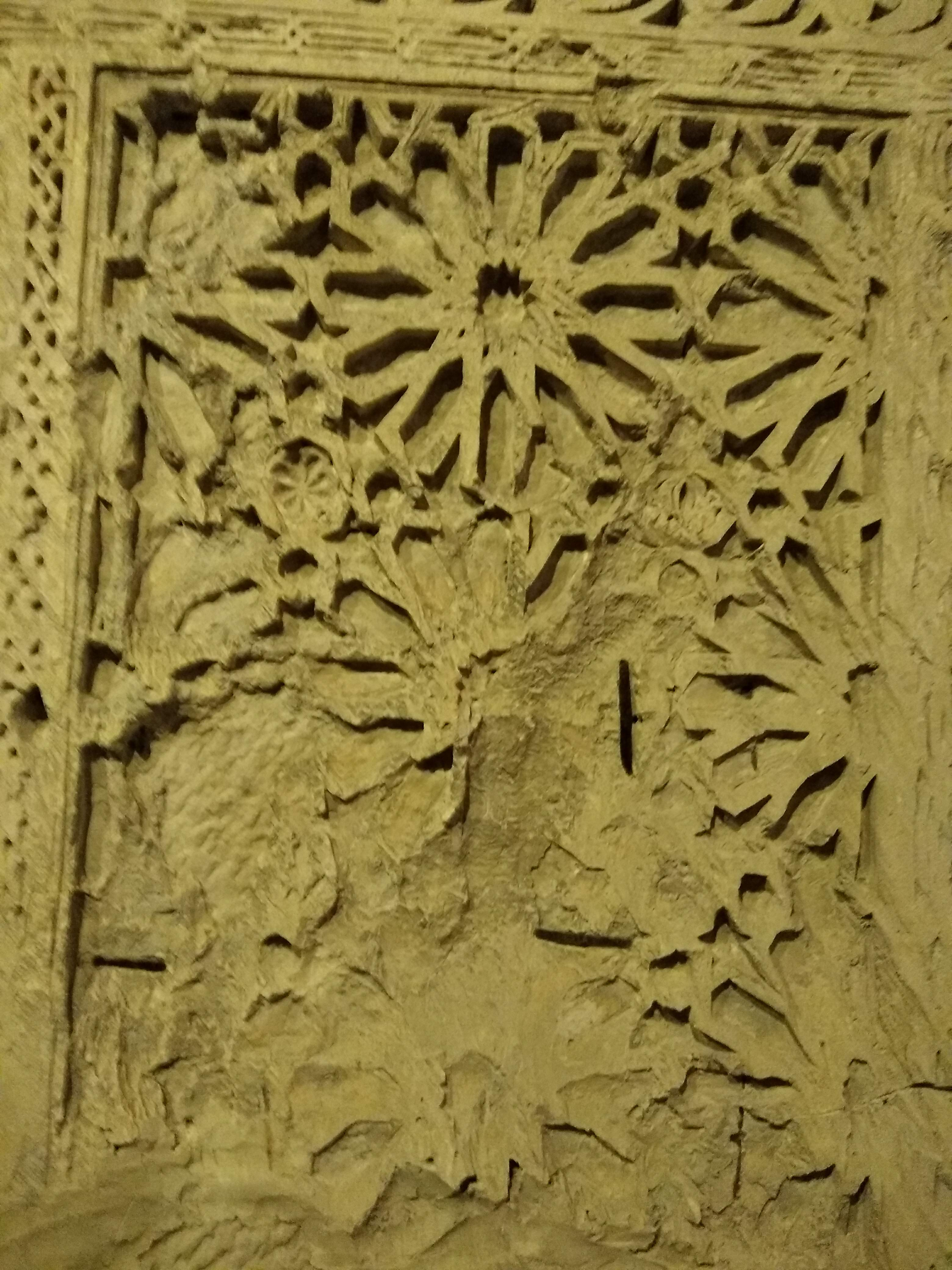
Panel 7

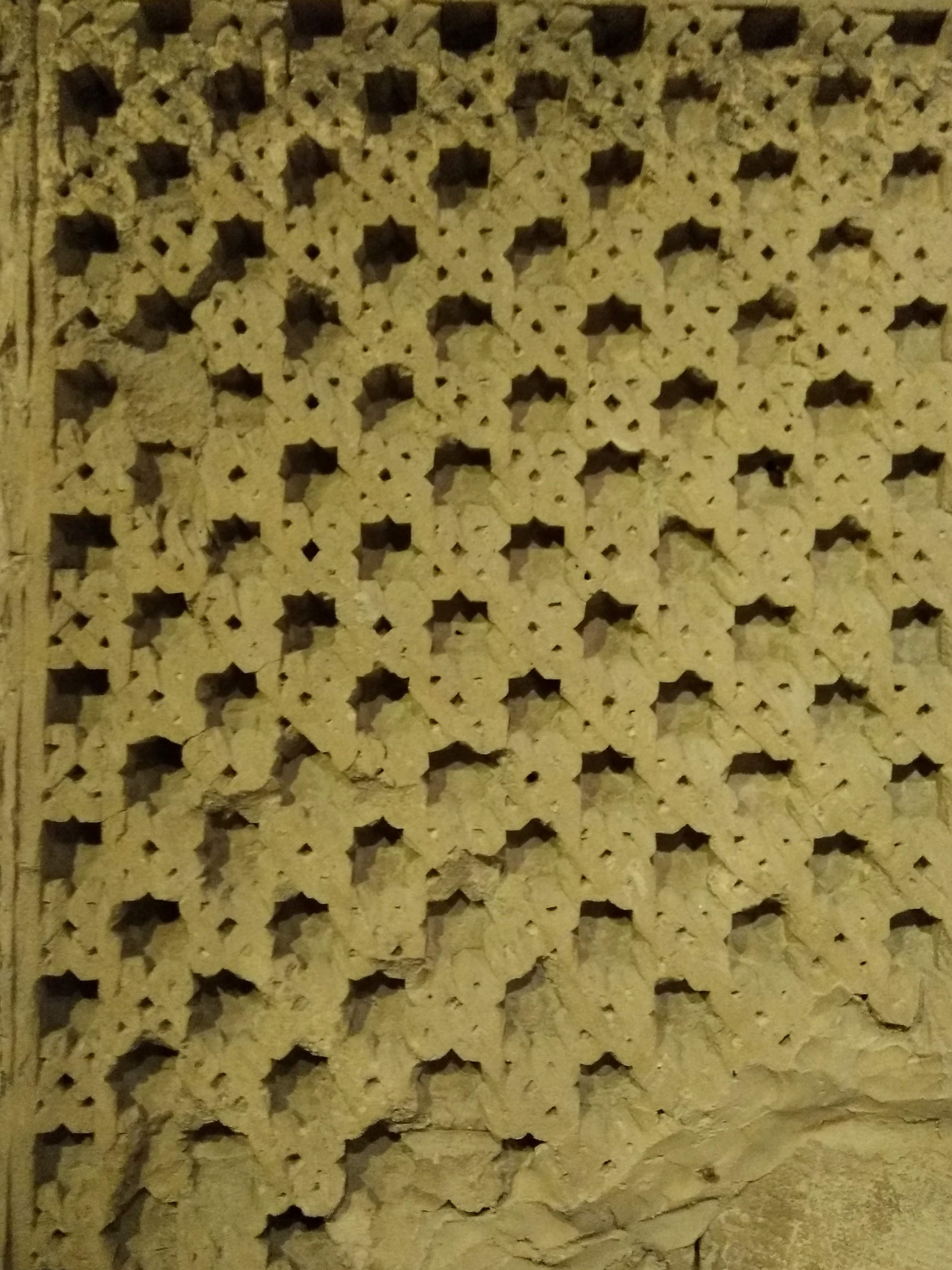
Panel 8

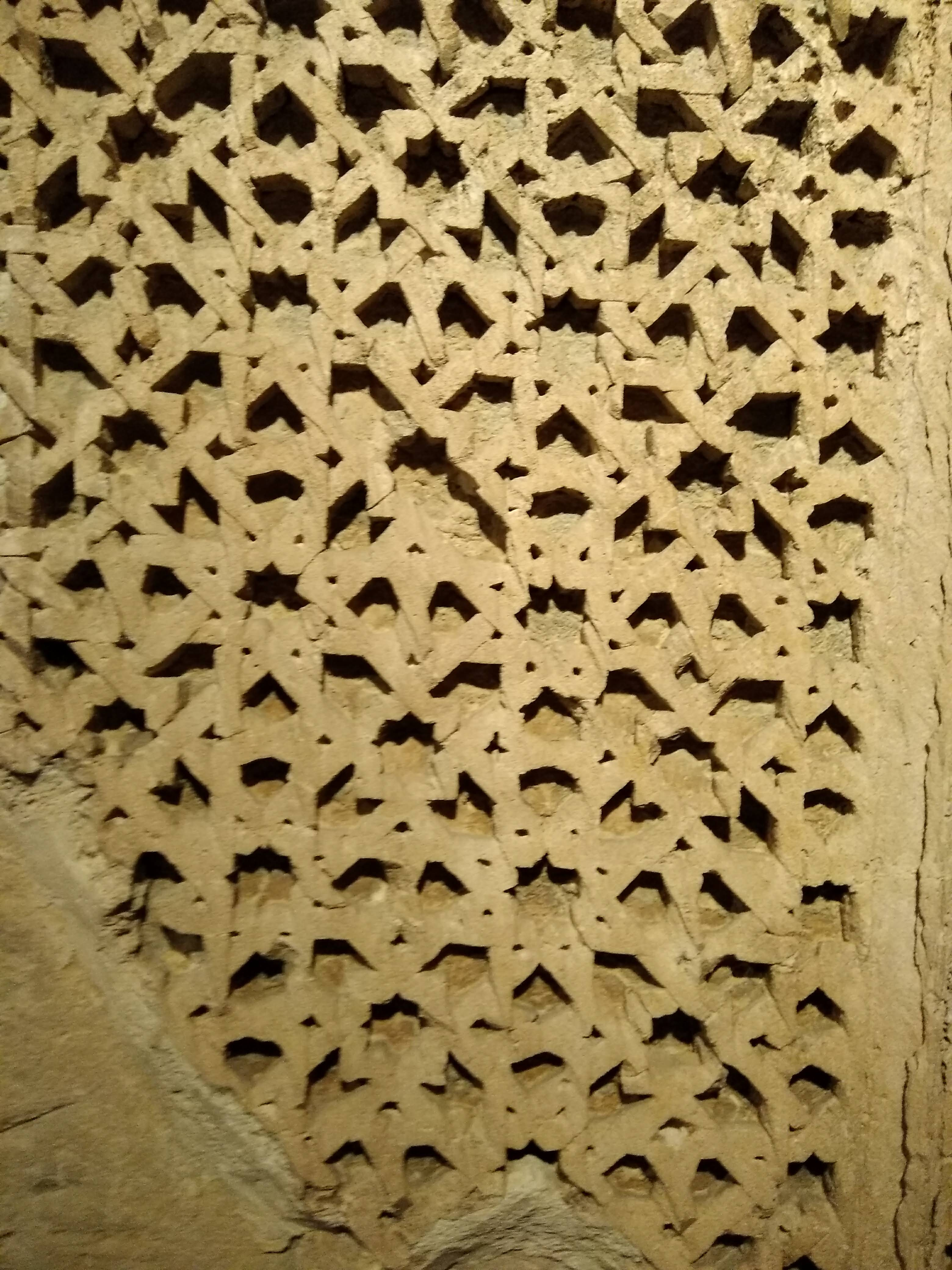
Panel 9

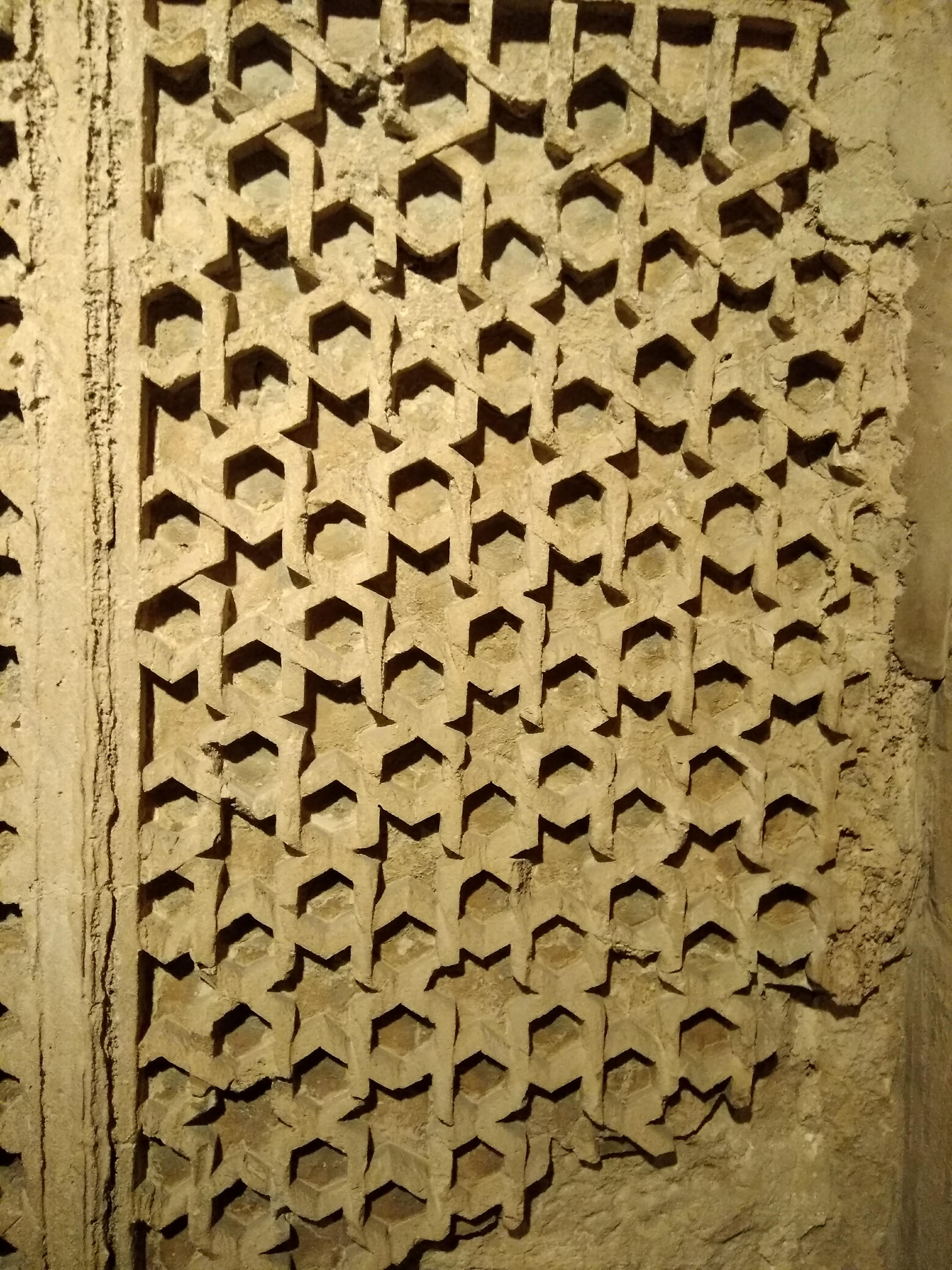
Panel 10

==== Galería del Rey or Galería Dorada ====
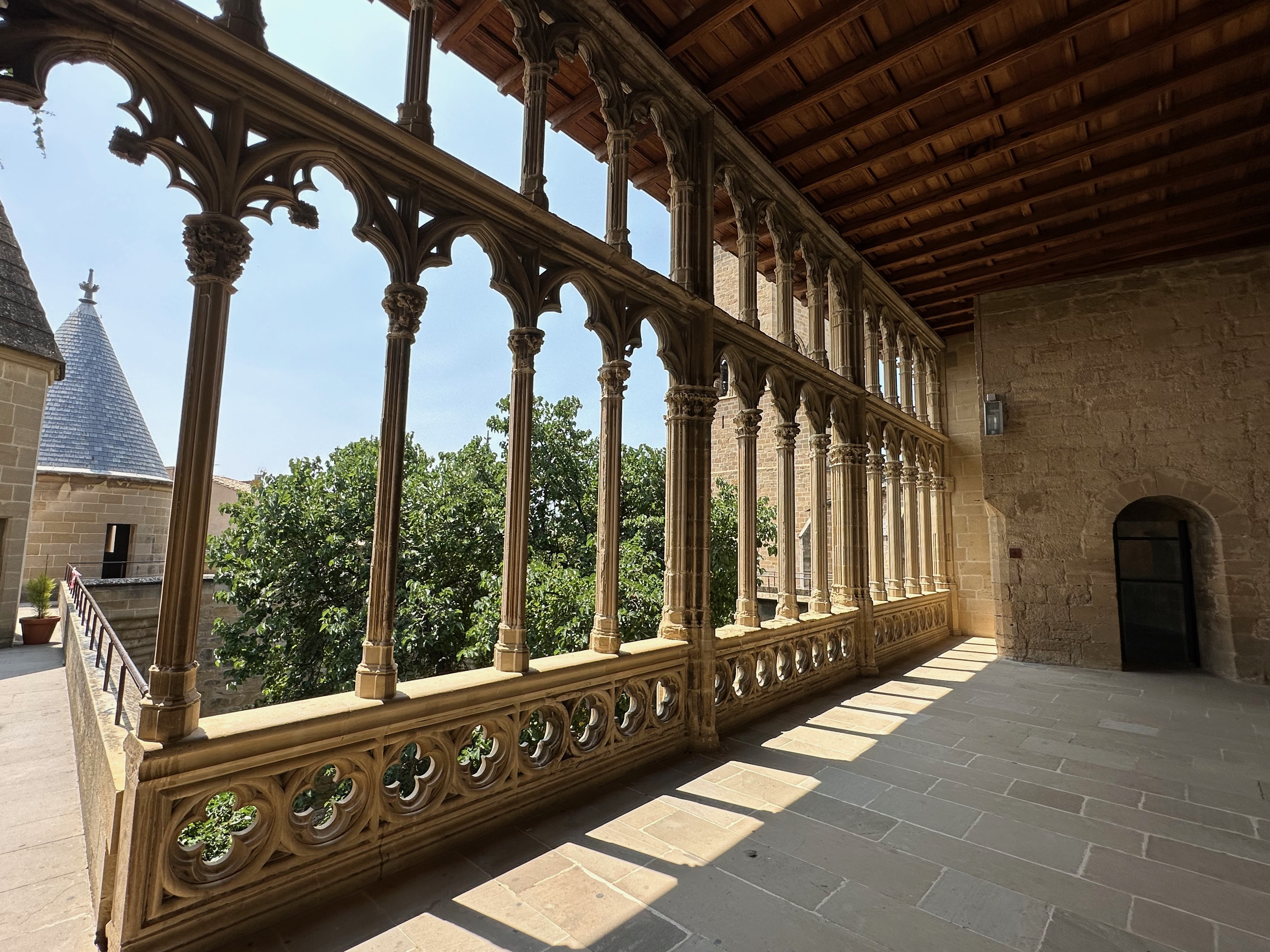
Gallery's King, Royal Palace of Olite

(Gallery's King or Golden gallery), is a gallery next to the King's chamber that overlooks the courtyard known as Patio de las Moreras. Composed of a wing with arches of Gothic tracery. These are two superimposed Gothic arches, the lower higher than the top. Divided into three vertical sections separated by diamond pillars, two of the ends formed of five arches while the center is formed only four.

==== Galería de la Reina ====
(Queen's gallery) Located next to the Queen's chamber, it is a small garden for the exclusive use of the Queen. It lies within the feature known as hanging gardens since it is located several meters high. For the construction of these gardens a room known as the Arches had to be built to support the gallery. The gallery was entirely rebuilt as a cloister in the 20th century and is formed by high arches with Gothic tracery small ornaments at the top. This garden is one of the places sheltered from the wind, so it was the ideal place to build the Queen's garden.

==== Torre de Fenero ====
(Fenero's tower) Controlled the passage through the City gate of Fenero, so called because through this opened door in the walls came hay carts. It is a simple vain formed by a pointed arch without any decoration.

==== Torre de la Atalaya, del Vigía or de la Joyosa Guarda ====
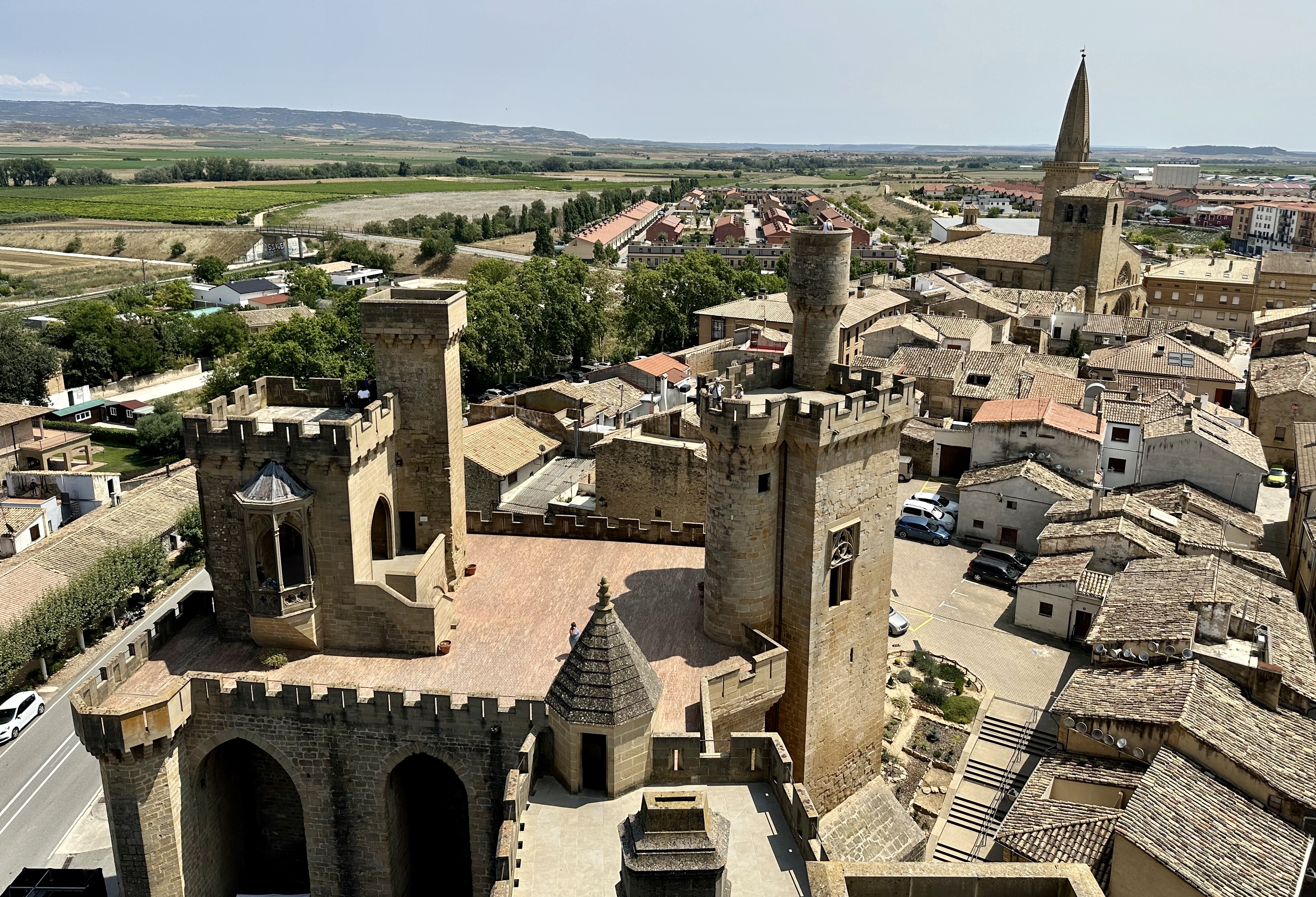
Torre del Vigía and torre de los Cuatro Vientos

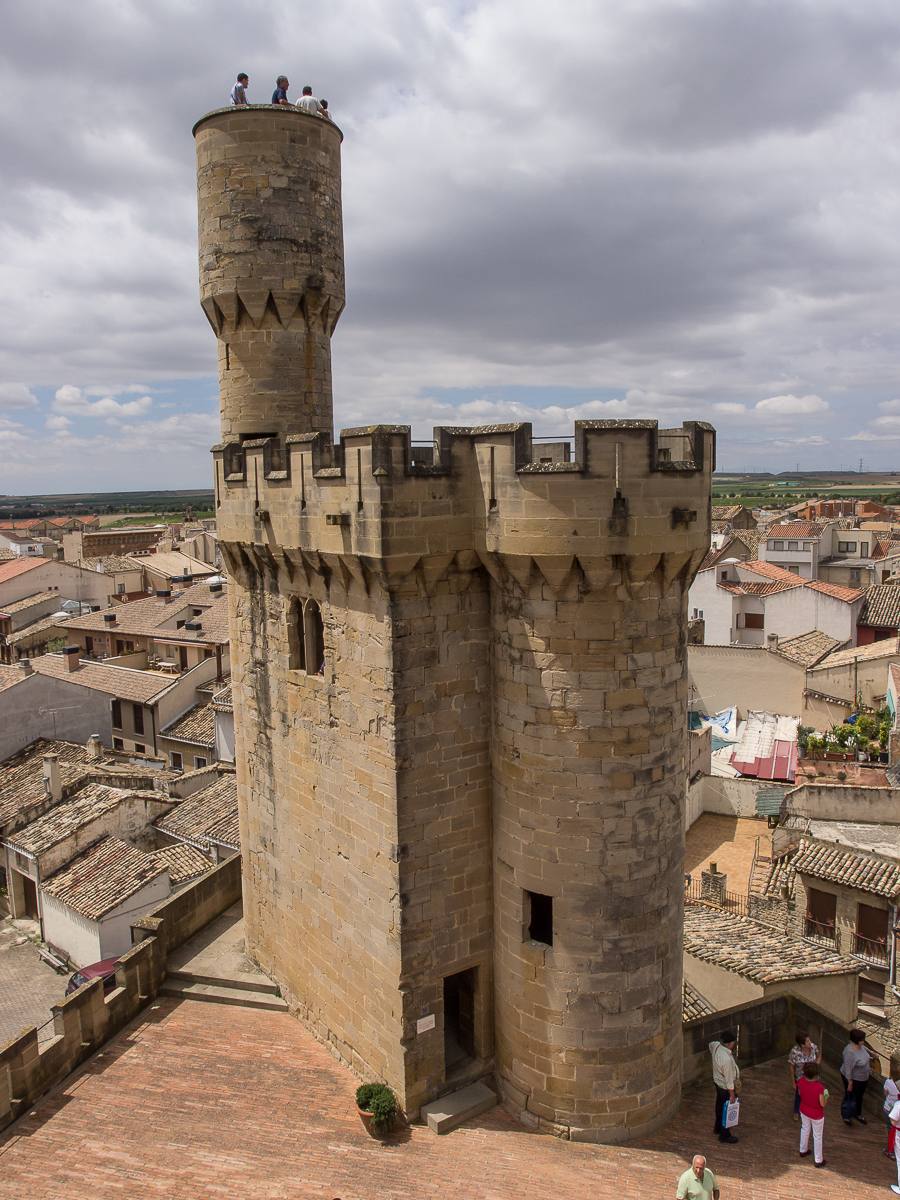
Torre de la Atalaya

So named because since it was a watchman notice of any incident that might occur in the vicinity. It is a square tower on whose crenellated terrace rises other smaller circular towers. There were located the watchman; it is so small that there is only space for one man. Adjoining the tower can be found a smaller one. In this tower stands a window lintel with original Gothic tracery, and symbols to represent the eternal bond, one of the emblems of Charles III the Noble.

==== Torre de los cuatro vientos o de las Tres Grandes Finestras ====
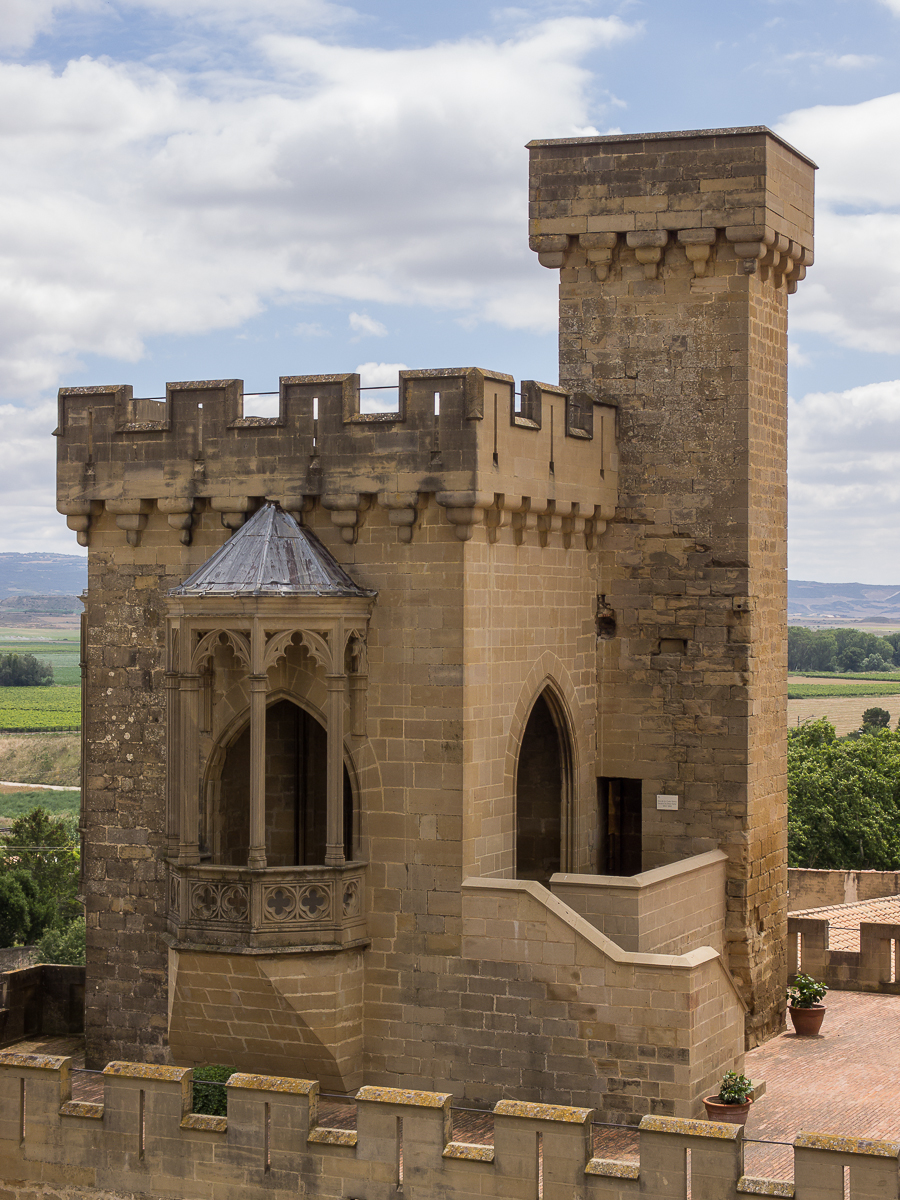
Torre de los Cuatro Vientos

(The Four Winds's tower or the Big Three Finestras's tower) So named because of its square structure looming three balconies, each facing a cardinal point. From these balconies the kings could watch the shows that were held at the foot of the castle. Adjoining the tower is a small tower with a square base and higher. Both towers located very close to each other, are in the most remote area of the castle, on its south side. In this place could be found another garden, the Jardín del Cenador, that today has disappeared.

==== Torre del Aljibe ====
(Cistern's tower) The sole purpose of this tower was to store water from the nearby Cidacos river was brought to supply the palace. Hollow on the inside, from here water to the palace and the royal gardens was provided. The distribution was carried through lead pipes that were embedded in the palace's walls. Water gardens was made by copper buckets. This complex irrigation system was conducted by Juan D'Espernou. At the foot of this tower was a deep moat (the liony), so named because it was the place where the King kept his dangerous beasts.

==== Torre de las Tres Coronas or Ochavada ====
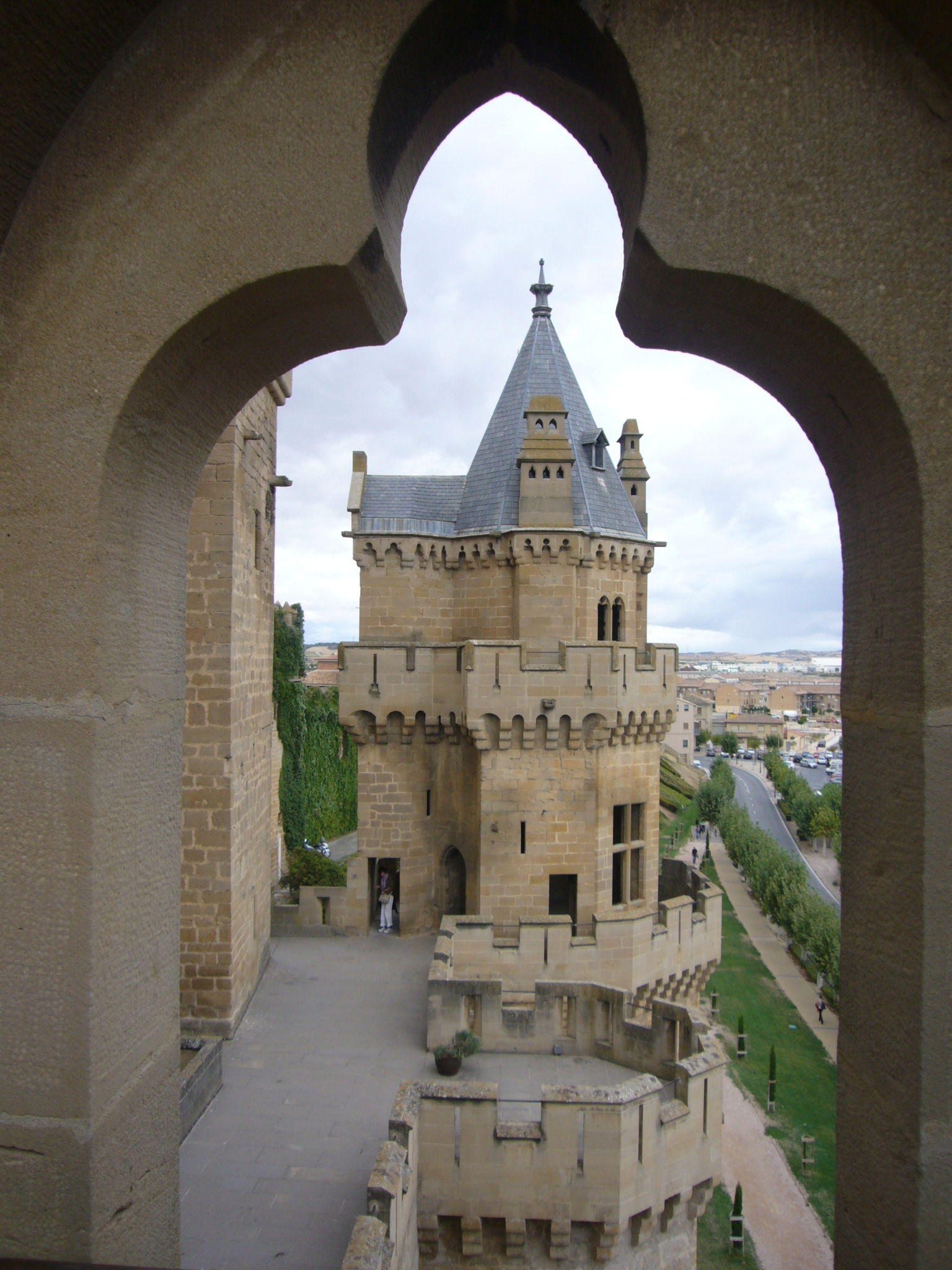
Torre de las Tres Coronas' back side

(The Three Crowns' tower or Octagonal tower) So named for its peculiar shape arranged in three heights, in descending order and octagonal. Its top could be used for raising pigeons.

From this place can see the Pozo de hielo (the ice well). The well is dug 8 meters deep in the floor. An eggshell-shaped cover protected the ice during the rest of the year. This well was made in 17th century, so it was added after the castle's construction. The conservation technique of the ice that was well known, made by layers of ice's separated by layers of straw. Since the well was located in a cold place, ice could be kept until the end of summer. The ice was often used for both culinary and pharmaceutical purposes.

==== Capilla de San Jorge ====
(St. George's chapel) From the Torre de las Tres Coronas, can be seen the remains of the chapel of St. George. This was the kings' private chapel. Built in the late-14th century it was started by Queen Eleanor of Castile. Of this rectangular building only the outer walls remain. On top of the chapel rose a second floor for the Queen's stay, but the poor quality of construction, as it was done in masonry, has meant that it has not survived today. Under the chapel is a vaulted space, which is an old wine cellar. The winery is closed by a barrel vault and has niches in the walls.

==== Patio de la Morera ====
(Morera's courtyard) is a square space in whose center stands a white mulberry tree, which according to a tradition was planted by King Charles III himself. Because of its age it is declared a Natural Monument of Navarre.

==== Patio de la Pajarera ====
(Aviary's courtyard) is a reserved space for birds that inhabited the castle. Located in an inner courtyard, it was only uncovered at the top, which was closed by a net that prevented the birds from escaping. From Galería del Rey this courtyard can be completely observed. Highlights include a space built in plaster that served as a nesting place for birds and is still preserved in fairly good condition.

== Daily life ==
Feasts, tournaments and bullfights were held at the palace. Among the celebrations should be recalled the jousting or tournaments held in 1439 during the days that lasted the celebrations of the Prince of Viana and German Princess Agnes of Cleves's wedding.

Bullfights were also performed, as well in 1387 King Charles II of Navarre "the Bad" organized a bullfight in which performed three Muslim as toreros.

The Basque pelota was an important part in this palace's life. A document of 1408 refers to a terrace for playing ball at the palace.

Also in this palace was held the wedding of John I, Count of Foix, and Joan, Heiress of Navarre.

In the late-19th century Gustavo Adolfo Bécquer passed through the castle, and in view of the ruined castle he made the work "The Royal Castle of Olite (Notes of a journey to Navarre)". In his tour Bécquer gives a romantic and nostalgic view of the castle, with its bare rooms.

== Sources ==
- Mariano Carlos Solano y Gálvez, Marqués de Monsalud "El Palacio Real de Olite", Boletín de la Real Academia de la Historia, 49 (1906), pp. 435-447.
