= Charles III of Navarre =

King of Navarre from 1387 to 1425

Charles III
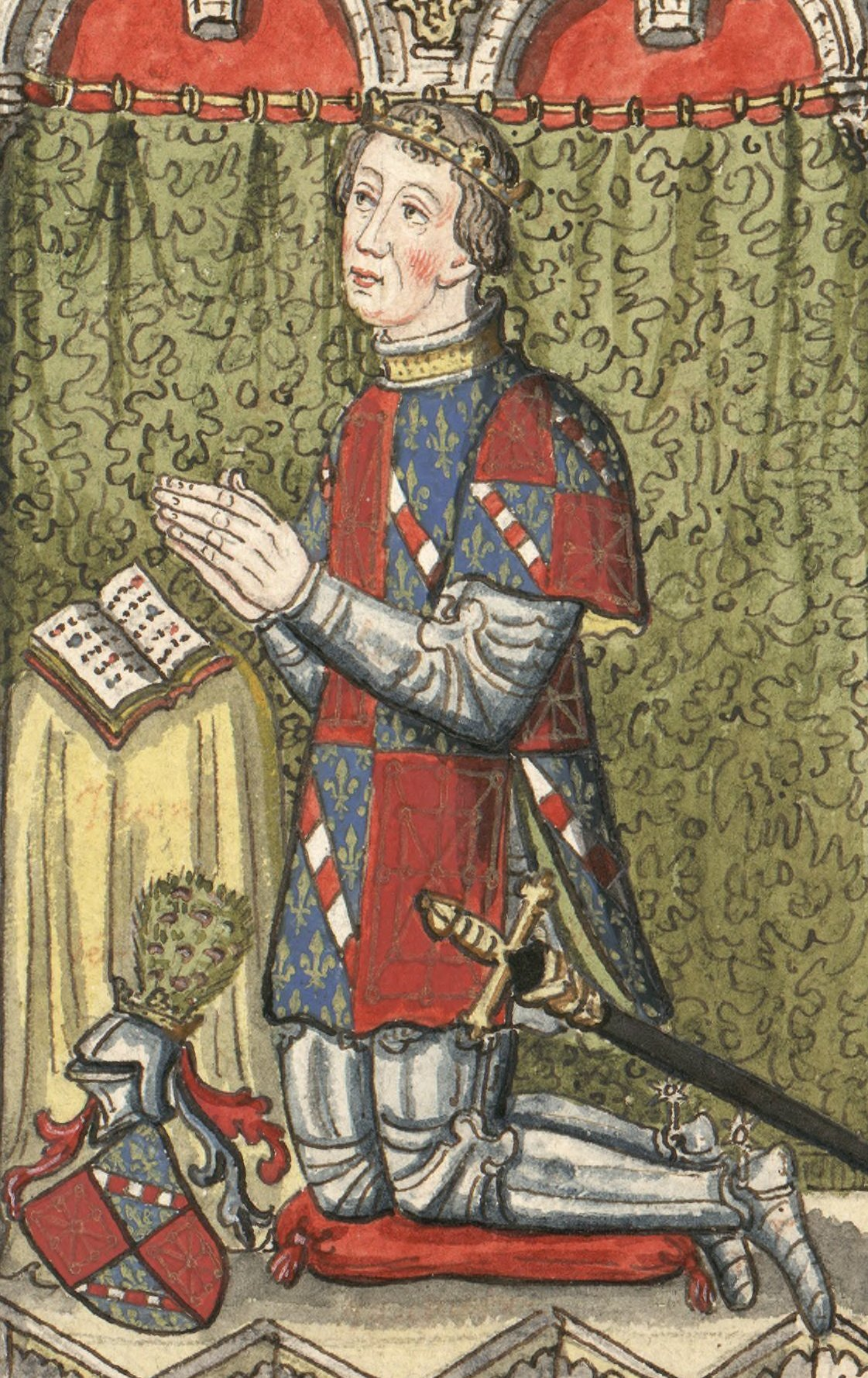
- Reproduction of the stained glass depiction of Charles in the Évreux Cathedral

King of Navarre
- Reign: 1 January 1387 – 8 September 1425
- Predecessor: Charles II
- Successor: Blanche I and John II
- Born: 22 July 1361; Mantes, France
- Died: 8 September 1425 (aged 64); Olite Palace, Navarre
- Burial: Pamplona Cathedral
- Spouse: Eleanor of Castile (m. 1375; died 1416)
- Issue more...: Joan, Countess of Foix; Blanche I, Queen of Navarre; Beatrice, Countess of La Marche; Isabel, Countess of Armagnac; Lancelot, Vicar General of Pamplona; (ill.)
- House: Évreux
- Father: Charles II of Navarre
- Mother: Joan of Valois
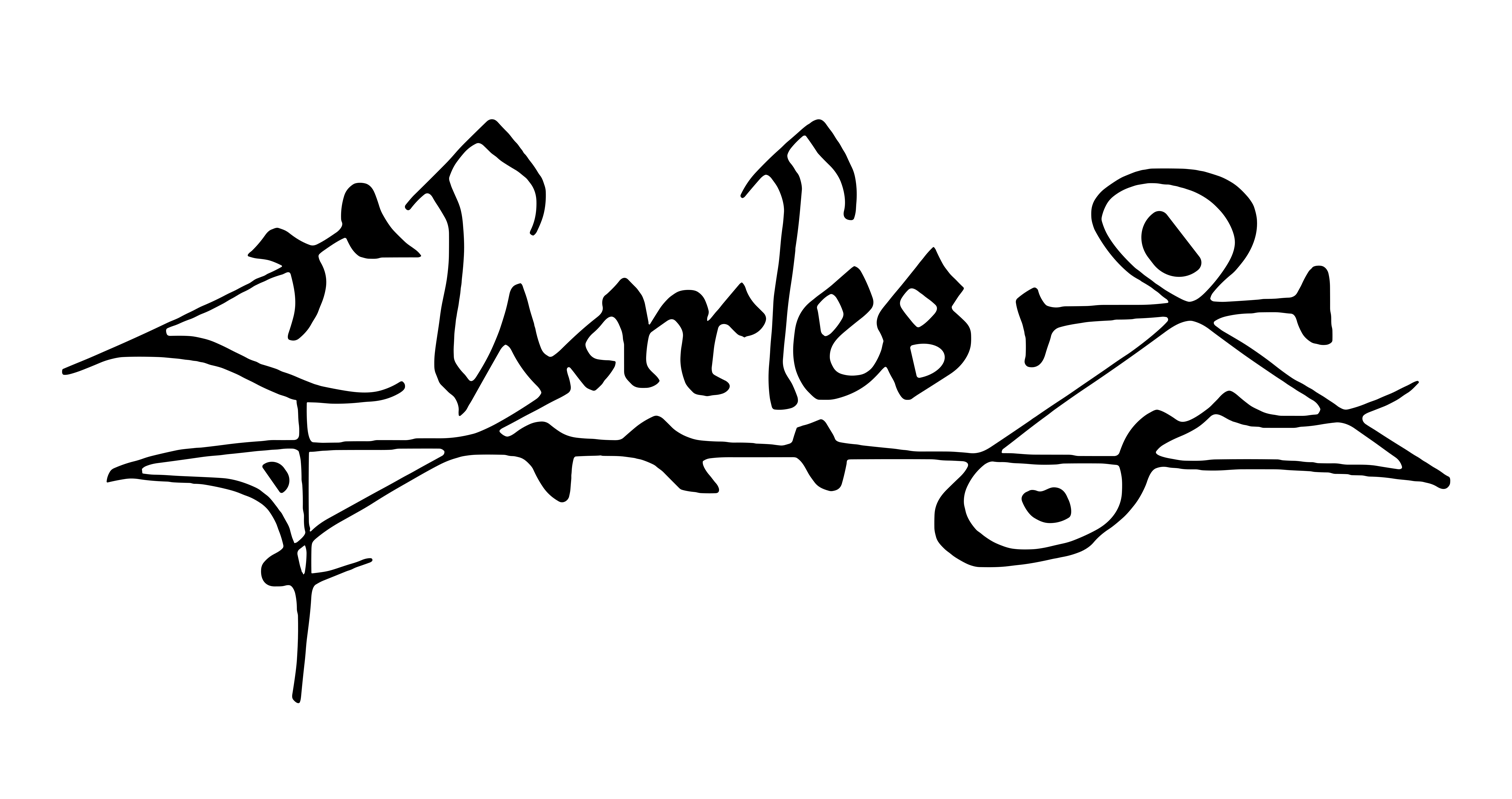
- Signature

Charles III (Basque: Karlos, French: Charles; 22 July 1361 – 8 September 1425), called the Noble, was King of Navarre from 1387 to his death and Count of Évreux in France from 1387 to 1404, when he exchanged Évreux for the Duchy of Nemours.

As a young man, Charles was frequently sent by his father, King Charles II, to act as the envoy to France, where the family had vested interests both as fief holders and princes of the blood royal. Following Charles II's dismal reign, Charles III set out to improve Navarre's infrastructure, restore its pride, and mend strained relations with France. While he may have seen himself primarily as a French prince, particularly early on, the focus of the Navarrese foreign policy during Charles III's reign gradually shifted towards Navarre's neighbours in the Iberian Peninsula.

Charles's personal life was somewhat turbulent. His marriage to Eleanor of Castile suffered a long crisis early in his reign over the status of their daughters and his illegitimate children; the couple reconciled after Charles affirmed their daughters' exclusive right to succeed him. Charles skillfully secured a balanced web of alliances through the marriages of his sisters and daughters to French lords and Iberian princes, ensuring a long-lasting peace in Navarre. He strove to increase the royal prestige through art patronage, court extravagance, and construction works. Having outlived most of his children, he was succeeded by his third daughter, Blanche I.

== Background and childhood ==
A member of the House of Évreux, a cadet branch of the French royal House of Capet, Charles III was the firstborn son of King Charles II of Navarre and the French princess Joan of Valois. He was born at Mantes, the heart of his father's patrimonial lands in northern France, on 22 July 1361. His parents were there on one of their long stays, managing the County of Évreux and other fiefs during the first phase (1337–1360) of France's Hundred Years' War against England. Since 1234, the Kingdom of Navarre had been ruled by monarchs of French extraction, who reformed the kingdom's administration, increased its international prestige, and strengthened the position of the monarchy, but also caused concern among their Iberian subjects by their long absences from the kingdom in favor of their possessions in France.

King Charles II returned to Navarre in November 1361, leaving his wife and son behind in France. When in January 1363 it was her turn to move to Navarre, Queen Joan left Charles in the custody of his aunt Blanche, sister of his father and widow of his maternal great-grandfather King Philip VI of France. Charles was reunited with his mother when she returned to France in December 1365, and the following August Charles set foot in his father's kingdom for the first time.

Map of France in 1350. The possessions of the king of Navarre are painted yellow.

Charles's parents repeatedly went back and forth between the family's French fiefs and Iberian kingdom; during his father's absence in 1369, Charles was already titled lieutenant of the kingdom despite his young age. Navarre paid a high price in King Charles II's conflict with Kings John II and Charles V of France, his father-in-law and brother-in-law respectively, over his ancestral claim to the County of Champagne and even the Kingdom of France, as well as over Queen Joan's dowry. The suffering of the populace was exacerbated by problems common throughout Europe at that time, from worsening climate to disease and food shortages. Queen Joan died suddenly on a diplomatic mission to her brother the French king in November 1373.

== Marriage ==
On 27 May 1375, in the Castilian town of Soria, Charles married Eleanor, daughter of King Henry II of Castile, sealing the peace between their fathers. Both Charles and Eleanor were in their early teen years at the time of their wedding. She remained in Castile, where Charles visited her when he was not in Navarre or representing his father at the French royal court in Paris.

In 1378, Charles was sent by his father on an embassy to King Charles V of France. The king of France had his nephew arrested and the Évreux possessions in France embargoed, except Cherbourg, which the king of Navarre had leased to the English. During an interrogation, the young Charles revealed his father's plan to seize the Castilian (formerly Navarrese) town of Logroño. The king of France alerted the king of Castile to the plot, and the latter promptly invaded Navarre and forced its king to sign the Treaty of Briones. Eleanor played a key role in securing Charles's release in 1381 by having her brother King John I of Castile exert diplomatic pressure on France. Upon his release, Charles joined Eleanor in Castile.

Charles and Eleanor's first child, a daughter named Joan, was born in Castile in November 1382. Two more daughters were born to the young couple in Castile: Marie, in 1383 or 1384, and Blanche, in August 1385. Twin daughters were born to the couple the following year, but only one, named Beatrice, survived infancy.

== Reign ==
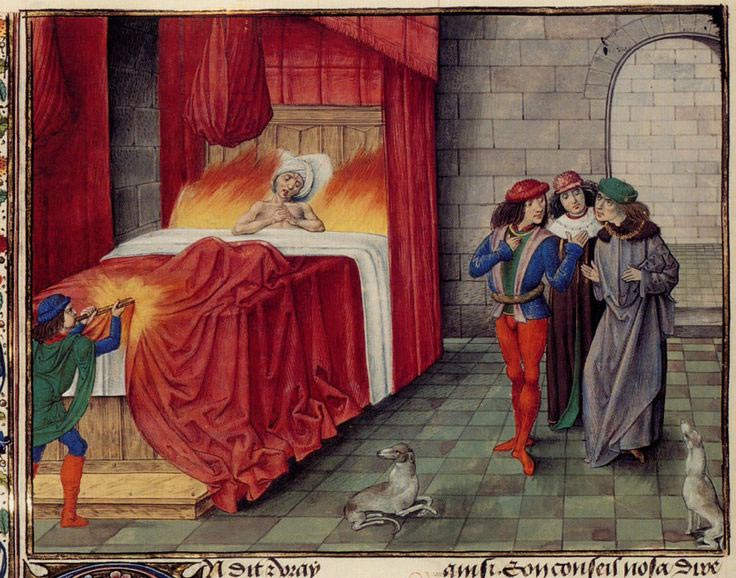
The death of Charles II

Charles III became king of Navarre and count of Évreux upon the death of his father on 1 January 1387; the same year he recovered from the Crown of Castile the last Castilian-occupied parts of Navarre.

=== Marital problems ===
The early years of Charles III's reign were marred by the breakdown of his relationship with his wife, Eleanor. She and their daughters joined him in Navarre upon his accession, but the new queen soon fell gravely ill. She returned to Castile as soon as her health began to improve and took the princesses with her. Her refusal to return for the next seven years, despite embassies sent by Charles, damaged the relations between her husband and her brother King John I of Castile. When the latter became exasperated by her abandonment of her "great obligations", she claimed that Charles failed to receive her and treat her as befit her. According to a chronicle of John's reign, she even accused Charles of pressuring her to take herbs from a Jewish physician in an attempt to poison her. Historian Elena Woodacre posits that the rift between Charles and Eleanor was caused by his illegitimate children. When she arrived in Navarre, Eleanor found Charles's four mistresses and six illegitimate children living with their retainers at the court. The queen was likely worried that her daughters' rights to succeed their father would be threatened by his illegitimate infant son, Lancelot, despite illegitimate children being barred from succession by the Fueros.

Still estranged from Eleanor, Charles underwent coronation alone in 1390. From that year on, Charles made a series of moves to repair his marriage, the first of which was to assure Eleanor that he intended to be succeeded by the issue of their marriage. He summoned their eldest daughter, Joan, to Navarre to be sworn in as heir presumptive to the throne. The ceremony, attended by the nobility of Navarre and Castilian envoys, was held on 25 July. Eleanor did not find this sufficient, but the death of her brother John and the accession of her nephew King Henry III of Castile, who was less sympathetic to her cause, forced her to compromise. She demanded further assurances of her safety, and Charles accordingly swore on the Christian cross before Castilian representatives that he "would not kill nor maim nor seize nor allow her to be killed or maimed or seized" and that he "would protect the life and health of the said queen with all of his power" and "otherwise treat [her] in all things as a good husband should treat his wife". Eleanor then returned to Navarre, reuniting with Charles in November 1394 in Tudela.

Soon after their reconciliation, Charles and Eleanor had another daughter, Isabel, born in July 1396. The following September, Charles affirmed the succession rights of all five of their daughters. The birth of long-awaited sons, Charles in June 1397 and Louis in 1402, was a triumph for the king and queen. The young Charles was confirmed as heir apparent to the throne, but both he and Louis died in 1402. The royal couple had another daughter, Margaret, the next year, and Charles held on to the hope that he would have a son with Eleanor until at least 1412. The king and queen appear to have had no disputes after Eleanor's coronation in 1403, and Charles entrusted her with regency of the kingdom while he visited his French fiefs.

=== Diplomacy ===
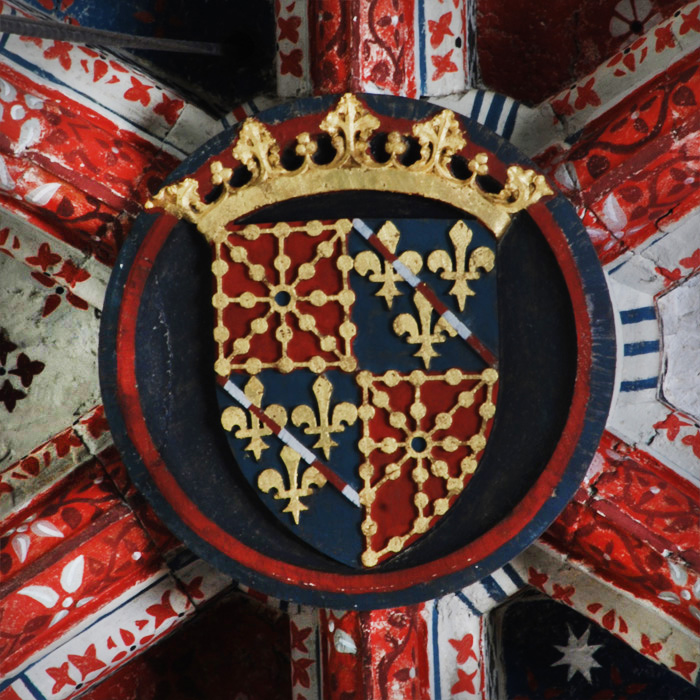
Charles III's personal coat of arms in the Cathedral of Pamplona emphasizes both his Navarrese kingship and his male-line descent from the kings of France.

In 1393, Charles procured a link to the Aragonese royal house by arranging for his sister Marie to marry Duke Alfonso II of Gandia. The same year, he secured the return of Cherbourg from the English and started negotiations with the French court about the settlement of his claims on land in France, which resulted in the exchange of the counties inherited by his father for various rents and the Duchy of Nemours. Charles III took an active part in European affairs as a prince of the blood of the royal house of France until 1406, after which he reoriented himself towards the Iberian Peninsula.

Charles excelled in diplomacy: much of the peace and prosperity Navarre enjoyed during his reign can be attributed to the matrimonial alliances he forged with his nobles and rulers in Iberia and southern France through his numerous female relatives. Between 1396 and 1406, he carefully arranged the marriages of two of his sisters and three of his legitimate daughters, who were his strongest assets in dynastic diplomacy. His illegitimate children, meanwhile, were married off into the Navarrese nobility to ensure their loyalty. Charles greatly profited even from the unions he did not orchestrate, such as his sister Joan's successive marriages to Duke John IV of Brittany and King Henry IV of England. When Joan became queen of England in 1402, Charles gifted her with a copy of the manuscript Ceremonial of the Coronation, Anointment and Obsequies of the Kings of England.

=== Succession plans ===
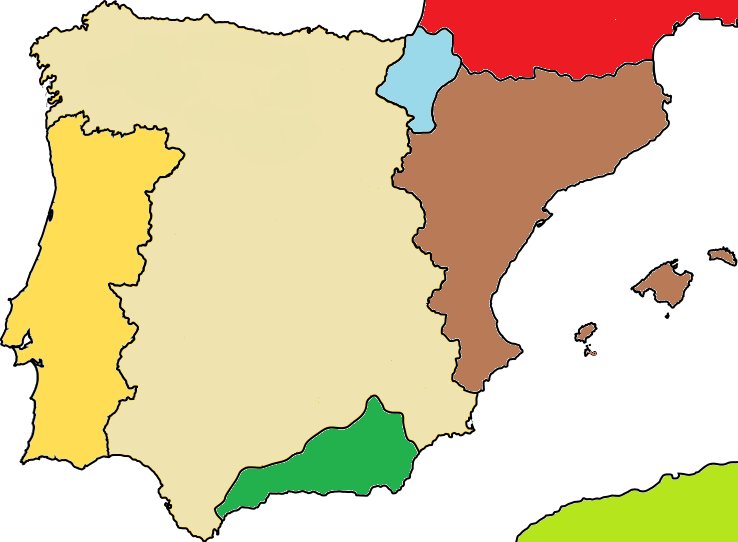
Iberian states in the 15th century: Navarre (blue) is bordered by France to the north, Castile to the west, and Aragon to the east

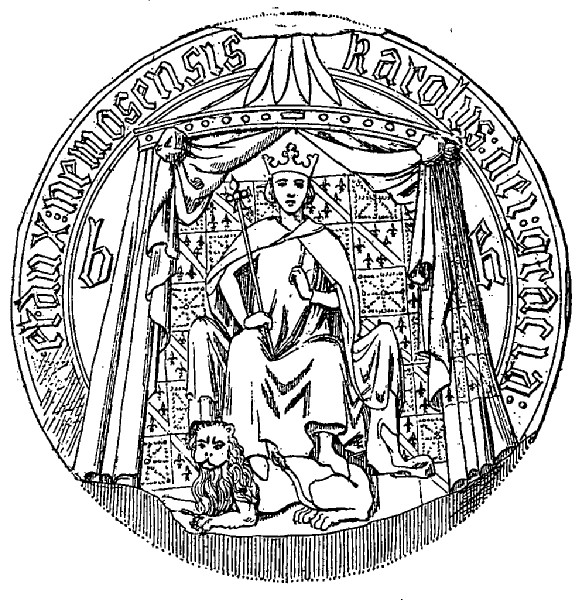
Charles III's seal

From 1401 to 1402, Charles conducted marriage negotiations with King Martin of Aragon, whose only son, King Martin I of Sicily, had been recently widowed. Charles was flattered by the king of Aragon's interest, for Martin had earlier rejected Queen Joan II of Naples as well as the daughters of Kings Rupert of Germany, Charles VI of France, and Henry IV of England. The selection of the third daughter, Blanche, ahead of her older sisters suggests that either Martin or Charles, or both, were not keen on creating a personal union between their kingdoms. Charles concurrently negotiated the marriage of Joan, his eldest daughter, with John, heir apparent to the County of Foix; the king may have preferred that Navarre be the primary partner in any potential union. Joan's marriage to John was celebrated in October 1402, some months after the deaths of her brothers made her once again first in the line of succession. These two marriages, as well as that of Beatrice, the fourth daughter, to Count James II of La Marche in 1406, put a strain on Charles's coffers, and his struggle to pay their dowries led to disputes with their respective in-laws, particularly the king of Aragon. 1406 also saw the death of Charles and Eleanor's second daughter, Marie.

Charles entrusted the kingdom to Eleanor and their daughter Joan from 1408 to 1411, when he was seeking compensation from the French royal court for lost territories. When Blanche was widowed in 1409, Charles used his new connections at the French court to negotiate for her to marry the French king's brother-in-law Louis of Bavaria or Edward of Bar. The death of his childless eldest daughter, Joan, in July 1413 prompted Charles to seek a closer match for Blanche, who became the new heir presumptive. To support his monarchy and manage the royal household, he appointed Lord Juan Vélaz de Medrano as his royal Chamberlain in 1414.

Blanche's situation in Sicily was precarious after the deaths of her husband and father-in-law left her in charge of the unstable island kingdom in the name of the new king, Ferdinand I of Aragon, but without proper support from Aragon. Deeply concerned, Charles sent envoys to both Ferdinand and the Holy See asking that she either be returned to Navarre or provided with assistance. Blanche returned and was confirmed as heir presumptive before the Cortes. Charles refused Joan's widower's proposal to marry Blanche and instead in mid-1414 offered her in marriage to Alfonso, the eldest son of the new king of Aragon. Since Alfonso was already betrothed, Ferdinand suggested his third son, Henry. Charles indignantly refused the offer in August when Ferdinand's second son, John, broke off his engagement to Charles's younger daughter Isabel. Isabel was married off instead to Count John IV of Armagnac, signaling Charles's shift in allegiance from the Burgundians to the Armagnac party during the on-going civil war in France. The change may have been prompted by Burgundy's alliance with England, where Charles's sister Joan was imprisoned on a charge of witchcraft after the death of her second husband, King Henry IV.

In 1416, following the examples of the kings of France, Castile, Aragon, and Portugal in dealing with the Western Schism, Charles III stopped recognizing the Avignon-based Benedict XIII as the true pope and switched his allegiance to Gregory XII, who ruled in Rome. Eleanor died the same year.

The Aragonese remained determined to secure Blanche's marriage for themselves. Their queen, Eleanor of Alburquerque, pushed for her second son, John, to marry Blanche. Their marriage was celebrated in October 1419, after months of intensive negotiations during which the princess's position was reaffirmed. Charles promised not to remarry to sire sons who could displace Blanche. When Blanche gave birth to a son, Charles, the king celebrated by creating for him the Principality of Viana. Blanche soon had a daughter too, named Joan. King Charles held formal ceremonies marking the introduction of both grandchildren into the line of succession after Blanche.

=== Last years ===
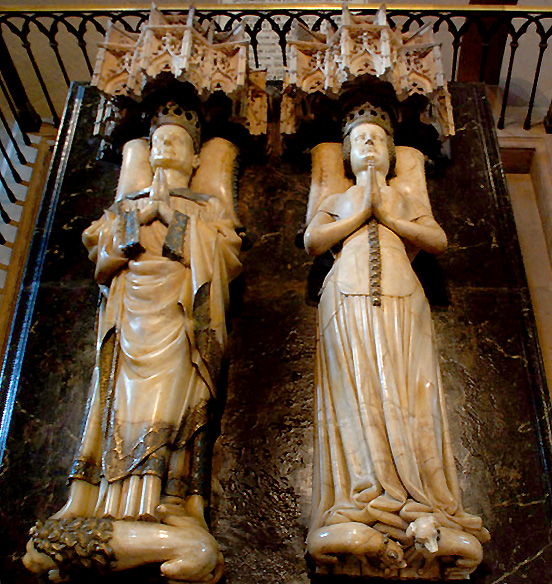
Tomb of King Charles and Queen Eleanor in the Cathedral of Pamplona

Charles made great effort to exalt the monarchy through art patronage, extraordinary donations, and thaumaturgy. The construction of the Gothic Cathedral of Pamplona and of the royal palaces in Olite and Tafalla was finished at his instruction. In 1423, he ended the centuries of conflict between the city's three boroughs by uniting them into one.

On 8 September 1425, having woken up healthy and cheerful, Charles III suddenly collapsed. He was able to call for Blanche, but lost the ability to speak by the time she arrived. He died in his daughter's arms the same day. Blanche succeeded him without trouble. Charles was buried in the Cathedral of Pamplona by the side of his wife, Eleanor.

== Legacy ==
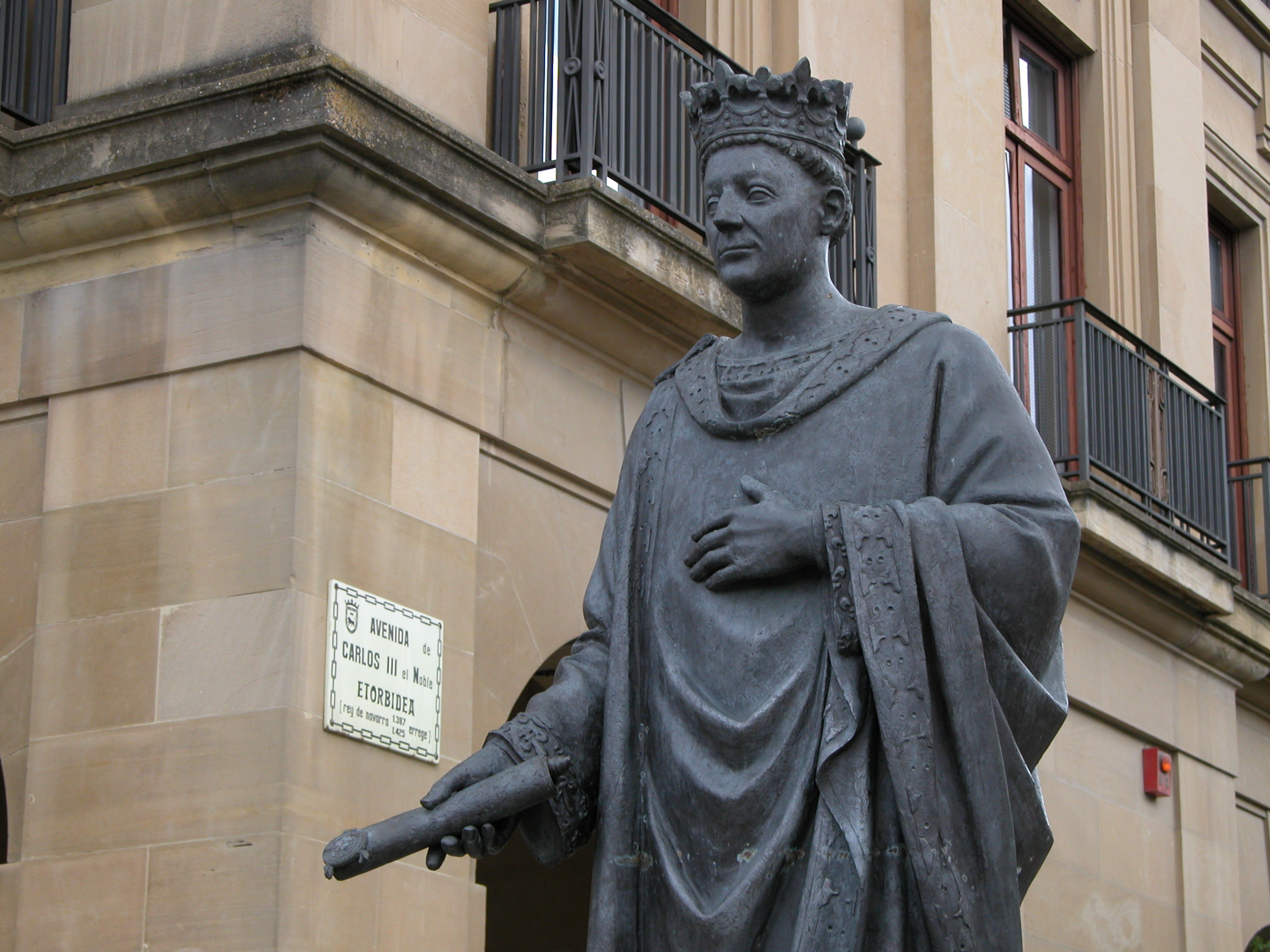
Statue of King Charles III in Pamplona, Spain

Charles III left to his daughter a stable and prosperous realm. Whether he saw himself primarily as a French prince or an Iberian king remains debated by historians, but it is clear that he oversaw a steadily increasing Iberianization of Navarre. Traditional historiography portrays Charles III's reign as a time of internal withdrawal, as opposed to his father's active part in the Hundred Years' War; finance reforms, which restored a measure of prosperity and social contentment to the kingdom after Charles II's turbulent reign; and courtly splendor. Charles III also demonstrated a significant aptitude for diplomacy. In contrast to his father, Charles "the Bad", Charles III therefore earned the cognomen "the Noble".

== Issue ==
Charles had seven daughters and two sons with his wife, Eleanor of Castile:

- Joan (1382–1413), who was his heir presumptive and married to John I of Foix
- Maria (1383 or 1384–1406), who was gravely ill along with Eleanor in the immediate aftermath of Charles's accession and remained in poor health throughout her life
- Blanche (1385–1441), Charles's ultimate successor, who was married successively to Kings Martin I of Sicily and John II of Aragon
- Beatrice (1392–1412), married to Count James II of La Marche
- Daughter, twin sister of Beatrice, who died young
- Isabel (1395–1435), married in 1419 to Count John IV of Armagnac
- Charles (1397–1402), who was heir apparent to the throne of Navarre during his short life
- Louis (1402), who died within months of his birth
- Margaret (1403), who died young

Additionally, Charles had several illegitimate children, including:

- Lancelot (by Maria Miguel de Esparza), who had a church career
- Godfrey, who married Teresa Ramírez de Arellano
- Joan, who married Louis de Beaumont, 1st Count of Lerín
- another Joan, who married Iñigo Ortiz de Zúñiga

== Sources ==
- Castro Alava, José Ramón (1967). Carlos III el Noble: rey de Navarra. Institución Príncipe de Viana, Diputación Foral de Navarra.
- García Arancón, Raquel (2014). Sarasa Sánchez, Esteban (ed.). La monarquía navarra, 1234-1512. Monarquía, crónicas, archivos y cancillerías en los reinos hispano-cristianos: siglos XIII-XV. University of Navarra. pp. 325–346. ISBN 978-84-9911-307-4.
- Herreros Lopetegui, Susana (1993). Navarra en la órbita francesa. Historia Ilustrada de Navarra. Pamplona: Diario de Navarra.
- Ramírez Vaquero, Eloísa (2007). Carlos III, rey de Navarra: príncipe de sangre Valois (1387-1425). Trea. ISBN 978-8497043052.
- Woodacre, Elena (2013). The Queens Regnant of Navarre: Succession, Politics, and Partnership, 1274-1512. Palgrave Macmillan.
- Narbona Cárceles, María (2014). Leonor de Trastámara: (1360-1415) esposa de Carlos III el Noble. Reinas de Navarra. pp. 645–680. ISBN 978-84-7737-840-2.

Charles III of Navarre House of Évreux Cadet branch of the Capetian dynasty Born: 1361 Died: 8 September 1425
Regnal titles
Preceded by Charles II	King of Navarre; 1387–1425	Succeeded by Blanche I John II
Vacant Forfeited to France Title last held by Charles II of Navarre	Count of Évreux; 1387–1404	Vacant French royal domain Title next held by John Stewart
New creation	Duke of Nemours; 1404–1425	Vacant Seized by England Title next held by Blanche
