= Joan of Navarre (regent) =

Regent and heiress presumptive of Navarre

Countess consort of Foix
- Tenure: 22 February 1412 - July 1413
- Born: 1382
- Died: July 1413 (aged 30–31); Béarn
- Spouse: John I, Count of Foix
- House: Évreux
- Father: Charles III of Navarre
- Mother: Eleanor of Castile

Joan of Navarre (French: Jeanne, Spanish: Juana; 1382 – July 1413) was the heiress presumptive to the throne of Navarre in 1402–1413, and regent of Navarre in the absence of her father in 1409–1411.

== Life ==
Joan was the eldest child of King Charles III of Navarre and his wife Eleanor, daughter of King Henry II of Castile. Her younger sisters were Blanche, Beatrice, and Isabella.

Joan was originally betrothed in 1401 to Martin I of Sicily, the heir to the throne of Aragón. He was widower of Maria of Sicily, who had not given him surviving children. Plans were however changed and Martin married Joan's sister Blanche. Joan herself married at Olite on 12 November 1402 to John, Viscount of Castellbò, the heir to the County of Foix in France. The couple were married for eleven years but failed to produce any children. A month after her wedding, Joan was recognized as heiress presumptive to the throne of Navarre at Olite on 3 December 1402. There the Estates of Navarre swore an oath to Joan and John as their future sovereigns. This was after the early death of Joan's only brothers, Charles and Louis, in quick succession earlier in the year.

In 1404, Joan contracted smallpox and was treated by the Jewish doctor Abraham Comineto. During her regency she had her own personal salaried doctor, Salomon Gotheynno, also a Jew.

Joan governed Navarre in the name of her father while he was in Paris between 1409 and 1411. In 1412 she became Countess of Foix when her husband succeeded his father in the county. She died in the Principality of Béarn in July 1413, childless. Her younger sister Blanche became heiress presumptive to the throne of Navarre, and succeeded their father Charles III on 8 September 1425.

== Sources ==
- Merriman, Roger Bigelow (1918). The Rise of the Spanish Empire in the Old and in the New. Vol. 1. The Macmillan Company.
- Woodacre, Elena (2013). The Queens Regnant of Navarre: Succession, Politics, and Partnership, 1274-1512. Palgrave Macmillan.

Joan of Navarre House of Évreux Cadet branch of the Capetian dynasty Born: circa 1382 Died: July 1413
French nobility
Vacant Title last held by Joanna of Aragon	Countess consort of Foix; 22 February 1412-July 1413	Vacant Title next held by Jeanne d'Albret
