= John I of Foix =

French noble

John I
- Count of Foix
- Reign: 1412–1436
- Born: 1382
- Died: 4 May 1436 (aged 53–54); Mazères, Ariège
- Noble family: Foix
- Spouses: Joan of Navarre; Joan of Albret; Joan of Urgell
- Issue Among others...: Gaston IV
- Father: Archambaud de Grailly
- Mother: Isabella, Countess of Foix

John I, Count of Foix also known as Jean de Foix-Grailly (1382 – 4 May 1436) was Count of Foix from 1428 until his death in 1436. He succeeded his mother Isabella, Countess of Foix. His father was Archambaud de Grailly.

== Life ==
=== Early life ===
As a result of the Treaty of Tarbes signed on 10 May 1399, John's parents were given possession of the County of Foix, but it required that his father renounce his English alliance, and it stipulated that John and one of his brothers were to be sent as hostages to the Royal Court of France to ensure observance of the terms of the treaty. On 24 April 1406 Charles VI of France recognised John as heir to the County of Foix and he was also involved in several operations against the English: the Siege of Bordeaux in 1404-1405 and the Seat of Blaye in 1406. In 1409, John accompanied King Martin of Aragon on an expedition to Sardinia against the Genoese at the Battle of Sanluri on 30 May 1409 and returned to Foix in September.

=== Aragon ===
When Martin died on 31 May 1410 without surviving children, two princes tried to claim the succession: Ferdinand of Castile, nephew of Martin and Louis II of Anjou, married to Yolande of Aragon, daughter of King John I of Aragon, brother and predecessor of Martin. The dowager Queen Violant of Aragon, widow of King John I, wrote to John on 20 January 1411 promising the return of Rosanes and Martorell (part of the properties confiscated from his maternal uncle Matthew of Foix) if her daughter Yolande succeeded to the throne, as a result John sent troops to help Louis and Yolande in their claim, but Ferdinand prevailed ultimately on 25 June 1412 by the compromise of Caspe. However, John was able to gain the lost estates by a marriage to Joanna of Urgell, granddaughter of Peter IV of Aragon.

John fought with Aragon against Castile, but helped his brother Peter, Cardinal of Foix and Arles, to crush insurgents from Aragon.

=== Count of Foix ===
John's father Archambaud died in 1412, John then became Count of Foix; he was co-ruler of Foix with his mother Isabella until her death in 1428.

In 1402, John married Joan, eldest daughter of Charles III of Navarre; two months after the wedding, she was formally recognised as heiress presumptive of Navarre. Navarre would have become part of the Foix inheritance if John and Joan had children, but they failed to produce children and Joan died in July 1413.

During the Hundred Years War, John switched his support between the English and French a few times, mainly for his own personal gain; always aligning with the side who promised him the most political and economic benefits at the relevant time. As sovereign of the Pyrenean Principality he took up a neutral stance in the war which was reflected in its motto ni Anglais, ni Français (Neither England, nor France).

John became Count of Bigorre in 1415 by agreement with Bernard VII, Count of Armagnac, the title was finally recognised by the King of France by letters dating from 18 November 1425, which definitively stabilized John's new position. The King of France installed him as Governor of Dauphiné in 1416. In 1425 he was appointed Governor of Languedoc and received from the King the title Viscount of Lautrec. He also bought the Viscountcy of Villemur.

Although John was sided with the French at the time, he did not take part in the Battle of Agincourt; the French army suffered a crushing defeat by the English forces commanded by King Henry V. John's brother Archambaud was killed during the battle.

John died 4 May 1436 and was succeeded by his son Gaston.

== Family ==
John married firstly to Joan of Navarre in 1402; they had no children.

John married secondly in 1422 to Joan of Albret. She was the daughter of Charles I of Albret, co-commander of the French Army in the Battle of Agincourt where in 1415 he was killed. John and Joan had two children:

- Gaston (27 November 1422 - 25 July/28 July 1472), succeeded his father and married Eleanor of Navarre (niece of John's first wife).
- Peter (died 1454) Viscount of Lautrec

After his second wife's death, John married thirdly in 1436 to Joan, daughter of James II of Urgell and Isabella of Aragon; they had no children, but the marriage helped John recover the remaining Spanish property he was owed.

John had four children by unknown mistresses:

- Isabella (died 1486) married 11 May 1443 to Bernard, Baron de Cauna and had issue
- Bernard, Seigneur de Gerderest married Praxede de Caramany
- John, Baron de Miossens and Sénéchal de Béarn
- Peter, Abbot of Sainte-Croix, Bordeaux

== Sources ==
- Biu, Hélène (2002). "Du panégyrique à l'histoire : l'archiviste Michel de Bernis, chroniqueur des comtes de Foix (1445)". Bibliothèque de l'École des chartes (in French). 160 (2): 385–473. doi:10.3406/bec.2002.451098.
- Higounet, Charles, ed. (1974). La seigneurie et le vignoble de Château Latour : histoire d'un grand cru du Médoc, XIVe-XXe siècle (in French). Fédération historique du Sud-Ouest.
- Lewis, P.S. (1985). "Le Dragon de Mauvezin et Jean I Comte de Foix (1412-36)". Essays in Later Medieval French History (in French). The Hambledon Press. pp. 37–40.
- Sumption, Jonathan (2016). Cursed Kings: The Hundred Years War IV. Faber & Faber.
- Woodacre, Elena (2013). The Queens Regnant of Navarre: Succession, Politics, and Partnership, 1274-1512. Palgrave Macmillan.

French nobility
Preceded by Isabella; Archambaud	Count of Foix; 1412-1436 with Isabella (1412–1428)	Succeeded by Gaston IV of Foix
Vacant Title last held by Jean III de Grailly	Count of Bigorre; 1415-1436	Succeeded by Gaston IV of Foix
