= Gaston I of Grailly =

Gaston I de Foix-Grailly († post 1455) was from 1412 to 1451 Captal de Buch, Count of Bénauges, and Viscount Castillon. He was a Knight of the Order of the Garter from 1438. Gaston was the second son and heir of Archambaud de Grailly and his wife, Countess Isabella of Foix.

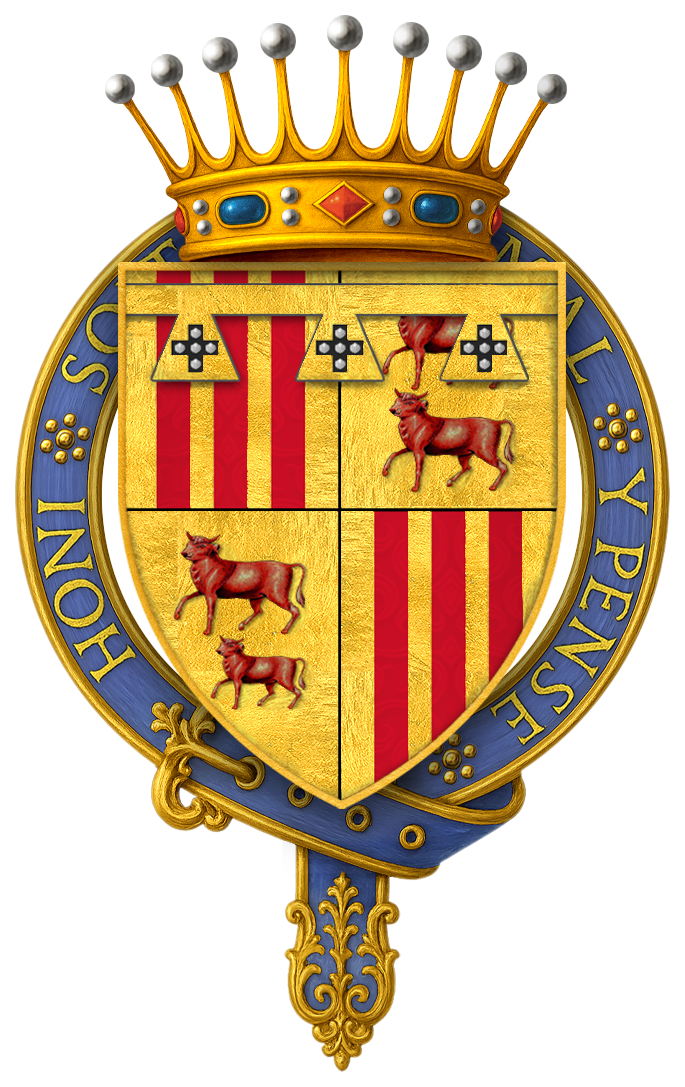
Garter-encircled Arms of Gaston de Foix, Captal de Buch, KG, as displayed on his Order of Garter stallplate: "Quarterly 1st and 4th Or three pallets Gules for de Foix; 2nd and 3rd Or two bulls statant in pale Gules armed collared and belled Or for Bearn; overall a label of three points Or on each point a cross Sable charged with five escallops Argent for de Grailly."

On his father's side Gaston stemmed from the House of Grailly, originally based on Lake Geneva. In the service of the English King the family held for several generations the Captal de Buch, an English governorship in Gascony. In this position the House of Grailly took a leading role in the Hundred Years' War against France. Through the marriage of Gaston's father, however, to the heiress of the Count of Foix, Matthew, and in response to military pressure, the family became subject to the King of France by the Treaty of Tarbes.

In accordance with this treaty, Gaston and his elder brother, John, were sent to the royal court at Paris as hostages, to guarantee the loyalty of their parents and to receive a proper education. However, after his father's death in 1412, Gaston inherited possessions including the Capitalate de Buch, for which he owed homage to the King of England, while his older brother, inheriting his mother's lands, remained a subject of the King of France. Therefore, the House of Foix-Grailly was split between the two sides of the Hundred Years' War, and Gaston was expected to fight for England, as his ancestors had done.

In late summer 1415, Gaston was a member of the army of Henry V of England, which landed on the coast of Normandy and conquered most of the region in the following years. Gaston took part in the victorious Battle of Agincourt on 25 October of the same year, while his brother, Count John I of Foix, fought for the other side. Early in the morning of 31 July 1419, Gaston captured Pontoise, whose defender, Jean de Villiers de L'Isle-Adam, surrendered the town without a fight, having been taken by surprise by a quick night march. This opened the way into the Île-de-France for the English army. Following the Treaty of Troyes in 1420, which recognised King Henry as rightful heir to the French throne, Gaston received the County of Longueville as a fief, but soon lost it after the death of Henry in 1422. When the balance of the war changed in favour of France with the rise of Joan of Arc, Gaston's lands in Gascony also fell into the hands of the French. Nonetheless, Gaston refused to recognise the Treaty of Pons on 12 June 1451, which governed the relationship between the French crown and the Gascoigne nobility, and denied his homage to Charles VII of France. Instead he sold the Capitalate de Buch to his nephew, Gaston IV of Foix, and to Jean de Dunois, and took himself into exile in Meilles in Aragon, where he died.

== Marriage and issue ==
From 1410 Gaston I de Foix-Grailly was married to Marguerite, a daughter of Arnaud-Amanieu d'Albret and his wife Marguerite de Bourbon. Three children were born from this marriage:

- John de Foix, 1st Earl of Kendal († 1485), from 1461 Captal de Buch, Count of Bénauges, Viscount Castillon and Meilles
- Isabella († 1504)

∞ I) Jacques de Pons, Viscount Turenne
∞ II) 1462 Don Pedro de Peralta y Ezpeleta, Conde de Santiseban y Lerín (possibly a great uncle of Charles II of Navarre) (House of France-Évreux)

- Agnes, married to Pey Poton de Lamensan

Also known are four illegitimate children of Gaston:

- Gaston, who joined the Cistercian Belleperche Abbey at Cordes Tolosannes (Tarn-et-Garonne)
- Jeannette
- Marguerite
- Jeanne
