= Viscount Castillon =

Place in south-western France

Coat of arms of Castillon-la-Bataille

The Viscount Castillon was situated in south-western France. At its centre was the town of Castillon-sur-Dordogne (now Castillon-la-Bataille). The purpose of the viscountcy, which has existed since the 10th century, was in the defence of the crossing over the river Dordogne.

The family of Viscounts lost their power because of a rebellion of Baron Guyenne against Simon de Montfort. At the end of the 13th century, Castillon passed to Jean I de Grailly, whose descendants ruled in Castillon - apart from a small altercation between England and France - until the 16th century.

The successor to the House of Grailly from the middle of the 16th century was the House La Tourd'Auvergne (Turenne). A descendant, André Leberthon, lost his feudal rights over Castillon during the French Revolution and sold Castillon in 1795.

== Viscounts Castillon ==
- Olivier (1060), Viscount Castillon, founder of Castillon monastery
- Pierre de Castillon, 1137 founder of Faize Abbey
- Jean I de Grailly
- Pierre II de Grailly, 1307/56 appointed, his son, Viscount de Bénauges and de Castillon; ∞ I Assalhilde de Bordeaux, Captal de Buch; ∞ II Rosemburge de Périgord, daughter of Hélie de Talleyrand, Comte de Périgord
- Jean II de Grailly († 1343), son from his first marriage, Captal de Buch, Vicomte de Bénauges et de Castillon; ∞ Blanche de Foix, daughter of Gaston I, Count of Foix
- Jean III de Grailly († 1376), his son, Captal de Buch
- Archambaud de Grailly, son of Pierre II from his second marriage, 1365 Vicomte de Castillon et de Gurson, 1376 Captal de Buch and Vicomte de Bénauges, 1398 Count of Foix etc.; ∞ Isabelle, 1398 Countess of Foix and Bigorre, Viscountess of Béarn and Castelbon etc., sister of Matthew, Count of Foix
- Gaston I de Foix-Grailly († post 1455), his son, 1412–1451 Captal de Buch, Count of Bénauges and Viscount Castillon, Herr von Grailly
- Jean IV de Foix-Grailly († 1485), his son, retained Castillon in 1461
- Gaston II de Foix-Candale († 1500), from 1485 Captal de Buch, Earl of Kendal and Bénauges as well as Viscount Castillon
- Alain, his son, Viscount Castillon
- …
- Louis de Gramont, 1535 Viscount Castillon (House of Dax), ∞ Madeleine d’Aydie known as de Lescun, daughter of Odet d’Aydie, Count of Comminges, Viscount Castillon and Fronsac
- Françoise, his daughter, Viscountess Castillon
