= 1364 =

1364 in various calendars
- Gregorian calendar: 1364; MCCCLXIV
- Ab urbe condita: 2117
- Armenian calendar: 813; ԹՎ ՊԺԳ
- Assyrian calendar: 6114
- Balinese saka calendar: 1285–1286
- Bengali calendar: 770–771
- Berber calendar: 2314
- English Regnal year: 37 Edw. 3 – 38 Edw. 3
- Buddhist calendar: 1908
- Burmese calendar: 726
- Byzantine calendar: 6872–6873
- Chinese calendar: 癸卯年 (Water Rabbit); 4061 or 3854 — to — 甲辰年 (Wood Dragon); 4062 or 3855
- Coptic calendar: 1080–1081
- Discordian calendar: 2530
- Ethiopian calendar: 1356–1357
- Hebrew calendar: 5124–5125
- Hindu calendars
- Vikram Samvat: 1420–1421
- Shaka Samvat: 1285–1286
- Kali Yuga: 4464–4465
- Holocene calendar: 11364
- Igbo calendar: 364–365
- Iranian calendar: 742–743
- Islamic calendar: 765–766
- Japanese calendar: Jōji 3 (貞治３年)
- Javanese calendar: 1277–1278
- Julian calendar: 1364; MCCCLXIV
- Korean calendar: 3697
- Minguo calendar: 548 before ROC 民前548年
- Nanakshahi calendar: −104
- Thai solar calendar: 1906–1907
- Tibetan calendar: ཆུ་མོ་ཡོས་ལོ་ (female Water-Hare); 1490 or 1109 or 337 — to — ཤིང་ཕོ་འབྲུག་ལོ་ (male Wood-Dragon); 1491 or 1110 or 338

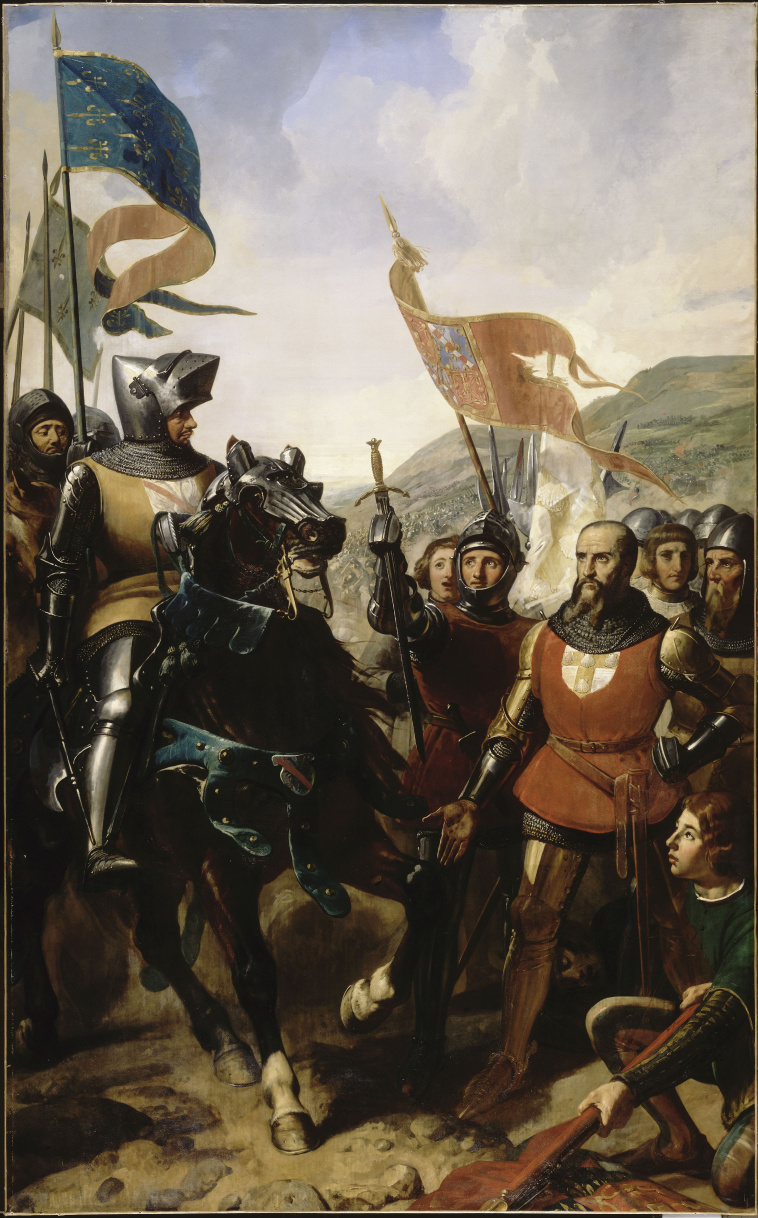
May 16: France's Bertrand du Guesclin accepts the surrender of Jean de Grailly and the Navarrese Army at the Battle of Cocherel to guarantee the coronation of King Charles V. (1839 painting by Charles-Philippe Larivière)

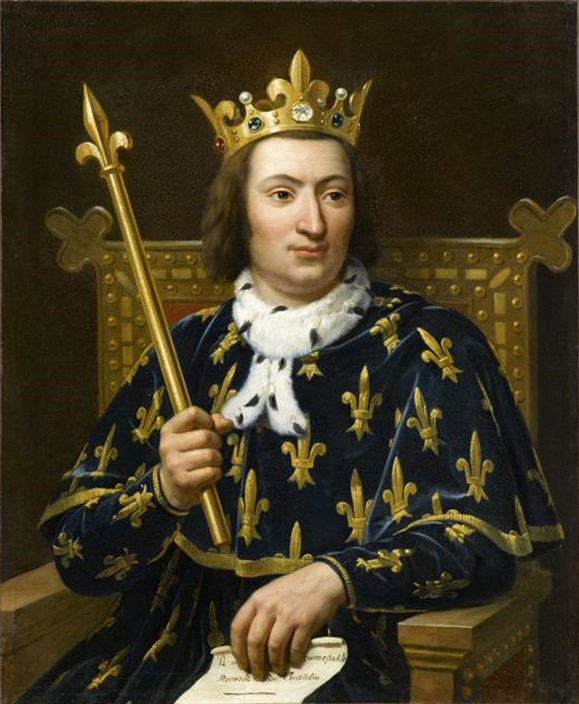
April 8: Charles V becomes the new King of France upon the death of his father, John the Good, in England.

Coat of arms of Philip II of Taranto, who became Titular Emperor of Constantinople and Prince of Taranto on September 10, 1364.

Year 1364 (MCCCLXIV) was a leap year starting on Monday of the Julian calendar.

== Events ==
=== January–March ===
- January 3 – Jean II le Bon ("John the Good"), King of France, voluntarily returns to imprisonment in England to secure the payment of his remaining ransom under the Treaty of Brétigny and in order to free the other hostages who had taken his place upon his release in 1363. King Jean's incarceration takes place as house arrest at the Savoy Palace in London, where he resides until his death on April 8.
- February 4 – Zhu Yuanzhang, the Duke of Wu, proclaims himself as "King of Wu" after defeating the rebel Chen Youliang at the Battle of Lake Poyang. At the same time, the rebel Zhang Shicheng also claimed the same title in the lower Yangtze River region.
- February 15 – Joint kings Magnus Eriksson and Haakon Magnusson of Sweden are both deposed by noblemen, who instead elect Magnus's nephew Albrekt of Mecklenburg the new king of Sweden. Albrekt is crowned as King on February 18 at a ceremony at the Stones of Mora of Knivsta, near Uppsala.
- February 20 – David II of Scotland marries Margaret Drummond.
- March 3 – In Italy, peace is worked out between the Duchy of Mirandola and the anti-Milan league after the January 10 attack on the city of Mirandola.

=== April–June ===
- April 1 – Pope Urban V issues a series of seven papal bulls to fund the Savoyard Crusade to be led by Count Amadeus VI of Savoy against the Moslem Ottoman Turks who control the Holy Land in the area surrounding Jerusalem.
- April 8 – Charles V becomes King of France upon the death of his imprisoned father, Jean II, in England.
- May 12 – The Jagiellonian University is founded in Kraków.
- May 16 – The Battle of Cocherel is fought in France over the matter of claim to the French throne recently vacated by the April death of King John the Good. Less than 3,000 troops commanded by General Bertrand du Guesclin, on behalf of King John's son Charles of Valois defend against a larger force of more than 5,000 soldiers and 300 archers sent by a rival claimant, King Carlos II of Navarre and commanded by Jean III de Grailly, with the help of English troops led by John Jouel. Guesclin is able to deceive the Navarrese and English troops by retreating and then surrounding the enemy, and King Charles is formally crowned three days later.
- May 19 – The coronation of King Charles V of France takes place at the Reims Cathedral in Reims.
- June 2 – King Charles V of France issues a letters patent to recognize that the King's youngest son, Philip the Bold, as the rightful Duke of the autonomous Duchy of Burgundy. King John II, Philip's late grandfather, had been allowed Philip to serve as Duke since September 6.

=== July–September ===
- July 28 – Battle of Cascina: Forces of the Republic of Florence, led by Galeotto Malatesta, defeat those of the Republic of Pisa.
- August 6 – Ignatius Saba I becomes the Syriac Orthodox Patriarch of Tur Abdin.
- September 10 – Philip of Anjou becomes Titular Emperor of Constantinople and Prince of Taranto.
- September 29 – Battle of Auray: The Breton War of Succession ends, with the victory of the House of Montfort over Charles of Blois.

=== October–December ===
- October 8 – Philotheos Kokkinos is appointed by the Byantine Emperor John V Palaiologos to the position of the Ecumenical Patriarch of Constantinople for the second time in his life, as leader of the Eastern Orthodox Christians. He had previously been the Patriarch from 1353 to 1354.
- November 16 – Vladislav I (also known as Vlaicu-Vodă) becomes voivode of Wallachia.
- December 4 – King Edward III of England summons the English Parliament and directs the members of the House of Lords and the House of Commons to assemble at Westminster on January 20.

=== Date unknown ===
- Bogdana Monastery is built in Moldavia.
- Rana Kshetra Singh succeeds Rana Hamir Singh, as ruler of Mewar (part of modern-day western India).
- Anavema Reddy succeeds Anavota Reddy, as ruler of the Reddy Dynasty in Andhra Pradesh (part of modern-day southern India).
- The Kingdom of Ava is established by Thado Minbya in modern-day northern Burma. Some chronicles and sources however date the event in 1365.

== Births ==
- September – Christine de Pizan, French writer (d. c.1430)
- November 30 – John FitzAlan, 2nd Baron Arundel, English soldier (d. 1390)
- December 16 – Emperor Manuel III of Trebizond (d. 1417)
- date unknown
  - al-Maqrizi, Egyptian historian and biographer (d. 1442)
  - Gyaltsab Je, first throne holder of the Gelug tradition of Buddhism (d. 1432)
  - Qāḍī Zāda al-Rūmī, Persian mathematician (d. 1436)

== Deaths ==
- April 8 – King John II of France (b. 1319)
- June 19 – Elisenda of Montcada, queen consort and regent of Aragon (b. 1292)
- June 30 – Arnošt of Pardubice, Archbishop of Prague (b. 1297)
- August 5 – Emperor Kōgon of Japan (b. 1313)
- September 10 – Robert of Taranto
- September 29 – Charles I, Duke of Brittany (b. 1319)
- date unknown
  - Nicholas Alexander, voivode of Wallachia
  - Gajah Mada, prime minister of the Majapahit empire
  - King Valdemar III of Denmark (b. 1314)
