= Jean de Grailly =

Jean de Grailly may refer to:

- Jean I de Grailly (died c. 1301), seneschal of Gascony, crusader
- Jean II de Grailly (died. 1343), great-grandson of prec., Captal de Buch
- Jean III de Grailly (died 1376), son of prec., Captal de Buch, founding knight of the Garter
- John I, Count of Foix (died 1436), also called Jean de Foix-Grailly
- John de Foix, 1st Earl of Kendal (died 1485), also called Jean de Foix-Grailly
