= Roger Bernard IV of Foix, Viscount of Castelbon =

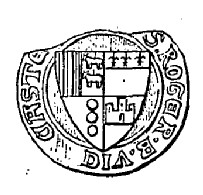
Seal of Roger-Bernard IV de Foix, viscount of Castelbon.

Roger Bernard IV of Foix (1310 - 1350) was viscount of Castelbon and other Catalan lands bequeathed by his parents Gaston I of Foix viscount of Foix and Bearn (died 1315) and Jeanne of Artois (died after 1350).

== Biography ==
He is the youngest of the sons of Gaston I of Foix-Béarn, and obtained the viscountcy of Castelbòn (Castellbò in Catalan) and the other Catalan lands, subject to paying homage to the elder branch, bequeathed to his elder brother, Gaston II of Foix-Béarn (1308-1343).

From Roger-Bernard IV thus comes the stem of Foix-Castelbon, which will later give the last counts of Foix of the first house, his grandchildren: Mathieu de Foix-Castelbon, then his sister, Isabelle de Foix-Castelbon, who married to Archambault de Grailly, capital of Buch.

== Marriage and children ==
He was married to Constance de Luna (†1353); from this marriage are born:

- Roger-Bernard V of Foix (died 1381), who inherited the viscountcy of Castelbòn, father of Matthew and Isabella;
- (?) Robert, who will be bishop of Lavaur;
- Marguerite, married Bernard III Viscount of Cabrera;
- Blanche, married 2nd Hugues Roger Count of Pallars.

Five bastards are known to him.
