= Archambaud of Grailly =

Count of Foix

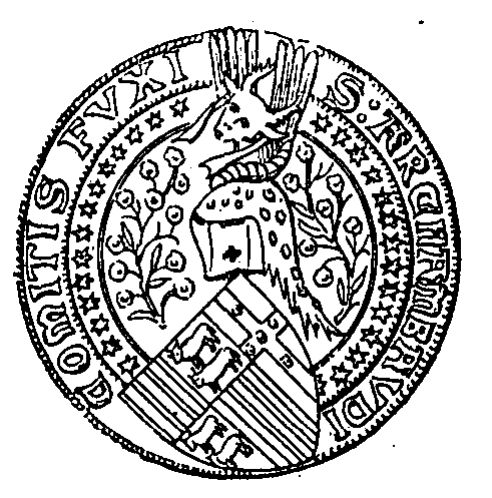

Archambaud de Grailly (1330 – 1412) was Viscount of Castillon and Gruson from 1356 until his death, and from 1369 Count of Bénauges and Captal de Buch. He was the younger son of Peter II of Grailly and his wife, Rosamburge of Périgord and was Count of Foix by his marriage to Isabella, Countess of Foix.

== Background and Hundred Years' War ==
Archambaud was a descendant of the noble House of Grailly, originally based at Lake Geneva. Archambaud's father, however, joined the service of King Edward III of England and was employed with the governorship in the south of the Guyenne (Capitalate de Buch), where the Grailly family proved themselves loyal in the Hundred Years' War against France.

After the death of his father, Archambaud inherited control over Castillon and Gruson. A little later, Archambaud fought, together with his nephew, Jean III de Grailly, on 19 September 1356, at the victorious Battle of Poitiers, where the King of France, John II was captured by the English. This victory led to the Treaty of Brétigny in 1360, by which England could continue its possession of a substantial part of southern France. In the following years the Graillys were involved in the defence of the conquered territories, which the French Bertrand du Guesclin was attempting to regain. In this they supported the King of Navarre, Charles II, who, aspiring for the French throne, was revolting against France. At the Battle of Cocherel on 16 May 1364, the Anglo-Navarrese army, led by the Graillys, was routed by the French under Bertrand du Guesclin. Archambaud and his nephew were captured. Archambaud is supposed to have been released in 1372 after the payment of 500 gold francs. By this time his nephew had died (1369) without progeny and Archambaud been declared his heir. Furthermore, Archambaud was made Seneschal of Biscay by the King of England on 2 March 1377.

== Change of Sides ==
In 1381 Archambaud married the only daughter of the Aragonese Viscount Castelbon. Isabelle de Foix belonged to the House of Foix, the head of which, Gaston Fébus, was one of the most powerful and richest princes in the south of France. Isabelle was a second cousin of Gaston. At about the same time, however, the only son and heir of Gaston Fébus died, and in 1398 Isabelle's younger brother, Matthew, died too, without leaving an heir. Therefore, Isabelle, as the last member of the House of Foix, inherited the extensive holdings.

Archambaud became, co-regent of the County of Foix suo uxoris, viscount of Béarn, Marsan, Lautrec, and Castelbon, as well as co-prince of Andorra. The King of France, however, objected to this inheritance, as one of the largest territories of the Kingdom would fall into the hands of a subject of England. Thereofore the French Connétable de Sancerre marched into the County of Foix with an army and occupied large parts of it. Isabelle and Archambaud could not counter this threat alone and showed themselves ready to subject themselves to French authority. In the Treaty of Tarbes, 10 May 1399, Isabelle and Archambaud recognized the French King as their feudal lord for the County of Foix, Archambaud cancelled his allegiance to England, and the couple sent their two eldest sons as hostages to the royal court at Paris.

The position of the new comital dynasty of Foix inside the French Kingdom was thereby guaranteed. Similarly, descendants of Archambaud were to bear the names and arms of the family of his wife, dropping those of the House of Grailly. Archambaud was spared from conflicts of loyalty between England and France, as the Hundred Years' War had been halted at this time by internal conflicts in both kingdoms. Archambaud was rewarded for his new loyalty to France when in 1412 he was made Lieutenant-General of Languedoc. He died a short time thereafter.

== Marriage and issue ==
Archambaud de Grailly was married to Isabella, Countess of Foix († 1428) from 1381. Together they had five sons:

- John I, Count of Foix (* 1382; † 4. Mai 1436), successor as Count of Foix, Viscount Béarn, Marsan, Lautrec, and Castelbon, and Co-Prince of Andorra
- Gaston I de Foix-Grailly († post 1455), Captal de Buch, Count of Longueville, Viscount Bénauges, and Lord of Grailly
- Archambaud († 10 September 1419), Lord of Navailles, in the service of Duke John the Fearless of Burgundy, with whom he was murdered on the bridge at Montereau
- Mathieu de Foix-Comminges († December 1453), ∞ I) 1419 Countess Marguerite de Comminges, ∞ II) 1446 Catharine d’Aspet
- Pierre de Foix, le vieux (* 1386; † 13 December 1464 at Avignon), from 1409 Cardinal, 1405–1422 Bishop of Lescar, 1450–1463 Archbishop of Arles

== Sources ==
- Petit-Dutaillis, Ch. (1924). "Histoire de France". Revue Historique. 145 (2): 219–234.
- Sumption, Jonathan (2016). Cursed Kings: The Hundred Years War IV. Faber & Faber.
- Vernier, Richard (2008). Lord of the Pyrenees: Gaston Fébus, Count of Foix (1331-1391). The Boydell Press.
- Viader, Roland (2003). L'Andorre du IXe au XIVe siècle: montagne, féodalité et communautés (in French). Presses du Universitaires du Mirail.
