= Château d'Aurignac =

Coordinates: 43°13′11″N 0°52′48″E

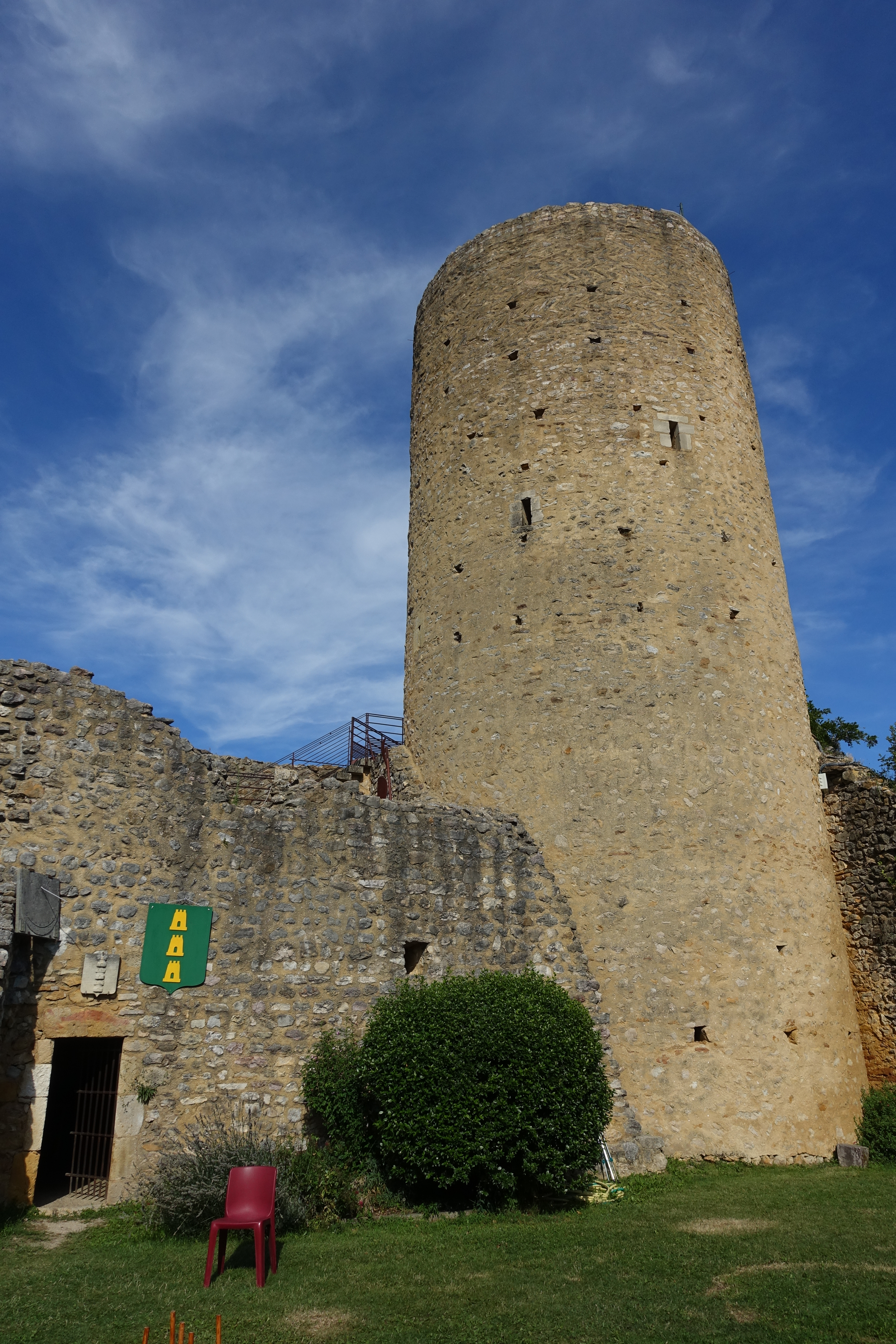
Restored keep of Château d'Aurignac of the 13th century

The Château d'Aurignac is a ruined 13th century castle in the commune of Aurignac in the Haute-Garonne département of France.

The castle was built on a hill before 1240 by Bernard V, Counts of Comminges, and the village developed around it. In 1583 a group of bandits occupied the Chateau d'Aurignac, using it as a base to plunder the local population. At the request of the inhabitants of the town, the Senechal of Toulouse drove the bandits out and partly demolished the chateau. The extent to which it was demolished was disputed: a record of 1627 describes the roofs collapsed but the walls standing. All that remains today are the church, a well-restored keep on the peak of the hill and some of the ramparts, which have been incorporated into houses.

The property of the commune, it has been listed since 1979 as a monument historique by the French Ministry of Culture.

== See also ==
- List of castles in France
