= House of Grailly =

House of Grailly House of Foix-Grailly
- Arms of House of Grailly
- Country: France; England; Kingdom of Navarre
- Founded: 12th century
- Founder: Gerard de Grailly
- Final ruler: Catherine of Navarre
- Titles: King of Navarre; Duke of Nemours; Count of Foix; Count of Comminges; Count of Bigorre; Earl of Kendal; Viscount of Béarn; Viscount of Benauges; Viscount of Castillon; Lord of Grailly; Lord of Buch
- Cadet branches: House of Foix-Grailly

The House of Grailly is a noble family from the Pays de Gex, which rose in the southern French nobility through marriage.

== History ==
The family originated from Lake Geneva in the County of Savoy. Jean I de Grailly presumably was part of Peter II of Savoy entourage, whose niece married King Henry III of England. Jean would gain royal favour from King Edward I England and would receive the viscounty of Benauges. Later generations would gain among others, the County of Foix, the Duchy of Nemours, and the Kingdom of Navarre.
