= Mathieu de Foix-Comminges =

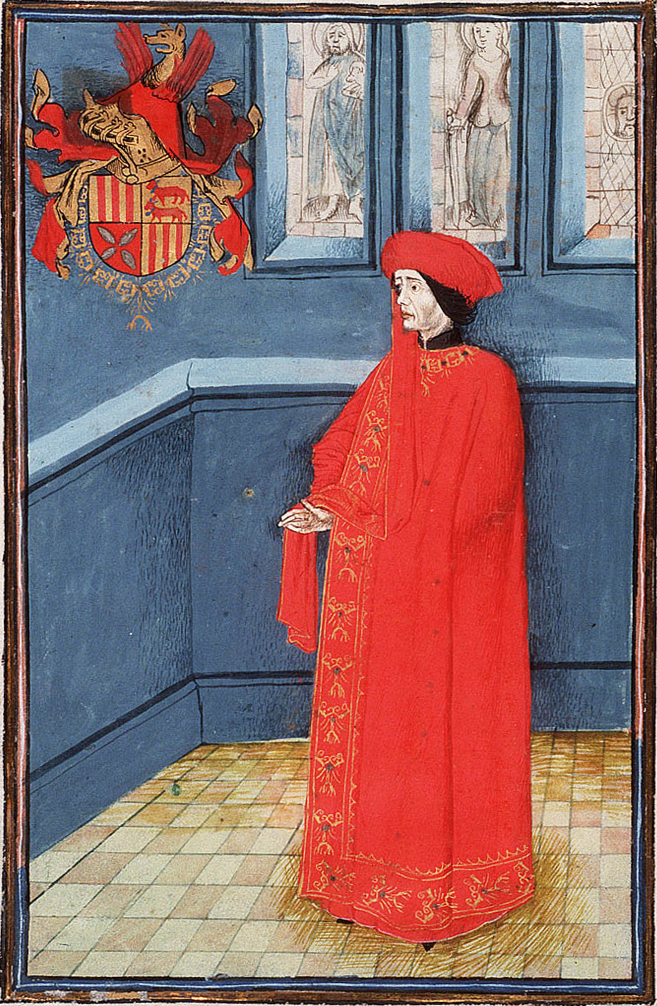
Mathieu de Foix-Comminges

Mathieu de Grailly or Mathieu de Foix (died 1453) was Count of Comminges between 1419 and 1443.

He was the fourth son of Archambaud de Grailly, captal de Buch and Isabella, Countess of Foix.

== Biography ==
He was knighted in 1413 and became a member of the entourage of John the Fearless, Duke of Burgundy. For his loyalty, King Charles VI of France, allied with Philip the Good Duke of Burgundy, gave him Narbonne, of which he couldn't take possession, because it was under control of Dauphin Charles, then at war with his father and Burgundy.

At that time, he married Marguerite de Comminges, twenty years older than him, an authoritarian woman who allegedly had her second husband killed in prison. Fearing a similar fate, Mathieu had his wife locked up a few months later in the castle of Bramevaque and governed Comminges alone. Following his brother, he defected from the Burgundian camp to King Charles VII of France, who rewarded him by making him governor of the Dauphiné from 1426 to 1428.

After the death of his brother John I, Count of Foix, Matthieu became regent of his nephew Gaston IV and in 1439 he bought off Rodrigo de Villandrando and his raiders to leave the County of Foix.
Meanwhile, the unsatisfied people of Comminges petitioned the return of their Countess Marguerite from King Charles VII, who ordered her release. Mathieu refused and transferred his wife to Foix. Again allied with Burgundy, he became a Knight in the Order of the Golden Fleece in 1440. Charles VII put the County of Comminges under guardianship of John IV, Count of Armagnac and in 1441 war broke out between Foix and Armagnac, only interrupted in 1442 by a campaign against the English. After this campaign, Charles VII again ordered the liberation of Marguerite on 17 January 1443 and now, Mathieu was forced to obey. Marguerite was released on 9 March but died shortly after, leaving Comminges to the Crown.

In 1449 Mathieu accompanied Gaston IV to besiege Mauléon. He died 4 years later.

== Marriage and children ==
On 16 July 1419 he married Marguerite de Comminges (died 1443), no issue.

He remarried, in 1446, Catherine de Coarraze, and had two daughters Jeanne and Marguerite.

Mathieu had also two illegitimate children by unknown mistresses:

- Jean de Foix, Bishop of Dax and Comminges.
- Jeanne Catherine de Foix, married Jean de Château-Verdun
