= Pierre de Foix, le vieux =

French cardinal

Styles of Peter of Foix
- Reference style: His Eminence
- Spoken style: Your Eminence
- Religious style: (autofilled)
- Informal style: Cardinal

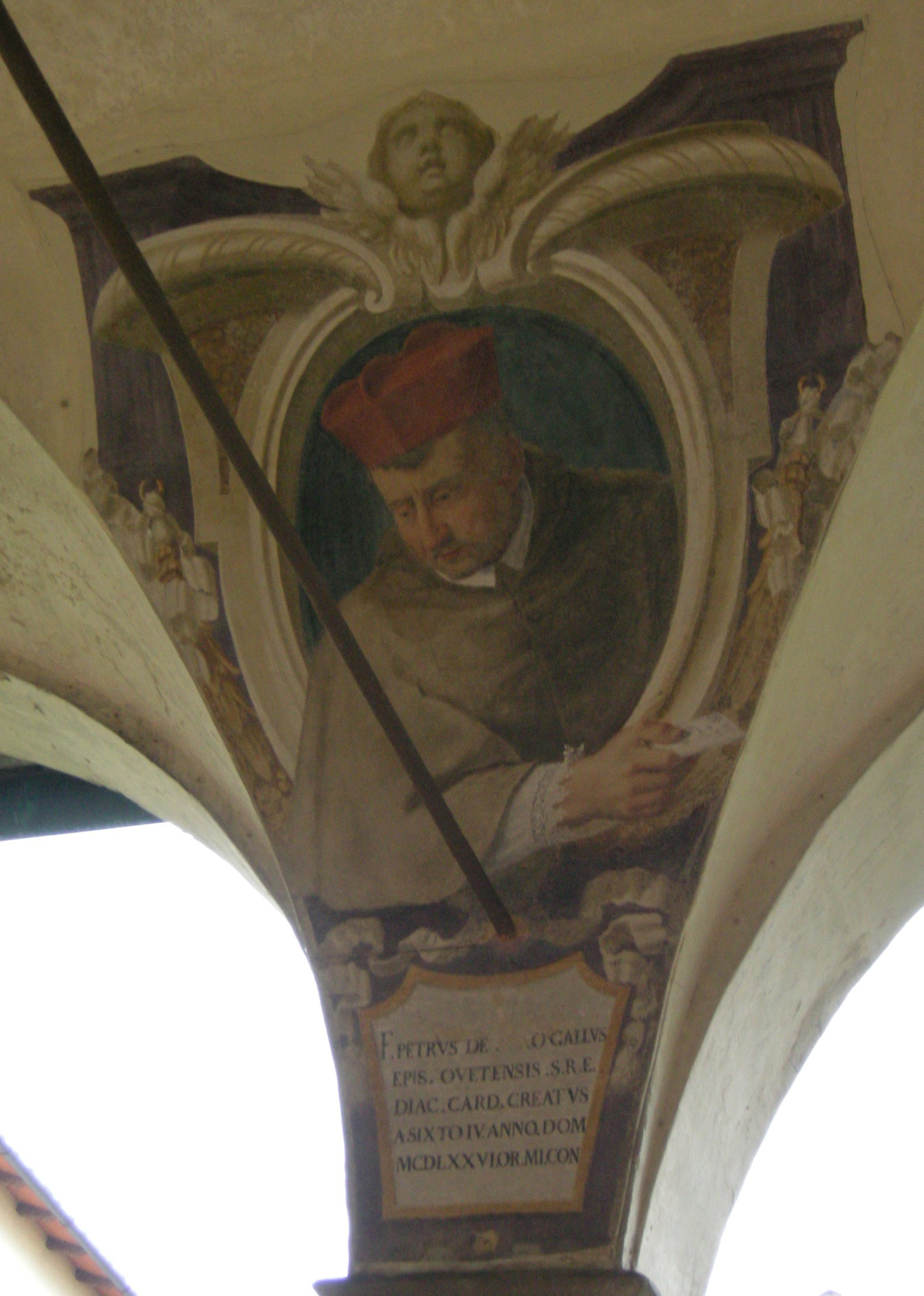
Cardinal Pierre de Foix

Peter of Foix the Elder (Fr.: Pierre de Foix, le vieux) (1386 – 13 December 1464) was a French cardinal, created in 1409.

He was the son of Archambaud de Grailly, captal de Buch and Isabella, Countess of Foix.

He was a papal legate in Avignon (1433–1464) and Archbishop of Arles from 1450 to 1463.

He founded the Collège de Foix in Toulouse.
