= Roger-Bernard V of Foix, Viscount of Castelbon =

Viscount of Castelbon

Roger-Bernard V de Foix (c. 1330 – 1381) was viscount of Castelbon. He was the son of Roger Bernard IV of Foix, viscount of Castelbon and Constance de Luna. He was the eighth degree ancestor of King Henry IV of France.

== Biography ==
He was the youngest of the sons of Roger-Bernard IV de Foix, viscount of Castelbon and Constance de Luna, and obtained the viscountcy of Castelbòn (Castelbò in Catalan) and the other Catalan lands.

== Marriage and issue ==
He married Géraude de Navailles; from this marriage were born:

- Matthew (died 1398), he succeeded Gaston III, Count of Foix (his first cousin once removed) as count of Foix.
- Isabella 1361–1428, she succeeded her brother as countess of Foix. Married to Archambaud of Grailly viscount of Castillon & Gruson and they found the branch of Foix-Grailly.
  - John I, Count of Foix
    - Gaston IV, Count of Foix
