= Château de Nemours =

Castle in Seine-et-Marne, France

Coordinates: 48°15′56″N 2°41′49″E

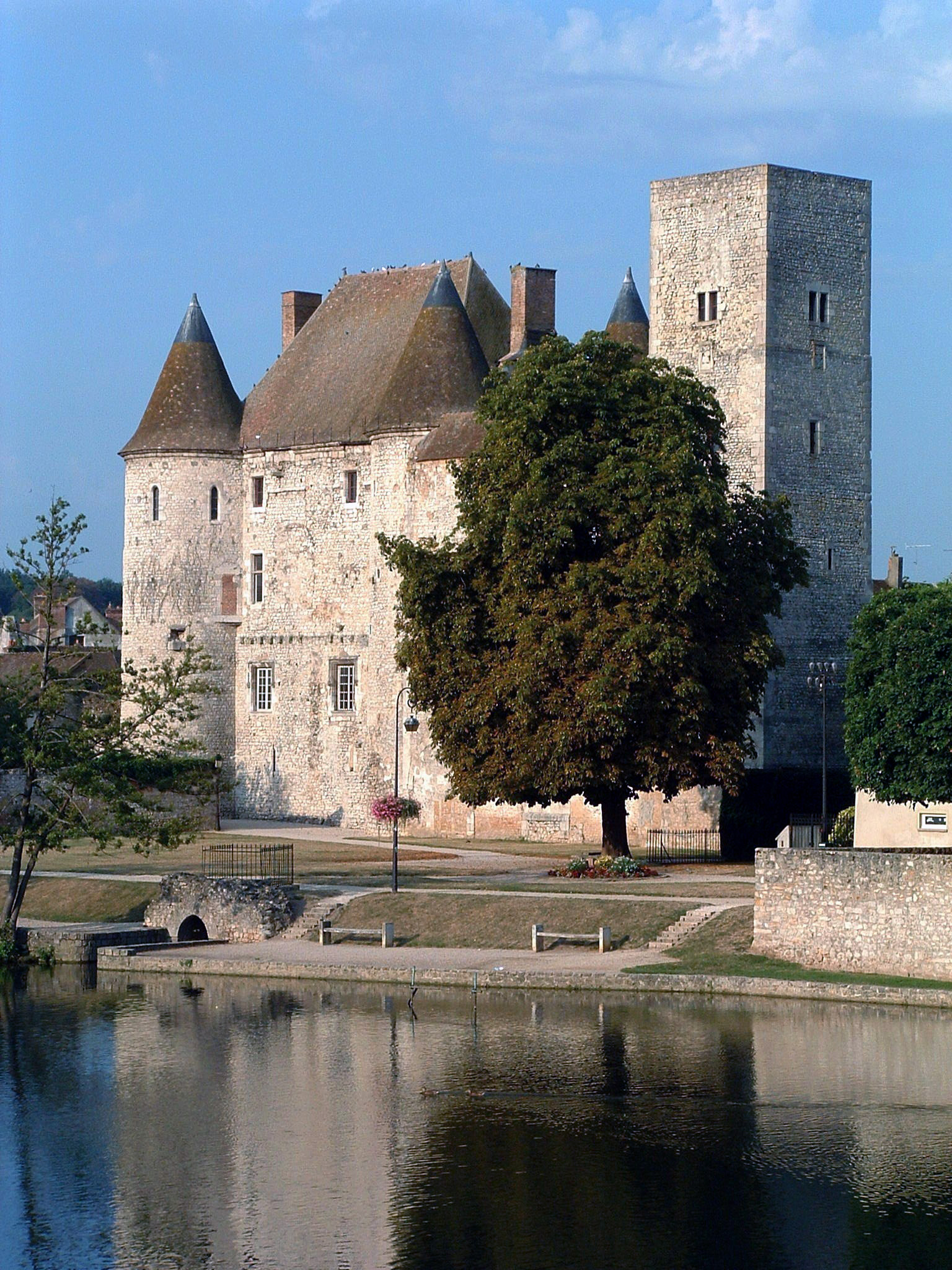
Château de Nemours on banks of Loing River

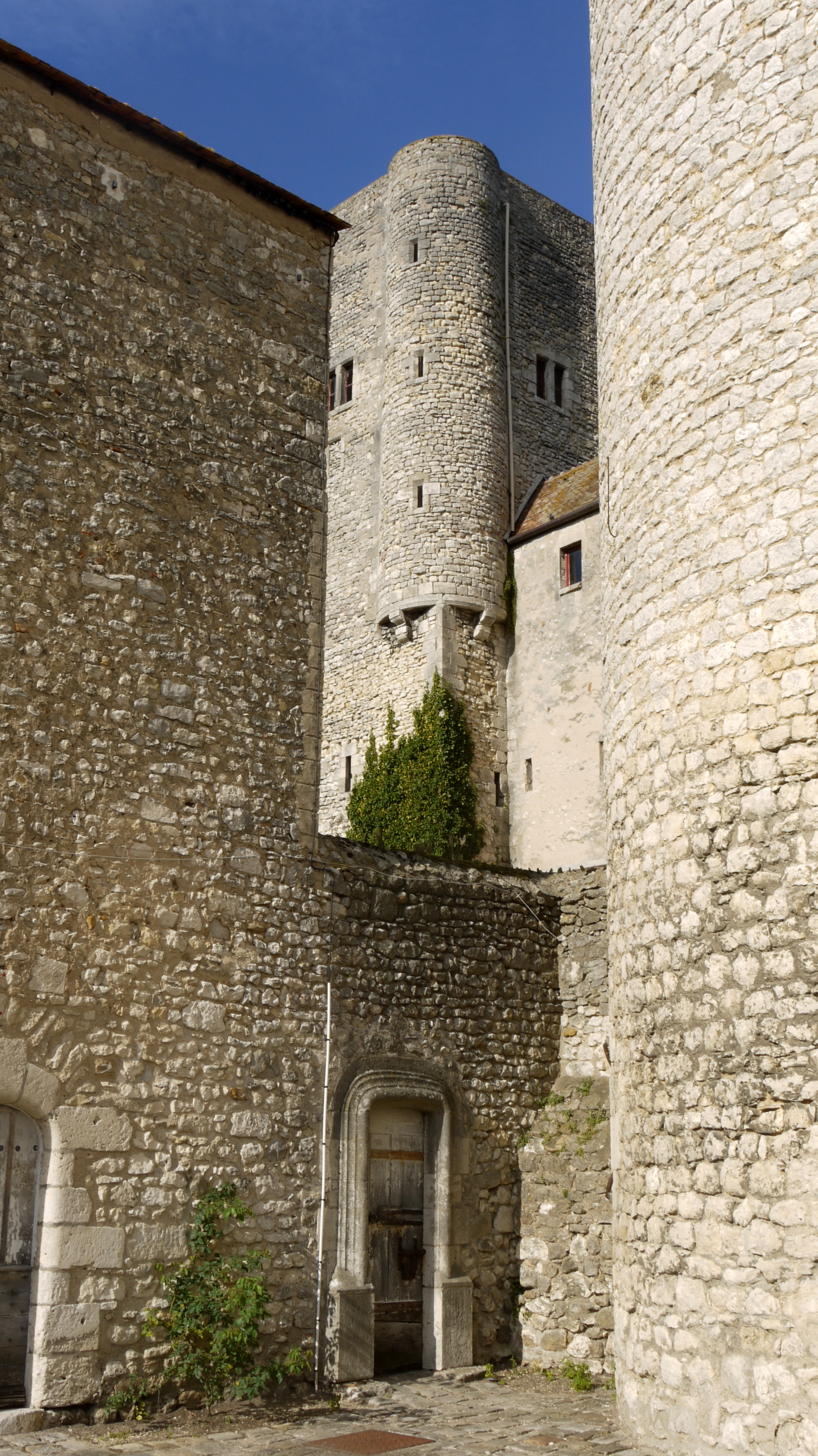
Watch tower

The Château de Nemours is a castle in the town and commune of Nemours in the Seine-et-Marne département of France. Located in the extreme south of the Paris conurbation, it stands on the banks of the Loing river. Transformed into a museum between 1903 and 1999, it houses collections of pottery.

The remains of the former chapel were added to the register of ancient monuments in 1926. The castle itself was made a monument historique by the French Ministry of Culture in 1977.

== History ==
Significant construction phases were in the first half of the 12th century, the 14th century, the 15th century and the 17th century.

The first stones of the building were laid around 1120 by Orson on left bank of the Loing. A village had been established on a nearby hill since the Merovingian era (according to the excavation in 1898 of Merovingian sarcophagi) in Saint les Nemours, on the left bank of the Loing. The first lords had probably installed a high castle mound on the right bank of the Loing in a place still called "le chatelet". The establishment of such a work next to the Loing was justified by the presence of a ford permitting crossing of the river before the construction of a later bridge.

In 1170, the second lord of Nemours (of which there is a record), Gauthier I de Villebéon, chamberlain to king Louis VII, obtained a charter for his commune. At the time of the Hundred Years' War, the town was burnt in 1359 by the troops of Jean de Grailly and the Captal of Bush. In 1404, the town became a duchy-peerage but it fell 16 years later at the hands of English. It was released from their influence in 1437 by Jacques of Anjou.

The castle had only a few modifications during the following centuries. It was altered in the 15th century by Jacques d' Armagnac who added mullioned windows to make the keep a more pleasant place to live. At the time of the Wars of Religion between Catholics and Protestants, it was the site of the signature of the Treaty of Nemours in 1585 between Catherine de' Medici and the Duke of Guise, which ratified the progress of the Catholic League and urged Protestants to leave the kingdom, before “good” King Henri IV finally put an end to the quarrels nearly a century later with the Edict of Nantes.

In the middle of the 17th century, the castle became a law court under Anne Hédelin, lieutenant general of the Duke of Orleans. The latter also changed the castle entrance to open it onto the main courtyard and its monumental staircase (perron).

== Architecture ==
The castle is composed of a girdled keep of four round towers and a square watch tower overlooking the valley of the Loing. The main courtyard is surrounded by medieval houses which constitute the heart of the historical heritage of the town between the communal mills, the church and the district of the clerics.

== See also ==
- List of castles in France
