= John Jouel =

English soldier

Sir John Jouel (died 16 May 1364) was an English soldier best remembered for his actions against French forces led by Bertrand du Guesclin in the Battle of Cocherel during the Hundred Years' War.

== Account of his life ==
French poet and court historian Jean Froissart conveyed a heroic account of Jouel in his chronicles relating to the Battle of Cocherel. In Froissart's writings, Jouel is described as being a bold knight and "performed, that day, many very gallant feats of arms, and never deigned once to retreat."

However, Froissart's writings also revealed a critical error in military judgment made by Jouel, in which he was lured into pursuing Du Guesclin's fleeing forces. The error led to the capture of Jean de Grailly, the Captal (leader) of the Navarrese army causing his force to fall into abysmal disarray.

Froissart further detailed that despite Jouel's valor and fighting skill, he sustained several wounds to his body and head before being captured by a squire of Brittany under the command of Bertrand du Guesclin. Along with Jouel, many more knights were captured or killed as French forces ultimately achieved the day's victory. Before the day's end and while still a prisoner, Jouel would succumb to his wounds.
