= Captal =

Mediaeval feudal title in France

Captal (Lat. capitalis, first, chief ), was a medieval feudal title in Gascony. According to Du Cange the designation captal (capital, captau, capitau) was applied loosely to the more illustrious nobles of Aquitaine, counts, viscounts, etc., probably as capitales domini, principal lords, though he quotes more fanciful explanations.

As an actual title the word was used only by the lords of Trene, Puychagut, Epernon and Buch (a lordship being an amalgamation of two or more seigniories).

It is best known in connection with the soldier Jean III de Grailly, Captal de Buch (d. 1376), memorialized by Jean Froissart as the confidant of the Black Prince and a champion of the English cause against France in the 14th century.
