= Counts of Comminges =

Coat of arms of the ancient counts of Comminges: Argent, a cross patty gules..

The modified coat of arms of the counts of Comminges since the 17th century: Gules four otelles Argent addorsed in saltire..

This is a list of counts of the County of Comminges.

== Counts of Comminges ==
=== House of Comminges ===
Aznar I-Sanche was created Count of Gascony by Pepin I, King of Aquitaine, around 820. He made his son Garcia Aznar Viscount of Comminges in 833. When his father died in 836, Garcia Aznar became Count of Comminges and Couseran.

Ruler	Dates	Gascon line	Notes
Garcia Aznar	836–846	Comminges line	First known count of Comminges. Garcia descended agnatically from Aznar Sánchez of Gascony.
Aznar Garcia	846–905	Comminges line	Son of the predecessor.
Lupus I Aznar	905–935	Comminges line	Son of the predecessor.
Aznar II	935–946	Comminges line	Son of the predecessor.
Arnaud I	946–957	Comminges line	Son of the predecessor.
Roger I The Old	957–1011	Carcassonne line	Sons of the predecessor, probably ruled jointly. Roger was also the founder of the County of Carcassonne.
Arnaud II	957–988	Comminges line	Sons of the predecessor, probably ruled jointly. Roger was also the founder of the County of Carcassonne.
Odo	1011–1035	Comminges line	Sons of Arnaud II, ruled jointly.
Roger II	1011–1035	Comminges line	Sons of Arnaud II, ruled jointly.
Arnaud III	1035–1070	Comminges line	Son of Roger II.
Roger III	1035–1105	Comminges line	Son of Arnaud III.
Bernard I	1105–1145	Comminges line	Son of the predecessor.
Bernard II	1145–1153	Comminges line	Son of the predecessor.
Bernard III	1153–1176	Comminges line	Brother of the predecessor, born Dodon de Samatan, later changed his name after his brother's death.
Bernard IV	1176–1225	Comminges line	Son of the predecessor. Also, by marriage, Count of Bigorre.
Bernard V	1225–1241	Comminges line	Son of the predecessor.
Bernard VI	1241–1295	Comminges line	Son of the predecessor.
Bernard VII	1295–1312	Comminges line	Son of the predecessor.
Bernard VIII	1312–1336	Comminges line	Son of the predecessor.
John I The Posthumous	1336–1339	Comminges line	Son of the predecessor.
Peter Raymond I	1339–1341	Comminges line	Brother of Bernard VIII.
Peter Raymond II	1341–1376	Comminges line	Son of the predecessor.
Margaret	1376–1443	Comminges line	Daughter of the predecessor. Co-ruler with her husbands, John III, Count of Armagnac, John of Armagnac (son of Geraud, Viscount of Fezensaguet) and Mathieu of Foix. At his death in 1453, Comminges was reunited to the French crown by King Charles VII of France.

=== House of Lescun ===
In 1462, the king of France Louis XI detached the county of Comminges from the royal domain and gave it to his friend.

- 1462–1472 : Jean de Lescun (illegitimate son of Arnaud-Guillaume of Lescun, bishop of Aire, and of Anne of Armagnac, born ? – died 1472, known as the Bastard of Armagnac, Marshal of France)

=== House of Aydie ===
At the death of John of Lescun in 1472, the county of Comminges passed to:

- 1472–1498 : Odet d'Aydie (husband of Marie of Lescun, heiress of Lescun as daughter of Mathieu of Lescun, himself probably a cousin of John of Lescun, born c. 1425 – died 1498, constable of France, supreme commander of the French army and close advisor of Louis XI)

In 1498, at the death of Odet d'Aydie, who did not have a son, king Louis XII of France definitely reunited the county of Comminges to the French crown. The descendants of Odet d'Aydie's daughter continued to carry the title of count of Comminges.

=== House of Foix-Lautrec ===
- Jean of Foix-Lautrec, count of Comminges (1472–1494).
- Odet of Foix, Viscount of Lautrec, count of Comminges, Marshal of France (1494–1528).
- Enrique de Foix-Lautrec, count of Comminges (1528–1540).
- Claudia de Foix-Lautrec, contesse of Rethel, of Cominges, of Beaufort in Champagne, vicecontesse of Lautrec (1540–1553).

=== House of La Barthe ===
- Paul de La Barthe, seigneur de Termes in Couserans, Marshal of France. count of Comminges (1552–1562).

=== House of Comminges-Guitaut ===
- Gaston of Comminges, count of Comminges (1638–1670).
- Louis of Comminges, count of Comminges (1670–1712).

=== House of Comminges-Lastronque ===
- Roger James of Comminges, count of Comminges (1718–1785).
- Roger Louis of Comminges, count of Comminges (1785–1789).
- Roger Aymeric of Comminges, count of Comminges (1789–1840).

=== House of Comminges-Saint-Lary ===
- Elie de Comminges, count of Comminges and Baron Saint-Lary (1840–1894).
- Aimery Elie de Comminges, count of Comminges and Baron Saint-Lary (1894–1925).
- Bertrand de Comminges, count of Comminges and Baron de Saint-Lary(1925–1987).
- Aimery Bertrand Geoffroy Elie de Comminges, count of Comminges (1925-1994)
- Jean-Odon de Comminges, count of Comminges (1987–2015).
- Aimery Fouré-de Comminges, count of Comminges (2011-)
