= Isabella of Foix =

French countess

Isabella
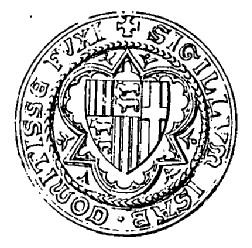
- Seal of Isabella

Co-Princess of Andorra
- Reign: 1398–1412
- Predecessor: Matthew
- Successor: John I
- Co-ruler: Galcerand de Vilanova

Countess of Foix
- Reign: 1398–1428
- Predecessor: Matthew
- Successor: John I
- Co-rulers: Archambaud (1398–1412); John I (1412–1428)
- Born: before 2 November 1361
- Died: 1428
- Burial: Abbey of Boulbonne
- Spouse: Archambaud de Grailly
- Issue: John I, Count of Foix; Gaston of Foix; Archambaud of Foix; Matthew of Foix; Peter, Archbishop of Arles
- House: Foix
- Father: Roger-Bernard V of Foix, Viscount of Castelbon
- Mother: Gerauda of Navailles

Isabella of Foix also known as Isabella of Foix-Castelbon (before 2 November 1361 – 1428) was sovereign Countess of Foix and Viscountess of Béarn from 1399 until 1428. She was Countess of Foix in her own right, but shared power with her husband and later with her son. She succeeded as countess along with her husband upon the death of her childless brother Matthew.

== Life ==
Isabella was the daughter of Roger-Bernard V of Foix, Viscount of Castelbon and his wife Gerauda of Navailles. She was the eldest of three children, her two brothers were the aforementioned Matthew and Roger-Bernard, who died young.

Isabella married Archambaud de Grailly in 1381.

=== Countess of Foix ===
After the death of her younger brother Matthew in 1398, who had tried to claim the Aragonese crown for his wife Joanna, Isabella was the last living member of the House of Foix and was heir of a large ownership which focused especially on the northern slopes of the Pyrenees. This heritage was to be denied to Isabella by the French Crown because of her marriage to Archambaud, whose family had been supporters of the English during the Hundred Years' War. Charles VI of France wanted to prevent Foix from falling under the influence of England, so a royal army under the leadership of the Constable de Sancerre invaded Foix and occupied large portions. In this situation, Isabella and her husband were willing to submit to the French Crown. The Treaty of Tarbes on 10 May 1399 saw Isabella made countess as long as her husband stopped his alliance with the English and allowed the two oldest sons of the couple to be taken to the royal court.

The fate of the new Foix dynasty during the French feudal period was reflected in its name because Isabella's descendants renounced the leadership of the name and coat of arms of Grailly in favor of the House of Foix's. The loyalty of the new dynasty of Foix to France was awarded in 1412, when Archambaud was appointed lieutenant-general of the Languedoc. In 1402 Isabella and her husband arranged the marriage of their eldest son, John, to the eldest daughter of Charles III of Navarre, Joan, who was formally recognised as heir to the kingdom later that year. This marriage was intended to make a union between Foix and Navarre. However, in 1413, Joan died leaving no issue, and all hope of a union had failed.

Foix was a neighbour of the Crown of Aragon. The conditions were relaxed after 1400 when King Martin of Aragon refunded Isabella the county of Castelbon which the king had withdrawn from her brother in 1386, after he fought for the crown.

Archambaud died in 1413, Isabella died in 1428 and was buried in the Abbey of Boulbonne, the resting place of her ancestors.

== Children ==
Isabella and Archambaud had:

- John (c.1382- 4 May 1436), succeeded as John I, Count of Foix. He married three times; he had two sons by his second wife, Jeanne d'Albret (1403–1433), who was the daughter of Charles I of Albret, commander of the French forces at the Battle of Agincourt, and Marie, Dame de Sully. His third wife was Joanna of Urgell, daughter of James II of Urgell and Infanta Isabella, daughter of Peter IV of Aragon.
- Gaston (died after 1455), married Margaret d'Albret daughter of Arnaud Amanieu d'Albret
- Archambaud (d.10 September 1419), married Sancha de Cabrera and had a daughter named Isabelle
- Matthew (died December 1453), married firstly to Margaret, Countess of Comminges, had no issue; secondly to Catherine of Coarraze, by whom he had two daughters. He also fathered two illegitimate children by mistresses whose identities are unknown.
- Peter (1386- 13 December 1464), Archbishop of Arles

== Sources ==
- Garrigues, Véronique (2006). Adrien de Monluc (1571–1646) d'encre et de sang (in French). PULIM.
- Lerga, Álvaro Adot (2005). Juan de Albret y Catalina de Foix o la defensa del estado navarro (1483–1517) (in Spanish). Pamiela.
- Sumption, Jonathan (2015). The Hundred Years War. Vol. IV: Cursed Kings. Faber & Faber.
- Vernier, Richard (2008). Lord of the Pyrenees, Gaston Fébus, Count of Foix (1331–1391). The Boydell Press.

Isabella of Foix House of Foix-Castelbón Cadet branch of the House of Foix Born: bef. 2 November 1361 Died: circa 1428
French nobility
Preceded by Matthew	Countess of Foix; Viscountess of Béarn; 1398-1428 with Archambaud (1398–1412); John I (1412–1428)	Succeeded by John I
