= Battle of Cocherel =

Part of the Hundred Years' War

Coordinates: 49.0747°N 1.3647°E

- Part of Hundred Years' War
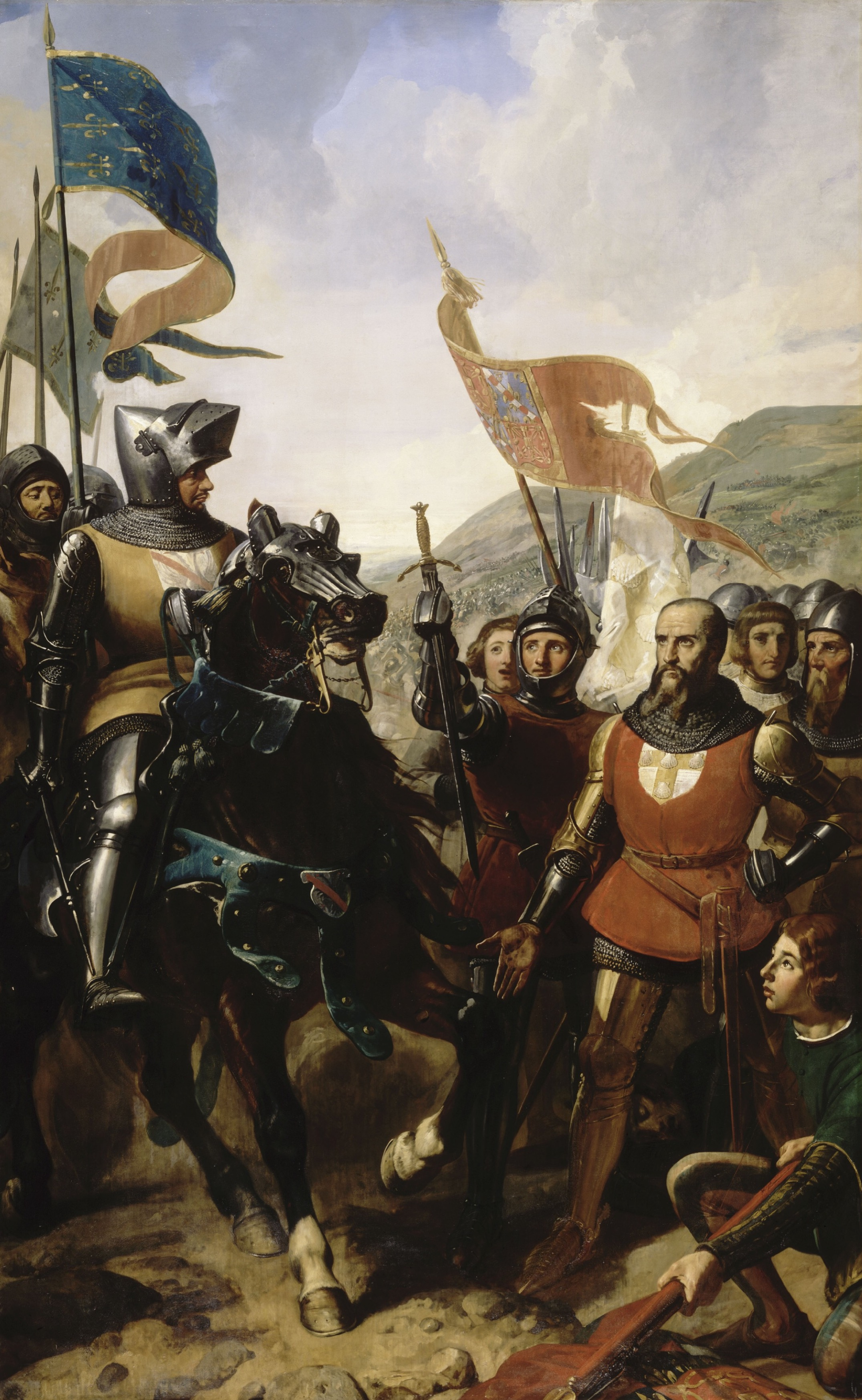
- Bataille de Cocherel, 16 mai 1364 (oil on canvas by Charles-Philippe Larivière, 1839) depicts Jean de Grailly surrendering to Bertrand du Guesclin
Date	16 May 1364
Location	near of Houlbec-Cocherel (Eure)
Result	French victory

Belligerents
Kingdom of France	Kingdom of Navarre; Kingdom of England

Commanders and leaders
Bertrand du Guesclin	Jean III de Grailly (POW); John Jouel

Strength
1,500–3,000	5,000–6,000; 300 archers

Casualties and losses
Unknown	Unknown

The Battle of Cocherel was fought on 16 May 1364 between the forces of Charles V of France and the forces of Charles II of Navarre (known as Charles the Bad) under the command of Bertrand du Guesclin, over the succession to the Kingdom of France. The result was a French victory.

== Background ==
The French crown had been at odds with Navarre (near southern Gascony) since 1354. In 1363 the Navarrese used the captivity of John II of France in London and the political weakness of the Dauphin to try to seize power. Although there was no formal treaty, Edward III of England supported the Navarrese moves, particularly as there was a prospect that he might gain control over the northern and western provinces as a consequence. There had been a peace treaty known as the Treaty of Brétigny in place between England and France since 1360. As England was supposed to be at peace with France the English military forces used to support Navarre were drawn from the mercenary routier companies, not the king of England's army, thus avoiding a breach of the peace treaty.

== Armies ==
The king of France's forces were led by Bertrand du Guesclin, though Jean, Count of Auxerre was the highest-ranking noble present. There were knights from Burgundy (f. e. Jean de Vienne), Breton, Picard, Parisian and Gascon people.

The forces of Navarre were commanded by the Gascon chief, Jean de Grailly, Captal de Buch and mainly consisted of 800 to 900 knights and 4,000 to 5,000 soldiers from Normandy, Gascony and England, including 300 English archers. The most expert, with the largest company of men at arms and archers in his train, was an English knight, called Sir John Jouel. Sir John Jouel commanded the first battalion of English, which consisted of men at arms and archers. The Captal de Buch had the second battalion, which, one with another, was about four hundred combatants. The English and Gascons consisted mainly of routier companies that had been operating in Brittany and Western France.

== Battle ==
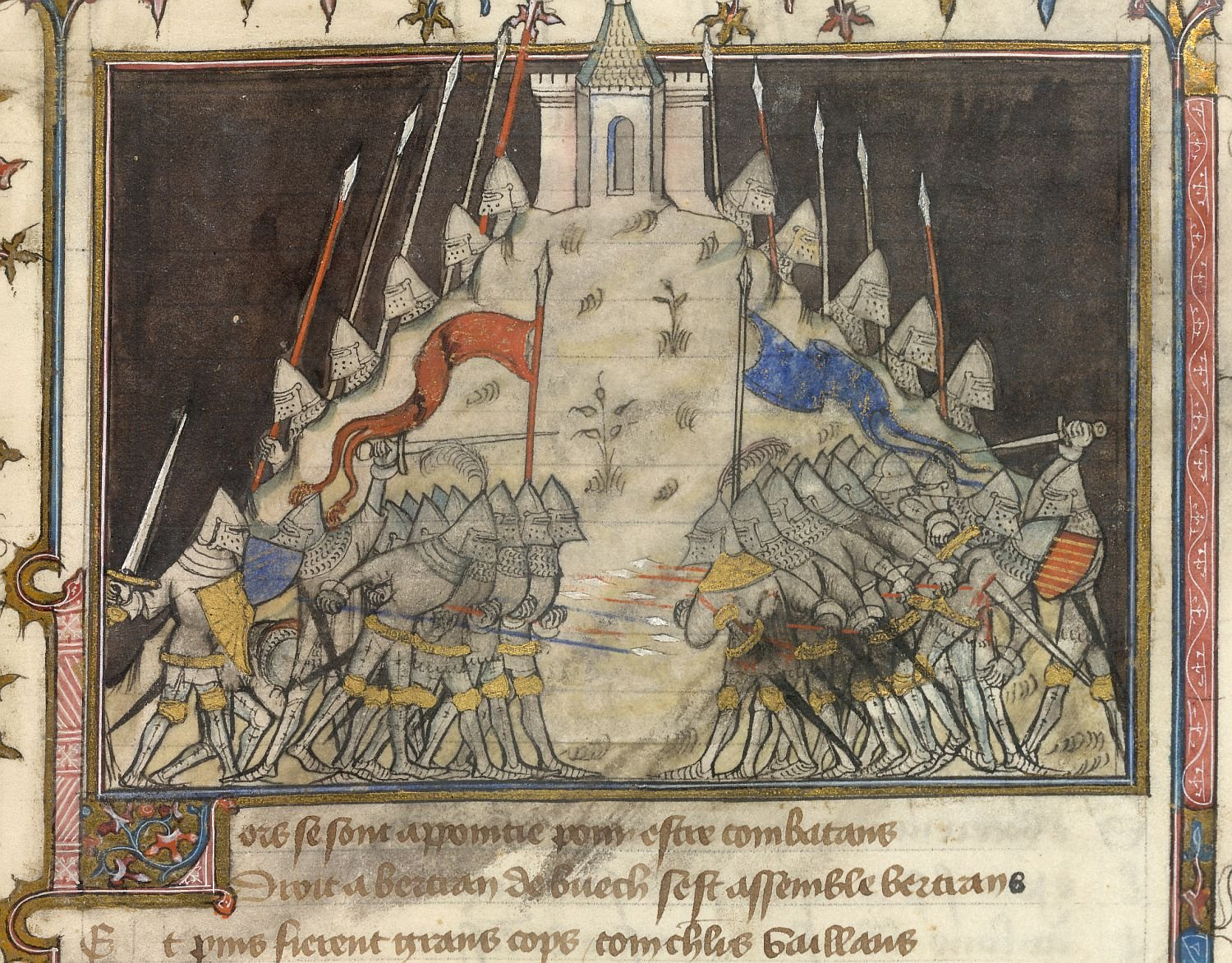
Battle of Cocherel (painting between c. 1380 and 1392)

The Anglo-Navarrese army was lined up in three battalions. It took up a defensive position, with the archers forming wedged divisions along the front, as had been a standard tactic for English armies of the period. In the past when the opposing army had advanced then they would be cut to pieces by the archers, however in this battle, du Guesclin managed to break the defensive formation by attacking and then pretending to retreat, which tempted Sir John Jouel and his battalion from their hill in pursuit. Captal de Buch and his company followed. A flank attack by du Guesclin's reserve then won the day.
