= Margaret, Countess of Comminges =

Margaret, Countess of Comminges (1366-1443), was a Countess regnant suo jure of Comminges in 1375–1443.

Daughter of her predecessor. She was the co-ruler of her husbands: John III, Count of Armagnac, John ΙΙ, Viscount of Fezensaguet (son of Geraud II, Viscount of Fezensaguet) and Mathieu of Foix. In 1443, Comminges was reunited to the French crown by King Charles VII of France.
