= Matthew, Count of Foix =

Count of Foix

Mathew of Foix
- Count of Foix
- Reign: 1391–1398
- Born: c. 1363 or after
- Died: August 1398
- Noble family: Foix
- Spouse: Joanna of Aragon
- Father: Roger-Bernard V of Foix, Viscount of Castelbon
- Mother: Gerauda of Navailles

Matthew (c. 1363 – August 1398) was a count of Foix and viscount of Béarn. He was son of Roger-Bernard V of Foix viscount of Castelbon and Géraude de Navailles. In 1391 he succeeded Gaston Phoebus, his first cousin once removed, as count. He asserted the sovereignty of Béarn and, as son-in-law of John I, contested the Crown of Aragon with John's brother Martin I from 1396. He and his wife, Joanna, had no children.

== Accession to office ==
Despite his pursuit for sovereignty, Gaston Phoebus ultimately bequeathed the lordship of Béarn to the king of France. On 8 August 1391, Béarnese leaders duly gathered in Orthez and designated representatives, establishing the Estates-General of Béarn.

They also elected Matthew de Castellbo as new legitimate lord of Béarn, also imposing on him the need to obtain from the king of France, Charles VI, the renunciation of the recent Treaty of Toulouse whereby the French monarch would gain access to the lordship of Béarn. Matthew manoeuvred quickly in this respect, obtaining early on his recognition by Richard II, king of England, and Charles VI, king of France, as lord of Béarn.

Matthew, Count of Foix House of Foix-Castelbón Cadet branch of the House of Foix Born: circa 1363 or after Died: August 1398
French nobility
Preceded by Gaston III (X)	Count of Foix; Viscount of Béarn; 1391–1398	Succeeded by Isabella & Archambaud
Preceded by Gerauda	Lord of Navailles and Sault; 1384–1398	Succeeded by Isabella & Archambaud
Preceded by Roger Bernard IV	Viscount of Castelbón; 1381–1398	Aragonese occupation
