= Jean III de Grailly =

Military leader in the Hundred Years' War

Jean III de Grailly KG
- Captal de Buch
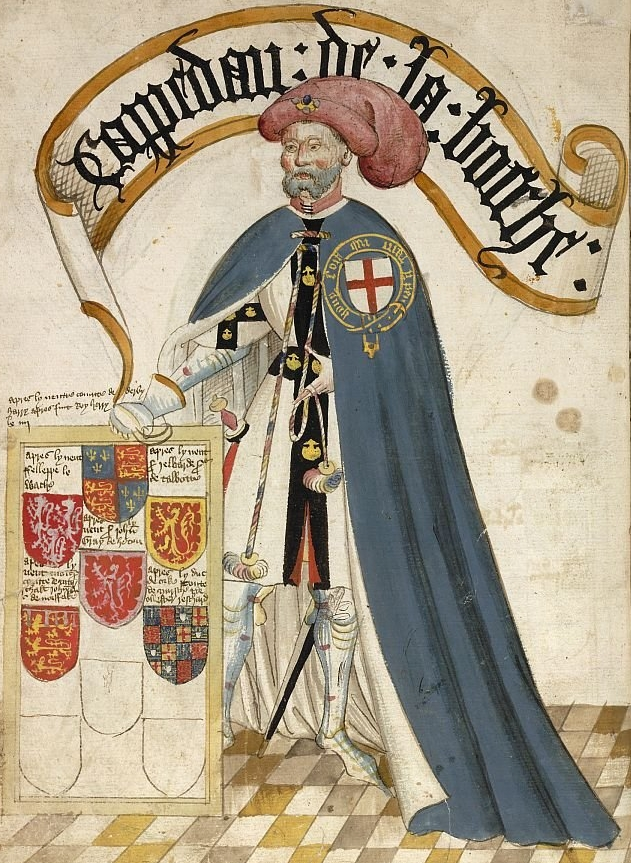
- Jean III de Grailly, Captal de Buch, KG, illustration from the Bruges Garter Book, c.1430
- Died: 7 September 1376; Paris, Kingdom of France
- Spouse: Rose d'Albret
- Father: Jean II De Grailly
- Mother: Blanch de Foix

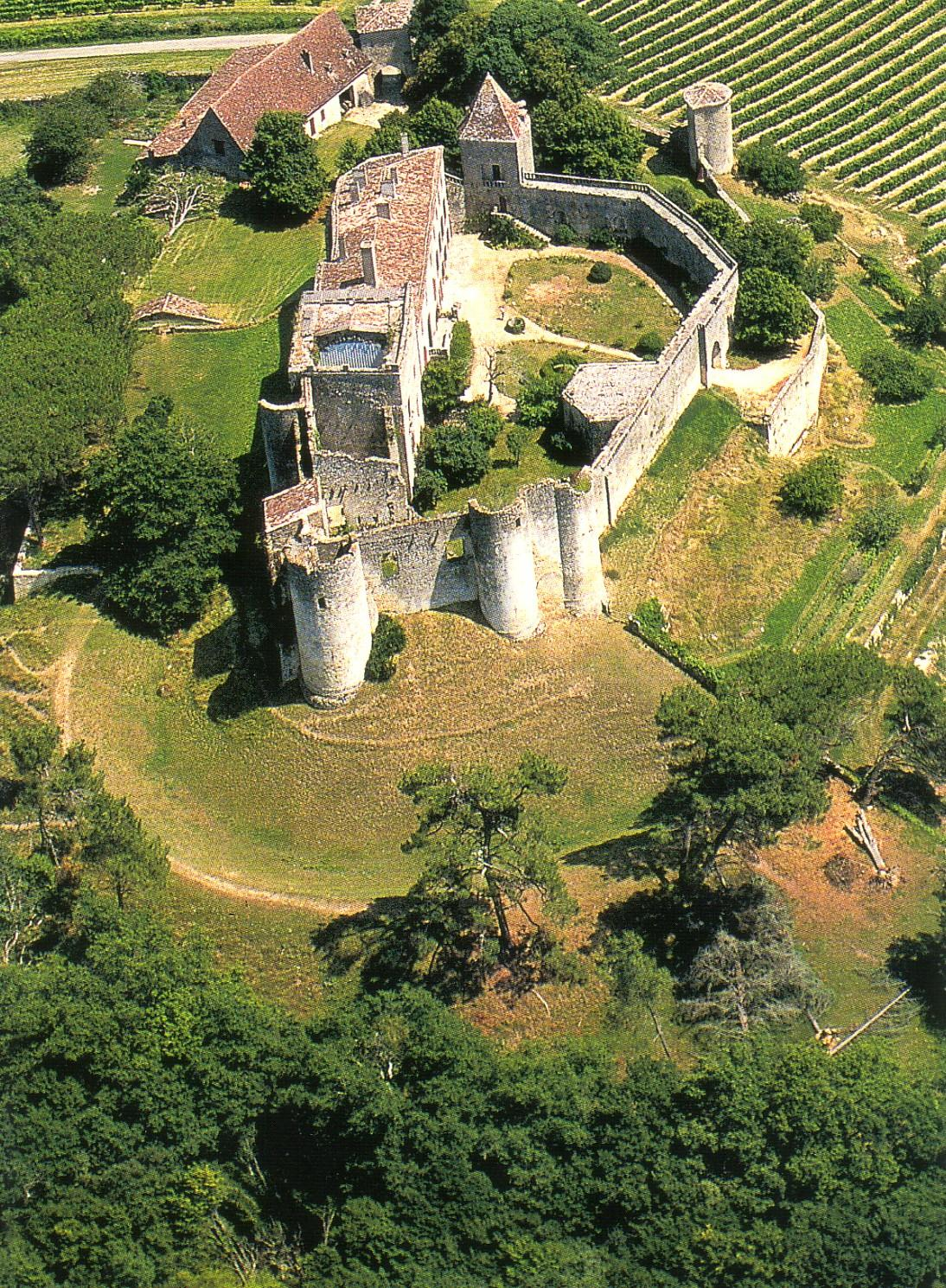
The castle of Benauges was hereditary in the Grailly family after having been granted to Jean I de Grailly in the early 1260s.

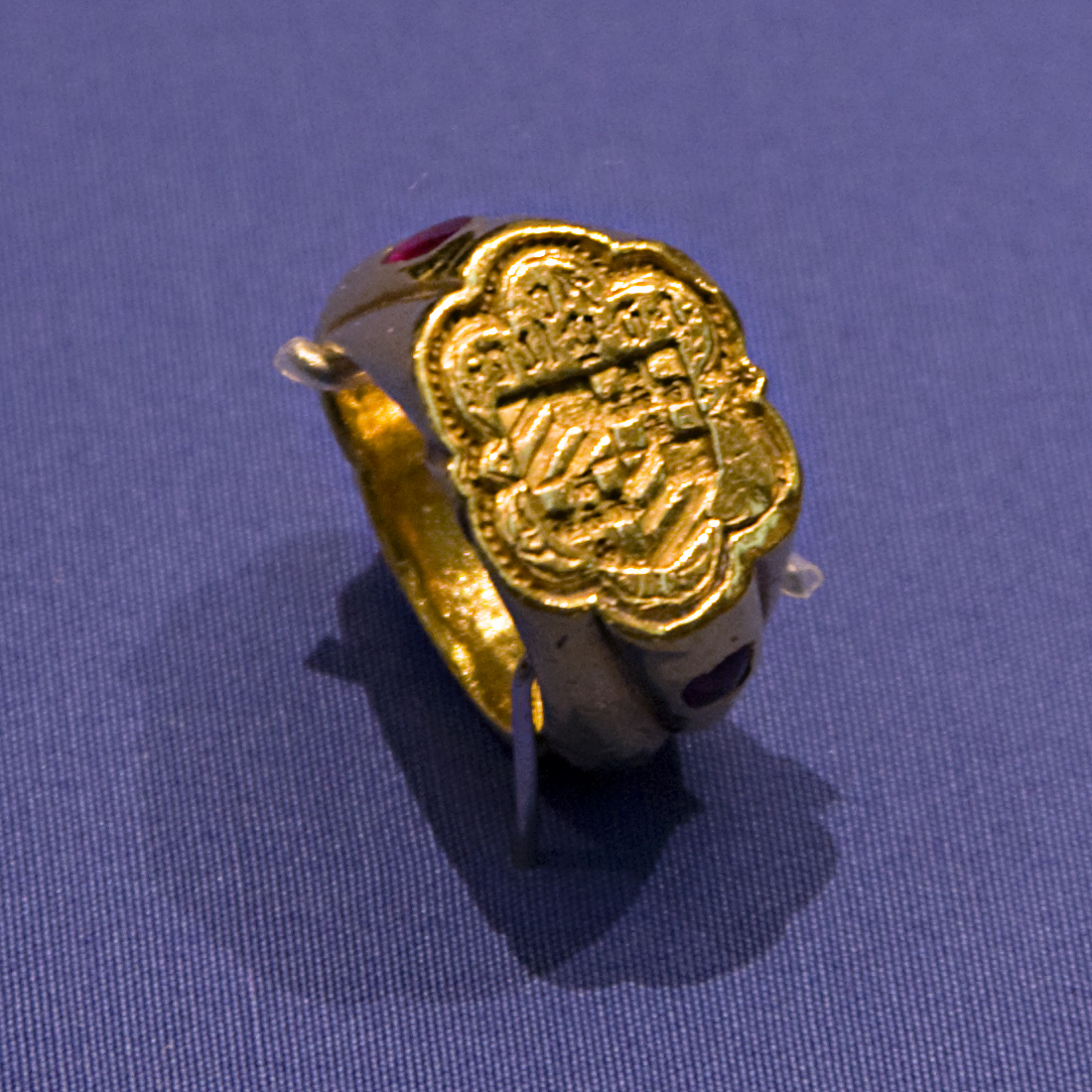
Gold signet ring belonging to Jean III de Grailly in the British Museum, late 14th century.

Jean III de Grailly (aka. John De Grailly, died 7 September 1376), Captal de Buch, KG, was a Gascon nobleman and a military leader in the Hundred Years' War, who was praised by the chronicler Jean Froissart as an ideal of chivalry.

== Biography ==
He was the son of Jean II de Grailly, Captal de Buch, Vicomte de Benauges, and of Blanch de Foix, a cousin of the counts of Foix.

Attached to the English side in the conflict, he was made Count of Bigorre by Edward III of England, and was also a founder and the fourth Knight of the Garter in 1348. He played a decisive role as a cavalry leader under Edward, the Black Prince in the Battle of Poitiers in 1356, with de Buch leading a flanking move against the French that resulted in the capture of the king of France, (John II), as well as many of his nobles. John was taken to London by the Black Prince and held to ransom.

Froissart gives an account of the Captal de Buch's chivalry and courage at the time of the peasant uprising in 1358 called the Jacquerie.

In 1364, he commanded the forces of Charles II of Navarre in Normandy, where he was defeated and captured by Bertrand du Guesclin at Cocherel. After his release the following year, he defected to the French side and was made lord of Nemours by Charles V of France. However, he soon reestablished his loyalty to the English, and in 1367 he went to Spain with the Black Prince, fighting at the Battle of Nájera. Here he again faced Bertrand du Guesclin, but this time it was du Guesclin who was captured, and the Captal was put in charge of the prisoner. He was rewarded for his service by being made the Constable of Aquitaine in 1371.

Again fighting for the English, he commanded an English relief force when the French attacked La Rochelle in 1372. While attempting to lift the siege of Soubise, his force was surprised by a French force led by Owain Lawgoch, a Welsh soldier of fortune in the French service. The Captal and Sir Thomas Percy, seneschal of Poitou, were captured.

Jean de Grailly was a prisoner of the French for the rest of his life at the Temple in Paris, because Charles V believed him too dangerous to ransom back to the English. He had refused his freedom as it would have meant taking up arms against the king of England, which he swore never to do. His personal allegiance to the Black Prince was so strong that, upon hearing of the prince's death, he lost all resolve, refused food and died a few days later in Paris.

Since he left no heirs from his marriage to Rose d' Albret, his uncle, Archambaud, Count of Foix and of Bigorre took the title Captal de Buch, which passed to his descendants the Counts of Foix.

Coat of arms of Jean III de Grailly
Notes The arms of Jean III de Grailly and his heirs consist of: Crest A man's head in profile with asses' ears Argent. Escutcheon Or, on a cross Sable five escallops Argent.
