= Jean I de Grailly =

13th-century French nobleman

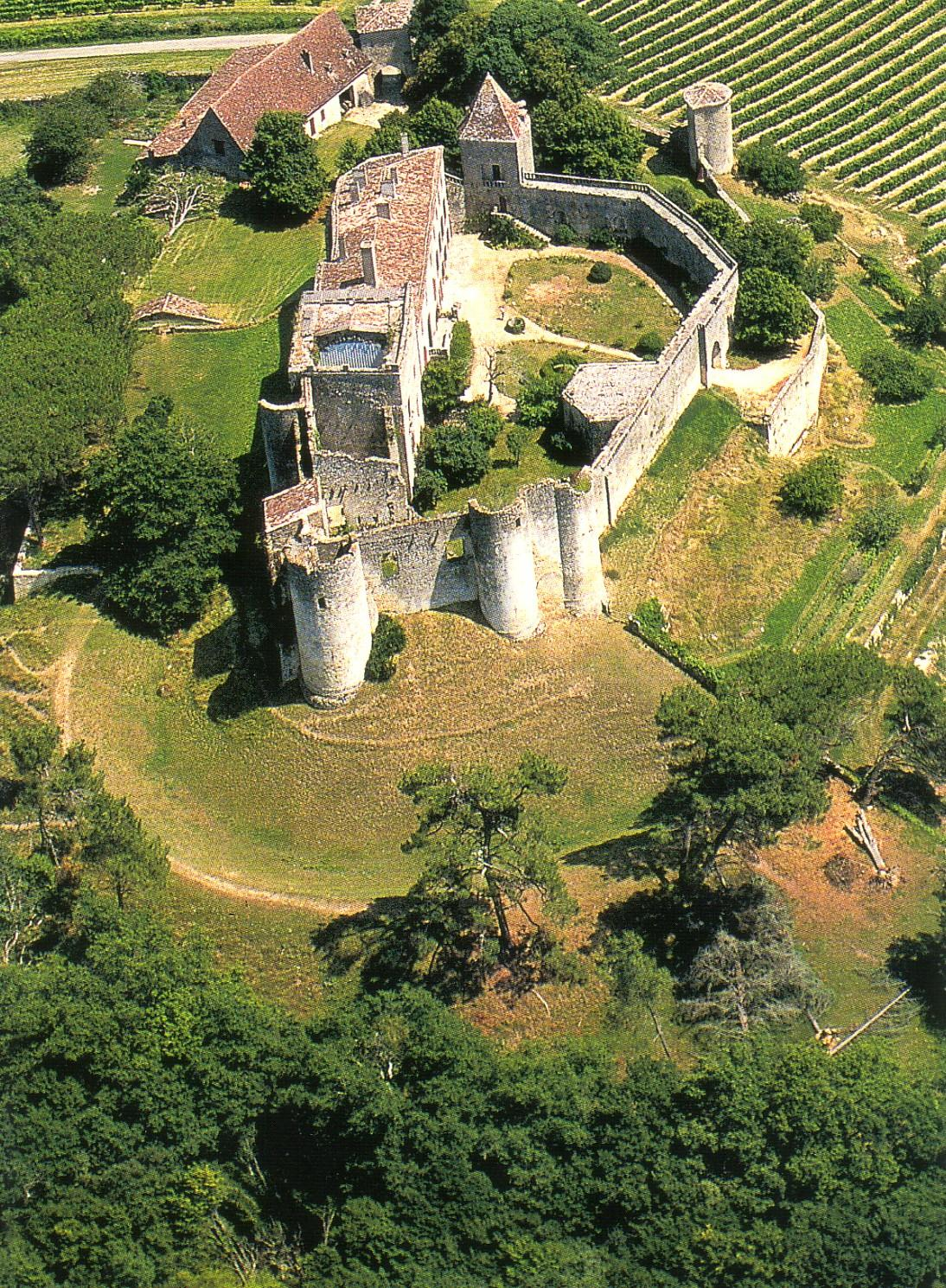
The castle of Benauge, which Jean acquired in 1266.

Jean I de Grailly (died c. 1301) was the seneschal of the Duchy of Gascony from 1266 to 1268, of the Kingdom of Jerusalem from about 1272 until about 1276, and of Gascony again from 1278 until 1286 or 1287.

== Early life ==
Jean was born on the shores of Lake Geneva in the County of Savoy. He probably travelled to England during the reign of Henry III of England in the entourage of Peter II of Savoy, who was uncle to Queen Eleanor of Provence. In 1262 he was already a knight in the household of Prince Edward, the king's heir and future King Edward I of England. In 1263 he had attained the status of a counsellor of the young prince. In 1266 he was rewarded for his services with the castle and viscounty of Benauges. He acquired the saltworks in Bordeaux and the right of toll at Pierrefite on the Dordogne as sources of income. He also received the lordship of Langon and was made seneschal of Prince Edward's fief of Gascony. In 1280 he founded the town of Cadillac to provide a port for Benauges.

== Ninth Crusade ==
In 1270 he accompanied Edward on the Ninth Crusade to Syria. He stayed behind in the Crusader kingdom as seneschal and only returned to Gascony sometime before or during 1276. He maintained an interest in the fate of Jerusalem for the remainder of his life, however. In October 1277 he was in England to warn now-king Edward of the conspiracy of the viscount of Castillon. In 1278 he was re-appointed to his old Gascon post.

== Europe ==
In 1279, Jean travelled to Amiens and to England to negotiate the Treaty of Amiens, which ended the state of war between Edward of England and Philip III of France and returned the Agenais to English control. Only two weeks after the treaty, Jean de Grailly encouraged an inquiry to determine whether or not he Quercy was English territory. He was already appointed to the commission to oversee the return of the Agenais and his seneschal's duties were extended to the new region. Edward also ordered Jean not to pay the fouage, a tax demanded by the French king. He was granted royal letters to demonstrate the king's intention to pay the tax in a few years, after better harvests. In 1285 he even negotiated a treaty fixing the tariff on Bordeaux wine.

Jean also had to negotiate with the French court in Paris concerning the dating clauses of Gascon charters. The mutually acceptable formula resulting was: actum fuit regnantibus Philippo regis Francie, Edwardo rege Anglie, duce Aquitanie. Jean travelled extensively, not only to Paris, but also to Fuenterrabia to negotiate with Alfonso X of Castile. On 2 January 1281 he was in Vienne to witness an accord between Philip I of Savoy and Robert II of Burgundy. Later that year he was dispatched to Mâcon to advise Margaret of Provence, the widow of Louis IX of France. Edward employed him extensively as his deputy in continental Europe.

Between 1280 and 1285 Grailly took part in the tortuous negotiations concerning the inheritance of the County of Bigorre after the death of the five-times married Countess Petronilla. Eventually it was determined that the proper heiress was Joanna I of Navarre. The question of homage and featly, however, was put off, as the Joanna and her husband, Philip the Fair, were both monarch and thus swore homage to none. Nonetheless the question of whether Bigorre was a feudatory of the Duke of Aquitaine or the King of France was to be an issue between the two monarch throughout the fourteenth century.

Jean de Grailly eventually fell short of funds for his activities, since his expenses need approval from the Exchequer before he could receive his salary. He took to exploitation and illegal exactions from the peasants, whose complaints eventually reached the ears of Edward I. He was removed from office sometime between June 1286 and Spring 1287, when the king and Queen Eleanor of Castile, present in Gascony, set up an inquiry into his actions. The commission found him to have misappropriated monies in several municipalities. He was ordered to repay them, but these payments could be made from outstanding funds owed him. He himself returned to Savoy and left his Gascon lands to his son Pierre.

== Last campaigns in the Levant ==
Jean went back to the Levant in the end of the 1280s. In 1289, he led a French regiment from Acre to the besieged city of Tripoli, until the Fall of Tripoli in April 1289. Following the fall of Tripoli, Jean was sent to Europe by king Henry of Cyprus to warn European monarchs about the critical situation in the Levant. Jean met with Pope Nicholas IV who shared his worries and wrote a letter to European potentates to do something about the Holy Land. Most however were too preoccupied by the Sicilian question to organize a Crusades, as was Edward I too entangled in troubles at home. Only a small army of peasant and unemployed townfolks from Tuscany and Lombardy could be raised. They were transported in 20 Venetians galleys. They were led by Nicholas Tiepolo, the son of the Doge Lorenzo Tiepolo, who was assisted by the returning Jean and Roux of Sully.

Jean was present as the Commander of the French king's troops at the fall of Acre. Wounded, he was rescued during one point of siege by his fellow Savoyard Otho de Grandison, once a faithful servant of Edward's as well, and escaped on ship to Cyprus. He returned afterwards to Savoy, where he died around 1301. His descendants continued to play a crucial role in Gascony over the next century.
