= Captal de Buch =

Medieval feudal title in France

Captal de Buch (later Buché; from Latin capitalis, "first", "chief") was a medieval feudal title in Gascony held by Jean III de Grailly among others.

According to Du Cange, the designation captal (capital, captau, capitau) was applied loosely to the more illustrious nobles of Aquitaine, counts, viscounts, &c., probably as capitales domini, "principal lords", though he quotes more fanciful explanations. As an actual title, the word was used only by the seigneurs of Trene, Puychagut, Epernon and Buch.

Buch was a strategically located town and port on the Atlantic, in the bay of Arcachon.

When Pierre, the seigneur of Grailly (c. 1285 – 1356) married Asalide (the captaline de Buch), the heiress of Pierre-Amanieu de Bordeaux, captal de Buch, in 1307, the title passed into the Grailly family, a line of fighting seigneurs with origins in Savoy. The last known person to assert the title was Frederic de Foix, Comte de Candale, d'Astarac and de Benauges, in the 16th century.

It is best known in connection with the soldier Jean III de Grailly, Captal de Buch (d. 1376), memorialized by Jean Froissart as the confidant of the Black Prince and a champion of the English cause against France in the 14th century.
