= Sophie Polyxena Concordia of Sayn-Wittgenstein-Hohenstein =

German countess (1709–1781)

- Fürstin of Nassau-Siegen
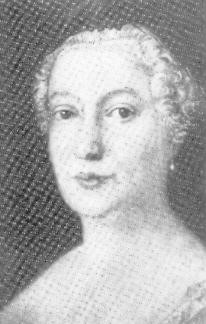
- Fürstin Sophie Polyxena Concordia of Nassau-Siegen, nee Countess of Sayn-Wittgenstein-Hohenstein. Detail of a anonymous portrait, 18th century. Siegerlandmuseum, Siegen.

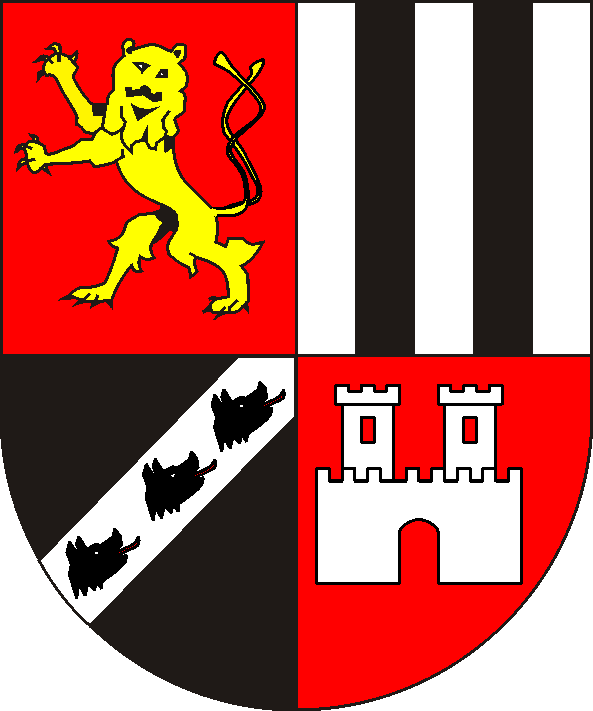
- Coat of arms
- Full name: Sophie Polyxena Concordia Countess of Sayn-Wittgenstein-Hohenstein
- Native name: Sophia Polyxena Concordia Gräfin zu Sayn-Wittgenstein-Hohenstein
- Born: Sophia Polyxena Concordia Gräfin zu Sayn, Wittgenstein und Hohenstein, Frau zu Homburg, Vallendar, Neumagen, Lohra und Klettenberg; 28 May 1709; Berlin
- Baptised: 11 June 1709; Berlin
- Died: 15 December 1781 (aged 72); Untere Schloss, Siegen
- Buried: 23 December 1781; Fürstengruft, Siegen
- Noble family: House of Sayn-Wittgenstein-Hohenstein
- Spouse: Frederick William II of Nassau-Siegen
- Issue Detail: Charlotte Sophia Louise; Mary Eleonore Concordia; Anne Charlotte Augusta
- Father: August of Sayn-Wittgenstein-Hohenstein
- Mother: Concordia of Sayn-Wittgenstein-Hohenstein

Countess Sophie Polyxena Concordia of Sayn-Wittgenstein-Hohenstein (Note: Dek (1970), p. 99 mentions only the name Sayn-Wittgenstein.) (28 May 1709 – 15 December 1781), German: Sophia Polyxena Concordia Gräfin zu Sayn-Wittgenstein-Hohenstein, official titles: Gräfin zu Sayn, Wittgenstein und Hohenstein, Frau zu Homburg, Vallendar, Neumagen, Lohra und Klettenberg, was a countess from the House of Sayn-Wittgenstein-Hohenstein and through marriage Fürstin of Nassau-Siegen.

== Biography ==
Sophie Polyxena Concordia was born in Berlin on 28 May 1709 (Note: "See Archives of the princes of Sayn-Wittgenstein-Hohenstein, Wittgenstein Castle, Laasphe, notification dated Berlin 8‑6‑1709: «am 28ten Maii abends um 9 Uhr». The mother died on 4 June and the child was baptised on 11 June «à la maison» (baptismal register of Berlin Cathedral), which proves that the birth took place in Berlin.") as the second daughter of Count August of Sayn-Wittgenstein-Hohenstein and his first wife, Countess Concordia of Sayn-Wittgenstein-Hohenstein. Sophie Polyxena Concordia was baptised on 11 June in Berlin a week after the death of her mother. Her father was Oberhofmarschall at the court of King Frederick I of Prussia until 1710 and, for eight years (1702–1710), was a member of the Drei-Grafen-Kabinett with Minister President Johann Kasimir Kolb Graf von Wartenberg and Generalfeldmarschall Alexander Hermann Graf von Wartensleben.

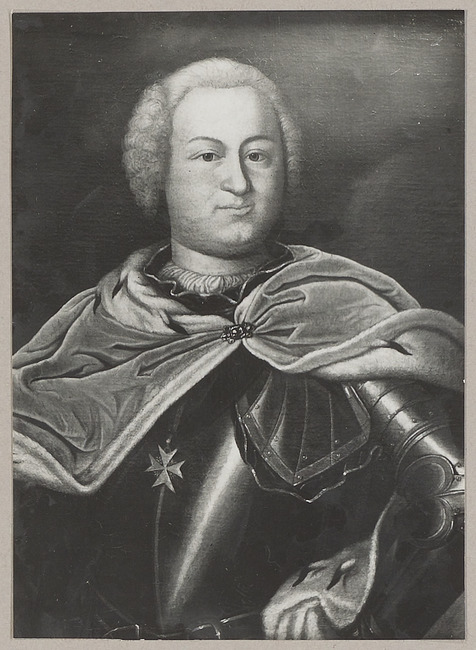
Fürst Frederick William II of Nassau-Siegen, the husband of Sophie Polyxena Concordia. Portrait by Franz Lippold, 1733. Siegerlandmuseum, Siegen.

Sophie Polyxena Concordia married at Ludwigseck Hunting Lodge near Feudingen on 23 September 1728 (Note: "See the registers of the Protestant court parish in Siegen: «1728 den 23 Sept. Nachts zwischen 11 und 12 Uhr sind auf dem Hochgräfl. Wittgensteinischen Jagdhauses Ludwigs-Eck … ehelich zusammen geworden der Durchl. Fürst und Herr Friedrich Wilhelm …». See State Archives Wiesbaden (170^{III}), notification dated 24‑9‑1728, Wittgenstein: «gestern auf meinem Jagdhaus Ludwigseck durch priesterliche Copulation vollzogen worden».") to Fürst Frederick William II of Nassau-Siegen (Nassauischer Hof, Siegen, 11 November 1706 (Note: "See Dek (1970), confirmed by State Archives Marburg (4f, Nassau-Siegen, Nr. 241 (2)), notification dated Siegen 11‑11‑1706: «heute früh gleich nach 9 Uhr».") – Nassauischer Hof, Siegen, 2 March 1734 (Note: "Europäische Stammtafeln incorrectly states that he died on 3‑3‑1734. Dek (1970) gives the same date and gives Siegen as place of death. In fact the prince died on 2‑3. See a) parish registers Siegen, b) State Archives Wiesbaden (130^{II} 2209), notification dated Siegen 3‑3‑1734: «gestern nachtmittags zwischen 1 u. 2 Uhr».")), the only son of Fürst Frederick William Adolf of Nassau-Siegen and his first wife, Landgravine Elisabeth Juliana Francisca of Hesse-Homburg.

Sophie Polyxena Concordia and Frederick William were related, Countess Elisabeth of Nassau-Siegen, the great-great-grandmother of Sophie Polyxena Concordia was an older half-sister of Count Henry of Nassau-Siegen, the great-grandfather of Frederick William.

On the death of his father in 1722, Frederick William succeeded his father as the territorial lord of the Protestant part of the Principality of Nassau-Siegen and co-ruler of the city of Siegen. He possessed the district of Siegen (with the exception of seven villages) and the districts of Hilchenbach and Freudenberg. He shared the city of Siegen with the Catholic Fürst of Nassau-Siegen. Frederick William also succeeded his father as count of Bronkhorst, lord of Wisch, Borculo, Lichtenvoorde and Wildenborch, and hereditary knight banneret of the Duchy of Guelders and the County of Zutphen. Finally, Frederick William succeeded his father in a part of the Principality of Nassau-Hadamar. But because he was still a minor, he was under the custody and regency of his stepmother Amalie Louise until 1727.

1733 was a sad year for the couple. In March, their youngest daughter died, and in November their second daughter. The following year, Frederick William died, aged 27. On 19 June Sophie Polyxena Concordia gave birth to her fifth daughter. Thus, there were no male heirs. Sophie Polyxena Concordia, the Dowager Fürstin, was compelled to accept that the Catholic Fürst, William Hyacinth, would take possession of the Reformed lands and the city of Siegen. However, the Fürsten Christian of Nassau-Dillenburg and William Charles Henry Friso of Nassau-Diez also laid claim to the inheritance. Their soldiers occupied the Nassauischer Hof in Siegen, while William Hyacinth was in Spain.

To drive out this occupation by Nassau-Dillenburg and Nassau-Diez, Elector Clemens August of Cologne called in the Landesausschuß in his countries bordering the Siegerland. On 20 August 1735, peasants from Cologne crossed the borders of the Principality of Nassau-Siegen and plundered "was ihnen vorkam" ("what was in front of them"). On 23 August, they were admitted to the (Catholic) castle and advanced with two to three thousand men to the (Reformed) Nassauischer Hof. But the armies of Nassau-Dillenburg and Nassau-Diez, united with the citizens of Siegen, forced the troops from Cologne to flee. Thus, the Reformed part of Siegerland remained under the rule of Nassau-Dillenburg and Nassau-Diez, and the Catholic part remained under the imperial administration.

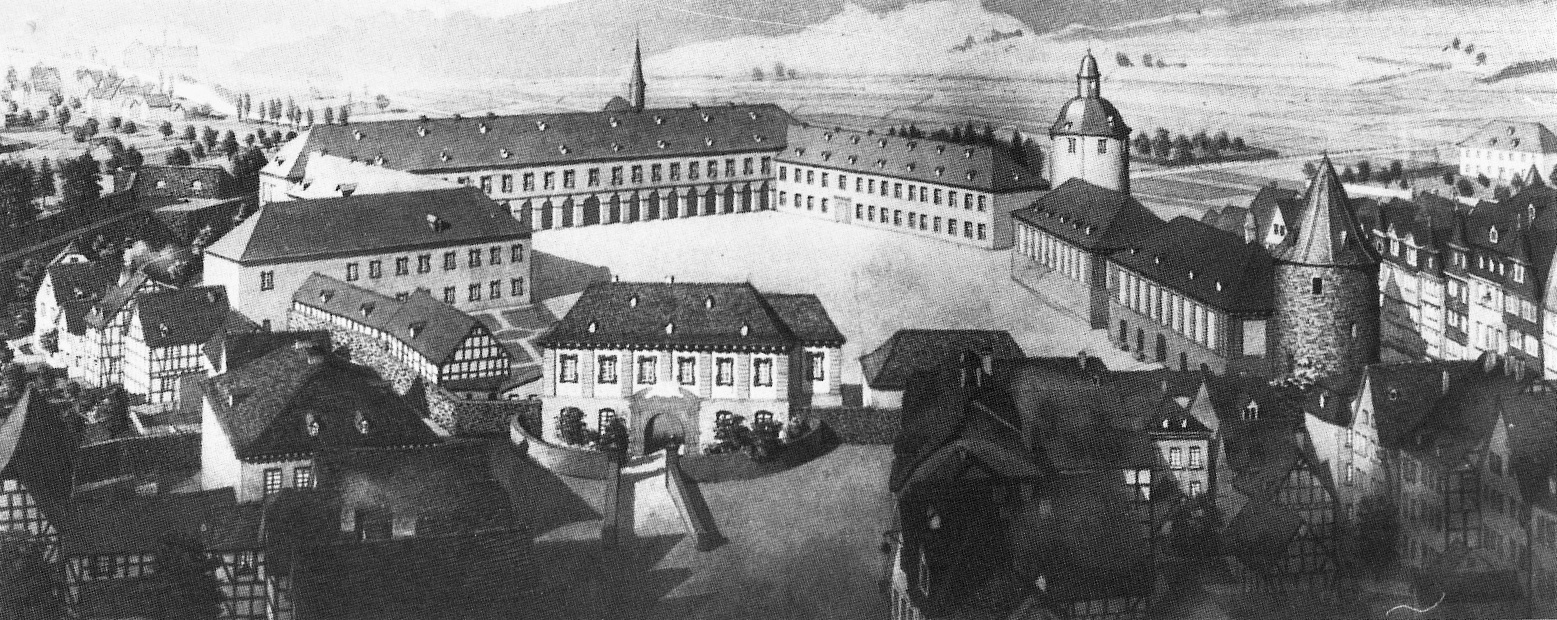
The Nassauischer Hof, later called Untere Schloss, seen from the west, ca. 1720. Attempt at reconstruction, ink drawing, Wilhelm Scheiner, 1922.

Even as a widow, Sophie Polyxena Concordia continued to live in the Nassauischer Hof, which since the mid-18th century has been called the Untere Schloss. The south wing of the palace is still called the Wittgensteiner Flügel after her. She organised the marriage of her brother Frederick to her sister-in-law Augusta Amalia in 1738 and, after the latter's death in 1742, to her youngest sister-in-law, Elisabeth Hedwig, in 1743. The last marriage she organised was that of her granddaughter, Countess Clementine of Bentheim-Steinfurt, to Count Ferdinand Casimir of Isenburg-Büdingen-Wächtersbach in 1775.

During the visits to his German lands in 1741 and 1742, Prince William IV of Orange-Nassau stayed with Sophie Polyxena Concordia and her mother-in-law Amalie Louise in the Nassauischer Hof in Siegen. In 1759, Sophie Polyxena Concordia lost her three living daughters, the eldest and the third died in April, and the youngest in June.

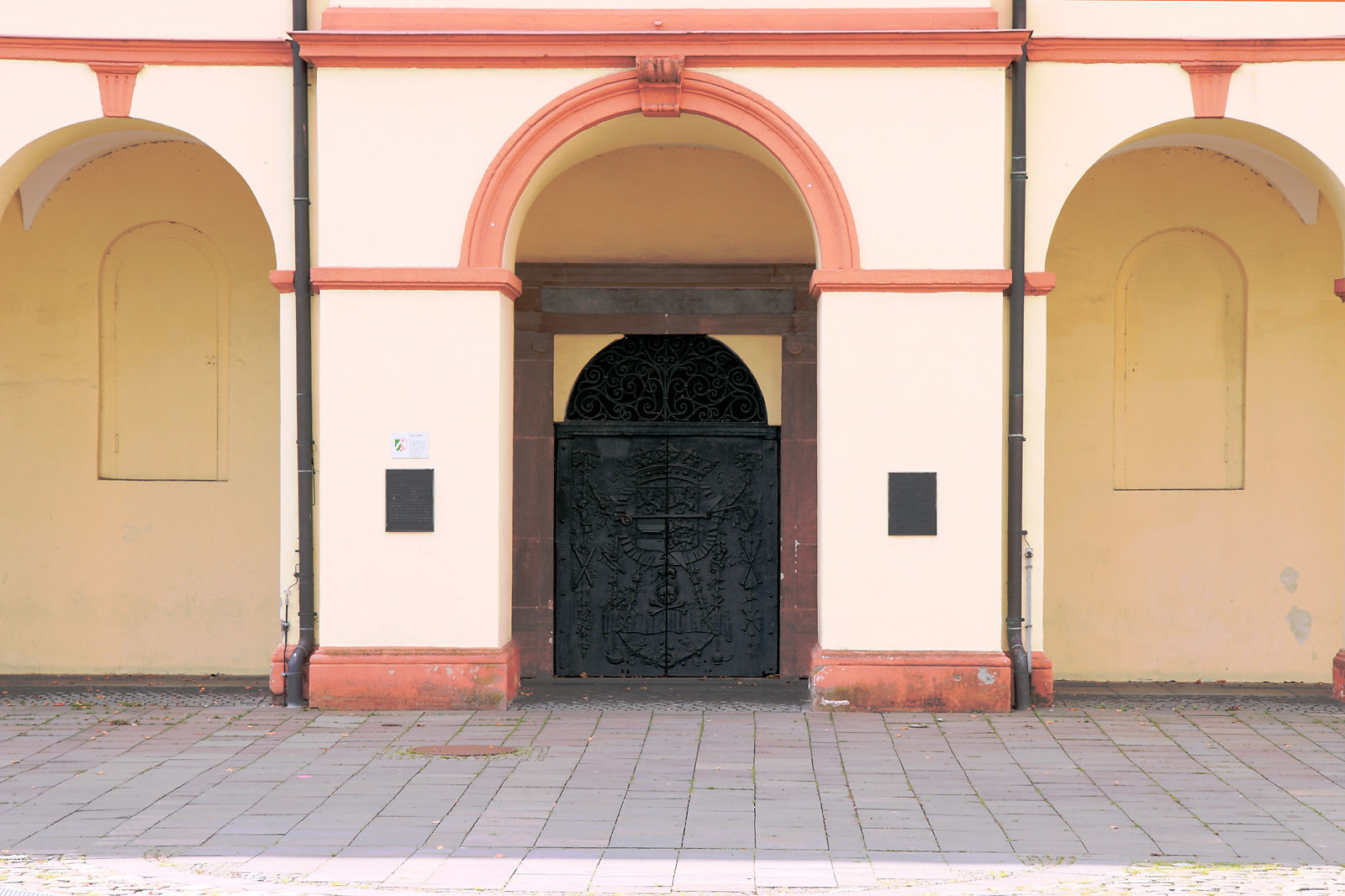
The entrance to the Fürstengruft in Siegen. Photo: Bob Ionescu, 2009.

Sophie Polyxena Concordia died at the Untere Schloss in Siegen on 15 December 1781 (Note: "See Dek (1970), confirmed by the parish registers, notifications and an article in the Dillenburgische Intelligenz Nachrichten, LI. Stück, Sonnabends, den 22 Decembris 1781: «Den 15ten dieses des Abends». Vorsterman van Oyen (1882) states she died in 1783.") and was buried on 23 December in the Fürstengruft there, as the last person to be buried in this burial vault.

When, during the renovation of the Fürstengruft in 1951, the marble slabs that had been placed in front of the niches in 1893 had to be reattached, it was possible to take a look inside the graves. It was discovered that many graves had already been opened. Behind the slabs were walls of field-baked bricks, some of which were loose and allowed a view into the interior of the niches. In the light of a strong flashlight one could see that on the coffin of Sophia Polyxena Concordia, the artistic bronze handles covered with patina were particularly striking.

== Issue ==
From the marriage of Sophie Polyxena Concordia and Frederick William the following children were born:

1. Charlotte Sophia Louise (Note: Huberty, et al. (1981), p. 388 names her Charlotte Sophie. The given name Charlotte Sophia Louise in Dek (1970), p. 98 and Vorsterman van Oyen (1882), p. 130.) (Siegen, 6 June 1729 – Burgsteinfurt, 2 April 1759), married in Siegen on 30 September 1748 to Count Charles Peter Ernest of Bentheim-Steinfurt (Burgsteinfurt, 30 August 1729 – Burgsteinfurt, 30 June 1780).
2. Frederica Wilhelmine Polyxena (Nassauischer Hof, Siegen, 3 April 1730 – Wittgenstein Castle, Laasphe, 18 November 1733).
3. Mary Eleonore Concordia (Siegen, 2 March 1731 – Kamen, 20 April 1759).
4. Frederica Augusta Sophia (Nassauischer Hof, Siegen, 1 June 1732 – Nassauischer Hof, Siegen, 23 March 1733).
5. Anne Charlotte Augusta (Note: Given name according to Menk (2004), p. 201 and Huberty, et al. (1981), p. 388. Huberty, et al. (1981), p. 406 mentions that this given name appears in the baptismal certificate. The given name Catharina Anna (Charlotte Augusta) in Dek (1970), p. 98 and Lück & Wunderlich (1956), p. 35. The given name Catharina Anna in Vorsterman van Oyen (1882), p. 130, who mentions in a footnote that she also appears as Anna Charlotte Augusta.) (Nassauischer Hof, Siegen, 19 June 1734 – Untere Schloss, Siegen, 9 June 1759).

== Ancestors ==
Ancestors of Sophie Polyxena Concordia of Sayn-Wittgenstein-Hohenstein
Great-great-grandparents	Louis II of Sayn-Wittgenstein-Wittgenstein (1571–1634) ⚭ 1598; Juliane of Solms-Braunfels (1578–1630)	Christian of Waldeck-Wildungen (1585–1637) ⚭ 1604; Elisabeth of Nassau-Siegen (1584–1661)	Élie de la Place (?–1627) ⚭ Claude de Bontillac (?–1596)	Floris van Brederode (1549–1599) ⚭ 1593; Theodora van Haaften (1570–1625)	Louis II of Sayn-Wittgenstein-Wittgenstein (1571–1634) ⚭ 1598; Juliane of Solms-Braunfels (1578–1630)	Christian of Waldeck-Wildungen (1585–1637) ⚭ 1604; Elisabeth of Nassau-Siegen (1584–1661)	John Philip II of Leiningen-Dagsburg-Hartenburg (1588–1643) ⚭ 1620; Elisabeth of Leiningen-Dagsburg-Falkenburg (1586–1623)	Christian of Waldeck-Wildungen (1585–1637) ⚭ 1604; Elisabeth of Nassau-Siegen (1584–1661)
Great-grandparents	John VIII of Sayn-Wittgenstein-Hohenstein (1601–1657) ⚭ 1627; Anne Augusta of Waldeck-Wildungen (1608–1658)		François de la Place (1590–1660) ⚭ 1625; Anna Margaretha van Brederode (1595–1650)		John VIII of Sayn-Wittgenstein-Hohenstein (1601–1657) ⚭ 1627; Anne Augusta of Waldeck-Wildungen (1608–1658)		Frederick Emich of Leiningen-Dagsburg-Hartenburg (1621–1698) ⚭ 1644; Sibylle of Waldeck-Wildungen (1619–1678)	
Grandparents	Gustavus of Sayn-Wittgenstein-Hohenstein (1633–1701) ⚭ 1657; Anna Helene de la Place (1634–1705)				Frederick William of Sayn-Wittgenstein-Hohenstein (1647–1685) ⚭ 1671; Charlotte Louise of Leiningen-Dagsburg-Hartenburg (1652–1713)			
Parents	August of Sayn-Wittgenstein-Hohenstein (1663–1735) ⚭ 1703; Concordia of Sayn-Wittgenstein-Hohenstein (1679–1709)							

== Sources ==
- Aßmann, Helmut & Menk, Friedhelm (1996). Auf den Spuren von Nassau und Oranien in Siegen (in German). Siegen: Gesellschaft für Stadtmarketing Siegen e.V.
- Behr, Kamill (1854). Genealogie der in Europa regierenden Fürstenhäuser (in German). Leipzig: Verlag von Bernhard Tauchnitz.
- Dek, A.W.E. (1970). Genealogie van het Vorstenhuis Nassau (in Dutch). Zaltbommel: Europese Bibliotheek.
- Droysen, Johann Gustav (2001) [1872]. Friedrich I. König von Preußen (in German) (3rd ed.). Berlin/New York: Walter de Gruyter. ISBN 3-11-017019-1.
- von Ehrenkrook, Hans Friedrich; Förster, Karl & Marchtaler, Kurt Erhard (1928). Ahnenreihen aus allen deutschen Gauen. Beilage zum Archiv für Sippenforschung und allen verwandten Gebieten (in German). Görlitz: Verlag für Sippenforschung und Wappenkunde C.A. Starke.
- Huberty, Michel; Giraud, Alain & Magdelaine, F. & B. (1981). l'Allemagne Dynastique (in French). Vol. Tome III: Brunswick-Nassau-Schwarzbourg. Le Perreux: Alain Giraud.
- Lück, Alfred (1981) [1967]. Siegerland und Nederland (in German) (2nd ed.). Siegen: Siegerländer Heimatverein e.V.
- Lück, Alfred & Wunderlich, Hermann (1956) [1952]. Die Fürstengruft zu Siegen (in German). Siegen: Verkehrsverein Siegen e.V.
- Menk, Friedhelm (1971). Quellen zur Geschichte des Siegerlandes im niederländischen königlichen Hausarchiv (in German). Siegen: Stadt Siegen/Forschungsstelle Siegerland.
- Menk, Friedhelm (2004). "Die Fürstengruft zu Siegen und die darin von 1669 bis 1781 erfolgten Beisetzungen". In Burwitz, Ludwig; Menk, Friedhelm; Opfermann, Ulrich Friedrich; Pfau, Dieter & Plaum, Bernd D. (eds.). Siegener Beiträge. Jahrbuch für regionale Geschichte (in German). Vol. 9. Siegen: Geschichtswerkstatt Siegen – Arbeitskreis für Regionalgeschichte e.V. pp. 183–202. ISSN 1431-6684.
- Vorsterman van Oyen, A.A. (1882). Het vorstenhuis Oranje-Nassau. Van de vroegste tijden tot heden (in Dutch). Leiden/Utrecht: A.W. Sijthoff/J.L. Beijers.

Sophie Polyxena Concordia of Sayn-Wittgenstein-Hohenstein House of Sayn-Wittgenstein-Hohenstein Born: 28 May 1709 Died: 15 December 1781
Regnal titles
Vacant Title last held by Amalie Louise of Courland	Fürstin of Nassau-Siegen (Protestant branch); 23 September 1728 – 2 March 1734	Death of husband, male lineage became extinct
