= Frederick William II of Nassau-Siegen =

German reigning prince (1706–1734)

Frederick William II, Prince of Nassau-Siegen
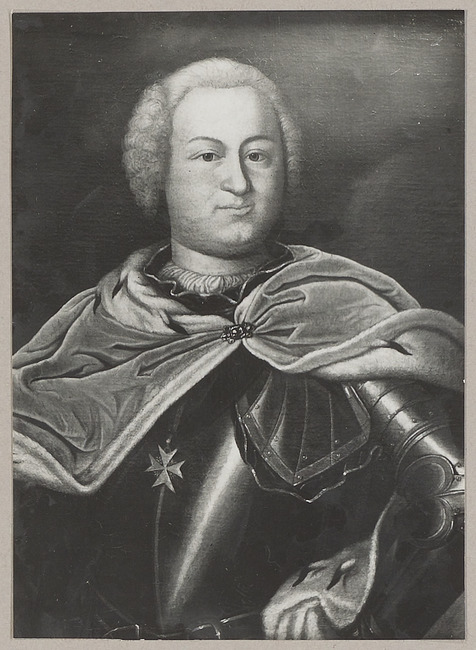
- Portrait by Franz Lippold, 1733. Siegerlandmuseum, Siegen.

Fürst of Nassau-Siegen
- Coat of arms
- Reign: 1722–1734
- Predecessor: Frederick William Adolf
- Successor: Christian of Nassau-Dillenburg; William Charles Henry Friso of Nassau-Diez
- Full name: Frederick William II Prince of Nassau-Siegen
- Native name: Friedrich Wilhelm II Fürst von Nassau-Siegen
- Born: Friedrich Wilhelm Prinz von Nassau, Graf zu Katzenelnbogen, Vianden, Diez, Limburg und Bronkhorst, Herr zu Beilstein, Stirum, Wisch, Borculo, Lichtenvoorde und Wildenborch, Erbbannerherr des Herzogtums Geldern und der Grafschaft Zutphen; 11 November 1706; Nassauischer Hof, Siegen
- Baptised: 18 November 1706; Siegen
- Died: 2 March 1734 (aged 27); Nassauischer Hof, Siegen
- Buried: 17 April 1734; Fürstengruft, Siegen
- Noble family: House of Nassau-Siegen
- Spouse: Sophie Polyxena Concordia of Sayn-Wittgenstein-Hohenstein
- Issue Detail: 5 daughters
- Father: Frederick William Adolf of Nassau-Siegen
- Mother: Elisabeth Juliana Francisca of Hesse-Homburg
- Occupation: Ritmeester in the Dutch States Army 1723, colonel of a regiment infantry 1728

Prince Frederick William II of Nassau-Siegen (11 November 1706 – 2 March 1734), German: Friedrich Wilhelm II. Fürst von Nassau-Siegen, official titles: Fürst zu Nassau, Graf zu Katzenelnbogen, Vianden, Diez, Limburg und Bronkhorst, Herr zu Beilstein, Stirum, Wisch, Borculo, Lichtenvoorde und Wildenborch, Erbbannerherr des Herzogtums Geldern und der Grafschaft Zutphen, was since 1722 Fürst of Nassau-Siegen, a part of the County of Nassau. He descended from the House of Nassau-Siegen, a cadet branch of the Ottonian Line of the House of Nassau. He was the last male representative of his lineage, with him the Protestant line of the House of Nassau-Siegen became extinct.

== Biography ==
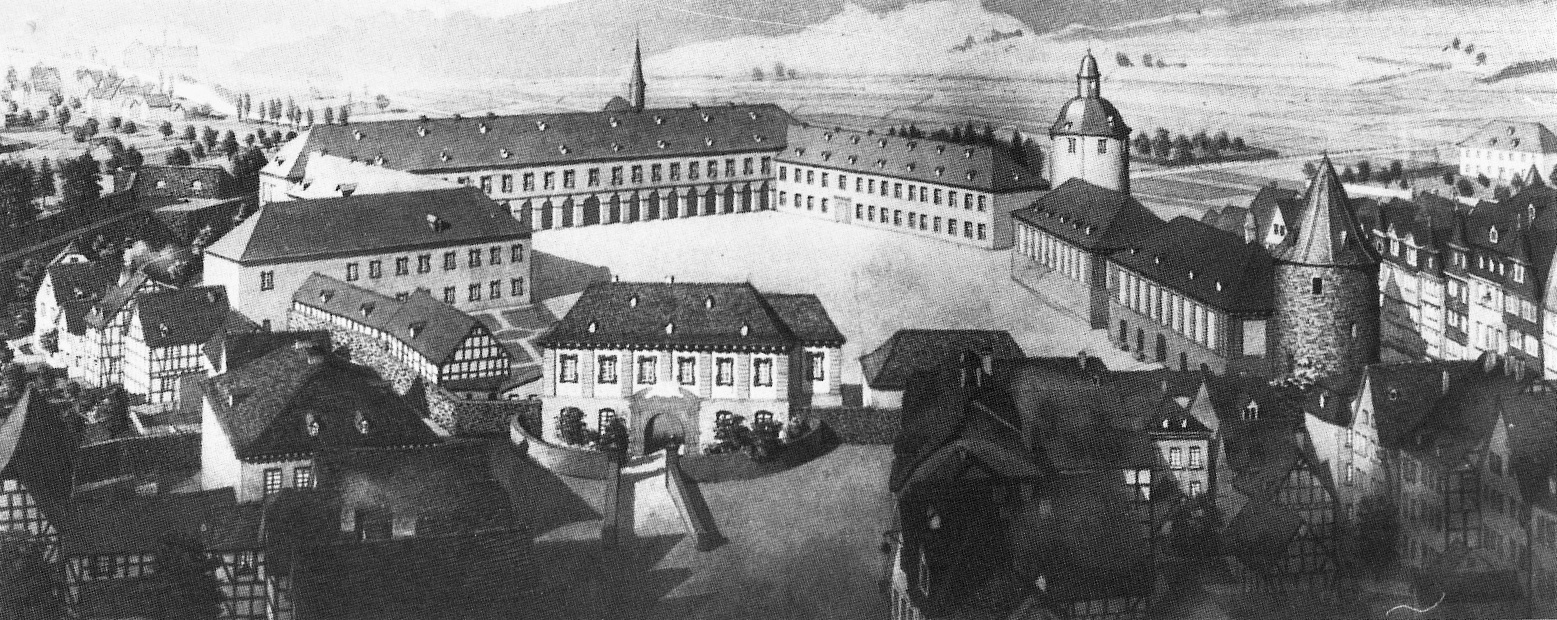
The Nassauischer Hof, later called Untere Schloss, seen from the west, ca. 1720. Attempt at reconstruction, ink drawing, Wilhelm Scheiner, 1922.

Frederick William was born in the Nassauischer Hof in Siegen on 11 November 1706 (Note: "See Dek (1970), confirmed by State Archives Marburg (4f, Nassau-Siegen, Nr. 241 (2)), notification dated Siegen 11‑11‑1706: «heute früh gleich nach 9 Uhr».") as the only son of Fürst Frederick William Adolf of Nassau-Siegen and his first wife Landgravine Elisabeth Juliana Francisca of Hesse-Homburg. He was baptised in Siegen on 18 November. His mother died just one year after his birth.

In October 1712, Frederick William Adolf and William Hyacinth, the Catholic Fürst of Nassau-Siegen, reached an agreement about their share in the city of Siegen. William Hyacinth ceded the Catholic land to Frederick William Adolf in exchange for an annual pension of 12,000 Reichsthalers. There was even an intention to marry off Frederick William, the Reformed Hereditary Prince, to Maria Anna Josepha, William Hyacinth's underage daughter. All this was done not in the least to get rid of the troublesome foreign administration. Since April 1707, the Catholic part of the Principality of Nassau-Siegen had, by order of the Aulic Council, been under the administration of the cathedral chapter in Cologne, due to the maladministration of William Hyacinth (because the Archbishop of Cologne, Joseph Clemens of Bavaria, was in imperial ban at the time, the cathedral chapter governed the Archdiocese of Cologne).

On the death of his father in 1722, Frederick William succeeded his father as the territorial lord of the Protestant part of the Principality of Nassau-Siegen and co-ruler of the city of Siegen. He possessed the district of Siegen (with the exception of seven villages) and the districts of Hilchenbach and Freudenberg. He shared the city of Siegen with his second cousin, William Hyacinth, the Catholic Fürst of Nassau-Siegen. Frederick William also succeeded his father as count of Bronkhorst, lord of Wisch, Borculo, Lichtenvoorde and Wildenborch, and hereditary knight banneret of the Duchy of Guelders and the County of Zutphen. Finally, Frederick William succeeded his father in a part of the Principality of Nassau-Hadamar. Due to he was still a minor, he was under the custody and regency of his stepmother Amalie Louise of Courland until 1727.

Frederick William became a ritmeester in the Dutch States Army on 23 November 1723, and colonel of a regiment infantry on 22 July 1728. And in 1731 he became a knight of the Order of Saint John (Bailiwick of Brandenburg, Saxony, Pomerania and Wendland) in Sonnenburg.

Frederick William died in the Nassauischer Hof in Siegen on 2 March 1734, (Note: "Europäische Stammtafeln incorrectly states that he died on 3‑3‑1734. Dek (1970) gives the same date and gives Siegen as place of death. In fact the prince died on 2‑3. See a) parish registers Siegen, b) State Archives Wiesbaden (130^{II} 2209), notification dated Siegen 3‑3‑1734: «gestern nachtmittags zwischen 1 u. 2 Uhr».") he was only 27 years old. He was buried on 17 April in the Fürstengruft there.

On 19 June, his widow Sophie Polyxena Concordia of Sayn-Wittgenstein-Hohenstein gave birth to the fifth daughter. Thus, there were no male heirs and the Dowager Fürstin was compelled to accept that the Catholic Fürst William Hyacinth would take possession of the Reformed lands and the city of Siegen. However, the Fürsten Christian of Nassau-Dillenburg and William Charles Henry Friso of Nassau-Diez also laid claim to the inheritance. Their soldiers occupied the Nassauischer Hof in Siegen, while William Hyacinth was in Spain.

In order to drive out this occupation by Nassau-Dillenburg and Nassau-Diez, Elector Clemens August of Cologne called in the Landesausschuß in his countries bordering the Siegerland. On 20 August 1735, peasants from Cologne crossed the borders of the Principality of Nassau-Siegen and plundered "was ihnen vorkam" ("what was in front of them"). On 23 August they were admitted to the (Catholic) castle and advanced with two to three thousand men to the (Reformed) Nassauischer Hof. But the armies of Nassau-Dillenburg and Nassau-Diez, united with the citizens of Siegen, forced the troops from Cologne to flee. Thus, the Reformed part of Siegerland remained under the rule of Nassau-Dillenburg and Nassau-Diez, and the Catholic part remained under the imperial administration.

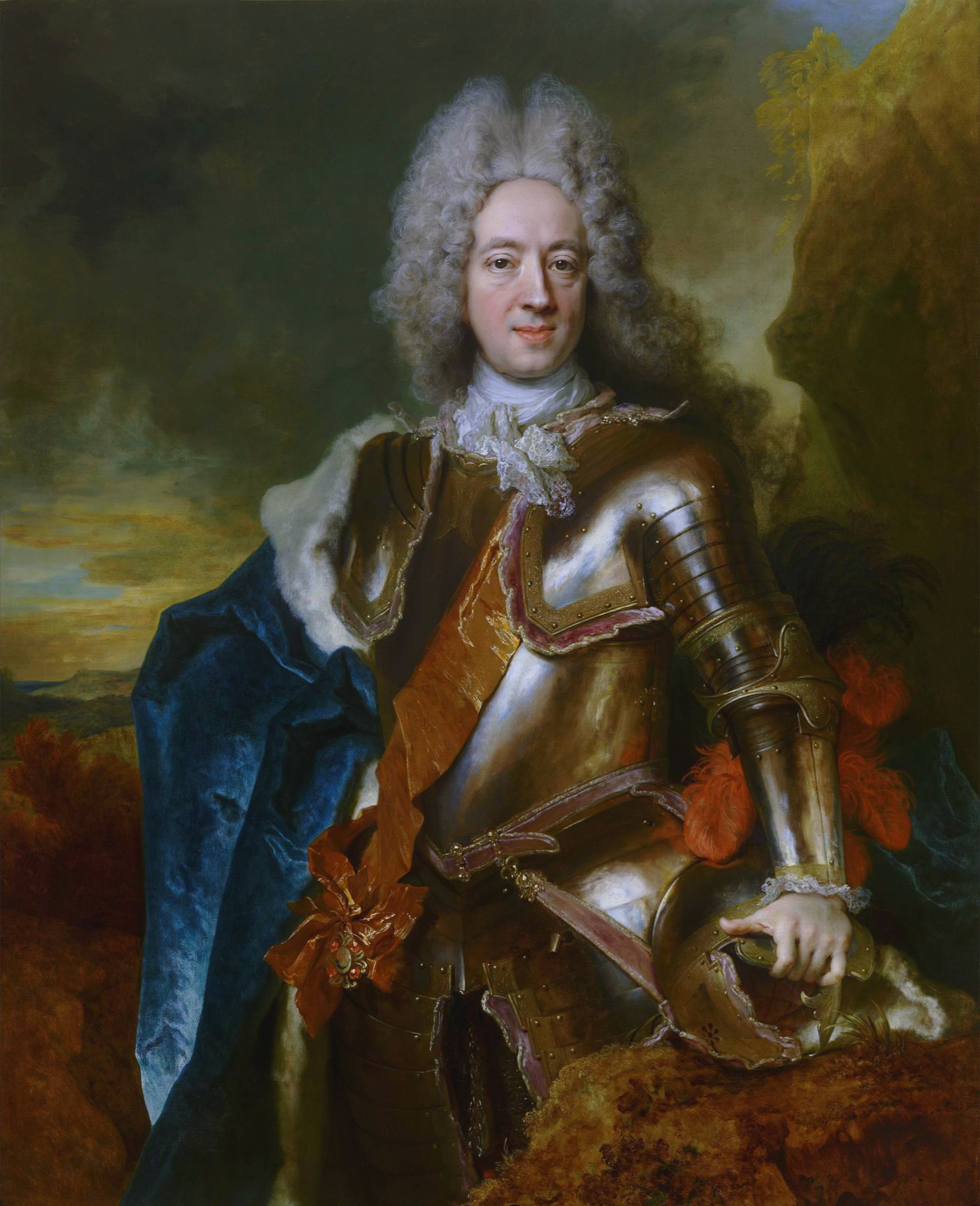
Fürst William Hyacinth of Nassau-Siegen. Portrait by Nicolas de Largillière, 18th century. Mauritshuis, The Hague.

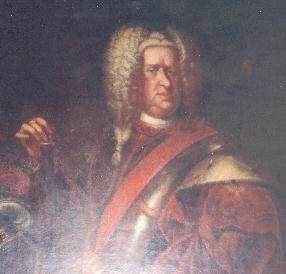
Fürst Christian of Nassau-Dillenburg. Anonymous portrait. Townhall, Herborn.

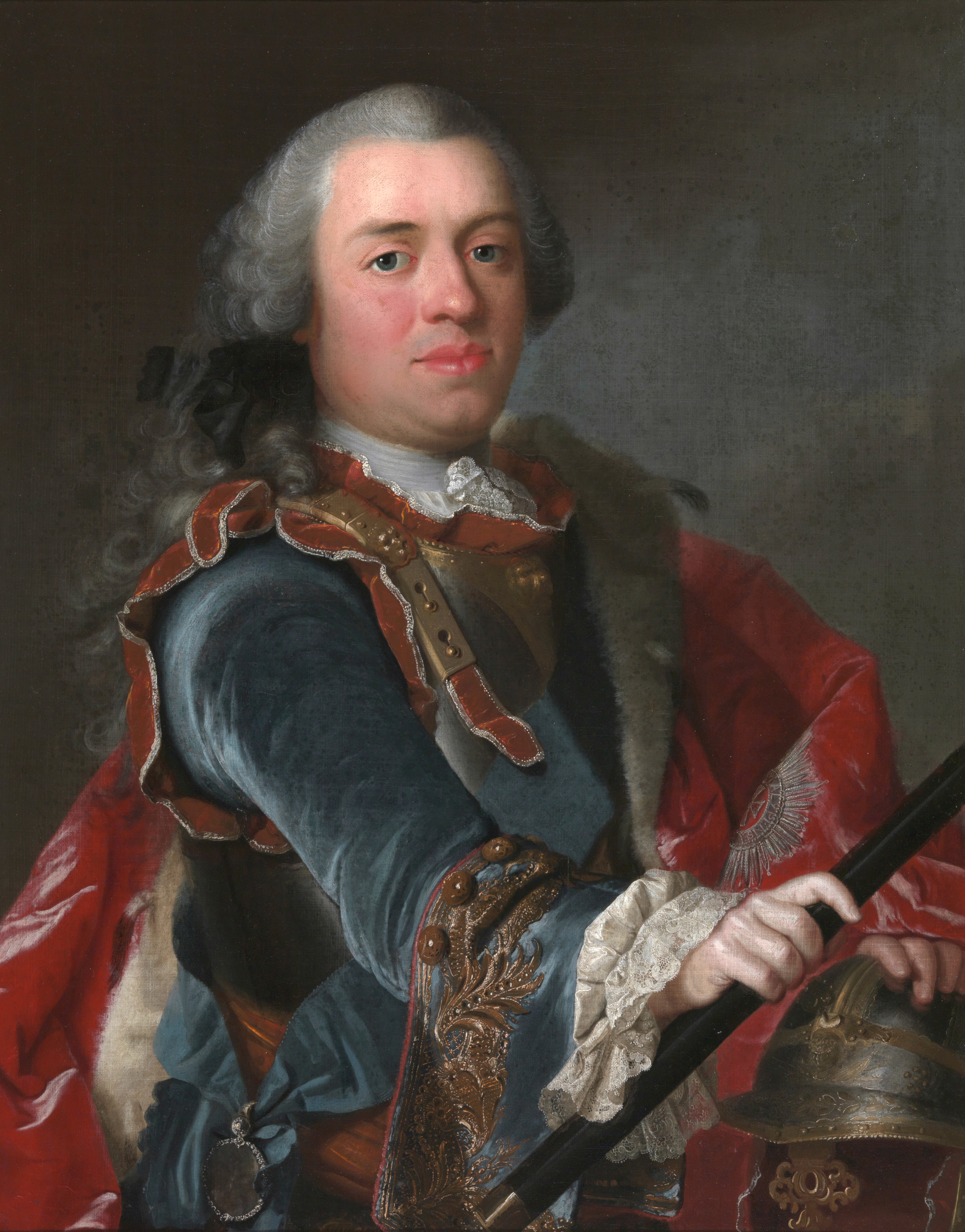
Prince William IV of Orange, Fürst of Nassau-Diez. Portrait attributed to Johann Valentin Tischbein, 1751. Het Loo Palace, Apeldoorn.

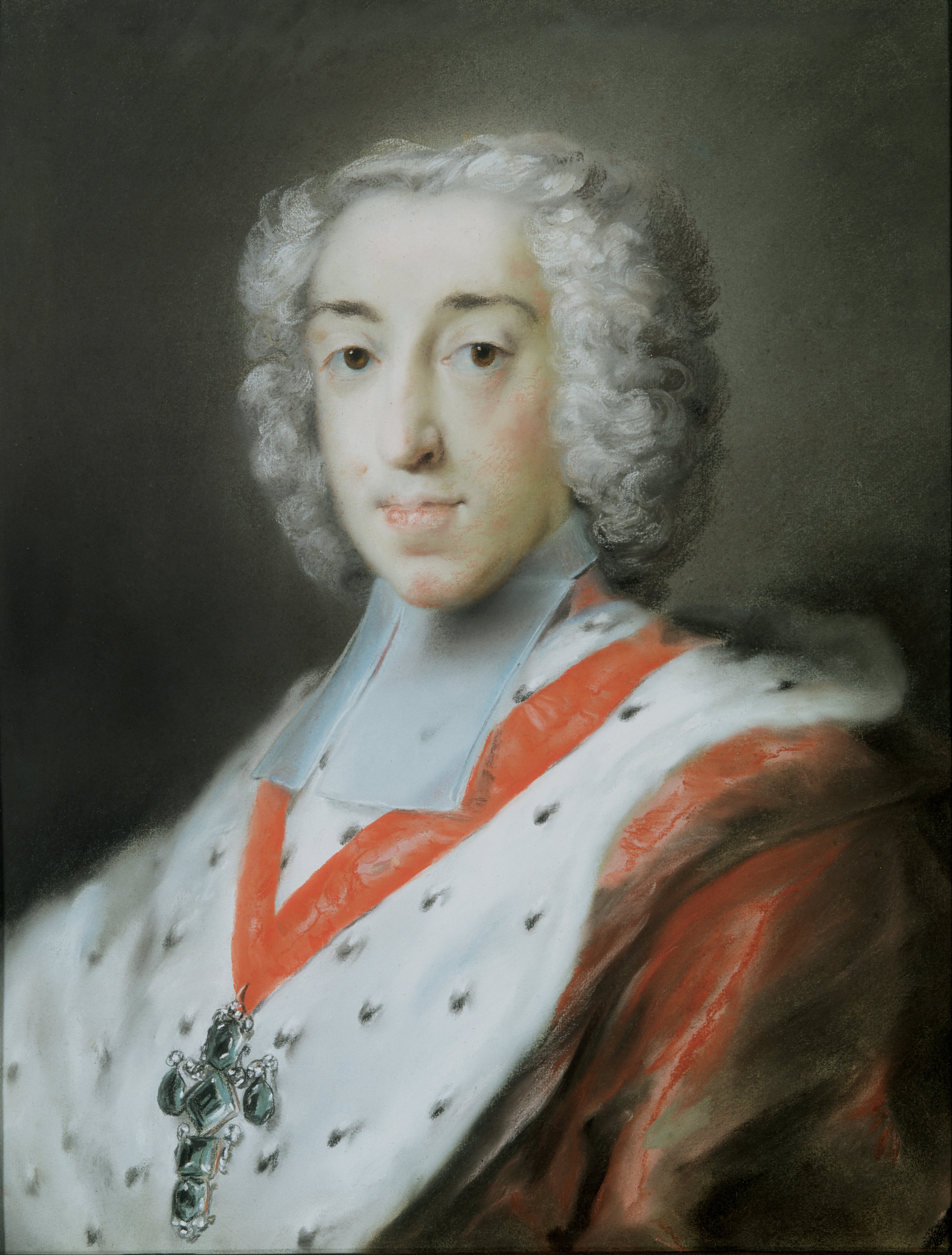
Archbishop-Elector Clemens August of Cologne. Portrait by Rosalba Carriera, 1727. Gemäldegalerie Alte Meister, Dresden.

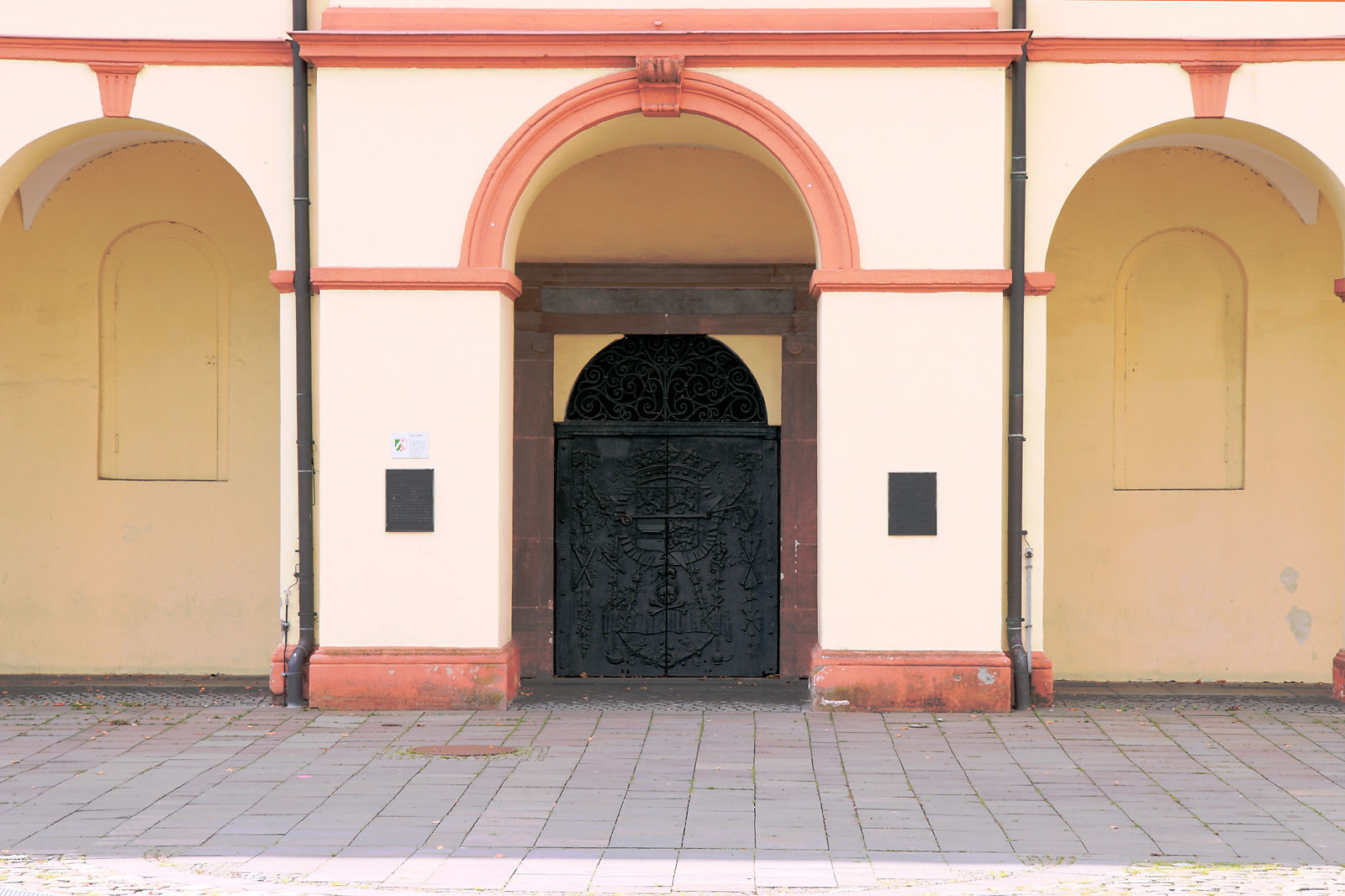
The entrance to the Fürstengruft in Siegen. Photo: Bob Ionescu, 2009.

When, during the renovation of the Fürstengruft in 1951, the marble slabs that had been placed in front of the niches in 1893 had to be reattached, it was possible to take a look inside the graves. It was discovered that many graves had already been opened. Behind the slabs were walls of field-baked bricks, some of which were loose and allowed a view into the interior of the niches. In the light of a strong flashlight one could see that in the niche of Frederick William is a coffin apparently made of mahogany, framed by gilt bands about 4 cm wide.

== Marriage and issue ==
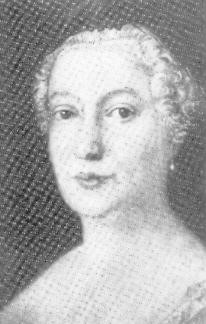
Countess Sophie Polyxena Concordia of Sayn-Wittgenstein-Hohenstein. Detail of a anonymous portrait, 18th century. Siegerlandmuseum, Siegen.

Frederick William married at Ludwigseck Hunting Lodge near Feudingen on 23 September 1728 (Note: "See the registers of the Protestant court parish in Siegen: «1728 den 23 Sept. Nachts zwischen 11 und 12 Uhr sind auf dem Hochgräfl. Wittgensteinischen Jagdhauses Ludwigs-Eck … ehelich zusammen geworden der Durchl. Fürst und Herr Friedrich Wilhelm …». See State Archives Wiesbaden (170^{III}), notification dated 24‑9‑1728, Wittgenstein: «gestern auf meinem Jagdhaus Ludwigseck durch priesterliche Copulation vollzogen worden».") to Countess Sophie Polyxena Concordia of Sayn-Wittgenstein-Hohenstein (Note: Dek (1970), p. 99 mentions only the name Sayn-Wittgenstein.) (Berlin, 28 May 1709 (Note: "See Archives of the princes of Sayn-Wittgenstein-Hohenstein, Wittgenstein Castle, Laasphe, notification dated Berlin 8‑6‑1709: «am 28ten Maii abends um 9 Uhr». The mother died on 4 June and the child was baptised on 11 June «à la maison» (baptismal register of Berlin Cathedral), which proves that the birth took place in Berlin.") – Untere Schloss, Siegen, 15 December 1781 (Note: "See Dek (1970), confirmed by the parish registers, notifications and an article in the Dillenburgische Intelligenz Nachrichten, LI. Stück, Sonnabends, den 22 Decembris 1781: «Den 15ten dieses des Abends». Vorsterman van Oyen (1882) states she died in 1783.")), the second daughter of Count August of Sayn-Wittgenstein-Hohenstein and his first wife Countess Concordia of Sayn-Wittgenstein-Hohenstein.

From the marriage of Frederick William and Sophie Polyxena Concordia the following children were born:

1. Charlotte Sophia Louise (Note: Huberty, et al. (1981), p. 388 names her Charlotte Sophie. The given name Charlotte Sophia Louise in Dek (1970), p. 98 and Vorsterman van Oyen (1882), p. 130.) (Siegen, 6 June 1729 – Burgsteinfurt, 2 April 1759), married in Siegen on 30 September 1748 to Count Charles Peter Ernest of Bentheim-Steinfurt (Burgsteinfurt, 30 August 1729 – Burgsteinfurt, 30 June 1780).
2. Frederica Wilhelmine Polyxena (Nassauischer Hof, Siegen, 3 April 1730 – Wittgenstein Castle, Laasphe, 18 November 1733).
3. Mary Eleonore Concordia (Siegen, 2 March 1731 – Kamen, 20 April 1759). She died of smallpox in the house of the preacher Theodore Diederich Henrich Wever in Kamen.
4. Frederica Augusta Sophia (Nassauischer Hof, Siegen, 1 June 1732 – Nassauischer Hof, Siegen, 23 March 1733).
5. Anne Charlotte Augusta (Note: Given name according to Menk (2004), p. 201 and Huberty, et al. (1981), p. 388. Huberty, et al. (1981), p. 406 mentions that this given name appears in the baptismal certificate. The given name Catharina Anna (Charlotte Augusta) in Dek (1970), p. 98 and Lück & Wunderlich (1956), p. 35. The given name Catharina Anna in Vorsterman van Oyen (1882), p. 130, who mentions in a footnote that she also appears as Anna Charlotte Augusta.) (Nassauischer Hof, Siegen, 19 June 1734 – Untere Schloss, Siegen, 9 June 1759).

== Ancestors ==
Ancestors of Frederick William II, Prince of Nassau-Siegen
Great-great-grandparents	John VII 'the Middle' of Nassau-Siegen (1561–1623) ⚭ 1603; Margaret of Schleswig-Holstein-Sonderburg (1583–1658)	George Ernest of Limburg-Stirum (1593–1661) ⚭ 1603; Magdalene of Bentheim-Tecklenburg (1591–1649)	Louis Henry of Nassau-Dillenburg (1594–1662) ⚭ 1615; Catharine of Sayn-Wittgenstein (1588–1651)	Peter Melander (1589–1648) ⚭ 1638; Agnes von Efferen genannt Hall (?–1656)	George I 'the Pious' of Hesse-Darmstadt (1547–1596) ⚭ 1572; Magdalene of Lippe (1552–1587)	Christopher of Leiningen-Westerburg (1575–1635) ⚭ 1601; Anna Maria Ungnad von Weißenwolff (1573–1606)	William of Courland (1574–1640) ⚭ 1609; Sophie of Prussia (1582–1610)	George William of Brandenburg (1595–1640) ⚭ 1616; Elisabeth Charlotte of the Palatinate (1597–1660)
Great-grandparents	Henry of Nassau-Siegen (1611–1652) ⚭ 1646; Mary Magdalene of Limburg-Stirum (1632–1707)		Adolf of Nassau-Schaumburg (1629–1676) ⚭ 1653; Elisabeth Charlotte Melander (1640–1707)		Frederick I 'the Elder' of Hesse-Homburg (1585–1638) ⚭ 1622; Margaret Elisabeth of Leiningen-Westerburg (1604–1667)		Jacob of Courland (1610–1682) ⚭ 1645; Louise Charlotte of Brandenburg (1617–1676)	
Grandparents	William Maurice of Nassau-Siegen (1649–1691) ⚭ 1678; Ernestine Charlotte of Nassau-Schaumburg (1662–1732)				Frederick II of Hesse-Homburg (1633–1708) ⚭ 1670; Louise Elisabeth of Courland (1646–1690)			
Parents	Frederick William Adolf of Nassau-Siegen (1680–1722) ⚭ 1702; Elisabeth Juliana Francisca of Hesse-Homburg (1681–1707)							

== Sources ==
- Aßmann, Helmut & Menk, Friedhelm (1996). Auf den Spuren von Nassau und Oranien in Siegen (in German). Siegen: Gesellschaft für Stadtmarketing Siegen e.V.
- Behr, Kamill (1854). Genealogie der in Europa regierenden Fürstenhäuser (in German). Leipzig: Verlag von Bernhard Tauchnitz.
- Dek, A.W.E. (1962). Graf Johann der Mittlere von Nassau-Siegen und seine 25 Kinder (in German). Rijswijk: Krips Repro.
- Dek, A.W.E. (1968). "De afstammelingen van Juliana van Stolberg tot aan het jaar van de Vrede van Münster". Spiegel der Historie. Maandblad voor de geschiedenis der Nederlanden (in Dutch). 1968 (7/8): 228–303.
- Dek, A.W.E. (1970). Genealogie van het Vorstenhuis Nassau (in Dutch). Zaltbommel: Europese Bibliotheek.
- von Ehrenkrook, Hans Friedrich; Förster, Karl & Marchtaler, Kurt Erhard (1928). Ahnenreihen aus allen deutschen Gauen. Beilage zum Archiv für Sippenforschung und allen verwandten Gebieten (in German). Görlitz: Verlag für Sippenforschung und Wappenkunde C.A. Starke.
- Huberty, Michel; Giraud, Alain & Magdelaine, F. & B. (1976). l'Allemagne Dynastique (in French). Vol. Tome I: Hesse-Reuss-Saxe. Le Perreux: Alain Giraud.
- Huberty, Michel; Giraud, Alain & Magdelaine, F. & B. (1981). l'Allemagne Dynastique (in French). Vol. Tome III: Brunswick-Nassau-Schwarzbourg. Le Perreux: Alain Giraud.
- Knetsch, Carl (1931). Das Haus Brabant. Genealogie der Herzoge von Brabant und der Landgrafen von Hessen (in German). Vol. II. Teil: Die Nachkommen Philipps des Grossmütigen. Darmstadt: Historischer Verein für das Großherzogtum Hessen.
- Lück, Alfred (1981) [1967]. Siegerland und Nederland (in German) (2nd ed.). Siegen: Siegerländer Heimatverein e.V.
- Lück, Alfred & Wunderlich, Hermann (1956) [1952]. Die Fürstengruft zu Siegen (in German). Siegen: Verkehrsverein Siegen e.V.
- Menk, Friedhelm (1971). Quellen zur Geschichte des Siegerlandes im niederländischen königlichen Hausarchiv (in German). Siegen: Stadt Siegen/Forschungsstelle Siegerland.
- Menk, Friedhelm (2004). "Die Fürstengruft zu Siegen und die darin von 1669 bis 1781 erfolgten Beisetzungen". In Burwitz, Ludwig; Menk, Friedhelm; Opfermann, Ulrich Friedrich; Pfau, Dieter & Plaum, Bernd D. (eds.). Siegener Beiträge. Jahrbuch für regionale Geschichte (in German). Vol. 9. Siegen: Geschichtswerkstatt Siegen – Arbeitskreis für Regionalgeschichte e.V. pp. 183–202. ISSN 1431-6684.
- Textor von Haiger, Johann (1617). Nassauische Chronik (in German). Herborn: Christoph Raab.
- Vorsterman van Oyen, A.A. (1882). Het vorstenhuis Oranje-Nassau. Van de vroegste tijden tot heden (in Dutch). Leiden/Utrecht: A.W. Sijthoff/J.L. Beijers.

Frederick William II of Nassau-Siegen House of Nassau-Siegen (Protestant branch) Born: 11 November 1706 Died: 2 March 1734
Regnal titles
Preceded by Frederick William Adolf	Fürst of Nassau-Siegen; 13 February 1722 – 2 March 1734	Succeeded by Christian of Nassau-Dillenburg; William Charles Henry Friso of Nassau-Diez
Preceded by Frederick William Adolf	Count of Bronkhorst, Lord of Wisch, Borculo, Lichtenvoorde and Wildenborch, Hereditary Knight Banneret of the Duchy of Guelders and the County of Zutphen; 13 February 1722 – 2 March 1734	Succeeded by ?
