= Alexander Hermann, Count of Wartensleben =

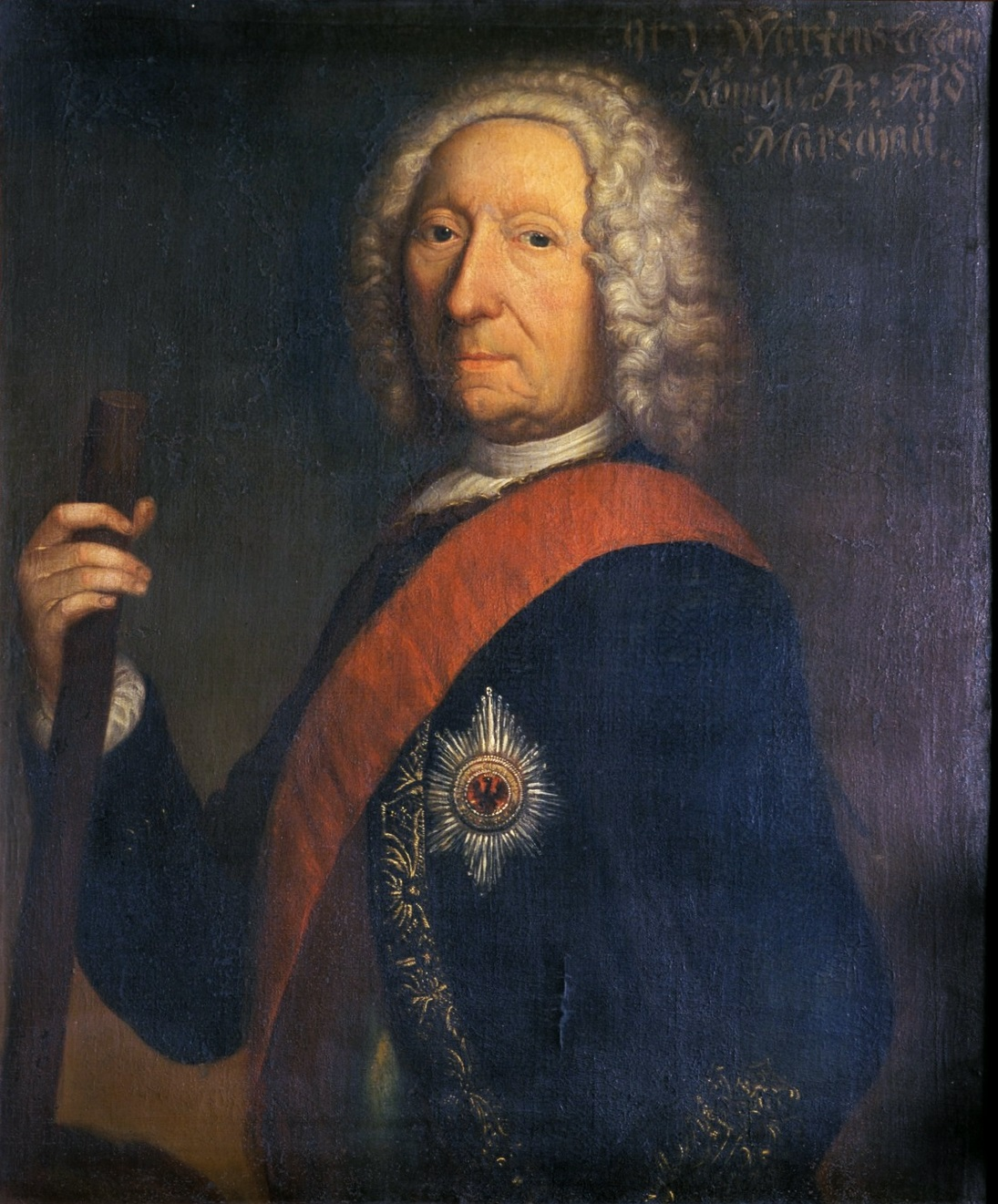
- Born: 16 December 1650; Bad Lippspringe
- Died: 26 January 1734 (aged 83); Berlin
- Occupation: Military officer

Alexander Hermann Graf von Wartensleben (16 December 1650 in Bad Lippspringe – 26 January 1734 in Berlin) was an officer in the armies of various German states, a Prussian Generalfeldmarschall and a member of the Cabinet of Three Counts with August David zu Sayn-Wittgenstein-Hohenstein and Johann Kasimir Kolbe von Wartenberg - due to their heavy taxation, this was also known as the "three great W(oes)" of Prussia (Wartenberg, Wartensleben, Wittgenstein).

Between 1702 and 1723 he held the position of regimental chef of the 1st Prussian Infantry Regiment.

== Life ==
He was the eldest son of Hermann Hans von Wartensleben and his wife Elisabeth von Haxthausen. His father was lord of Güter Exten, as well as of Rinteln, Nordhold and Ottleben. He led the Wartensleben Infantry Regiment at the Battle of Blenheim.

1709 he became lord of the manor in Lichte (Wallendorf), Thuringian Highlands.
