= Frederick William Adolf, Prince of Nassau-Siegen =

German reigning prince (1680–1722)

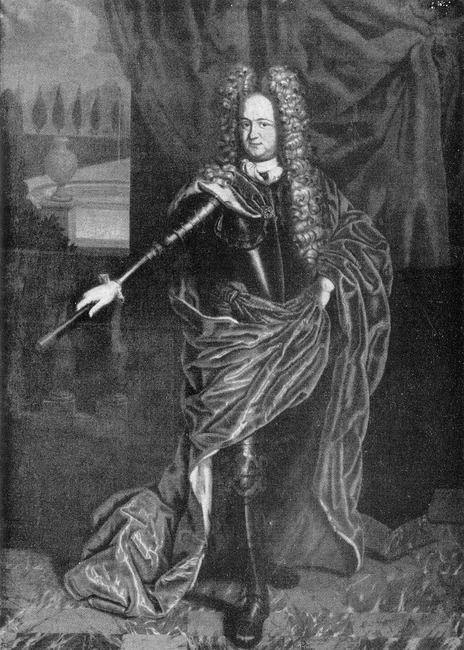
- Fürst Frederick William Adolf of Nassau-Siegen. Anonymous portrait, first quarter 18th century. Siegerlandmuseum, Siegen.

Fürst of Nassau-Siegen
- Coat of arms
- Reign: 1691–1722
- Predecessor: William Maurice
- Successor: Frederick William II
- Full name: Frederick William Adolf Prince of Nassau-Siegen
- Native name: Friedrich Wilhelm Adolf Fürst von Nassau-Siegen
- Born: Friedrich Wilhelm Adolf Prinz von Nassau, Graf zu Katzenelnbogen, Vianden, Diez, Limburg und Bronkhorst, Herr zu Beilstein, Stirum, Wisch, Borculo, Lichtenvoorde und Wildenborch, Erbbannerherr des Herzogtums Geldern und der Grafschaft Zutphen; 20 February 1680; Nassauischer Hof, Siegen
- Died: 13 February 1722 (aged 41); Nassauischer Hof, Siegen
- Buried: 10 April 1722; Fürstengruft, Siegen
- Noble family: House of Nassau-Siegen
- Spouses: Elisabeth Juliana Francisca of Hesse-Homburg; Amalie Louise of Courland
- Issue Detail: Frederick William II
- Father: William Maurice of Nassau-Siegen
- Mother: Ernestine Charlotte of Nassau-Schaumburg
- Occupation: Captain of a company in the Dutch States Army 1684

Prince Frederick William Adolf (Note: "In almost all official documents he is mentioned with these three given names, but sometimes only Frederick William (see for instance Menk (1971), p. 89). Dek (1970) names him Frederik Willem I Adolf; Europäische Stammtafeln on the other hand, mentions him as Adolf in its table Nassau-Siegen (band I, 117), while in other places he mentions him under the double given name Friedrich Wilhelm, which causes some confusion among readers.") of Nassau-Siegen (20 February 1680 – 13 February 1722), German: Friedrich Wilhelm Adolf Fürst von Nassau-Siegen, official titles: Fürst zu Nassau, Graf zu Katzenelnbogen, Vianden, Diez, Limburg und Bronkhorst, Herr zu Beilstein, Stirum, Wisch, Borculo, Lichtenvoorde und Wildenborch, Erbbannerherr des Herzogtums Geldern und der Grafschaft Zutphen, was since 1691 Fürst of Nassau-Siegen, a part of the County of Nassau. He descended from the House of Nassau-Siegen, a cadet branch of the Ottonian Line of the House of Nassau.

Not much is known about his life, but a short biography written by his councillor Miltenberger is kept in the Royal House Archive of the Netherlands in The Hague.

== Biography ==
Frederick William Adolf was born in the Nassauischer Hof in Siegen on 20 February 1680 as the eldest son of Fürst William Maurice of Nassau-Siegen and Princess Ernestine Charlotte of Nassau-Schaumburg. He was baptised in Siegen on 3 March. Among his godfathers were two later kings, namely Elector Frederick III of Brandenburg (later King Frederick I of Prussia) and Prince William III of Orange (later King William III of England). Already on 6 September 1684 Frederick William Adolf became a captain of a company in the Dutch States Army to the repartition (Note: Through the system of repartition, the provinces of the Dutch Republic paid for the troops assigned to them.) of Friesland.

=== Fürst of Nassau-Siegen ===
On the death of his father in 1691, Frederick William Adolf succeeded his father as the territorial lord of the Protestant part of the principality of Nassau-Siegen and co-ruler of the city of Siegen. He possessed the district of Siegen (with the exception of seven villages) and the districts of Hilchenbach and Freudenberg. He shared the city of Siegen with his second cousins, John Francis Desideratus (until 1699) and William Hyacinth (since 1699), the Catholic Fürsten of Nassau-Siegen. Frederick William Adolf also succeeded his father as count of Bronkhorst, lord of Wisch, Borculo, Lichtenvoorde and Wildenborch, and hereditary knight banneret of the Duchy of Guelders and the County of Zutphen. Because he was still a minor, he was under the custody and regency of his mother until 1701. The young prince made several trips to the royal courts of England and France, from where he returned to Siegen as late as 1701.

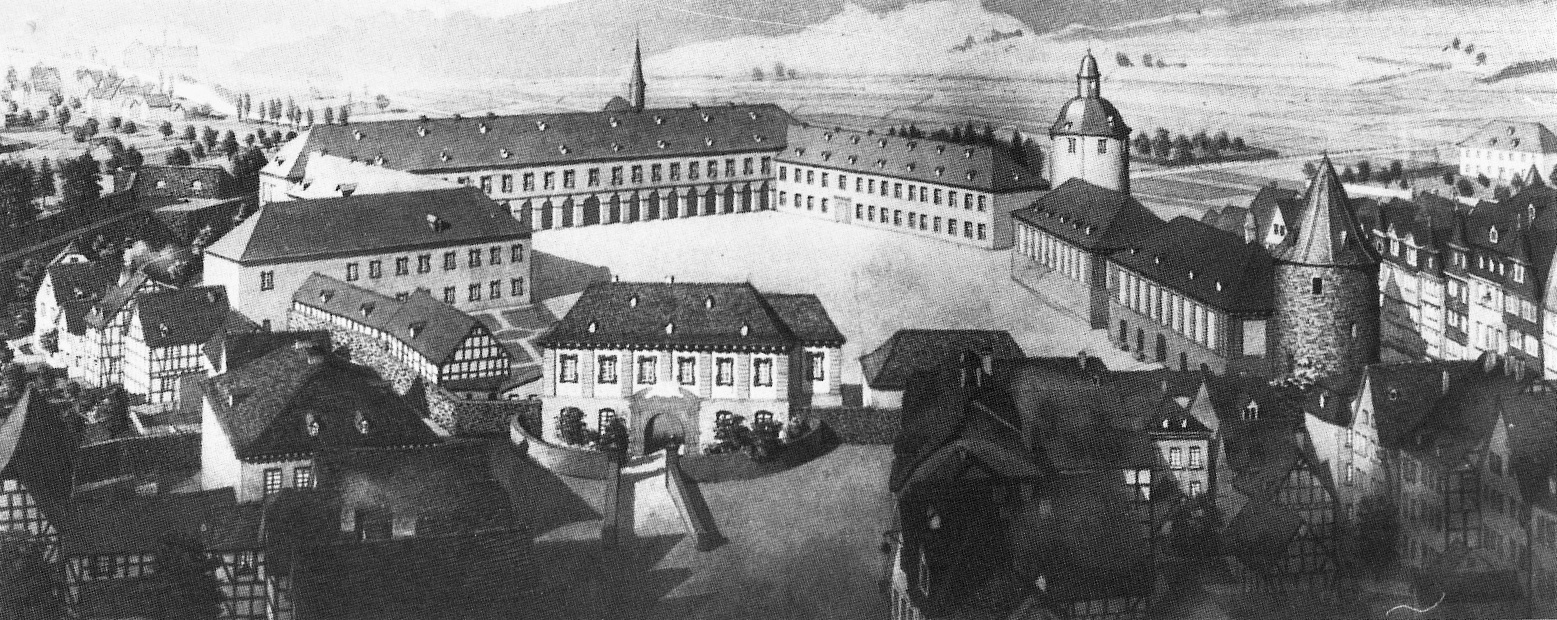
The new Nassauischer Hof, later called Untere Schloss, seen from the west, ca. 1720. Attempt at reconstruction, ink drawing, Wilhelm Scheiner, 1922.

In 1695, a major city fire destroyed a large part of Siegen, including the Nassauischer Hof, the princely Residenz, and the nearby church. Both buildings were built in 1488 by Count John V of Nassau-Siegen as a Franciscan monastery. The Nassauischer Hof housed, among others, the collection of paintings of the Fürsten of Nassau-Siegen. Numerous valuable paintings by famous artists, including Rembrandt, Peter Paul Rubens and Anthony van Dyck, fell victim to the flames. The nearby Fürstengruft was spared in the fire. The burnt down residence building was not rebuilt. Under the old name, a new three-winged palace was built on the site, and the Fürstengruft was completely incorporated into the corps de logis. The construction of the new palace, which has been called Untere Schloss since the middle of the 18th century, took place between 1695 and 1720. Frederick William Adolf devoted all his energy to governmental affairs and the reconstruction of the city of Siegen and the new palace (for which the plans were still the work of Fürst John Maurice and his Dutch architects Pieter and Maurits Post).

The hospitality of the magistrate of Siegen was always guided by the utmost frugality. When Frederick William Adolf's father-in-law, Landgrave Frederick II of Hesse-Homburg (who later became known in literature as Prinz Friedrich von Homburg through Heinrich von Kleist) visited the Nassauischer Hof in 1702, he was given the obligatory gift of wine by the city. At an evening reception in the town hall, however, the landgrave had to settle for beer, because – according to the town's accounts – "er seinen Wein bereits erhalten habe" ("he already had received his wine"). As a special honour, however, the magistrate had engaged the city pipers from Cologne for the festive reception, who certainly played at the dinner and the ball.

=== Difficulties with the Catholic Fürst William Hyacinth ===
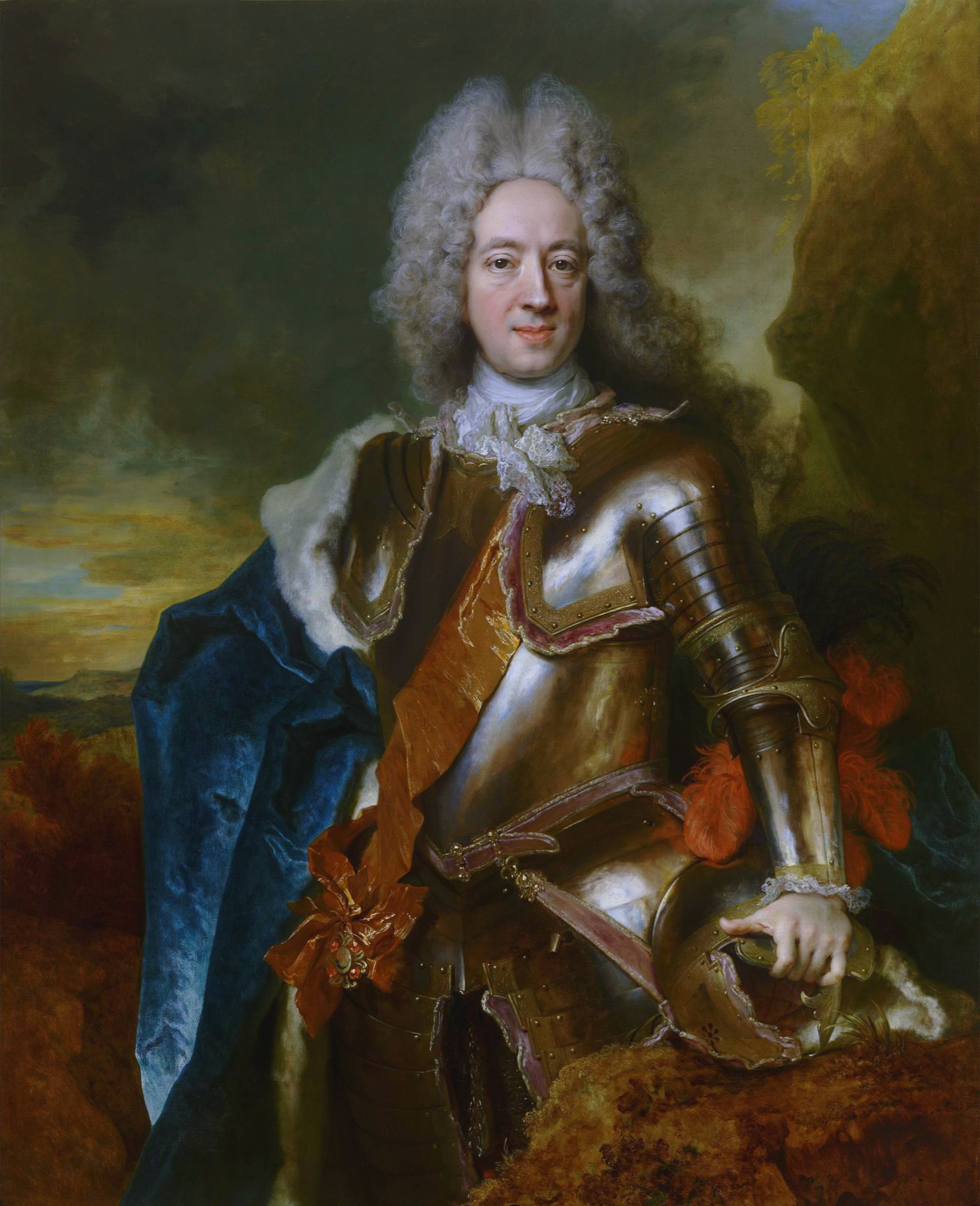
William Hyacinth, the Catholic Fürst of Nassau-Siegen. Portrait by Nicolas de Largillière, 18th century. Mauritshuis, The Hague.

In 1703, the Catholic Fürst William Hyacinth had his part of the city separated from the Reformed part, although the city was actually jointly owned, and at the lower end of Burgstraße he had a wall and a gate constructed, which was always guarded by two picket guards. At the same time, he had a tower built next to the wall enclosing the Hasengarten, which was flattened at the top and on which stood a statue of the Virgin Mary and was therefore popularly known as die platte Merge (the flat virgin). The tower was equipped with two cannons aimed at the Residenz of the Reformed princely family in the Nassauischer Hof. Frederick William Adolf repeatedly tried – through the mediation his relatives Fürst William II of Nassau-Dillenburg and Fürst Francis Alexander of Nassau-Hadamar – to reach an amicable settlement with William Hyacinth, but the latter remained unapproachable. His servants dared to assault citizens of Siegen in the streets and in some cases to inflict life-threatening injuries. Therefore, Frederick William Adolf finally requested the intervention of King Frederick I of Prussia in his capacity as member of the Westphalian Circle. Prussian troops then entered Siegen and temporarily (18 January – 24 February 1705) secured the rights of the population. During this period, the citizens destroyed die platte Merge.

William Hyacinth, who stayed with the Emperor in Vienna at the beginning of 1705 and hoped in vain to win him over, experienced many changes on his return. Suddenly he intensified the pressure in the religious domain. Complaints about this and about the unbearable burden of the tax rate, as well as about completely nonsensical regulations which paralysed economic life in Siegerland, finally led the Aulic Council to order the Electoral Palatinate to investigate the conditions in Nassau-Siegen. On 15 July 1706, dragoons from Palatinate-Neuburg suddenly entered Siegen, together with a detachment of Prussian troops and 500 men of the Ausschuß of the Duchy of Berg. They did not leave the city until 24 July, after various military measures to end harrowing injustices.

When on 29 March 1707 William Hyacinth had the innocent citizen Friedrich Flender beheaded without trial or conviction, the complaints of the Catholic population to the Aulic Council became so urgent that the latter ordered the cathedral chapter in Cologne to investigate the abuses in the Catholic part of Nassau-Siegen (because the Archbishop of Cologne was in imperial ban at the time, the cathedral chapter governed the Archdiocese of Cologne). The subjects of William Hyacinth were particularly annoyed by an edict proclaimed on 8 November 1706, according to which anyone who had a fortune and could pay the taxes but did not, had to have their heads cut off. The Friedrich Flender case had shown that William Hyacinth was indeed serious about carrying out such threats.

On 20 April 1707 representatives of the cathedral chapter in Cologne appeared in Siegen with an armed contingent and occupied Siegen Castle. William Hyacinth fled headlong, first to Burbach, then via Hadamar to Limburg an der Lahn. There he invited William II of Nassau-Dillenburg and Francis Alexander of Nassau-Hadamar and pointed out to them what it could mean if a Nassau area were to fall permanently under the administration of the Archdiocese of Cologne. The cohesion within the House of Nassau was so great that the relatives even promised their support to such an incompetent man as William Hyacinth in order to regain governmental power.

The next year and a half, William Hyacinth stayed in Regensburg. His attempts at the Imperial Diet achieved nothing. Furthermore, at that time he also tried to sell the Catholic principality of Nassau-Siegen. He offered it to Frederick I of Prussia, but the latter did not even consider it because he knew that such a sale would be against the Nassau house laws. Willem Hyacinth also offered it to his Protestant second cousin Frederick William Adolf. The latter did not accept the offer because everyone could foresee that the Catholic line of Nassau-Siegen sooner or later would become extinct without male heirs and that the part of the land would fall to the Protestant relatives anyway. But actually the Protestant line already became extinct in the male line in 1734, while the Catholic line became extinct in the male line in 1743.

In October 1712 Frederick William Adolf and William Hyacinth reached an agreement about their share in the city of Siegen. William Hyacinth ceded the Catholic land to Frederick William Adolf in exchange for an annual pension of 12,000 Reichsthalers. There was even an intention to marry off Maria Anna Josepha, William Hyacinth's underage daughter, to the even younger reformed Hereditary Prince Frederick William. All this was done not in the least to get rid of the troublesome foreign administration.

=== Partial inheritance of Nassau-Hadamar ===
On the death of Fürst Francis Alexander of Nassau-Hadamar in 1711, when the House of Nassau-Hadamar became extinct in the male line, Frederick William Adolf inherited the Principality of Nassau-Hadamar together with the Fürsten William Hyacinth of Nassau-Siegen, William II of Nassau-Dillenburg and John William Friso of Nassau-Diez. (Note: "See Spielmann (1909) and De Clercq (1962), p. 146. When the cadet branch Nassau-Hadamar became extinct in 1711, the principality of Nassau-Hadamar was jointly governed by the cadet branches Nassau-Diez, Nassau-Siegen and Nassau-Dillenburg until 1717.") When the principality of Nassau-Hadamar was divided in 1717, Frederick William Adolf and William Hyacinth of Nassau-Siegen acquired the city of Hadamar, Dehrn and Niederzeuzheim. These territories represented one third of the inheritance. As they belonged to both William Hyacinth and Frederick William Adolf, Frederick William Adolf therefore owned only one-sixth of Nassau-Hadamar.

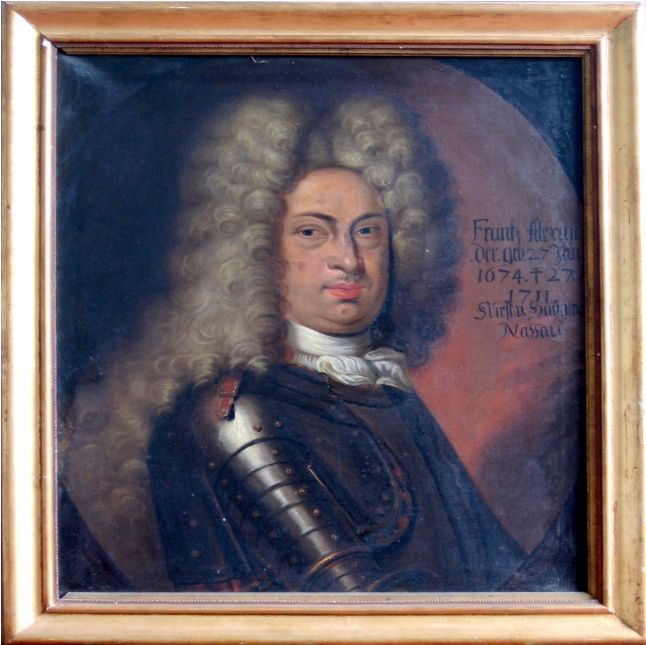
Fürst Francis Alexander of Nassau-Hadamar. Stadtmuseum Hadamar.

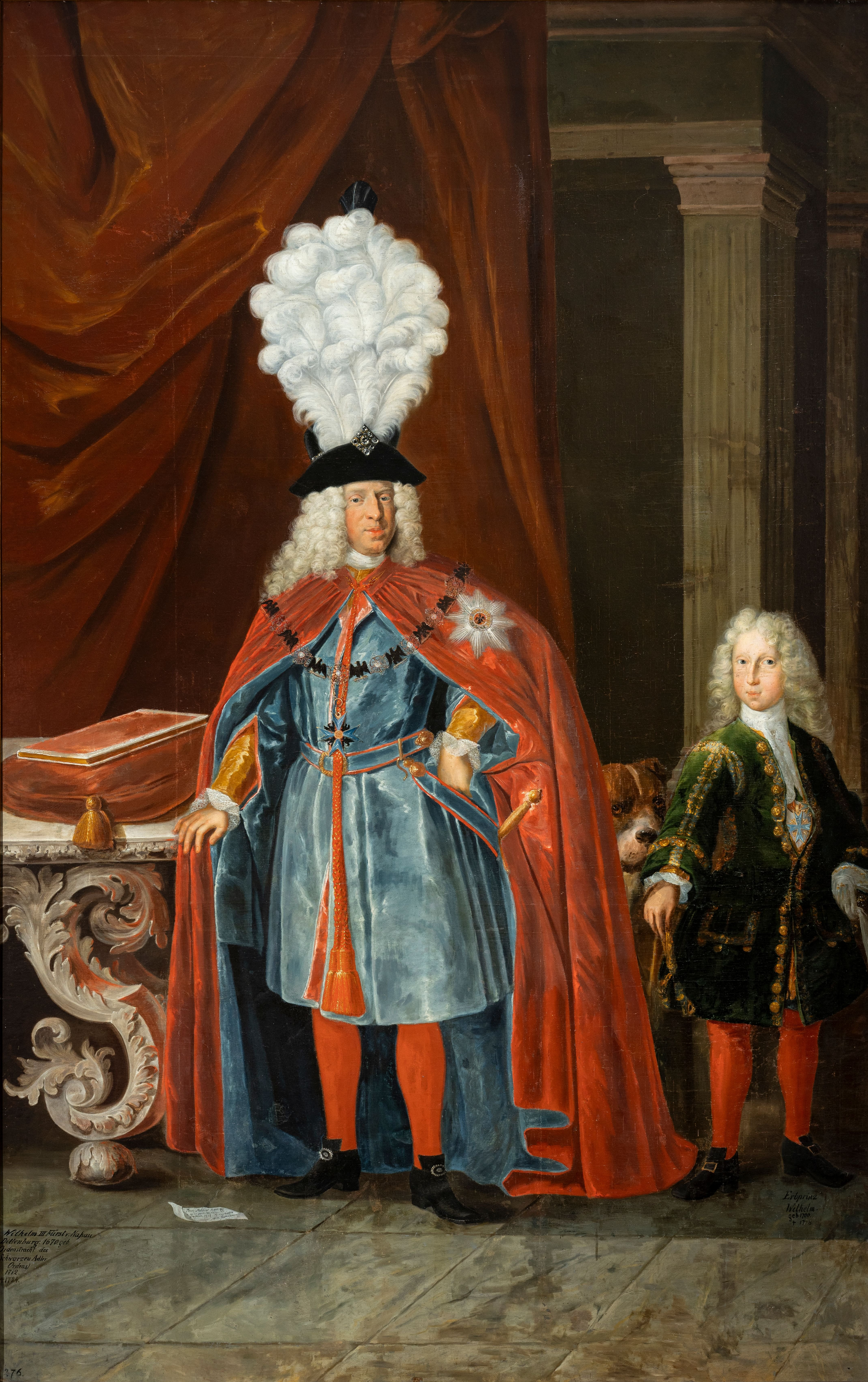
Fürst William II of Nassau-Dillenburg.

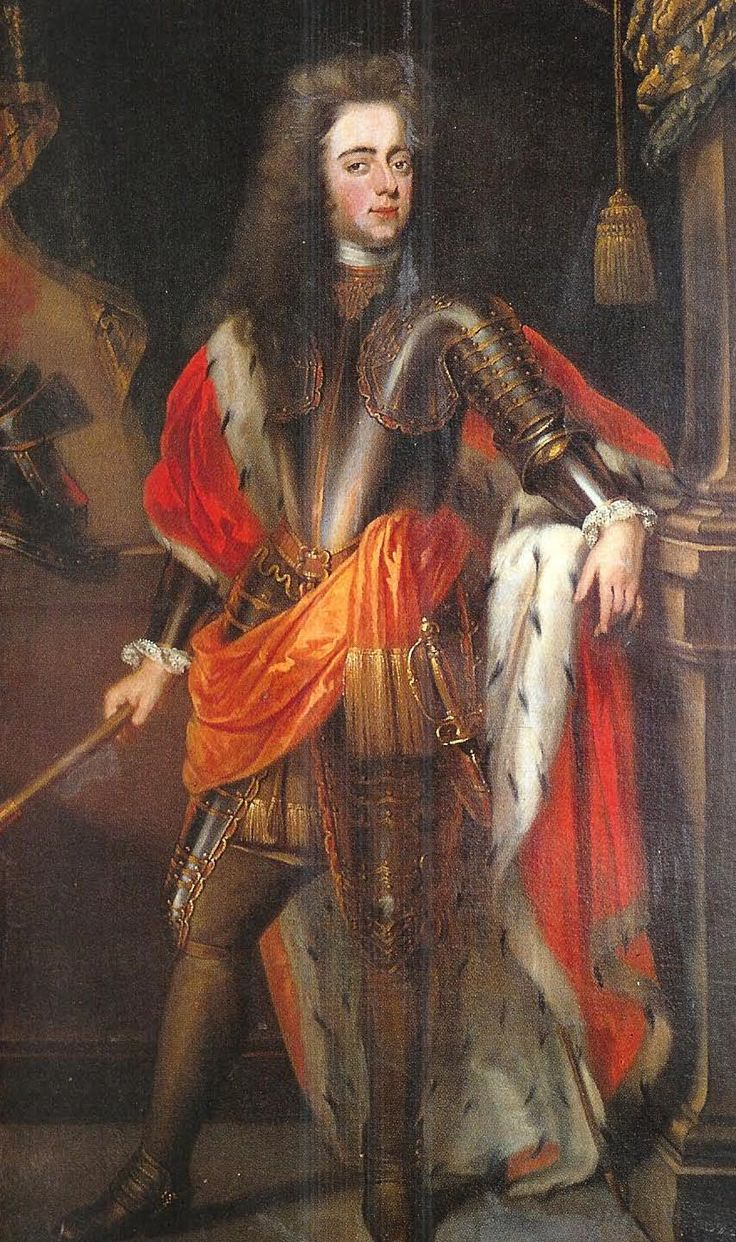
Fürst John William Friso of Nassau-Diez. Portrait by Lancelot Volders, 1710. Stadhouderlijk Hof, Leeuwarden.

=== Death, burial and succession ===
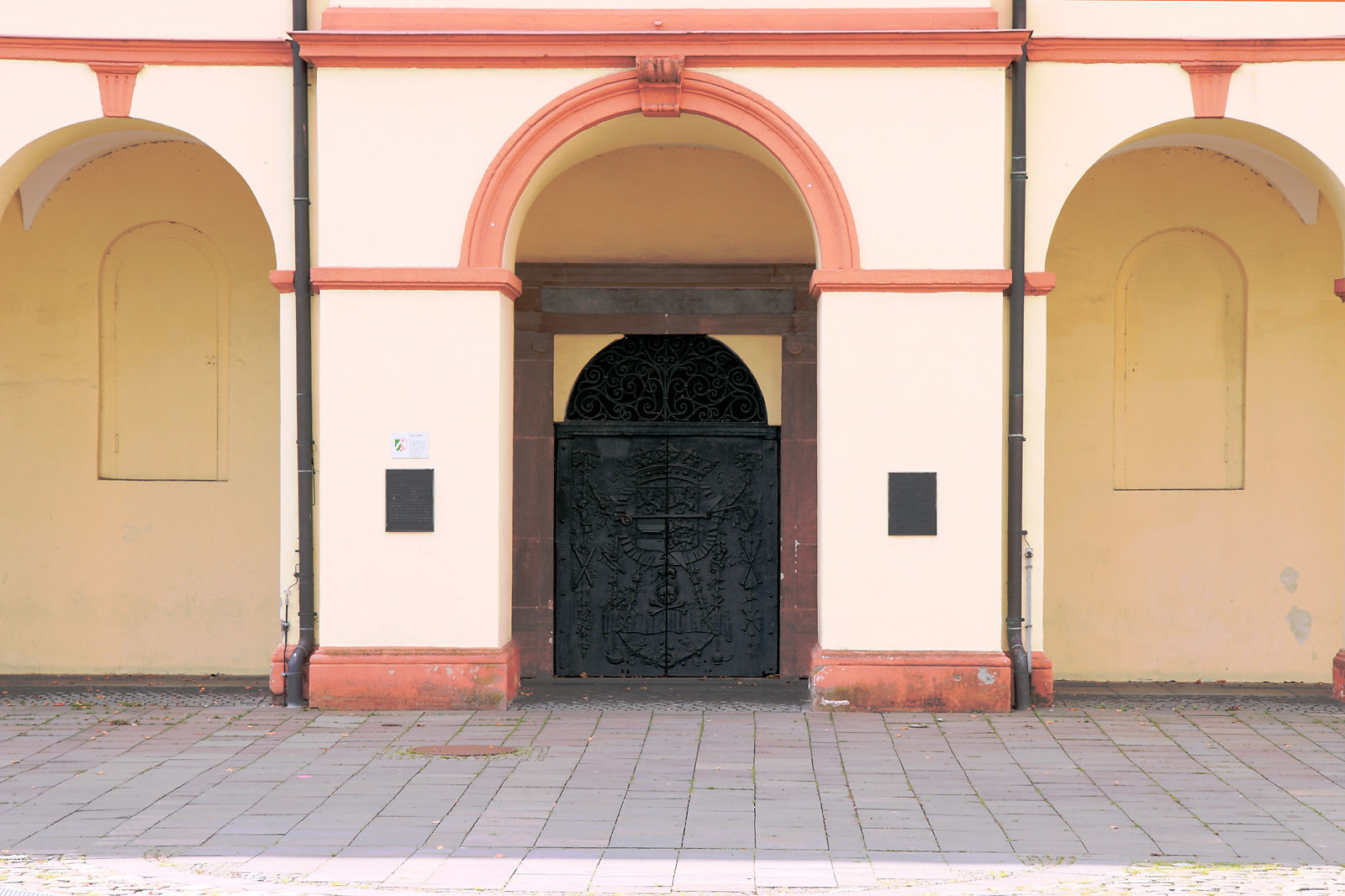
The entrance to the Fürstengruft in Siegen. Photo: Bob Ionescu, 2009.

Frederick William Adolf died of dropsy in the Nassauischer Hof in Siegen on 13 February 1722. He was buried on 10 April in the Fürstengruft there. He was succeeded by his son Frederick William II, who was under the custody and regency of his stepmother until 1727.

When, during the renovation of the Fürstengruft in 1951, the marble slabs that had been placed in front of the niches in 1893 had to be reattached, it was possible to take a look inside the graves. It was discovered that many graves had already been opened. Behind the slabs were walls of field-baked bricks, some of which were loose and allowed a view into the interior of the niches. In the light of a strong flashlight one could see that in the niche of Frederick William Adolf, at the foot of the very well preserved coffin, there is a box of about 60x40x40 cm, made of zinc or lead.

== Marriages and issue ==
=== First marriage ===
Frederick William Adolf married at Homburg Castle on 7 January 1702 (Note: "Although the marriage announcement (State Archives Marburg 4f, Nassau-Siegen, Nr. 241), dated Siegen 12‑1‑1702 says that it was «den 6 hujus mittelst christgewöhnlicher Einsegnung und Beilager vollzogen» (without mentioning the place), we have taken the 7th, just like Knetsch (1931), according to the register of the reformed parish of Homburg: «Ao 1702 den 7 Januarii ist der Durchlachtigste Fürst Friedrich Wilhelm Adolph zu Nassau-Siegen mit der Durchl. Princesse Elisabetha Juliana Francisca Landgräfin zu Hessen Homburg alhier zu Homburg auf dem festen Schloss ehelich vermählet worden». Likewise, the personal details in the printed funeral sermon: «und darauff noch den 7 Januarii zu Homburg in der Hochfürstl. Schloss Kirche nach erfolgter Priestlichen Copulation Dero Hochfürstl. … Beylager gehalten» and the personalia preserved in the Royal House Archive of the Netherlands (IV/1561): «den 7 Januar 1702 zu Homburg a.d.H. vermittelst Priestlicher Copulation». We found 6‑1 in Dek (1962), Europäische Stammtafeln I, 117, Vorsterman van Oyen (1882), and 7‑1 in Europäische Stammtafeln I, 106 and Knetsch (1931)." Menk (2004), p. 199 however mentions the date 6 January 1702.) to Landgravine Elisabeth Juliana Francisca of Hesse-Homburg (Homburg Castle, 6 January 1681 (Note: "Europäische Stammtafeln I, 117 states, incorrectly, 6‑2‑1681. The actual date is 6‑1‑1681 (see Europäische Stammtafeln I, 106, Knetsch (1931), Dek (1962), Dek (1970) and zu Stolberg-Stolberg & von Arnswaldt), confirmed by the parish records of Homburg, which state that she was born on 6‑1, between eight and nine o'clock in the evening and was baptised on 13‑1.") – Nassauischer Hof, Siegen, 12 November 1707), the fifth daughter of Landgrave Frederick II of Hesse-Homburg and his second wife Duchess Louise Elisabeth of Courland.

From the marriage of Frederick William Adolf and Elisabeth Juliana Francisca the following children were born:

1. Charlotte Frederica (Siegen, 30 November 1702 (Note: "The registers of the Protestant parish of Siegen state that she was born on Thursday afternoon, 30 November at one o'clock and was baptised at the court the following Sunday. So she was born in Siegen. See also State Archives Darmstadt (Hausarchiv 5/74/4), notification of birth dated Siegen 1‑12‑1702: «gestrigen Nachmittags zw. 1 u. 2 Uhren».") – Stadthagen, 22 July 1785 (Note: "See State Archives Bückeburg, Des. L. 176, Stadthagen (ref.) N. 1, S. 92. However, the document does not explicitly mention the place of death. It is also not mentioned in the records of the Lutheran St. Martin's Church in Stadthagen.")), married:
  1. in Weimar on 27 June 1725 to Fürst Leopold of Anhalt-Köthen (Köthen, 29 November 1694^{Jul.} – Köthen, 19 November 1728).
  2. in Varel on 26 April 1730 (Note: "See House Archives Bückeburg, A XIV 7b. The marriage contract mentions the date of the ceremony. See State Archives Wiesbaden (170^{III}), notification dated Varel 27‑4‑1730: «den 26 diesses Monaths durch würkliches Beylaager in der Gräflich Altenburgischen Residentz zu Varel bereits glücklichst vollzogen». See the registers of the Schlossgemeinde (ref.) in Varel: «den 26 April … copuliert». We will therefore neither use the date of 16‑4 given by Europäische Stammtafeln nor the date of 3‑5 (without location) given by Dek (1970).") to Count Albrecht Wolfgang of Schaumburg-Lippe-Bückeburg (Bückeburg, 27 April 1699 – Bückeburg, 24 September 1748).
2. Sophia Mary (Nassauischer Hof, Siegen, 28 January 1704 (Note: "See Dek (1970), confirmed by State Archives Wiesbaden (170^{III}), draft notification dated Siegen 31‑1‑1704: «vergangenen 28. dieses abends zwischen 7 und 8 Uhren».") – Nassauischer Hof, Siegen, 28 August 1704 (Note: "See a) City Archives Siegen, Fürstl. Kanzlei, d.d. Siegen, 1704 August 28: «Nachdem der Leichnam der heutigen Mittag um 11 Uhr … abgelebten … Prinzessin morgen abend in die Fürstliche Gruft beigesetzt werden soll». b) State Archives Wiesbaden (130^{II} 2380^{III} e), notification dated Siegen 29‑8‑1704: «gestrigen Vormittag umb 11 Uhr». The death in Siegen is therefore beyond doubt.")).
3. Sibylle Henriette Eleonore (Note: Huberty, et al. (1981), p. 354 names her Sibylle Henriëtte. The given name Sibylla Henrietta Eleonora in Menk (2004), p. 198; Sibylle Henriëtte Eleonora in Dek (1970), p. 97; Sibylle Henriette Eleonore in Lück & Wunderlich (1956), p. 35 and Sibilla Henrietta Eleonora in Vorsterman van Oyen (1882), p. 128.) (Nassauischer Hof, Siegen, 21 September 1705 (Note: "See Dek (1970), confirmed by State Archives Wiesbaden (170^{III}), draft notification dated Siegen 21‑9‑1705: «heute nachts zwischen 1 u. 2 Uhr». The document contains a note from the chancellery: «Die Hochfürstl. Prinzessin Sibylla Henrietta Eleonora seindt zur Weldt gebohren Montags den 21 7bris 1705 morgens zwischen 1 u. 2 Uhren und darauf dienstags den 29 dito allhier in der Hochfürstl. Residentz vermittelst der Heyl. Taufe».") – Nassauischer Hof, Siegen, 5 September 1712 (Note: "See State Archives Wiesbaden (170^{III}), notification dated Siegen 5‑9‑1712: «heute nachtmittags gegen 4 Uhr». The death therefore occurred in Siegen.")).
4. Fürst Frederick William II (Nassauischer Hof, Siegen, 11 November 1706 (Note: "See Dek (1970), confirmed by State Archives Marburg (4f, Nassau-Siegen, Nr. 241 (2)), notification dated Siegen 11‑11‑1706: «heute früh gleich nach 9 Uhr».") – Nassauischer Hof, Siegen, 2 March 1734 (Note: "Europäische Stammtafeln incorrectly states that he died on 3‑3‑1734. Dek (1970) gives the same date and gives Siegen as place of death. In fact the prince died on 2‑3. See a) parish registers Siegen, b) State Archives Wiesbaden (130^{II} 2209), notification dated Siegen 3‑3‑1734: «gestern nachtmittags zwischen 1 u. 2 Uhr».")), succeeded his father in 1722. Married at Ludwigseck Hunting Lodge near Feudingen on 23 September 1728 (Note: "See the registers of the Protestant court parish in Siegen: «1728 den 23 Sept. Nachts zwischen 11 und 12 Uhr sind auf dem Hochgräfl. Wittgensteinischen Jagdhauses Ludwigs-Eck … ehelich zusammen geworden der Durchl. Fürst und Herr Friedrich Wilhelm …». See State Archives Wiesbaden (170^{III}), notification dated 24‑9‑1728, Wittgenstein: «gestern auf meinem Jagdhaus Ludwigseck durch priesterliche Copulation vollzogen worden».") to Countess Sophie Polyxena Concordia of Sayn-Wittgenstein-Hohenstein (Berlin, 28 May 1709 (Note: "See Archives of the princes of Sayn-Wittgenstein-Hohenstein, Wittgenstein Castle, Laasphe, notification dated Berlin 8‑6‑1709: «am 28ten Maii abends um 9 Uhr». The mother died on 4 June and the child was baptised on 11 June «à la maison» (baptismal register of Berlin Cathedral), which proves that the birth took place in Berlin.") – Untere Schloss, Siegen, 15 December 1781 (Note: "See Dek (1970), confirmed by the parish registers, notifications and an article in the Dillenburgische Intelligenz Nachrichten, LI. Stück, Sonnabends, den 22 Decembris 1781: «Den 15ten dieses des Abends». Vorsterman van Oyen (1882) states she died in 1783.")).
5. Sophia Elizabeth (Nassauischer Hof, Siegen, 7 November 1707 (Note: "It was in Siegen that her mother died a few days after her birth. See Menk (1966). According to the parish registers of Siegen (both for her birth as well as in the death certificate of her mother) the birth is situated on Sunday 6 November at midnight. But we have not chosen this date because of the following two documents: a) Personalia of the mother (printed funeral sermon): «den kurzverwichenen 7 Novemb. eingetretten / Morgends zwischen 1 und 2 Uhr». b) Notification dated Siegen 12‑11‑1707: «am 7. dieses jetzlaufenden Monats morgens zwischen 1 und 2 Uhr».") – Nassauischer Hof, Siegen, 5 October 1708).
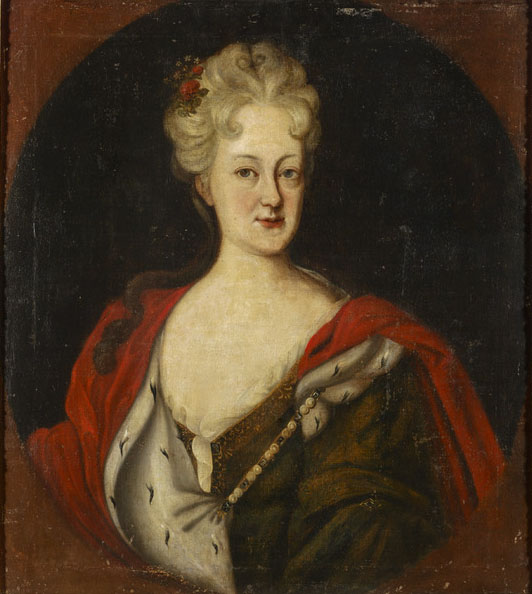
Landgravine Elisabeth Juliana Francisca of Hesse-Homburg (1681–1707). Anonymous portrait, late 17th century or early 18th century. Middachten Castle, De Steeg.

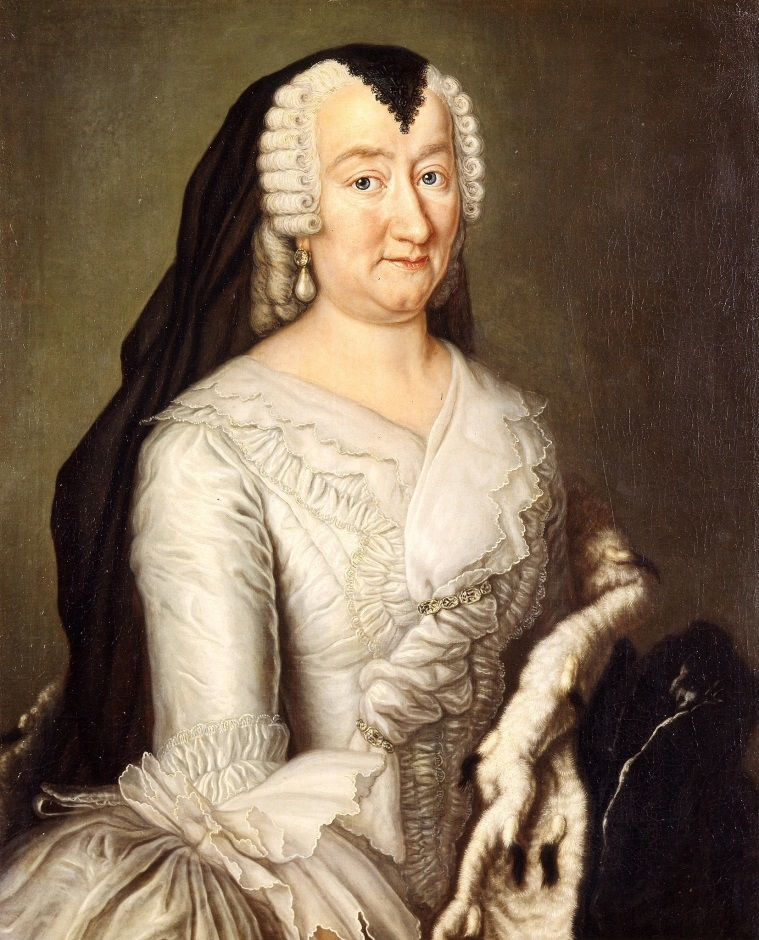
Princess Charlotte Frederica of Nassau-Siegen (1702–1785). Portrait by Christoph Gottfried Ringe, 1751. Foundation Historical Collections of the House of Orange-Nassau, The Hague.

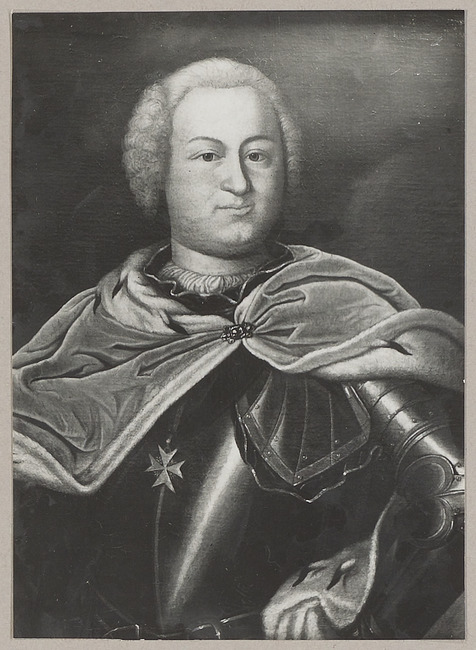
Fürst Frederick William II of Nassau-Siegen. Portrait by Franz Lippold, 1733. Siegerlandmuseum, Siegen.

=== Second marriage ===
Frederick William Adolf remarried at the Old Castle in Bayreuth on 13 April 1708 (Note: "Although Dek (1962) and Dek (1970) place the marriage in Bayreuth on 20‑4‑1708 (date confirmed by Europäische Stammtafeln I, 117, Europäische Stammtafeln II, 88 and Knetsch (1931)), we find in the marriage contract that was signed in Siegen on 6‑8‑1708: «solches durch das Fürstliche Beylager mit öffentlichen und gewöhnlichen Christfürstlichen Ceremonien den 13. April des noch laufenden 1708 Jahres in der Fürstlichen Residenz zu Bayreuth vollzogen». The date 13 April is confirmed by the notification of the marriage (see State Archives Marburg 4f, Nassau-Siegen N. 241), dated Bayreuth 18‑4‑1708: «den 13. Aprilis allhier zu Bayreuth … durch würklich gehaltenes Beylager». See also in the Royal House Archive of the Netherlands (IV/1561), personalia: «den 13. April 1708 dero christfürstl. Beylager in Bayreuth». The registers of the Hofkirche in Bayreuth have disappeared.") to his first cousin Duchess Amalie Louise of Courland (Mitau, 23 July 1687 (Note: "Although Dek (1970) and Europäische Stammtafeln I, 117 and II, 88 say that she was born on 27‑7‑1687, we could establish that the birth took place in Mitau on the 23rd. Indeed, the notification that the Duke of Courland sent from Mitau on 24‑7‑1687 announces the birth of a daughter «gestern morgens» (see State Archives Wiesbaden 170^{III}).") – Unteres Schloss, Siegen, 18 January 1750), the third daughter of Duke Frederick Casimir of Courland and his first wife Princess Sophie Amalie of Nassau-Siegen.

From the marriage of Frederick William Adolf and Amalie Louise the following children were born:

1. Sophia Wilhelmine Adolphina (Nassauischer Hof, Siegen, 28 February 1709 (Note: "According to the parish registers of Siegen, she was born on 1‑3, but the draft notification (State Archives Wiesbaden 170^{III}) shows that she was born on 28‑2: «gestrigen Donnerstag Nachts zwischen eilff und 12 Uhren».") – Nassauischer Hof, Siegen, 16 December 1710 (Note: "The death occurred on 17‑12‑1710 in Europäische Stammtafeln and on 16‑(burial on 17)12‑1710 in Dek (1970). The parish registers of Siegen give 16th as the date of death. See also Royal House Archive of the Netherlands (IV/1561 I‑II), two letters of condolence from which it can be deduced that the death took place in Siegen and in which the date of the 16th is confirmed: a) letter of condolence in response to a notification from Siegen dated 17‑12‑1710, b) letter of condolence in response to a notification in which the death was announced «am 16ten letztverwichenen Monaths Morgendts ein Viertel nach acht Uhren».")).
2. Charles Frederick (Nassauischer Hof, Siegen, 4 March 1710 (Note: "Europäische Stammtafeln wrongly states that he was born on 4‑2‑1710, Dek (1970) writes «Siegen 4‑3‑1710», confirmed by the parish registers of Siegen and the notification of birth kept in the State Archives Marburg (4f Nassau-Siegen, Nr. 241 (7)), dated Siegen 4‑3‑1710: «diesen Morgen um acht Uhr».") – Nassauischer Hof, Siegen, 25 December 1710 (Note: "Definitely deceased in Siegen from where a notification was sent on 25‑12‑1710: «heute früh um halb 6 Uhr» (see State Archives Marburg (4f Nassau-Siegen, Nr. 241).")).
3. Wilhelmine Charlotte Louise (Note: Huberty, et al. (1981), p. 355 names her Charlotte Wilhelmine. The given name Wilhelmina Charlotta Luisa in Menk (2004), p. 201; Wilhelmina Charlotte Louise in Dek (1970), p. 97; Wilhelmine Charlotte Luise in Lück & Wunderlich (1956), p. 35 and Wilhelmina Charlotta Louisa in Vorsterman van Oyen (1882), p. 129.) (Nassauischer Hof, Siegen, 25 April 1711 – Untere Schloss, Siegen, 7 March 1771 (Note: "See Gazette de France 1771, p. 101, dépêche from Vienna 13‑3‑1771: «On mande de Siegen que Charlotte Guillemine de Nass… y est morte le 7 de ce mois». The State Archives Wolfenbüttel preserves (2 Alt 264) a notification dated Wittgenstein 9‑3‑1771, which announces the death «am 7. dieses».")).
4. Augusta Amelie (Note: Given name according to Huberty, et al. (1981), p. 355. The given name Augusta Amelia Albertina Henriëtte Elisabeth in Dek (1970), p. 97 and Augusta Amalia Albertina Henrietta Elisabeth in Vorsterman van Oyen (1882), p. 129.) (Siegen, 9 September 1712 – Wittgenstein Castle, Laasphe, 22 February 1742), married in Siegen on 6 May 1738 to Count Frederick of Sayn-Wittgenstein-Hohenstein (Note: Names according to Huberty, et al. (1981), p. 355. The names Karel Frederik Willem van Sayn-Wittgenstein in Dek (1970), p. 97 and Carel Frederik Willem van Sayn-Wittgenstein-Hohenstein in Vorsterman van Oyen (1882), p. 129.) (Berlin, 29 January 1708 – 9 June 1756). He later remarried the youngest sister of Augusta Amelie.
5. Louis Ferdinand (Nassauischer Hof, Siegen, 29 March 1714 – Nassauischer Hof, Siegen, 26 February 1715).
6. Caroline Amelie Adolphina (Note: "The baptismal certificate names her Charlotte Amélie Adolphine. In the notification of death «Charlotte» is changed into «Caroline».") (Siegen, 26 November 1715 – Laubach, 10 August 1752), married at Wittgenstein Castle in Laasphe on 11 February 1751 to Count Christian August of Solms-Laubach (Wetzlar, 1 August 1714 – Laubach, 20 February 1784).
7. William Maurice (Nassauischer Hof, Siegen, 1 March 1717 – Nassauischer Hof, Siegen, 5 August 1719).
8. Elizabeth Hedwig (Siegen, 19 April 1719 – Wittgenstein Castle, Laasphe, 10 January 1789), married in Siegen on 12 June 1743 to Count Frederick of Sayn-Wittgenstein-Hohenstein (Berlin, 29 January 1708 – 9 June 1756). He was the widower of an older sister of Elisabeth Hedwig.
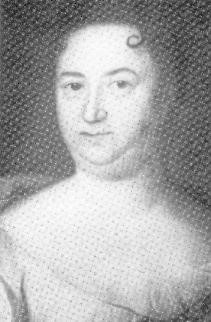
Duchess Amalie Louise of Courland (1687–1750). Detail of an anonymous portrait, 18th century. Siegerlandmuseum, Siegen.

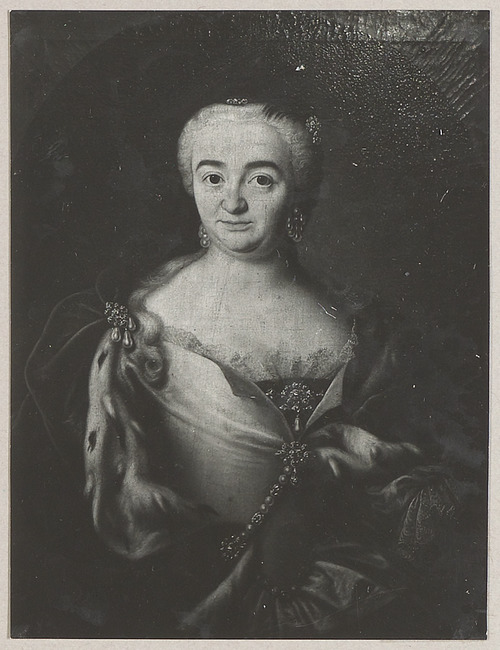
Princess Augusta Amelie of Nassau-Siegen (1712–1742). Portrait by Johann Philipp Behr, 1738. Siegerlandmuseum, Siegen.

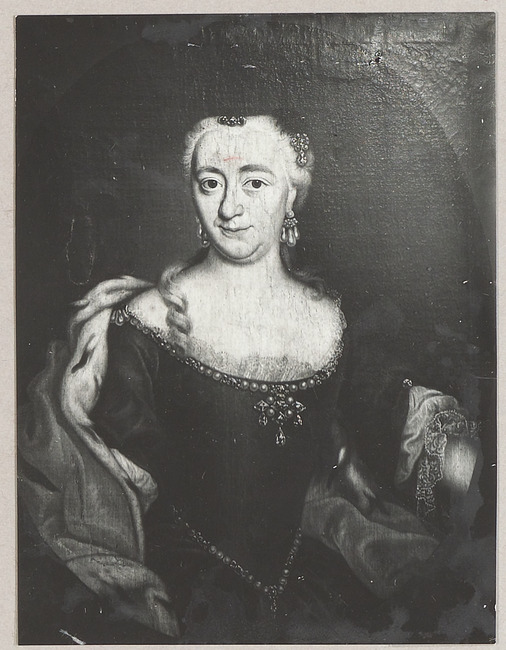
Princess Caroline Amelie Adolphina of Nassau-Siegen (1715–1752). Portrait by Johann Philipp Behr, 1738. Siegerlandmuseum, Siegen.

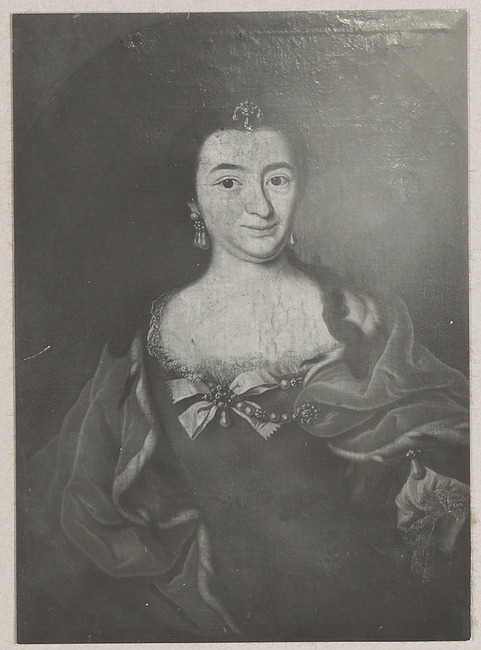
Princess Elizabeth Hedwig of Nassau-Siegen (1719–1789). Portrait by Johann Philipp Behr, 1738. Siegerlandmuseum, Siegen.

== Ancestors ==
Ancestors of Frederick William Adolf, Prince of Nassau-Siegen
Great-great-grandparents	John VI 'the Elder' of Nassau-Siegen (1536–1606) ⚭ 1559; Elisabeth of Leuchtenberg (1537–1579)	John 'the Younger' of Schleswig-Holstein-Sonderburg (1545–1622) ⚭ 1568; Elisabeth of Brunswick-Grubenhagen (1550–1586)	Jobst of Limburg-Stirum (1560–1621) ⚭ 1591; Mary of Holstein-Schauenburg-Pinneberg (1559–1616)	Arnold IV of Bentheim-Tecklenburg (1554–1606) ⚭ 1573; Magdalena of Neuenahr-Alpen (1553–1627)	George 'the Elder' of Nassau-Dillenburg (1562–1623) ⚭ 1584; Anne Amelie of Nassau-Saarbrücken (1565–1605)	Louis I of Sayn-Wittgenstein (1532–1605) ⚭ 1567; Elisabeth of Solms-Laubach (1549–1599)	Wilhelm Eppelmann (ca. 1564–1592) ⚭ 1576; Anna Lange (?–1636)	Johann Wilhelm von Efferen genannt Hall (?–?) ⚭ Margarethe von der Baalen genannt Bleck (?–?)
Great-grandparents	John VII 'the Middle' of Nassau-Siegen (1561–1623) ⚭ 1603; Margaret of Schleswig-Holstein-Sonderburg (1583–1658)		George Ernest of Limburg-Stirum (1593–1661) ⚭ 1603; Magdalene of Bentheim-Tecklenburg (1591–1649)		Louis Henry of Nassau-Dillenburg (1594–1662) ⚭ 1615; Catharine of Sayn-Wittgenstein (1588–1651)		Peter Melander (1589–1648) ⚭ 1638; Agnes von Efferen genannt Hall (?–1656)	
Grandparents	Henry of Nassau-Siegen (1611–1652) ⚭ 1646; Mary Magdalene of Limburg-Stirum (1632–1707)				Adolf of Nassau-Schaumburg (1629–1676) ⚭ 1653; Elisabeth Charlotte Melander (1640–1707)			
Parents	William Maurice of Nassau-Siegen (1649–1691) ⚭ 1678; Ernestine Charlotte of Nassau-Schaumburg (1662–1732)							

== Sources ==
- Aßmann, Helmut & Menk, Friedhelm (1996). Auf den Spuren von Nassau und Oranien in Siegen (in German). Siegen: Gesellschaft für Stadtmarketing Siegen e.V.
- Behr, Kamill (1854). Genealogie der in Europa regierenden Fürstenhäuser (in German). Leipzig: Verlag von Bernhard Tauchnitz.
- De Clercq, Carlo (1962). "Die katholischen Fürsten von Nassau-Siegen". Nassauische Annalen (in German). Vol. Band 73. Wiesbaden. pp. 129–152.
- Dek, A.W.E. (1962). Graf Johann der Mittlere von Nassau-Siegen und seine 25 Kinder (in German). Rijswijk: Krips Repro.
- Dek, A.W.E. (1968). "De afstammelingen van Juliana van Stolberg tot aan het jaar van de Vrede van Münster". Spiegel der Historie. Maandblad voor de geschiedenis der Nederlanden (in Dutch). 1968 (7/8): 228–303.
- Dek, A.W.E. (1970). Genealogie van het Vorstenhuis Nassau (in Dutch). Zaltbommel: Europese Bibliotheek.
- von Ehrenkrook, Hans Friedrich; Förster, Karl & Marchtaler, Kurt Erhard (1928). Ahnenreihen aus allen deutschen Gauen. Beilage zum Archiv für Sippenforschung und allen verwandten Gebieten (in German). Görlitz: Verlag für Sippenforschung und Wappenkunde C.A. Starke.
- Huberty, Michel; Giraud, Alain & Magdelaine, F. & B. (1976). l'Allemagne Dynastique (in French). Vol. Tome I: Hesse-Reuss-Saxe. Le Perreux: Alain Giraud.
- Huberty, Michel; Giraud, Alain & Magdelaine, F. & B. (1979). l'Allemagne Dynastique (in French). Vol. Tome II: Anhalt-Lippe-Wurtemberg. Le Perreux: Alain Giraud.
- Huberty, Michel; Giraud, Alain & Magdelaine, F. & B. (1981). l'Allemagne Dynastique (in French). Vol. Tome III: Brunswick-Nassau-Schwarzbourg. Le Perreux: Alain Giraud.
- Huberty, Michel; Giraud, Alain & Magdelaine, F. & B. (1994). l'Allemagne Dynastique (in French). Vol. Tome VII: Oldenbourg-Familles alliées H-L. Le Perreux-sur-Marne: Alain Giraud.
- Knetsch, Carl (1931). Das Haus Brabant. Genealogie der Herzoge von Brabant und der Landgrafen von Hessen (in German). Vol. II. Teil: Die Nachkommen Philipps des Grossmütigen. Darmstadt: Historischer Verein für das Großherzogtum Hessen.
- Lück, Alfred (1981) [1967]. Siegerland und Nederland (in German) (2nd ed.). Siegen: Siegerländer Heimatverein e.V.
- Lück, Alfred & Wunderlich, Hermann (1956) [1952]. Die Fürstengruft zu Siegen (in German). Siegen: Verkehrsverein Siegen e.V.
- Menk, Friedhelm (1966). "Die erste Gemahlin von Friedrich Wilhelm Adolf Fürst zu Nassau-Siegen, eine geborene Landgräfin zu Hessen-Homburg". Siegerland (in German). Band XLIII (Heft 3): 94.
- Menk, Friedhelm (1971). Quellen zur Geschichte des Siegerlandes im niederländischen königlichen Hausarchiv (in German). Siegen: Stadt Siegen/Forschungsstelle Siegerland.
- Menk, Friedhelm (2004). "Die Fürstengruft zu Siegen und die darin von 1669 bis 1781 erfolgten Beisetzungen". In Burwitz, Ludwig; Menk, Friedhelm; Opfermann, Ulrich Friedrich; Pfau, Dieter & Plaum, Bernd D. (eds.). Siegener Beiträge. Jahrbuch für regionale Geschichte (in German). Vol. 9. Siegen: Geschichtswerkstatt Siegen – Arbeitskreis für Regionalgeschichte e.V. pp. 183–202. ISSN 1431-6684.
- Spielmann, Christian (1909). Geschichte von Nassau (Land und Haus) von den ältesten Zeiten bis zur Gegenwart (in German). Vol. Teil 1. Politische Geschichten. Wiesbaden: P. Plauen.
- Gräfin zu Stolberg-Stolberg, Sophie Eleonore & von Arnswaldt, Werner Konstantin (1927–1935). Katalog der fürstlich Stolberg-Stolberg'schen Leichenpredigten-Sammlung (in German). Leipzig: Verlag Degener & Co.
- Textor von Haiger, Johann (1617). Nassauische Chronik (in German). Herborn: Christoph Raab.
- Vorsterman van Oyen, A.A. (1882). Het vorstenhuis Oranje-Nassau. Van de vroegste tijden tot heden (in Dutch). Leiden/Utrecht: A.W. Sijthoff/J.L. Beijers.

Frederick William Adolf, Prince of Nassau-Siegen House of Nassau-Siegen (Protestant branch) Born: 20 February 1680 Died: 13 February 1722
Regnal titles
Preceded by William Maurice	Fürst of Nassau-Siegen; 23 January 1691^{Jul.} – 13 February 1722	Succeeded by Frederick William II
Preceded by William Maurice	Count of Bronkhorst, Lord of Wisch, Borculo, Lichtenvoorde and Wildenborch, Hereditary Knight Banneret of the Duchy of Guelders and the County of Zutphen; 23 January 1691^{Jul.} – 13 February 1722	Succeeded by Frederick William II
