= August David zu Sayn-Wittgenstein-Hohenstein =

Prussian politician (1663–1735)

Graf August David of Sayn-Wittgenstein-Hohenstein (14 April 1663 – 1735) was a Prussian politician. He was a member of the Cabinet of Three Counts, with Johann Kasimir Kolbe von Wartenberg and Alexander Hermann, Count of Wartensleben, also known due to their heavy taxation as "the great W(oes)" of Prussia (Wartenberg, Wartensleben, Wittgenstein). As a favorite of Johann Kasimir Kolbe von Wartenberg, he was later imprisoned at Spandau Citadel, fined 70,000 thalers and banished subsequently by Frederick William due to corruption, wastage and inefficiency.

== Early life ==
He was born as a third son of Count Gustav zu Sayn-Wittgenstein-Hohenstein and his wife, Huguenot noblewoman Anna Helene de la Place, daughter of François de La Place, Vicomte de Machaut and Anna Margaretha of Brederode.

== First marriage ==
He married first in 1703 in Weilburg to Countess Concordia zu Sayn-Wittgenstein-Vallendar (1679-1709). He had following children:

1. His first daughter was Charlotte Sophie of Sayn-Wittgenstein-Hohenstein (1705-1787), married in 1726 Count Christian Nikolaus Johann von Bar (died in 1765): no issue

2. His second child was Count Friedrich Sayn-Wittgenstein-Hohenstein (1708-1756), who married firstly in 1738 Princess Auguste Amalie Albertine Henriette Elisabeth von Nassau-Siegen (1712-1742). After her death he married for the second time her sister Princess Elisabeth Hedwig von Nassau-Siegen (1719-1789). He had issue from both marriages.

3. His second daughter Sophie Polyxena Concordia of Sayn-Wittgenstein-Hohenstein (28 May 1709 in Berlin – 15 December 1781 in Siegen) married Frederick William II, Prince of Nassau-Siegen, on 23 September 1728, and had five daughters:

- Charlotte Sophia Louise (6 June 1729 – 2 April 1759) married on 30 September 1748 to Count Charles Peter Ernest of Bentheim und Steinfurt (younger line)
- Frederica Wilhelmine (3 April 1730 – 18 November 1733)
- Mary Eleonore Concordia (2 March 1731 – 20 April 1759). She died of smallpox in the house of the preacher Theodore Diederich Henrich Wever in Kamen
- Frederica Augusta Sophia (1 June 1732 – 23 March 1733)
- Anne Charlotte Augusta (19 June 1734 – 9 June 1759)

== Second marriage ==
After the death of his first wife, he married for the second time Countess Albertine Amalie zu Leiningen-Westerburg (1686-1723). With her he had a son:

1. Count Heinrich Ernst August zu Sayn-Wittgenstein (1715-1792), who married his cousin Countess Friederike Louise Wilhelmine zu Sayn-Wittgenstein-Sayn (1726-1792); had issue

== Bibliography ==
- Werner Schmidt: Friedrich I. - Kurfürst von Brandenburg, König in Preußen, Heinrich Hugendubel Verlag, München 2004, ISBN 3-424-01319-6
