= Cabinet of Three Counts =

The Cabinet of Three Counts (German - Drei-Grafen-Kabinett) was an unofficial triumvirate which dominated the politics of the Kingdom of Prussia from 1702 to 1710.

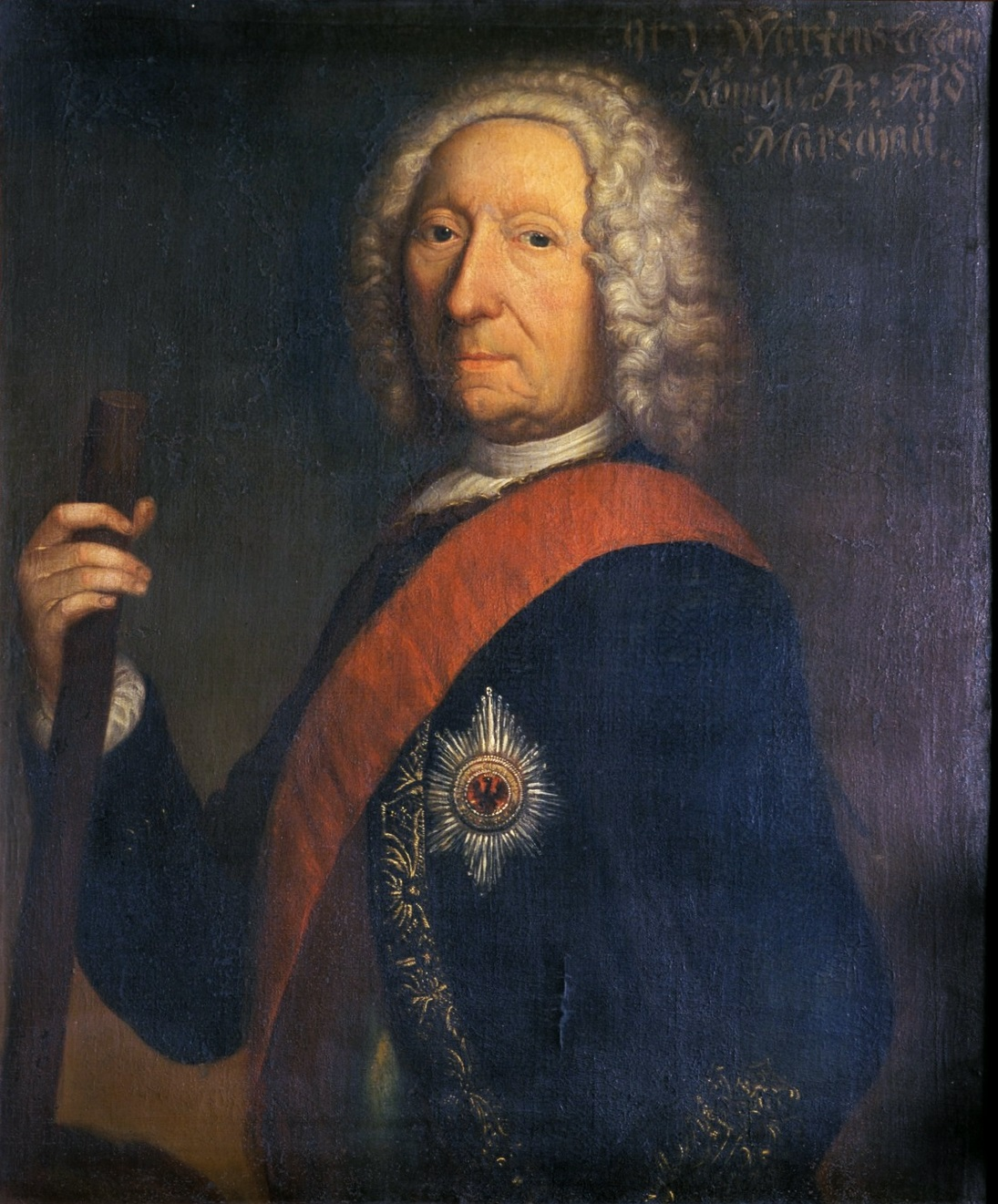
Alexander Hermann, Count of Wartensleben

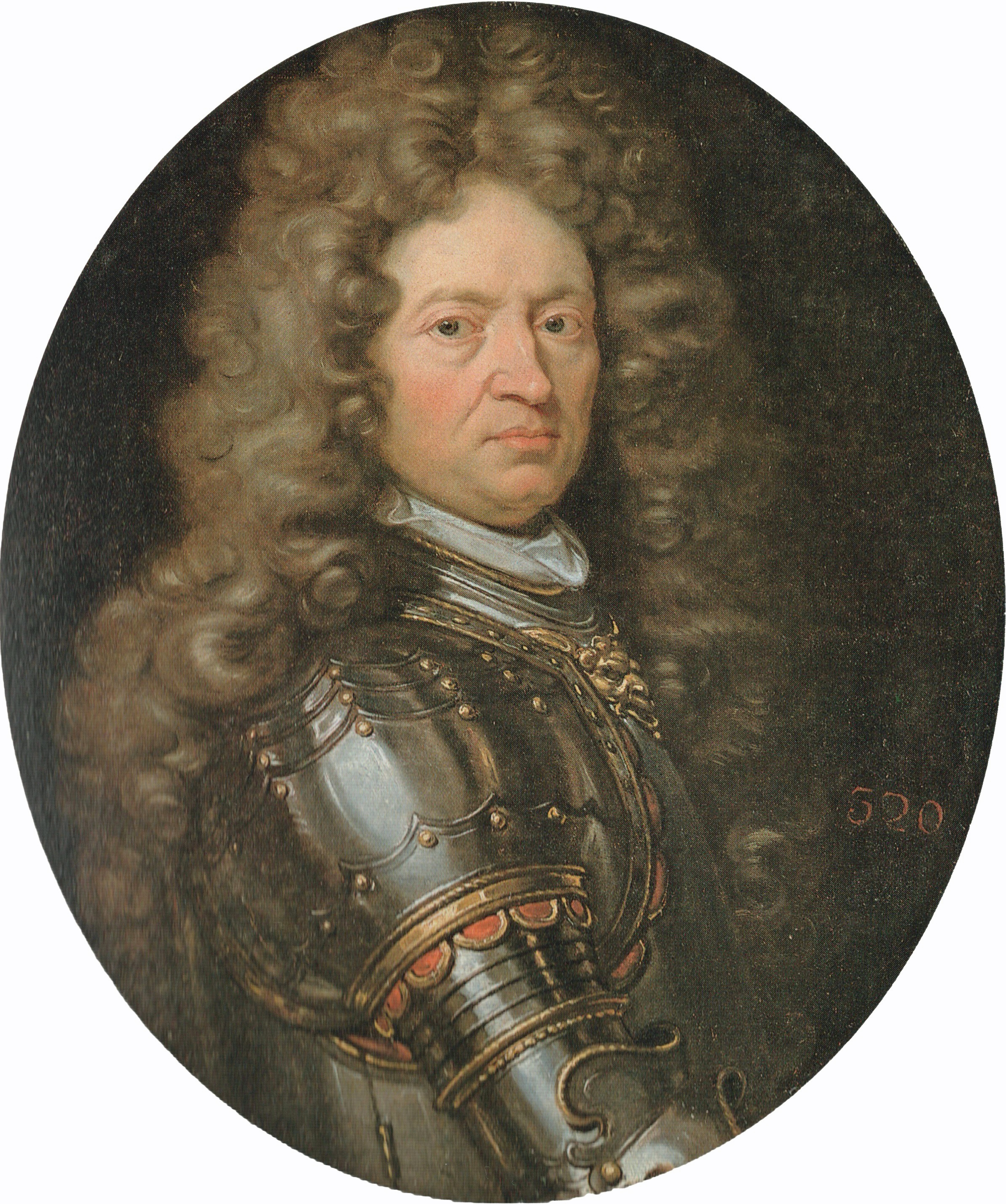
Johann Kasimir Kolbe von Wartenberg

It was made up of Alexander Hermann, Count of Wartensleben, August David zu Sayn-Wittgenstein-Hohenstein and Johann Kasimir Kolbe von Wartenberg. It was also known as "the three Ws" or "the three Woes" of Prussia (Wartenberg, Wittgenstein, Wartensleben) reflecting their bad reputation among the population who saw them as corrupt ministers ruining the country by creating new taxes while lining their own pockets.

It was Kolbe who helped the Brandenburg Elector Frederick III to gain the title of King in Prussia in 1701. In return he was awarded the title Count of Wartenberg and the office of Prime Minister in 1702. The king interfered little in Wartenberg's dealings who gave the post of Geheimer Rat (equivalent to Privy Councillor) to General Field Marshal Wartensleben while the Count of Wittgenstein was charged with the finances of the state. Taxes on consumption (the so called Akzise) and land were raised drastically and new taxes, e.g. for wigs, hats, boots, socks, and coaches, were introduced. For the consumption of tea, coffee, and hot chocolate two Thalers per year had to be paid. Unmarried women had to pay a "maiden tax" and poorer people were especially hard hit by a tax on salt.

It was only after the plague of 1709 and the famine that went with it, that an independent report uncovered the extent of the cabinet's corruption. First, Frederick had Wittgenstein arrested and incarcerated at the Spandau Citadel near Berlin with the crowd accompanying the coach that brought him there and shouting he should be hanged - he was set free again, though, after he paid a hefty fine. Wartenberg was dismissed but was granted an annual pension and left Prussia for Frankfurt am Main where he died in 1712. Wartensleben only had to give up his military offices but otherwise remained in power and continued to serve under Frederick's successor Frederick William I.

== Sources ==
- Samuel Buchholz: Versuch einer Geschichte der Churmark Brandenburg, Vierter Teil: neue Geschichte, Berlin 1767, Seiten 350-353
- Werner Schmidt: Friedrich I. - Kurfürst von Brandenburg König in Preußen, Heinrich Hugendubel Verlag, München 2004
- PreußenJahrBuch - Ein Almanach, MD-Berlin, Berlin 2000
- Günter Barudio: Weltgeschichte - Das Zeitalter des Absolutismus und der Aufklärung 1648-1779, Band 25, Weltbild Verlag, Augsburg 1998, ISBN 3-89350-989-5
- Gustav Adolf Harald Stenzel: Geschichte des Preussischen Staats, Dritter Teil, Verlag Friedrich Perthes, Hamburg 1841
