= Johann Kasimir Kolbe von Wartenberg =

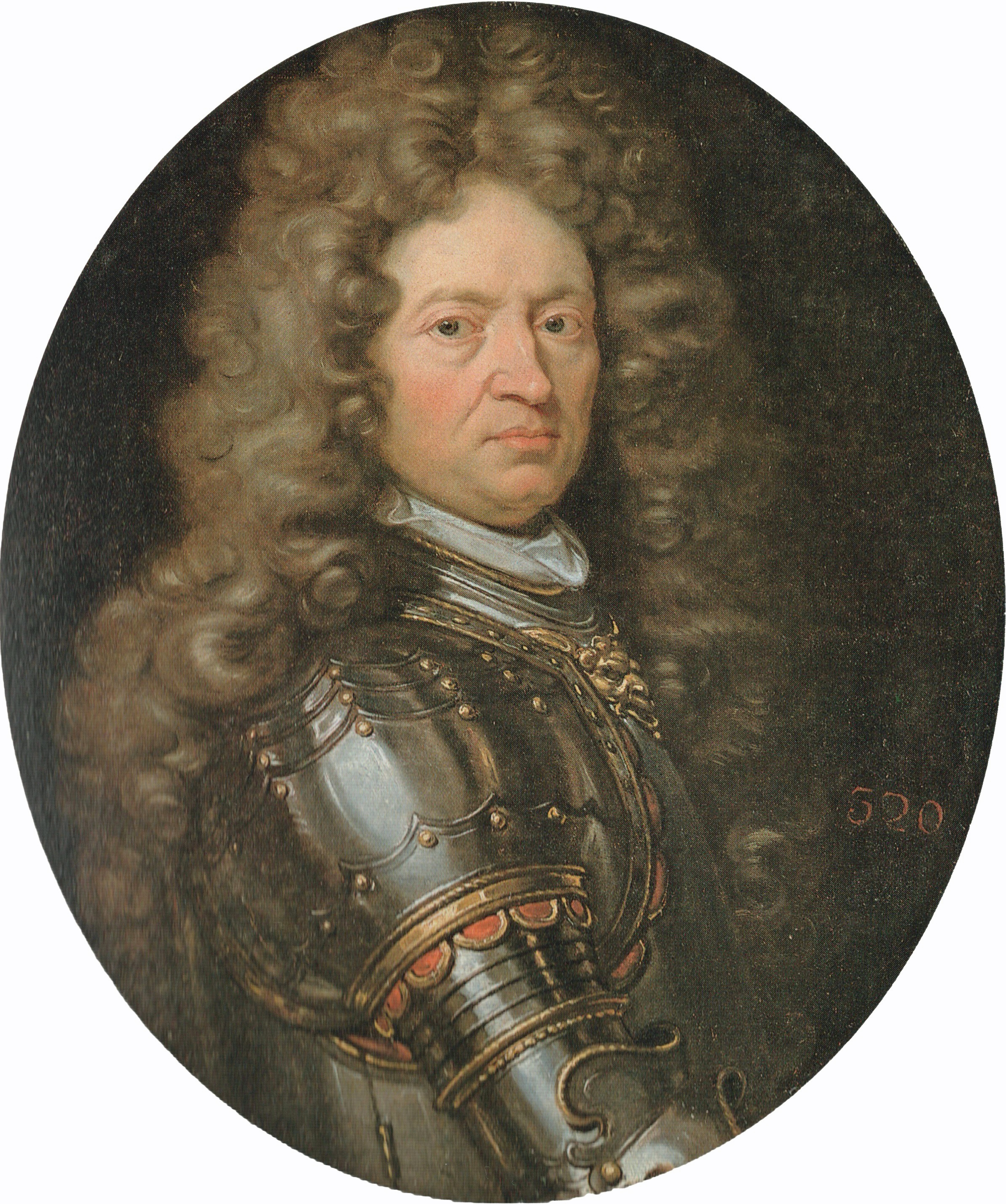
Johann Kasimir Kolbe, Reichsgraf of Wartenberg

Johann Kasimir Kolbe, Graf von Wartenberg (6 February 1643, in Wetterau – 4 July 1712, in Frankfurt am Main) was the first ever Minister-President (effectively Prime Minister) of the Kingdom of Prussia, and the head of the "Cabinet of Three Counts".

== Life ==
In his youth he was Oberstallmeister and Geheimer Rat in the council of Mary of Orange (1642–1688), sister-in-law of the Great Elector and wife of Pfalzgraf Ludwig Heinrich von Simmern (1640–1674). On her death he transferred to the service of Frederick III of Brandenburg, where he rose quickly through the ranks - in 1691 he became Schlosshauptmann of Berlin, in 1694 Hauptmann der Dompropstei Havelberg, in 1696 Oberstallmeister and Oberkammerherr.

On the fall of first minister Eberhard von Danckelmann in 1697 he became minister and finance minister and quickly eliminated his competitors Hans Albrecht von Barfus and Paul von Fuchs via targeted intrigue and filled important court posts with his henchmen. On 18 January 1701, at Frederick's coronation in Königsberg, it was Johann who was allowed to place the purple cloak on him, and in the same year he became prime minister. His course was marked by a proliferation in the offices he was awarded - along with those already mentioned, he also held the offices of marshal of the kingdom of Prussia, protector of the Royal Academy, chancellor of the Order of the Black Eagle, Oberstallmeister, Oberaufseher of the royal castles, Oberhauptmann of all the Schatullenämter, postmaster general. Moreover, he did not hold these offices one after the other, but instead all at once, in a kind of personal union, thus making him able to fill the court with systematic corruption and enrich himself shamelessly.

He was also assisted by his wife Catharina Rickert (1670, Lobith - 1734, The Hague). She was of middle-class origin, as the daughter of a tax collector for the Brandenburg court to the Duchy of Cleves in Emmerich am Rhein. She came to Berlin as wife to Kammersekretär Peter Biedekap and there fell in love with Johann. After their marriage, she became the king's official mistress. Johann's son Kasimir (1699) later became a general under Frederick William I of Prussia.

In 1704 the king successfully petitioned the Holy Roman Emperor to promote Johann to the rank of Reichsgraf of Wartenberg. Johann and his ministers, Oberhofmarschall Graf August von Wittgenstein (14 April 1663 – 1735) and Generalfeldmarschall Graf Alexander Hermann von Wartensleben (1650–1734) − the "three great W(oes)" of Prussia (Wartenberg, Wartensleben, Wittgenstein) – raised and wasted national taxation. For example, Johann made August Reichsgraf zu Sayn-Wittgenstein director of salt mines in 1705, and then used the opportunity to raise the salt tax and thus increase his receipts. He also introduced taxes on wigs, hats, stockings and carriages, as well as the precursor of a coffee tax (whoever wanted tea, coffee or cocoa had to acquire a license, costing two taler a year). Wartenberg was also a member of the "der Bessere" company.

As the population's troubles mounted, crown-prince Frederick William intervened and Johann's cabal fell. In 1711 Johann was released from government service and retired to his estates.

== Sources ==
- (in German) Siegfried Isaacsohn: Johann Kasimir Kolbe, Graf von Wartenberg. In: Allgemeine Deutsche Biographie (ADB). Bd. 16, Leipzig 1882, S. 463–65.
- (in German) Johann Kasimir Kolbe von Wartenberg. Article in: Meyers Konversations-Lexikon, 4. Aufl. 1888–1890, Bd. 16, S. 403 f.
- (in German) Uwe Kieling, Johannes Althoff: Das Nikolaiviertel. Spuren der Geschichte im ältesten Berlin. Berlin-Edition, Berlin 2001, ISBN 3-8148-0080-X, S. 74–78.
