= Haxthausen =

Haxthausen is a surname. Notable people by that name include:

- August von Haxthausen (1792–1866), German agricultural scientist
- Aurore von Haxthausen (1830–1888), Swedish author, composer, and pianist
- Frederik Gottschalk von Haxthausen (1750–1825), Danish-Norwegian army officer, councillor of state and cabinet member
- Gregers Christian Haxthausen (1732–1802), Danish courtier and county governor
- Holger Haxthausen (1892–1959), Danish professor of dermatology
