= Friedrich Wilhelm Quirin von Forcade de Biaix =

Prussian military officer

His Excellency Lieutenant General, Sir Friedrich Wilhelm Quirin von Forcade de Biaix
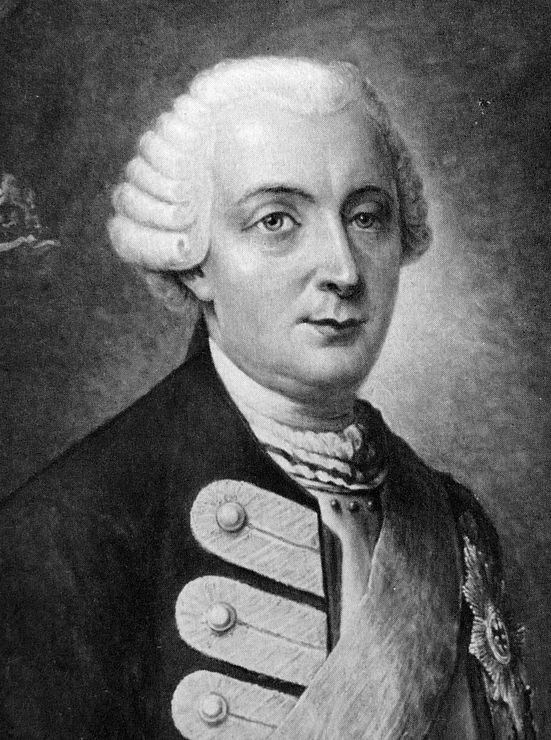
- Portrait c. 1758
- Born: Quirin Frideric de Forcade; 11 January 1699; Berlin, Brandenburg
- Died: March 23, 1765 (aged 66); Berlin, Brandenburg
- Burial place: Family vault in the crypts under the Garnisonkirche, Berlin (before 1949); Südwestkirchhof Stahnsdorf (after 1949)
- Title: Domherr of Havelberg; Drost in Neuenrade; Amtshauptmann of Zinna; President of the Ober-Collegium Sanitatis; Lieutenant governor of Breslau
- Spouse: Marie de Montolieu, Baroness de Saint-Hippolyte (1727)
- Children: 23, of which 4 stillborn, most notably: Friedrich Wilhelm von Forcade de Biaix; Charlotte Sophie Therese Marthe von Forcade; Georg Friedrich Wilhelm von Forcade de Biaix; Friedrich Heinrich Ferdinand Leopold von Forcade de Biaix
- Parent(s): Lieutenant General Sir Jean de Forcade de Biaix and Juliane Freiin von Hoenstedt
- Military career
- Allegiance: Prussia
- Branch: Prussian Army
- Rank: Lieutenant General
- Units: 1st White Fusilier Guards, under the 1st Prussian Infantry Regiment (1713-1721); 23rd Prussian Infantry Regiment (1721-1757)
- Commands: 23rd Prussian Infantry Regiment (14 July 1748); Commandant of Berlin (14 July 1748); Adjutant General to King Frederick the Great (24 December 1756); Prussian Infantry at the Battle of Breslau (16 February 1757)
- Conflicts: Great Northern War; First Silesian War; Second Silesian War; Seven Years' War
- Awards: Knight of the Order of Pour le Mérite; Knight of the Order of the Black Eagle
- Memorials: Equestrian statue of Frederick the Great, north facing commemorative plaque

Friedrich Wilhelm Quirin von Forcade de Biaix, baptized Quirin Frideric de Forcade, aka Friedrich Quirin von Forcade, aka Frédéric Quérin de Forcade (11 January 1699 – 23 March 1765) was a Prussian military officer, the second son of Jean de Forcade de Biaix, an early Huguenot immigrant to Brandenburg-Prussia and a descendant of the noble family of Forcade. He was one of Frederick the Great's most active and most treasured officers. He was wounded three times and once left for dead on the battlefield. Together with his wife, he fathered 23 children.

He was Regimentschef of the 23rd Prussian Infantry Regiment, recipient of the Kingdom of Prussia's highest military order of merit for heroism, Knight of the Order of Pour le Mérite, Knight of the Order of the Black Eagle, Canon (German: Domherr) of Havelberg, Castellan (German: Drost) in Neuenrade in the County of Mark, Lord Seneschal (German: Amtshauptmann) of Zinna, President of the Ober-Collegium Sanitatis in Berlin and Lieutenant governor of Breslau.

In 1851, his name was place on the north facing commemorative plaque on the Equestrian statue of Frederick the Great in Berlin.

== Early life ==
Friedrich Wilhelm Quirin von Forcade de Biaix was the second son of Lieutenant General Jean de Forcade de Biaix (1663–1729) and his wife, the Baroness Juliane von Honstedt, daughter of the Major General Baron Quirin von Honstedt, from Württemberg but in the service of Prussia. His baptismal Godfather was Frederick I of Prussia.

His father was a Huguenot religious exile who was among the earliest arrivals in Brandenburg-Prussia, after the revocation of the Edict of Nantes by the Edict of Fontainebleau in October 1685. Unlike his father and his eldest brother, choosing to not abjure from his Calvinist beliefs, he left his native Béarn in France for Brandenburg-Prussia, where Frederick I of Prussia, then Elector of Brandenburg, was not only encouraging, but actively facilitating, Huguenot immigration.

Von Forcade is erroneously referred to in some Prussian 19th century historical sources as the Marquis de Biaix, but for neither his father or him there is evidence that he was a marquis. Biaix was not a marquisate, but rather a noble house. He was also never the Seigneur de Biaix; that title, inherited from the grandfather who purchased the Biaix Manor in 1659, went to h is father's eldest brother and then to his son.

== Military career ==
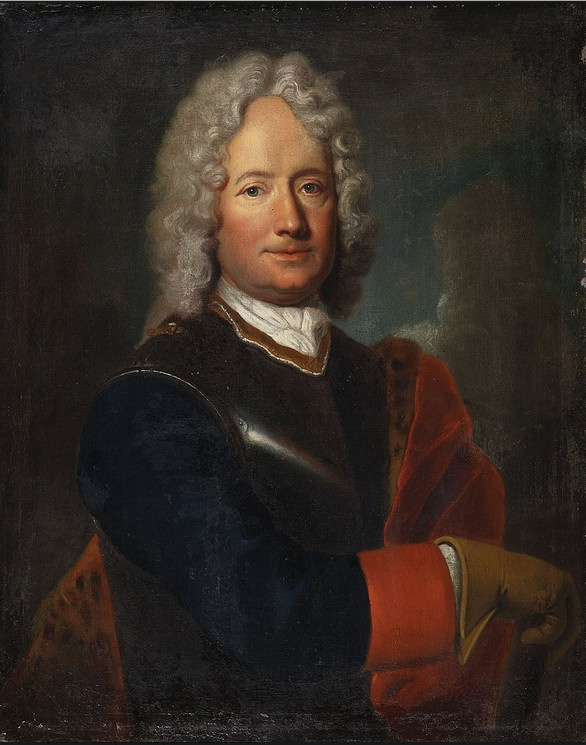
Portrait of a Regimental Commander, probably Johann Quirin von Forcade; by Antoine Pesne, date unknown, before 1757.

The lives and careers of both Friedrich Wilhelm Quirin von Forcade de Biaix and his father are intricately linked to the history of the 23rd Prussian Infantry Regiment, founded in 1713 and disbanded in 1806. Forcade spent the majority of his career on the infantry side of this regiment. The regiment also included a company of Grenadiers, the 2nd Grenadier Company. It was garrisoned in Berlin from 1716 until 1806. He later commanded the entire regiment, including the Grenadiers, for 17 years, (14 July 1748 - 23 March 1765). His father commanded the regiment during 13 years (February 1716 - 2 February 1729). During much of its existence, as well as more than 200 years after, it was referred to as Forcade's Regiment. The Regiment is immortalized in the German military marching composition "Das Regiment Forcade" that was in use as late as World War II.

Forcade entered Prussian military service in 1713 during the reign of King Frederick William I of Prussia (1713–40), beginning what would become one of the most notable military careers in the history of the Kingdom of Prussia, spanning some 53 years, and further serving under King Frederick the Great (1740–65).

- 21 September 1713, appointed as a Fähnrich, an entry-level commissioned officer with the Grenadiers of the Weiße Füsilier-Leibgarde Nr. 1, in the 1st Prussian Infantry Regiment, aka General Field Marshall Count von Wartensleben's Infantry Regiment (in 1788, called von Bornstedt's Regiment).

=== Great Northern War (1715) ===
Following Brandenburg-Prussia's declaration of war against Sweden in the summer of 1715, Forcade fought in the Pomeranian Campaigns. He fought at the Siege of Stralsund (15 June 1715 - 23 December 1715), where he was wounded for the first time, the storming of the Peenemuende Lair (21–22 August 1715) and on Rügen Island (16–18 November 1715).

- 11 January 1716, promoted to second lieutenant.
- Promoted on 26 May 1719 to first lieutenant.
- 24 January 1721, promoted to captain in his father's Regiment, the 23rd Prussian Infantry Regiment. At the time, still commonly referred to as the Regiment von Sydow.
- In 1732, promoted to major in the same regiment.
- Promoted to lieutenant colonel in 1740.

=== First Silesian War (1740–1742) ===
He fought near Glogau (29 December 1740 - 2 January 1741), Breslau (29 December 1740 - 2 January 1741), Ottmachau Palace (12 January 1741), Troppau (23 January 1740), Graetz (25 January 1741), the Battle of Mollwitz (10 April 1741), at Neisse (19 October 1741 - 31 October 1741), Laa (12 March 1742), Bruenn (31 March 1742 - 3 April 1742), Austerlitz (10 April 1742) and Wartha (25–26 May 1742).

- 30 May 1743, promoted to colonel.
- In June 1743, he was appointed Amtshauptmann von Zinna (the civil official heading the Zinna district government).

=== Second Silesian War (1744–1745) ===
Forcade and the 23rd Prussian Infantry Regiment fought at Prague (2–18 September 1744), Pless aka Josephstadt (27 November 1744), Patschkau (27 December 1744) the Battle of Hohenfriedberg (4 June 1745), Gross- and Klein Bocken (31 July 1745), around Neustadt in Böhmen (11–12 September 1745), at the Battle of Soor (30 September 1745) and at Trautenbach and Schatzlar (16 October 1745).

The regiment lost its Regimentschef, Major General Wolf Alexander Ernst Christoph von Blanckensee, at the Battle of Soor. Forcade himself, was shot through the calf of his right foot. Badly wounded, he was left for dead on the battlefield. King Frederick the Great attributed the glory of the victory to him for his actions on the battlefield that day, and, on 6 January 1746, awarded him the Kingdom of Prussia's highest order of merit, the Pour le Mérite, as well as a pension of 600 Thaler and the title of Canon (Domherr) of Havelberg.

Another episode in 1746 demonstrates just how much King Frederick the Great treasured Forcade. During a ritual presentation at court at the Berlin Palace, Forcade had to lean on a window because of his wounded right foot. The King personally brought him a chair, graciously saying: "My dear Colonel von Forcade, so brave and worthy a man, as He is, well deserves that even the King himself brings him a chair."

- In 1747, on occasion of the baptism of his son, Friedrich Heinrich Ferdinand Leopold, the King Frederick the Great was the Godfather. As a gift, the King ordered von Forcade to accept the title of Drost zu Neuenrade (the Official responsible for the militarily administrative district of Neuenrade) in the County of Mark with the royal command that it be later transferred to the child.
- May 1747, promoted to major general, with rank retroactive to 4 December 1743.
- Appointed on 14 July 1748 as Regimentschef of his father's old regiment, the 23rd Prussian Infantry Regiment, at the time also referred to as Donha's Regiment, after his predecessor, Count Christoph zu Dohna.

=== Seven Years' War (1754–1763) ===
Forcade commanded his regiment in early engagements near Pirna (11 September 1756 - 16 October 1756).

- 10 February 1757, promoted to lieutenant general.

Forcade and the 23rd Prussian Infantry Regiment were particularly active during the Seven Years' War.

==== 1757 ====
He commanded his regiment, fighting alongside of his men, at

- the Battle of Reichenberg near Kratzau (21 April 1757); Infantry
- the Battle of Prague (6 May 1757 - 20 June 1757); Infantry and Grenadiers
- Aussig (27/29 July 1757); Infantry and Grenadiers
- Kotta (24 August 1757); Grenadiers
- Markranstädt (29 October 1757); Infantry and Grenadiers
- the Battle of Rossbach (5 November 1757); Infantry and Grenadiers
- the Battle of Leuthen (5 December 1757); Infantry and Grenadiers
- Klein-Mochbern and Maria-Höfchen, near Breslau (6 December 1757); Grenadiers
- the Siege of Breslau (7–20 December 1757); Infantry
- Nikolaivorstadt at Görlitz (12 December 1757); Infantry
- Landeshut (22 December 1757); Grenadiers

Forcade's infantry lost 600 men during each of the battles at Prague and Leuthen.

- On 7 December 1757, after commanding the Battle of Leuthen in which distinguished himself beyond description, he was awarded the Knight of the Order of the Black Eagle.

When the King took possession of Leuthen, he personally wrote of von Forcade:

English translation: "My dear Lieutenant General von Forkade. I know that he has endured much at this siege, and it is our fortune because of him, that we were soon able to become masters of the city, because he otherwise, without my being able to help or relieve him, would have had to endure even more. So I thank him for it, and because he endured the most here : so shall he also alone have the honor from it. So, I herewith award him not only the Order of the Black Eagle, but also appointed him as Lieutenant governor of Breslau. I have awarded the vacant {command of} the Bremen Grenadier Company in Golz' Regiment to his eldest son, who is my Adjutant, because he well deserves it".

==== 1758 ====
- Holice in Bohemia (11–12 July 1758); Infantry
- the Battle of Zorndorf (25 August 1758); Infantry and Grenadiers
- the Battle of Jenkwitz (11 October 1758); Infantry
- the Battle of Hochkirch (14 October 1758); Infantry and Grenadiers

Forcade was wounded again at the Zorndorf. The Prussians lost 12,800 men, the Russians lost 18,000 men at Zorndorf. Forcade lost 1,600 of his men that day, 800 each from his infantry and Grenadiers, as well as the Grenadier's commanding officer, Major Ernst Sigismund von Wedell.

He again lost 1,600 of his men again at Hochkirch, 800 each from his infantry and Grenadiers, where the Prussians were defeated on the battlefield.

==== 1759 ====
- the Battle of Friedland in Bohemia (9 September 1759); Infantry

During this successful battle, Forcade's infantry took 700 prisoners and destroyed an important munitions depot.

==== 1760 ====
- in April 1760, he marched the regiment to Pomerania and forced the Russian General Tottleben to retreat from the province to the Polish border.
- the Siege of Dresden (13–22 July 1760); Infantry and Grenadiers
- Adelsdorf (9 August 1760); Grenadier
- the Battle of Liegnitz (15 August 1760); Infantry and Grenadiers
- Hochgiersdorf (17 September 1760); Grenadier
- Schöna (2 November 1760); Grenadier
- the Battle of Torgau (3 November 1760); Infantry and Grenadiers

At the Battle of Torgau, Forcade lost 15 officers and more than 600 men.

==== 1761 ====
- Schwadronschef (Rittmeister) of the 2nd Grenadier Company under Prince Augustus Ferdinand of Prussia.
- an entrenched camp near Bunzelwitz (20 August 1761 - 25 September 1761); Infantry

==== 1762 ====
- 1762, commanded a special corps under Prince Henry of Prussia in Saxony.
- the Battle of Grethen (9 March 1762); Grenadiers

Although Forcade's Grenadiers won the Battle of Grethen against 4,000 Austrians, they lost their commanding officer, Major Joachim Friedrich von Rathenow, who died from his wounds a week after the battle.

- Döbeln (12 May 1762); Grenadiers
- Marches between Frauenstein and Tharandt Forest: Klingenberg, Beerwalde Mill, Rothenbach Mill, Lehn-Mill (15 May 1762); Grenadiers
- the Siege of Schweidnitz (4 August 1762 - 10 October 1762); Infantry
- Brand (15 October 1762); Grenadiers
- the Battle of Freiberg (29 October 1762)

=== The Treaty of Hubertusburg ===
In 1763, following the Treaty of Hubertusburg, he received a gift of 8,000 Thaler from King Frederick the Great.

A cabinet order of the King on 19 May 1763 created a War Tribunal, presided over by Lieutenant General von Forcade, together with Lieutenant Generals von Wedell, von Czetteritz and von Wylich.

=== Final Years ===
The proverb "Brave wie Forcade" (Brave like Forcade) became a standard expression of valor in the Prussian Army during the 18th century. "Das Regiment Forcade (hat nie ein Feind besiegt)" (lyrics by Georg von Kries, melody by Hans Hertel, 1906) was long a standard, at times mandatory, composition in the German military song repertoire.

=== Legacy ===
Following his death in 1765, his widow received a handwritten letter in French from King Frederick the Great, praising him.

He was interred following a state funeral where he was given a vault for himself and his family in the crypts under the Old Garrison Church in Berlin, which was destroyed during the allied bombing of Berlin on 23 November 1943.

In 1851, General von Forcade was immortalized on the north facing commemorative plaque on the Equestrian statue of Frederick the Great in Berlin.

== Family ==
=== Coat of arms ===
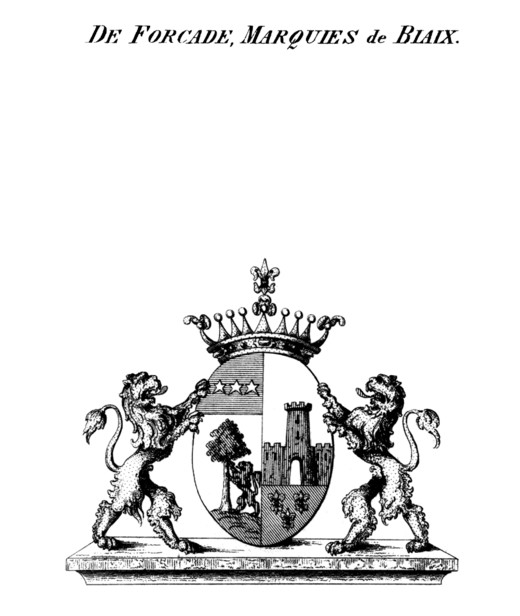
Coat-of-Arms, Forcade, Marquies de Biaix, Prussian Branch, pre-1856

The family motto of the Prussian branch is "In Virtute Pertinax".

Coat of Arms: An escutcheon with the field divided into four parts. Left half: argent tincture, a gules lion holding a sinople eradicated oak tree between its paws; azure tincture charged with three or mullets; Right half: a gules castle with three towers on an argent tincture; sinople tincture charged with three argent roses below it. A Grafenkrone (Count's coronet) as helmut on top of the escutcheon, crested with a or fleur-de-lis. Two or lions supporting the escutcheon. Motto: "In Virtute Pertinax".

Heraldic Symbolism: The lion symbolizes courage; the eradicated oak tree symbolizes strength and endurance; the towers are symbols of defense and of individual fortitude; the mullets (5-star) symbolizes divine quality bestowed by god; the rose is a symbol of hope and joy; the fleur-de-lis is the floral emblem of France; the coronet is a symbol of victory, sovereignty and empire. A Count's coronet to demonstrate rank and because the family originally served the counts of Foix and Béarn during the English Wars in the Middle Ages.

=== Marriage ===
Friedrich Wilhelm Quirin von Forcade de Biaix originally intended to marry a daughter of French Baron François Mathieu Vernezobre de Laurieux (1690–1748). The rich baron and his family had left Paris after the collapse of John Law's Mississippi Company in 1720 and befriended King Frederick William I of Prussia. When the King ordered Vernezobre to marry his daughter to von Forcade de Biaix, who she rejected, the marriage was only averted when Vernezobre agreed to undertake the construction of a prestigious city residence for the King, referred to as the Vernezobre'sche Palais, located at Husarenstraße 102, later renamed in his honor to Wilhelmstrasse 102, after the King's death in 1740.

He subsequently married on 7 October 1727 at the French Cathedral in Berlin with 18 year old Baroness Marie de Montolieu de St.-Hippolyte aka Maria von Montaulieu, Freiin von St.-Hippolyte (* 23 August 1709, Berlin; † 15 September 1767, Berlin), the youngest daughter of Sardinian and Prussian Major General Louis de Montolieu, Baron de Saint-Hippolyte (* about 1667, Saint-Hippolyte-de-Caton, France; † 23 August 1738, Berlin), also a Huguenot exile. From their marriage and until their respective deaths, the couple maintained a fixed residence and home in Berlin.

=== Children ===
Over a period of 25 years, the couple had 23 children, including four said to be stillborn. Eleven survived their father, of which four were sons. Known are:

1. Friedrich Wilhelm von Forcade de Biaix (* 23 July 1728, Berlin; † 3 September 1778, Frankfurt/Oder), the eldest son, Royal Prussian Colonel, Schwadronschef (Rittmeister) of the 2nd Grenadier Company in the 24th Prussian Infantry Regiment, and, after 1 July 1761, acting Regimentschef of the [24th Prussian Infantry Regiment] garrisoned in Frankfurt/Oder, recipient of the Kingdom of Prussia's highest military order of merit for heroism, Knight of the Order of Pour le Mérite He was presented for baptism on 23 August 1728 at the French Temple in Berlin-Friedrichstadt by none less than the King, Frederick William I of Prussia and Major General Jean de Forcade de Biaix, the paternal grandfather, together his Godfathers. Also present at the baptism were the Princess Johanna Charlotte von Anhalt-Dessau, Margrave Douairière and widow of Margrave Philip William of Brandenburg-Schwedt, Countess Anna Sophia von Treskow, second wife of General Field Marshal Count Alexander Hermann von Wartensleben, and Susan de Pelissier, wife of Major General Louis de Montolieu, Baron de Saint-Hippolyte and the child's the maternal grandmother, collectively his Godmothers.
2. Louis von Forcade de Biaix (* 20 August 1729, Berlin; † 19 January 1737, Berlin). The child was presented for baptism on 27 August 1729 at the French Temple in Berlin-Friedrichstadt by Louis de Montolieu, Baron de Saint-Hippolyte, major general in the service of the King of Prussia and Lieutenant Marshal in the service of Philip V of Spain, King of Sardinia, the child's maternal grandfather, and by Dame Julie von Honstedt, widow of Lieutenant General Jean de Forcade de Biaix, his paternal grandmother, his Godparents.
3. Charlotte Sophie von Forcade de Biaix (* 30 July 1730, Berlin; † 15 March, 1794, Ober Langenöls, Silesia), ∞ 29 July 1748 in Berlin-Garnisonkirche with Heinrich Siegismund von Eberhard († 5 March 1757). She was presented for baptism on 8 August 1730 in her parents' home in Berlin by Baron Friderich Charles, de Montolieu, the King's Chamberlain and the child's maternal uncle, and by Dame Philippine Sophie de Forcade de Biaix, wife of Major Paul Albrecht de Glereau (sometimes written de Gleveau) and the child's paternal aunt, his Godparents.
4. Louise Susanne von Forcade de Biaix (* 4 December 1731, Berlin) ∞ on 17 November 1756 in Berlin with Carl Bernhard Feriherr von Prittwitz und Gaffron (* 29 March 1735; † 7 September 1786, Berlin). She was presented for baptism on 14 December 1731 at the French Temple in Berlin-Friedrichstadt by Forcade's commanding officer Colonel Egidius Ehrentreich von Sydow, Baron Eberhard Wilhelm von Honstedt, Louise Charlotte von Sturm, wife of Colonel Christian Reinhold von Derschau, and by Susanne de Montolieu, Baroness de Saint-Hippolyte, wife of Lieutenant Colonel Henri le Chenevix de Beville and the child's maternal aunt, collectively the Godparents.
5. Christian Louis von Forcade de Biaix (* 3 January 1733, Berlin; † 27 April 1739, Berlin). The child was presented for baptism on 14 December 1731 at the French Temple in Berlin-Friedrichstadt by Monseigneur the Margrave Christian Louis, Baron Johann Gottfried von Cocceji, Minister of State (German: Staatsminister, French: Ministre d'État), Gertrud von Haeseler, wife of Ehrenrich Bogislaus von Creutz, Minister of State (German: Staatsminister, French: Ministre d'État) and Cabinet Secretary under King, Frederick William I of Prussia, and by Anna Charlotte von Brandt, wife of General Egidius Ehrentreich von Sydow, collectively his Godparents.
6. Twin: Albertine Marthe von Forcade de Biaix, the elder twin (* 25 February 1734, Berlin; † 10 May 1734, Berlin). The child was presented for baptism on 7 March 1734 at the French Temple in Berlin-Friedrichstadt by the General Field Marshal Count Albrecht Konrad Finck von Finckenstein and by Madame Marthe de Rocoulle (sometimes de Rocoulles, de Roukoul), Grand Governess (French: Grande gouvernante, German: Oberhofmeisterin) to the royal family, a Huguenot refugee who arrived in Berlin as the widow of Esaie du Maz de Montbail in 1685.
7. Twin: Françoise Wilhelmine von Forcade de Biaix, the younger twin (* 25 February 1734, Berlin; † 25 May 1734, Berlin). The child was presented for baptism on 7 March 1734 at the French Temple in Berlin-Friedrichstadt by Johann Moritz von Viebahn, Minister of State (German: Staatsminister, French: Ministre d'État) and Auditor General of the Prussian Army in the Department of Criminal Affairs, and by Miss Sophia Wilhelmine von Kameke, Lady in Waiting (French: Dame d'Honneur) to the Queen of Prussia, Sophia Dorothea of Hanover, daughter of Paul Anton von Kameke, the Grand Master of the King's wardrobe (French: Grand-maître de la garde-robe du roi) and his wife, Ilse Anna von Brünnow, the Grande Maîtresse to the royal household.
8. Elisabeth Marie Henriette Quirin von Forcade de Biaix (* 21 December 1735, Berlin; † 24 September 1774, Klieken, Saxony-Anhalt; buried 27 September 1774, Berlin-Spandau), ∞ 22 August 1756 with Lieutenant General Philipp Friedrich Lebrecht von Lattorff (* 29 December 1733, Klieken; † 15 July 1808, Klieken). She was presented for baptism on 5 January 1734 at the French Temple in Berlin-Friedrichstadt by Prince Henry of Prussia, Lieutenant General Count Friedrich Sebastian Wunibald Truchsess zu Waldburg, by the Duke of Holstein (believed to actually be Frederick Ernest of Brandenburg-Kulmbach), by the Princess Sophia Dorothea of Prussia, by the Margrave Douairière Louise Charlotte of Brandenbourg, née Duchess of Courland, and by Christiane Freiin Wolfskeel von Reichenberg, aka Madame von Katsch, Grand Governess (French: Grande gouvernante, German: Oberhofmeisterin) to the Queen and widow of Christoph von Katsch, First Minister of Justice, collectively her Godparents.
9. Guillaume Henry Leopold Philippe von Forcade de Biaix (* 1737, Berlin; † 23 July 1737, Berlin). He was presented for baptism on 10 March 1737 at the French Temple in Berlin-Friedrichstadt by General Field Marshal Friedrich Wilhelm von Grumbkow, Minister of State (German: Staatsminister, French: Ministre d'État), Count Heinrich von Podevils, Minister of State (German: Staatsminister, French: Ministre d'État), Leopold August von Wülknitz, Chamberlain and later Hofmarschall to the King, Lieutenant Colonel Philippe de Brueys, Baron de Bézuc, Margarethe Elisabeth von Rhetz (sometimes von Reetz), widow of Lieutenant General David Gottlob von Gersdorff, and by the wife of the Chamberlain von Morian, collectively his Godparents.
10. Sophie Mariane Louise von Forcade de Biaix (* 2 November 1738, Berlin; † 26 January 1739, Berlin). She was presented for baptism on 15 November 1737 at the French Temple in Berlin-Friedrichstadt by Monseigneur Frederick, Margrave of Brandenburg-Bayreuth, Friederike Sophie Wilhelmine, Margravine of Brandenburg-Bayreuth, his wife, Adam Otto von Viereck, Paul Anton von Kameke, and the Baroness von Montzinger, the Baroness Luise Susanne von Beschefer, wife of Baron Ludwig Kasimir von und zu Hertefeld and daughter of Huguenot Lieutenant General Jacob de Bechefer, aka Jakob von Beschefer, Commandant of Magdeburg, collectively her Godparents.
11. Caroline Albertine Louise von Forcade de Biaix (* 2 December 1739, Berlin; † 22 August 1739, Hohenfinow, Barnim, Brandenburg), ∞ before 1766 with three time widower Baron Matthieu de Vernezobre de Laurieux (* 15 April 1721, Paris; † 28 April 1782, Hohenfinow), married in his first marriage with Charlotte Henriette Amalie von Cocceji (* 5 August 1729; † 4 October 1757). She was presented for baptism on 15 December 1739 at the French Temple in Berlin-Friedrichstadt by Monseigneur Charles William Frederick, Margrave of Brandenburg-Ansbach, Count General Field Marshal Christoph Wilhelm von Kalckstein, her first cousin once removed Captain Isaac de Forcade de Biaix, Countess Charlotte Albertine Finck von Finckenstein, wife of Colonel Friedrich Wilhelm von Kannenberg, Sophia Albertine von Creutz, wife of Royal Adjutant General Count Hans Christoph Friedrich von Hacke, and the wife of Gerhard Heinrich von Wolden, Chamberlain to Frederick William, Margrave of Brandenburg-Schwedt and later Hofmarschall in Rheinsberg to Frederick the Great, collectively her Godparents.
12. Christophle Louis von Forcade de Biaix (* 24 March 1741, Berlin; † 2 November 1768, Jakarta, Indonesia). He was presented for baptism on 3 April 1741 at the French Temple in Berlin-Friedrichstadt by Christoph II., Burggrave and Count of Dohna-Schlodien Lord Steward of the Household (German: Obersthofmeister, French: Grand Maître de la cour) of Queen Sophia Dorothea of Hanover, by Count Friedrich Ludwig von Wartensleben, the Queen's Hofmarschall (French: Maréchal de la cour), by Baron von Müller, Queen Elisabeth Christine of Brunswick-Wolfenbüttel-Bevern's Chamberlain, by Johanna Charlotte von Beschefer, wife of Minister of State (German: Staatsminister, French: Ministre d'État) Samuel von Cocceji and daughter of Huguenot Lieutenant General Jacob de Bechefer, aka Jakob von Beschefer, Commandant of Magdeburg, by Katharina Dorothea Charlotte von Erlach, wife of Leopold August von Wülknitz, queen mother Sophia Dorothea of Hanover's Hofmarschall (French: Maréchal de la cour), elevated on 5 November 1742 to Count, and the Countess Anne Friederike von Kameke, wife of Leopold Alexander von Wartensleben, Adjutant General to the King. He died on 2 November 1768 in Jakarta, Indonesia, while employed as a sergeant for the Dutch East India Company on his first voyage. There is some evidence, although inconclusive, that he may have married a Marguerite Dubeau from Bitburg, and had at least one son, Johann Baptiste von Forcade, born in Berlin about 1765, who immigrated to Québec and married there in 1787.
13. Leopoldine Augustine Anne Charlotte von Forcade de Biaix (* 24 August 1742, Berlin; † 7 May 1784, Königsberg, East Prussia), ∞ about 1766 with Carl Ludwig von Koschembahr (* 10 June 1723, Postelwitz, Duchy of Oels; † 16 December 1781, Königsberg, East Prussia), Royal Prussian Lord Steward of Forests (German: Oberforstmeister). She was presented for baptism on 3 September 1742 at the French Temple in Berlin-Friedrichstadt by Leopoldine Marie of Anhalt-Dessau, wife of Frederick Henry, Margrave of Brandenburg-Schwedt, Princess Marie Auguste of Thurn and Taxis, Duchess of Württemberg, by Anne de Bezuc, Baroness de Verfeuil, wife of Monsieur Alexandre de la Tour du Pin-Gouvernet, Baron de Verfeuil and sister of Colonel Philippe de Brueys, Baron de Bezuc, by Marguerite Charlotte le Chenevix de Beville, widow of Colonel Philippe de Brueys, Baron de Bezuc, Governor of Neuchâtel, Knight of the Ordre de la Générosité, by Catherine de Thibaud, wife of Conseiller de cour Aymar de Montolieu de Saint-Hippolyte, and by Major Duclos, collectively her Godparents.
14. Charlotte Sophie Therese Marthe von Forcade de Biaix (* 25 October 1743, Berlin; † 23 March 1799, Steinfurth near Bad Nauheim), First Lady-in-Waiting (German: Erste Ehrendame, French: Première Dame d'honneur) to the Princess of Prussia, ∞ 29 September 1775 in Berlin-Friedrichstadt with Baron Johann Hugo Wilhelm Löw von und zu Steinfurth (* 25 August 1750, Lübz; † 23 May 1786, Steinfurth near Bad Nauheim), Royal Prussian Chamberlain and Knight of the Order of Joseph. She was presented for baptism on 7 November 1743 at the French Temple in Berlin-Friedrichstadt by Charles Eugene, Duke of Württemberg, the Minister of State (German: Staatsminister, French: Ministre d'État) Friedrich Wilhelm von Borck and the Grand Squire (French: Grand Écuyer) Friedrich Wilhelm von Roeder, by Sophie-Caroline de Brandt, aka the Countess de Camas, Grand Governess (French: Grande gouvernante, German: Oberhofmeisterin) of the court of Queen Elisabeth Christine and widow of Paul de Camas, formerly the Prussian Ambassador to Paris and a close personal friend of the French Enlightenment writer, historian, and philosopher, Voltaire, Dorothea von Trzebitzky, aka the Countess Truchsess zu Waldburg, wife of Lieutenant General Count Friedrich Sebastian Wunibald Truchsess zu Waldburg, and by Mademoiselle Marthe de Montbail, collectively her Godparents.
15. Georg Friedrich Wilhelm von Forcade de Biaix, baptized Friedrich Wilhelm von Forcade de Biaix (* 19 October 1746, Berlin; † 31 August 1811, Wohlau, Silesia), later referred to as the second son, Royal Prussian Major in the 1st Hussar Regiment; married before 1783 with Johanna Sophia Zippelius (* 8 June 1755; † 21 August 1802, Winzig near Breslau, Silesia). He was presented for baptism on 29 October 1746 at the French Temple in Berlin-Friedrichstadt by Major General Georg Konrad von der Goltz on behalf of King Frederick the Great, by Prince Augustus William of Prussia, Prince of Prussia, by General Field Marshal Count Samuel von Schmettau, by Major General Count Hans Christoph Friedrich Graf von Hacke, by Princess Luise Amelie of Brunswick-Wolfenbüttel, wife of the Prince of Prussia, by Princess Anna Amalia of Prussia, by Madame von Blaspigel, Grand Governess (French: Grande gouvernante, German: Oberhofmeisterin) to Princess Anna Amalia of Prussia, and by Anna von Brünnow, aka the Countess von Kameke, widow of Paul Anton von Kameke, collectively his Godparents.
16. Friedrich Heinrich Ferdinand Leopold von Forcade de Biaix (* 19 December 1747, Berlin; † 12 October 1808, Schleibitz Manor, Oels, Silesia), the third son, retired Royal Prussian Lieutenant Colonel, participated in the Rhine Campaigns, recipient of the Kingdom of Prussia's highest military order of merit for heroism, Knight of the Order of Pour le Mérite (1774), Castellan in Neuenrade in the County of Mark after his father's death; ∞ 15 April 1782 at Ossen Manor in Oels, Silesia to Johanna Christine Wilhelmine von Koshembahr und Skorkau from the house of Ossen (* 13 January 1761, Ossen Manor in Oels, Silesia; † 9 July 1816, Breslau, Silesia). He was presented for baptism on 13 January 1748 at the French Temple in Berlin-Friedrichstadt on behalf of the King Frederick the Great by the Duke of Holstein and Governor of Berlin Frederick Ernest of Brandenburg-Kulmbach, Messeigneurs Prince Henry of Prussia and Prince Augustus Ferdinand of Prussia, the King's brothers, the Reigning Prince Leopold II, Prince of Anhalt-Dessau, the General Field Marshal Count Kurt Christoph von Schwerin, Infantry Major General Baron Heinrich August de la Motte Fouqué, and Burgrave and Count Christoph II., von Dohna-Schlodien, collectively his Godfathers. The Godmothers were Princess Leopoldine Marie of Anhalt-Dessau, wife of Frederick Henry, Margrave of Brandenburg-Schwedt, Marie Johanna von Riffer, aka the Countess von Schmettau, wife of General Field Marshal Samuel von Schmettau, Countess Maria Anna Finck von Finckenstein, wife Minister of State (German: Staatsminister, French: Ministre d'État) Adam Otto von Viereck, Countess Sophia Henrietta von der Schulenburg wife of Count Heinrich von Podevils, and Mademoiselle Auguste-Marie-Bernardine von Tettau, First Dame d'atour to Queen Elisabeth Christine of Brunswick-Wolfenbüttel-Bevern and daughter of Lieutenant Colonel Karl von Tettau.
17. Albertine Wilhelmine von Forcade de Biaix (* between September 1748 and June 1749, presumably Berlin; † 12 August 1777, Heiligengrabe-Techow, Prignitz, Brandenburg), secular Canoness of the Convent of the Holy Sepulcher in Heiligengrabe, ∞ 12 April 1776 in Heiligengrabe-Techow with Pastor Gottlieb Joachim Hindenberg (* about 1736, Haselberg, Wriezen, Märkisch-Oderland; † 6 September 1803, Heiligengrabe-Techow)
18. Leonore Wilhelmine Albertine Susanne von Forcade de Biaix (* 9 August 1750, Berlin). She was baptized on 30 August 1750 at the French Temple in Berlin-Friedrichstadt. Her Godparents were the Count von Besse, General Field Marshal Alexander Hermann Count von Wartensleben, Baron Johann Georg von Reisewitz, Squire (French: Écuyer, German: Stallmeister) to Prince Henry of Prussia, the Queen Mother's Lord Marshall (German: Oberhofmarschall French: Grand-Maréchal), Baron Ernst Maximilian von Reist Sweerts (sometimes von Sverts and von Schwertz), Director of the Berlin Opera, Countess Eleonora Lucia von Ilten, widow of Georg Christoph von Schlieben, Grand Huntsman (German: Oberjägermeister French: Grand veneur), Charlotte Wilhelmine von Grävenitz, widow of Major General Georg Konrad von der Goltz, the widow of Baron von Klessing, and Countess Eleonore Louise Albertine von Schlieben, widow of Baron Dietrich Cesarion von Keyserlingk and formerly Lady-in-Waiting (German: Ehrendame, French: Dame d'honneur) to Queen Elisabeth Christine. She may have married a von Woldeck. Historical literature published in 1799 about the Huguenot community in Prussia make specific reference to such a marriage, but without precision as to whether it was a daughter or a sister of Friedrich Wilhelm Quirin von Forcade de Biaix.
19. Wilhelmine Friederike von Forcade de Biaix (* 18 March 1753, Berlin; † 26 March 1759, Berlin). She was presented for baptism on 13 January 1748 at the French Temple in Berlin-Friedrichstadt by Princess Wilhelmina of Hesse-Kassel, wife of Prince Henry of Prussia, Prince Frederick of Prussia, the Count de Bredow, Lord Steward of the King's Wardrobe (French: Grand-maître de la garde-robe du roi), Baron Friedrich Wilhelm von Kannenberg, Lord Steward of the Household (German: Oberhofmeister, French: Grand-maître) of Queen Elisabeth Christine of Brunswick-Wolfenbüttel, Crown Princess of Prussia, Lieutenant Colonel von Königsmark, the Countess von Schwerin, Governess to Princess Anna Amalia of Prussia, Countess Charlotte Sophie von Aldenburg, aka the Countess von Bentinck, Countess von Bess, and Countess Sophie Henriette Susanne Finck von Finckenstein, from the house of Gilgenburg, wife of Count Karl-Wilhelm Finck von Finckenstein, collectively her Godparents.

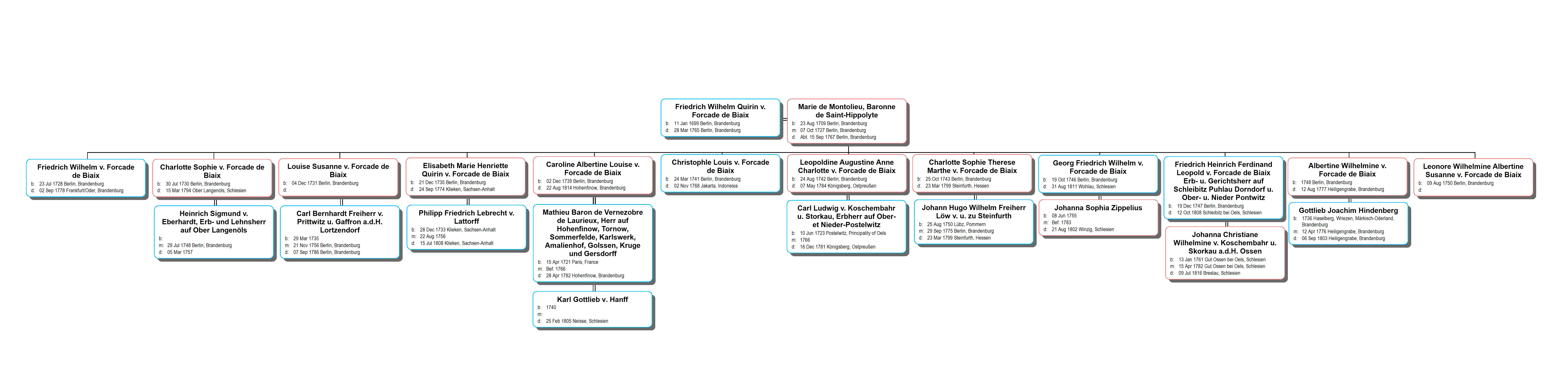
Children of Friedrich Wilhelm Quirin von Forcade de Biaix who survived into adulthood, with their respective spouses.

== Literature ==
- Ebers, Johann, The New And Complete Dictionary Of The German And English Languages: composed chiefly after the German Dictionaries of Mr. Adelung and of Mr. Schwan / 1: ... Containing the Letters A - G of the German Alphabet explained in English, Leipzig 1796 (in German and English)
- Ebers, Johann, The New And Complete Dictionary Of The German And English Languages: composed chiefly after the German Dictionaries of Mr. Adelung and of Mr. Schwan / 2: ... Containing the Letters H - R of the German Alphabet explained in English, Leipzig 1796 (in German and English)
- Ebers, Johann, The New And Complete Dictionary Of The German And English Languages: composed chiefly after the German Dictionaries of Mr. Adelung and of Mr. Schwan / 3: ... Containing the Letters S - Z of the German Alphabet explained in English, Leipzig 1796 (in German and English)
- Fahrenkrüger, Johann Anton: Nathan Bailey's Dictionary English-German and German-English — Englisch-Deutsches und Deutsch-Englisches Wörterbuch. Gänzlich umgearbeitet. Zweiter Theil. Deutsch-Englisch. Zehnte, verbesserte und vermehrte, Auflage., Friedrich Frommann, Leipzig und Jena 1801 (in German and English) Retrieved 11 May 2017
- Ledebur, Leopold von (1854). Adelslexicon der preußischen Monarchie (application/PDF) (in German). Vol. 1. A – K. Berlin: Ludwig Rauh. p. 225 – via Heinrich Heine Universität Düsseldorf Universitäts- und Landesbibliotek.
- Lehmann, Gustaf: Die Ritter des Ordens pour le mérite. Auf Allerhöchsten Befehl Seiner Majestät des Kaisers und Königs, bearbeitet im Königlichen Kriegsministerium durch Gustav Lehmann, wirklichen geheimen Kriegsrat und vortragenden Rat im Kriegs-Ministerium, Erster Band: 1740-1811, Berlin 1913 (in German)
- Lehmann, Gustaf: Die Ritter des Ordens pour le mérite. Auf Allerhöchsten Befehl Seiner Majestät des Kaisers und Königs, bearbeitet im Königlichen Kriegsministerium durch Gustav Lehmann, wirklichen geheimen Kriegsrat und vortragenden Rat im Kriegs-Ministerium, Zweiter Band: 1812-1913, Berlin 1913, (in German)
- Preuß, Johann David Erdmann [in German] (1832). "1. Theil. Erstes Buch. Friedrichs des Großen Jugendjahren bis seiner Thronbesteigung." [Part 1. First Book. Frederick the Great's Early Years until his Ascension to the Throne.]. Friedrich der Große: Eine Lebensgeschichte [Frederick the Great: A Life Story.] (application/PDF) (in German). Vol. 1. Band. Mit einem Urkundenbuch. Berlin: Nauck – via Google Books.
- Preuß, Johann David Erdmann [in German] (1832). "1. Theil. Zweites Buch. Friedrichs der Zweite als König von seiner Thronbesetzung bis zum Dresdener Frieden." [Part 1. Second Book. Frederick the Second as King from his Ascension to the Throne until the Treaty of Dresden.]. Friedrich der Große: Eine Lebensgeschichte [Frederick the Great: A Life Story.] (application/PDF) (in German). Vol. 1. Band. Mit einem Urkundenbuche. Berlin: Nauck – via Google Books.
- Preuß, Johann David Erdmann [in German] (1832). "1. Theil. Drittes Buch. König Friedrich als Landesvater und als Mensch. Vom Dresdener Frieden bis zum siebenjährigen Kriege." [Part 1. Third Book. King Frederick as a Sovereign and an Individual. From the Treaty of Dresden until the Seven Years' War.]. Friedrich der Große: Eine Lebensgeschichte [Frederick the Great: A Life Story.] (application/PDF) (in German). Vol. 1. Band. Mit einem Urkundenbuche. Berlin: Nauck – via Google Books.
- Preuß, Johann David Erdmann [in German] (1832). "1. Theil. Anhang I.Beilagen." [Part 1. Appendix I. Supplements.]. Friedrich der Große: Eine Lebensgeschichte [Frederick the Great: A Life Story.] (application/PDF) (in German). Vol. 1. Band. Berlin: Nauck – via Google Books.
- Preuß, Johann David Erdmann [in German] (1832). "2. Theil. Urkundenbuch zum ersten Bande." [Part 2. Documentary Evidence Book to Volume 1.]. Urkundenbuch zu der Lebensgeschichte Friedrichs des Großen [Documentary Evidence Book to the Life Story of Frederick the Great.] (application/PDF) (in German). Vol. 1. Band. Berlin: Nauck – via Google Books.
- Preuß, Johann David Erdmann [in German] (1833). "1. Theil. Viertes Buch. Friedrich der Große im siebenjährigen Kriege." [Part 1. Fourth Book. Frederick the Great in the Seven Years' War.]. Friedrich der Große: Eine Lebensgeschichte [Frederick the Great: A Life Story.] (application/PDF) (in German). Vol. 2. Band. Berlin: Nauck – via Google Books.
- Preuß, Johann David Erdmann [in German] (1833). "2. Theil. Urkundenbuch zum dritten Bande." [Part 2. Documentary Evidence Book to Volume 2.]. Urkundenbuch zu der Lebensgeschichte Friedrichs des Großen [Documentary Evidence Book to the Life Story of Frederick the Great.] (application/PDF) (in German). Vol. 2. Band. Berlin: Nauck – via Google Books.
- Preuß, Johann David Erdmann [in German] (1833). "1. Theil. Fünftes Buch. Friedrich der Große nach dem siebenjährigen Kriege als Landesvater." [Part 1. Fifth Book. Frederick the Great after the Seven Years' War as a Sovereign.]. Friedrich der Große: Eine Lebensgeschichte [Frederick the Great: A Life Story.] (application/PDF) (in German). Vol. 3. Band. Berlin: Nauck – via Google Books.
- Preuß, Johann David Erdmann [in German] (1833). "3. Theil. Urkundenbuch zum dritten Bande." [Part 3. Documentary Evidence Book to Volume 3.]. Urkundenbuch zu der Lebensgeschichte Friedrichs des Großen [Documentary Evidence Book to the Life Story of Frederick the Great.] (application/PDF) (in German). Vol. 3. Band. Berlin: Nauck – via Google Books.
- Preuß, Johann David Erdmann [in German] (1834). "1. Theil. Sechstes Buch. Friedrich der Große in inen späteren politischen und landesväterlichen Sorgen." [Part 1. Sixth Book. Frederick the Great in later Political and Sovereign Problems.]. Friedrich der Große: Eine Lebensgeschichte [Frederick the Great: A Life Story.] (application/PDF) (in German). Vol. 4. Band. Berlin: Nauck – via Google Books.
- Preuß, Johann David Erdmann [in German] (1834). "2. Theil. Urkundenbuch zum vierten Bande." [Part 2. Documentary Evidence Book to Volume 4.]. Urkundenbuch zu der Lebensgeschichte Friedrichs des Großen [Documentary Evidence Book to the Life Story of Frederick the Great.] (application/PDF) (in German). Vol. 4. Band. Berlin: Nauck – via Google Books.
- Preuß, Johann David Erdmann [in German] (1834). Urkundenbuch zu der Lebensgeschichte Friedrichs des Großen [Documentary Evidence Book to the Life Story of Frederick the Great.] (application/PDF) (in German). Vol. 5. Band. Berlin: Nauck – via Google Books.
