= Friedrich Wilhelm von Forcade de Biaix =

Royal Prussian Colonel

Sir Friedrich Wilhelm von Forcade de Biaix
- Born: Frideric Guillaume de Forcade; 23 July 1728; Berlin, Brandenburg
- Died: 2 September 1778 (aged 50); Frankfurt an der Oder, Brandenburg
- Burial place: Garnisonkirchhof, Frankfurt an der Oder "…he rests in the garrison church cemetery at the feet of his General v. Dyringshoven (sic)…"
- Title: Presbyter of the Frankfurt/Oder French Reformed Parish
- Parent(s): His Excellency, Lieutenant General Sir Friedrich Wilhelm Quirin von Forcade de Biaix and Marie de Montolieu, Baronne de St.-Hippolyte
- Military career
- Allegiance: Prussia
- Branch: Prussian Army
- Service years: ca. 1743–1774
- Rank: Colonel
- Units: 24th Prussian Infantry Regiment, aka von Braunschweig Regiment, aka Düringshofen Regiment (ca. 1743–1774)
- Commands: 24th Prussian Infantry Regiment (before 1774); Commandant of Frankfurt/Oder (before 1774)
- Conflicts: Second Silesian War; Seven Years' War
- Awards: Knight of the Order of Pour le Mérite (1774)

Friedrich Wilhelm von Forcade de Biaix, aka Frideric Guillaume de Forcade (born 23 July 1728, Berlin; died 2 or 3 September 1778, Frankfurt an der Oder) was a Kingdom of Prussia Colonel, Schwadronschef (German: Rittmeister) of the 2nd Grenadier Company in the 24th Prussian Infantry Regiment, recipient of the Kingdom of Prussia's highest military order of merit for heroism, Knight of the Order of Pour le Mérite (1774), Commandant of Frankfurt/Oder, and Presbyter of the French congregation of Frankfurt/Oder.

He was the eldest son, of Royal Prussian Lieutenant General Friedrich Wilhelm Quirin von Forcade de Biaix, one of King Frederick the Great's most active and most treasured officers.

He was presented for baptism on 23 August 1728 by none less than His Majesty the King, Frederick William I of Prussia and Major General Jean de Forcade de Biaix, the paternal grandfather, as his godfathers. Also present at the baptism were Her Royal Highness the Princess Johanna Charlotte von Anhalt-Dessau, Margrave Douairière and widow of Margrave Philippe, Anna Sophia von Treskow, Countess von Wartensleben, second wife of General Field Marshal Alexander Hermann Count von Wartensleben, and Susan de Pelissier, wife of Major General Louis de Montolieu de Saint-Hyppolite, the maternal grandmother, all of whom together his godmothers.

== Military career ==
He followed the military tradition of his family and fought in the First Silesian War, the Second Silesian War and the Seven Years' War, climbing to the rank of colonel.

- About 1743, entered Prussian military service.
- 1761, was appointed Schwadronschef (German: Rittmeister) of the 2nd Grenadier Cavalry Company in the 24th Prussian Infantry Regiment.
- 1 July 1761 to 7 April 1763, acting regimental commander (German: Regimentschef) of the 24th Prussian Infantry Regiment garrisoned in Frankfurt/Oder,
- Before 7 September 1774, appointed as commanding officer of the 24th Prussian Infantry Regiment and the Commandant of Frankfurt/Oder.
- 7 September 1774, as a colonel in the 24th Prussian Infantry Regiment under the command of Major General de:Bernhard Alexander von Düringshofen, was awarded the Kingdom of Prussia's highest military order of merit, Knight of the Order of Pour le Mérite and an annual pension of 500 Reichsthaler upon his separation from military service.
- 2 or 3 September 1778, died at his garrison in Frankfurt/Oder.

== Family ==
=== Coat of arms ===
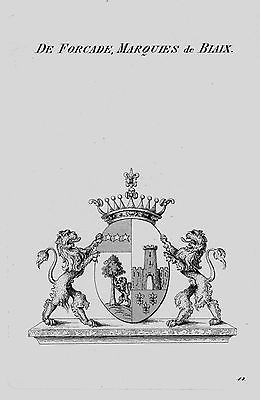
Forcade-Biaix Coat of Arms, Prussian Branch, circa 1820

The family motto of the Prussian branch is "In Virtute Pertinax".

Coat of arms: An escutcheon with the field divided into four parts. Left half: argent tincture, a gules lion holding a sinople eradicated oak tree between its paws; azure tincture charged with three or mullets; Right half: a gules castle with three towers on an argent tincture; sinople tincture charged with three argent roses below it. A Grafenkrone (Count's coronet) as helmut on top of the escutcheon, crested with a or fleur-de-lis. Two or lions supporting the escutcheon. Motto: "In Virtute Pertinax".

Heraldic symbolism: The lion symbolizes courage; the eradicated oak tree symbolizes strength and endurance; the towers are symbols of defense and of individual fortitude; the mullets (5-star) symbolizes divine quality bestowed by god; the rose is a symbol of hope and joy; the fleur-de-lis is the floral emblem of France; the coronet is a symbol of victory, sovereignty and empire. A Count's coronet to demonstrate rank and because the family originally served the counts of Foix and Béarn during the English Wars in the Middle Ages.

=== Parents ===
His father was Friedrich Wilhelm Quirin von Forcade de Biaix (1698–1729), one of King Frederick the Great's most active and most treasured officers. Twice wounded and left for dead on the battlefield, he was Regimentschef of the 23rd Prussian Infantry Regiment, recipient of the Kingdom of Prussia's highest military order of merit for heroism, Knight of the Order of Pour le Mérite, Knight of the Order of the Black Eagle, Canon of Havelberg, Castellan of Neuenrade in the County of Mark, [ord Seneschal of Zinna, President of the Ober-Collegium Sanitatis in Berlin and Lieutenant governor of Breslau. He married in 1727 at the French Cathedral in Berlin with Marie de Montolieu, Baronne de St.-Hippolyte aka Maria von Montaulieu, Freiin von St.-Hippolyte (1709–1767), daughter of Sardinian and Prussian Major General Louis de Montolieu, Baron de St.-Hippolyte († 1738, Berlin), also a Huguenot exile.

=== Marriage ===
Friedrich Wilhelm von Forcade de Biaix never married.

=== Other family ===
- Brother: Georg Friedrich Wilhelm von Forcade de Biaix (1746–1811), the second-born son, Royal Prussian Major in the 1st Hussar Regiment
- Brother: Friedrich Heinrich Ferdinand Leopold von Forcade de Biaix (1747–1808), the third-born son, was a Royal Prussian Lieutenant Colonel, a recipient of the Kingdom of Prussia's highest military order of merit for heroism, Knight of the Order of Pour le Mérite, and Castellan of Neuenrade in the County of Mark.
- Nephew: Friedrich Wilhelm Leopold Konstantin Quirin von Forcade de Biaix, Herr of Schleibitz, Hamm, Groß-Naedlitz and Loslau (1784–1840), retired Royal Prussian Captain, Knight of the Cross of the Royal Prussian Order of St. John (der alte Balley Brandenburg des Ritterlichen Ordens Sankt Johannis vom Spital zu Jerusalem), Knight of the Iron Cross 2nd Class, a recipient of the Kingdom of Prussia's highest military order of merit for heroism, Knight of the Order of Pour le Mérite, Royal Prussian Chamberlain, and Castellan of Neuenrade in the County of Mark
- Nephew: Ferdinand Heinrich von Forcade de Biaix (1787–1835), Royal Prussian Major, Commandant of the 10th Prussian Division's Garrison Company, Knight of the Iron Cross 2nd Class

== Literature ==
- Lehmann, Gustaf: Die Ritter des Ordens pour le mérite. Auf Allerhöchsten Befehl Seiner Majestät des Kaisers und Königs, bearbeitet im Königlichen Kriegsministerium durch Gustav Lehmann, wirklichen geheimen Kriegsrat und vortragenden Rat im Kriegs-Ministerium, Erster Band: 1740–1811, Berlin 1913 (in German)
- Lehmann, Gustaf: Die Ritter des Ordens pour le mérite. Auf Allerhöchsten Befehl Seiner Majestät des Kaisers und Königs, bearbeitet im Königlichen Kriegsministerium durch Gustav Lehmann, wirklichen geheimen Kriegsrat und vortragenden Rat im Kriegs-Ministerium, Zweiter Band: 1812–1913, Berlin 1913, p. 123, Nr. 704 (in German)
- Naumann, Gottlob: Sammlung ungedruckter Nachrichten, so die Geschichte der Feldzüge der Preußen von 1740. bis 1779. erläutern, Band 1, Dresden 1782 (in German)
- Schöning, Kurd Wolfgang von: Der Siebenjährige Krieg : unter allerhöchster königlicher Bewilligung nach der Original-Correspondenz Friedrich des Großen mit dem Prinzen Heinrich und Seinen Generalen aus den Staats-Archiven bearbeitet, Band 2, 1851, Pages 260, 266, 273, 276, 291, 303, 307, 314, 316 and 320. (in German and French)
- Tollin, Henri Wilhelm Nathanael (1898). Deutscher Hugenotten-Verein (ed.). "Die Hugenotten-Kirche zu Frankfurt a. d. O." (application/pdf). Geschichtsblätter des Deutschen Hugenotten-Vereins. (in German). Vol. Zehnt VII, Heft 4-5, no. 1898. Magdeburg: Heinrichshofen.
