= Friedrich Heinrich Ferdinand Leopold von Forcade de Biaix =

Royal Prussian lieutenant colonel

Sir Friedrich Heinrich Ferdinand Leopold von Forcade de Biaix
- Friedrich Heinrich Ferdinand Leopold von Forcade de Biaix
- Born: Frederic Henri Ferdinand Leopold de Forcade; 19 December 1747; Berlin, Brandenburg
- Died: 12 October 1808; Gut Schleibtz, Oels, Silesia
- Title: Castellan (Drost) in Neuenrade
- Spouse(s): Johanna Christine Wilhelmine von Koschembahr und Skorkau, from the house of Ossen (1782)
- Children: 7, most notably: Friedrich Wilhelm Leopold Konstantin Quirin von Forcade de Biaix; Wilhelm Friedrich Erdmann Ferdinand von Forcade de Biaix; Friedrich Wilhelm Ferdinand Ernst Heinrich von Forcade de Biaix
- Parent(s): His Excellency, Lieutenant General Sir Friedrich Wilhelm Quirin von Forcade de Biaix and Marie de Montolieu, Baronne de St.-Hippolyte
- Military career
- Allegiance: Prussia
- Branch: Prussian Army
- Service years: 1761–1793
- Rank: Lieutenant Colonel
- Units: 23rd Prussian Infantry Regiment (1761–1767); Vernezobre Regiment (1767–1774); 28th Prussian Infantry Regiment
- Commands: 15th Fusilier Battalion; 10th Fusilier Battalion
- Conflicts: Seven Years' War; March to Silesia of 1790; Rhine Campaigns of 1791
- Awards: Knight of the Order of Pour le Mérite (1791)

Friedrich Heinrich Ferdinand Leopold von Forcade de Biaix, aka Heinrich Friedrich Ferdinand Leopold von Forcade de Biaix, aka Friedrich Heinrich Ferdinand Leopold Marquis de Forcade de Biaix (* 19 December 1747, Berlin; † 12 October 1808, Schleibitz Manor, Oels, Silesia), was a Royal Prussian lieutenant colonel. He served in the Prussian Army from 1761 to 1793. His last command was as commanding officer of the 10th Prussian Fusilier Battalion, with which he served in the Rhine Campaigns of 1791, where he was awarded the Kingdom of Prussia's highest military order of merit for heroism, Knight of the Order of Pour le Mérite (1791). He left the Prussian Army after 32 years of service in 1793 as the result of invalidity. At the time of his death, he was the owner of Schleibitz Manor, near Oels, Silesia.

He was the third son, of Royal Prussian Lieutenant General Friedrich Wilhelm Quirin von Forcade de Biaix, one of King Frederick the Great's most active and most treasured officers. His baptismal godfather was none less than His Majesty Frederick the Great. As a gift, the King ordered his father to accept the hereditary title of Drost zu Neuenrade ("Castellan of Neuenrade") in the County of Mark with the royal command that it be transferred to him upon his death. After his father's death in 1765, he became Castellan (Drost) of Neuenrade.

== Military career ==
He followed the military tradition of his family, and:

- entered Prussian military service in 1761 in his father's Regiment, the 23rd Prussian Infantry Regiment.
- participated at the Siege of Schweidnitz (4 August 1762 – 10 October 1762) during the Seven Years' War
- fought in the Battle of Freiberg (29 October 1762) during the Seven Years' War
- 1774, transferred to the 28th Prussian Infantry Regiment, aka The Zaremba Regiment, in Brieg, Silesia.
- 19 March 1788, as a major, appointed as Battalionschef of the 15th Füsilier Battalion in Löwenberg, Silesia.
- September 1791, awarded the Kingdom of Prussia's highest military order of merit for heroism, Knight of the Order of Pour le Mérite.
- 13 November 1791, appointed as battalion commander of the 10th Füsilier Battalion in Neumarkt, Silesia, with which he fought during the Rhine Campaigns.
- 1793, retired from active military service for reason of invalidity.
- 1798, promoted to the rank of lieutenant colonel by His Majesty, Frederick William III of Prussia.

== Family ==
=== Coat of arms ===
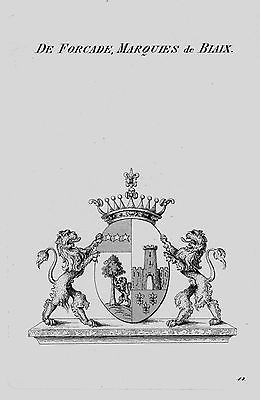
Forcade-Biaix coat of arms, Prussian branch, circa 1820

The family motto of the Prussian branch is "In Virtute Pertinax".

Coat of arms: An escutcheon with the field divided into four parts. Left half: argent tincture, a gules lion holding a sinople eradicated oak tree between its paws; azure tincture charged with three or mullets; Right half: a gules castle with three towers on an argent tincture; sinople tincture charged with three argent roses below it. A Grafenkrone (count's coronet) as helmut on top of the escutcheon, crested with a or fleur-de-lis. Two or lions supporting the escutcheon. Motto: "In Virtute Pertinax".

Heraldic symbolism: The lion symbolizes courage; the eradicated oak tree symbolizes strength and endurance; the towers are symbols of defense and of individual fortitude; the mullets (5-star) symbolizes divine quality bestowed by god; the rose is a symbol of hope and joy; the fleur-de-lis is the floral emblem of France; the coronet is a symbol of victory, sovereignty and empire. A count's coronet to demonstrate rank and because the family originally served the counts of Foix and Béarn during the English Wars in the Middle Ages.

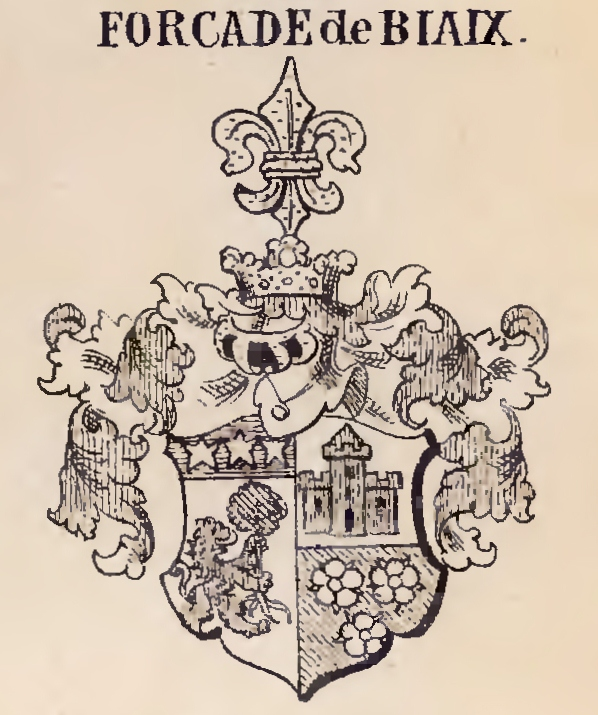
Forcade-Biaix coat of arms, Silesia branch, date unknown, pre-1900

=== Parents ===
His father was Friedrich Wilhelm Quirin von Forcade de Biaix (1699–1729), one of King Frederick the Great's most active and most treasured officers. Twice wounded and left for dead on the battlefield, he was Regimentschef of the 23rd Prussian Infantry Regiment, recipient of the Kingdom of Prussia's highest military order of merit for heroism, Knight of the Order of Pour le Mérite, Knight of the Order of the Black Eagle, Canon of Havelberg, Castellan of Neuenrade in the County of Mark, Lord Seneschal of Zinna, President of the Ober-Collegium Sanitatis in Berlin and Lieutenant governor of Breslau. He married in 1727 at the French Cathedral in Berlin with Marie de Montolieu, Baronne de St.-Hippolyte aka Maria von Montaulieu, Freiin von St.-Hippolyte (1709–1767), daughter of Sardinian and Prussian Major General Louis de Montolieu, Baron de St.-Hippolyte († 1738, Berlin), also a Huguenot exile.

=== Marriage ===
Friedrich Heinrich Ferdinand Leopold von Forcade de Biaix married on 15 April 1782 at Ossen Manor in Oels, Silesia, to Wilhelmine von Koshembahr und Skorkau from the house of Ossen, (* 13 January 1761, Ossen Manor, Oels; † 9 July 1816, Breslau), the daughter of Christian Leopold von Koschembahr und Skorkau, Herr of Ober- and Nieder-Ossen, Pühlau, Dörndorf and Jacobsdorf, and his second wife Charlotte Wilhelmine Wutge von Wutgenau.

=== Children ===
The couple had at least seven children from their marriage; known are five sons and two daughters. Three sons survived into adulthood.

- Friedrich Wilhelm Leopold Konstantin Quirin von Forcade de Biaix, Herr of Schleibitz, Hamm, Groß-Naedlitz and Loslau, (* 12 May 1784, Berlin; † 22 October 1840, Breslau Silesia), Royal Prussian Major, Knight of the Iron Cross 2nd Class, Knight of the Cross of the Royal Prussian Order of St. John Bailiwick of Brandenburg, Royal Prussian Chamberlain, and Castellan of Neuenrade in the County of Mark.
- Wilhelm Friedrich Erdmann Ferdinand von Forcade de Biaix (26 February 1786, Brieg, Silesia; † 1816), Imperial Russian Army lieutenant colonel, adjutant to Imperial Russian Army Infantry General Loggin Osipovitch Roth ("von Roth"), recipient of the Kingdom of Prussia's highest military order of merit, Knight of the Order of Pour le Mérite (26 May 1814).
- Friedrich Wilhelm Ferdinand Ernst Heinrich von Forcade de Biaix (* 7 October 1787, Brieg, Silesia; † 14 November 1835, in Rawicz, Posen), Royal Prussian major, commanding officer of the 10th Prussian Division's Garrison Company and Knight of the Iron Cross 2nd Class.
- Friedrike Wilhelmine Auguste Ulrike Karoline von Forcade de Biaix (* 12 July 1789, Löwenberg, Silesia; † 19 February 1797, Breslau, Silesia)
- Henriette Eugenie Emilie Antoinette Sophie von Forcade de Biaix (* 25 July 1791, Löwenberg, Silesia; † 12 September 1791, Löwenberg, Silesia)
- Friedrich Wilhelm Karl Ernst Heinrich von Forcade de Biaix (* 5 November 1793, Schleibitz Manor, Oels, Silesia; † 3 January 1796, Schleibitz Manor, Oels, Silesia)
- Friedrich Wilhelm Albrecht Quirin Ludwig von Forcade de Biaix (* 26 August 1797, Schleibitz Manor, Oels, Silesia; † 1 June 1805, Schleibitz Manor, Oels, Silesia)

=== Other family ===
- Brother: Friedrich Wilhelm von Forcade de Biaix (1728–1778), the eldest son, Royal Prussian colonel, Schwadronschef (Rittmeister) of the 2nd Grenadier Company in the 34th Prussian Infantry Regiment (1761), and, after 1 July 1761, acting Regimentschef of the 24th Prussian Infantry Regiment garrisoned in Frankfurt/Oder, recipient of the Kingdom of Prussia's highest military order of merit for heroism, Knight of the Order of Pour le Mérite (1791).
- Brother: Georg Friedrich Wilhelm von Forcade de Biaix (1746–1811), the second-born son, Royal Prussian Major in the 1st Hussar Regiment

== Titles and offices ==
Historical terms, in particular those related to offices, titles and awards, are often outdated in their usage to the point that modern dictionaries no longer contain them. To understand their meaning in the present day context it is necessary to look into dictionaries from the period. Historical terms in German used in the production of this article, and their English definitions, include:

=== Drost zu Neuenrade ===
Castellan of Neuenrade

- Drost (der): synonym with "Landdrost", "Landshauptmann" and "Landsvogt"; a Lord Seneschal, a governor of a certain part of a country, an Upper Bailiff, a Castellan See: Ebers, Johann, The New And Complete Dictionary Of The German And English Languages: composed chiefly after the German Dictionaries of Mr. Adelung and of Mr. Schwan / 1: ... Containing the Letters A – G of the German Alphabet explained in English, Leipzig 1796, Page 618 (in German and English)

== Literature ==
- Lehmann, Gustaf: Die Ritter des Ordens pour le mérite. Auf Allerhöchsten Befehl Seiner Majestät des Kaisers und Königs, bearbeitet im Königlichen Kriegsministerium durch Gustav Lehmann, wirklichen geheimen Kriegsrat und vortragenden Rat im Kriegs-Ministerium, Erster Band: 1740–1811, Berlin 1913 (in German)
- Lehmann, Gustaf: Die Ritter des Ordens pour le mérite. Auf Allerhöchsten Befehl Seiner Majestät des Kaisers und Königs, bearbeitet im Königlichen Kriegsministerium durch Gustav Lehmann, wirklichen geheimen Kriegsrat und vortragenden Rat im Kriegs-Ministerium, Zweiter Band: 1812–1913, Berlin 1913, (in German)
