= Friedrich Wilhelm Ferdinand Ernst Heinrich von Forcade de Biaix =

- Born: 7 October 1787; Brieg, Silesia, Prussia
- Died: 14 November 1835 (aged 48); Rawitsch, Posen, Prussia
- Burial place: Rawitsch, Posen, Prussia
- Spouse: Josephine Caroline von Neumann (1827)
- Parent(s): Friedrich Heinrich Ferdinand Leopold von Forcade de Biaix; Johanna Christine Wilhelmine von Koschembahr und Skorkau from the house of Ossen
- Military career
- Allegiance: Prussia
- Branch: Prussian Army
- Service years: 1802-1835
- Rank: Major
- Units: 32nd Prussian Infantry Regiment (1802-1807); 18th Prussian Infantry Regiment (1807-1835)
- Commands: 10th Division's Garrison Company, 18th Prussian Infantry Regiment (1833)
- Conflicts: War of the Fourth Coalition; War of the Sixth Coalition
- Awards: Knight of the Iron Cross 2nd Class (1814), Distinguished Service Cross, Kriegsdenkmünze für 1813/15

Friedrich Wilhelm Ferdinand Ernst Heinrich von Forcade de Biaix, aka Ferdinand von Forcade (7 October 1787 – 14 November 1835), Royal Prussian Major and Knight of the Iron Cross 2nd Class.

He was a grandson of Royal Prussian Lieutenant General Friedrich Wilhelm Quirin von Forcade de Biaix, one of King Frederick the Great's most active and most treasured officers, a Huguenot descendant of the noble family of Forcade and one of a third generation of decorated Prussian Army officers in the Forcade de Biaix dynasty. His last command was as commanding officer of the 10th Prussian Division's Garrison Company. He served the Prussian Army with 32¾ years of service.

== Military career ==
He followed the military tradition of his family, and:

- 1802, entered Prussian military service in the 32nd Prussian Infantry Regiment.
- 14 October 1806, was taken prisoner at the Battle of Jena during the War of the Fourth Coalition, where Napoleon I of France defeated the Prussian Army.
- After the Treaty of Tilsit on 9 July 1807, he was released and reintegrated into the Prussian Army, this time with the 18th Prussian Infantry Regiment.
- 1813–1815, participated in the German Campaigns during the War of the Sixth Coalition with the 18th Prussian Infantry Regiment, during which he was awarded the Knight of the Iron Cross 2nd Class for his actions at the Battle of Laon.
- 1833, promoted to major and commanding officer of the 10th Prussian Division's Garrison Company.

== Family ==
=== Coat of arms ===
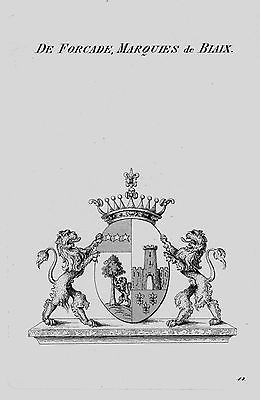
Forcade-Biaix coat of arms, Prussian branch, circa 1820

The family motto of the Prussian branch is "In Virtute Pertinax".

Coat of arms: An escutcheon with the field divided into four parts. Left half: argent tincture, a gules lion holding a sinople eradicated oak tree between its paws; azure tincture charged with three or mullets; Right half: a gules castle with three towers on an argent tincture; sinople tincture charged with three argent roses below it. A Grafenkrone (count's coronet) as helmut on top of the escutcheon, crested with a or fleur-de-lis. Two or lions supporting the escutcheon. Motto: "In Virtute Pertinax".

Heraldic symbolism: The lion symbolizes courage; the eradicated oak tree symbolizes strength and endurance; the towers are symbols of defense and of individual fortitude; the mullets (5-star) symbolizes divine quality bestowed by god; the rose is a symbol of hope and joy; the fleur-de-lis is the floral emblem of France; the coronet is a symbol of victory, sovereignty and empire. A count's coronet to demonstrate rank and because the family originally served the counts of Foix and Béarn during the English Wars in the Middle Ages.

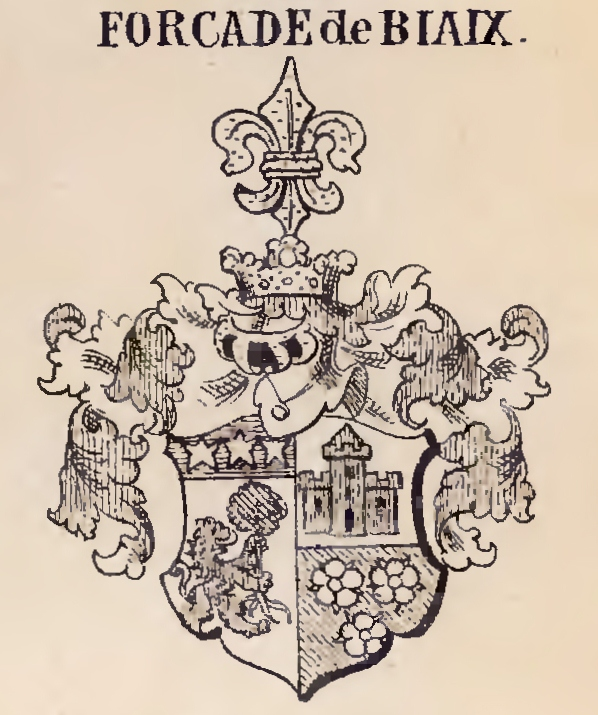
Forcade-Biaix coat of arms, Silesia branch, date unknown, pre-1900

=== Parents ===
His father was Friedrich Heinrich Ferdinand Leopold von Forcade de Biaix (1747–1808), a Royal Prussian lieutenant colonel, recipient of Kingdom of Prussia's highest military order of merit for heroism, Knight of the Order of Pour le Mérite and Castellan (Drost) of Neuenrade in the County of Mark. He married in 1782 at Ossen Manor in Oels, Silesia, to Wilhelmine von Koshembahr und Skorkau (1762–?), from the house of Ossen. She was the daughter of Christian Leopold von Koschembahr und Skorkau, Herr of Ober- and Nieder-Ossen, Pühlau, Dörndorf and Jacobsdorf, and his 2nd wife Charlotte Wilhelmine von Wutgenau.

=== Marriage ===
Ferdinand von Forcade de Biaix married on 15 February 1827 in Fraustadt, Posen, with Josephine Caroline von Neumann (1795–1882), from Warsaw, the daughter of Johann August von Neumann and Franziska von Pawlowicz. Their marriage was childless. Although she was only 40 years old at the time of his death, she never remarried.

=== Other family ===
- Brother: Friedrich Wilhelm Leopold Konstantin Quirin von Forcade de Biaix (1784–1840), Herr of Schleibitz, Hamm, Groß-Naedlitz and Loslau, Royal Prussian major, Knight of the Iron Cross 2nd Class for his heroic actions defending the so-called Red House at Strehlen near Dresden against a vastly superior enemy during the Battle of Dresden on 26 August 1813, Knight of the Order of St. John Bailiwick of Brandenburg in 1817, Royal Prussian Chamberlain, and Castellan of Neuenrade in the County of Mark.
- Brother: Wilhelm Friedrich Erdmann Ferdinand von Forcade de Biaix (1786-1816), Imperial Russian Army lieutenant, adjutant to Imperial Russian Army Infantry General Loggin Ossipovitch Rot ("von Roth"), recipient of the Kingdom of Prussia's highest military order of merit, Knight of the Order of Pour le Mérite (26.5.1814). He was reported as Missing in Action in 1816.

== Literature ==
- Archiv der Stiftung Zentralstelle für Personen- und Familiengeschichte, Berlin-Dahlem
- Danty, Pierre: Revue de Pau et du Béarn, Une famille béarnaise au service de la Prusse : les Forcade-Biaix, La Société des Sciences Lettres et Arts de Pau et du Béarn, 1978, Nr. 6, Pages 269–272. (in French)
- Ebers, Johann, The New And Complete Dictionary Of The German And English Languages: composed chiefly after the German Dictionaries of Mr. Adelung and of Mr. Schwan / 1: ... Containing the Letters A - G of the German Alphabet explained in English, Leipzig 1796 (in German and English)
- Ebers, Johann, The New And Complete Dictionary Of The German And English Languages: composed chiefly after the German Dictionaries of Mr. Adelung and of Mr. Schwan / 2: ... Containing the Letters H - R of the German Alphabet explained in English, Leipzig 1796 (in German and English)
- Ebers, Johann, The New And Complete Dictionary Of The German And English Languages: composed chiefly after the German Dictionaries of Mr. Adelung and of Mr. Schwan / 3: ... Containing the Letters S - Z of the German Alphabet explained in English, Leipzig 1796 (in German and English)
- Gieraths, Günther: Die Kampfhandlungen der brandenburgisch-preussischen Armee, 1626-1807, Band 8, Berlin 1964, Pages 79 & 111. (in German)
- Kneschke, Ernst Heinrich: Neues allgemeines Deutsches Adels-Lexicon, Band 3, Leipzig 1861, Pages 293–294. (in German)
- König, Anton Balthasar: Biographisches Lexikon aller Helden und Militairpersonen, welche sich in Preußischen Diensten berühmt gemacht haben: A - F, Band 1, Pages 429–432. (in German)
- Komander, Gerhild H. M.: Der Wandel des "Sehepuncktes". Die Geschichte Brandenburg-Preußens in der Graphik von 1648 bis 1810. Münster 1995, Pages 310–311. (in German)
- Kroener, Bernhard: Potsdam: Staat, Armee, Residenz in der preußisch-deutschen Militärgeschichte. (in German)
- Ledebur, Leopold von: Allgemeines Archiv für die Geschichtskunde des Preußischen Staates, Band 17, Berlin 1835, Page 43. (in German)
- Priesdorff, Kurt von: Soldatisches Führertum, Band 1, Hamburg 1937, Pages 354–356, Nr. 371. (in German)
- Schöning, Kurd Wolfgang von: Die Generale der chur-brandenburgischen und königlich preussischen Armee von 1640-1840. (Chronologische Uebersicht der Brandenb. Preuss. Generalität seit 1640.) Eine historische Uebersicht, sammt vielen eingewebten urkundlichen Notizen als Jubelschrift dem vaterländischen Kriegesheere geweiht, Page 71, Nr. 364. (in German)
