= Double rose =

The Tudor rose is a double rose.

Double rose is a term used for a rose in heraldry when it has not only five petals, but additionally five petals within the outer petals. It is in essence a combination of two roses, one on top of the other. A standard heraldic rose should not be depicted this way but has only the five outer petals.

An example of this heraldic charge is the Tudor rose, which is (most usually) a double rose gules and argent, barbed and seeded proper, but as it is so common in English heraldry it is often just blazoned as a "Tudor rose" or a "Tudor rose proper", for instance in the coat of arms of the Royal Borough of Greenwich, London.

In botany, a double rose is a double-flowered variety of the rose, much like the heraldic double rose. These varieties go back to pre-heraldic times.
