= Viereck =

- Municipality
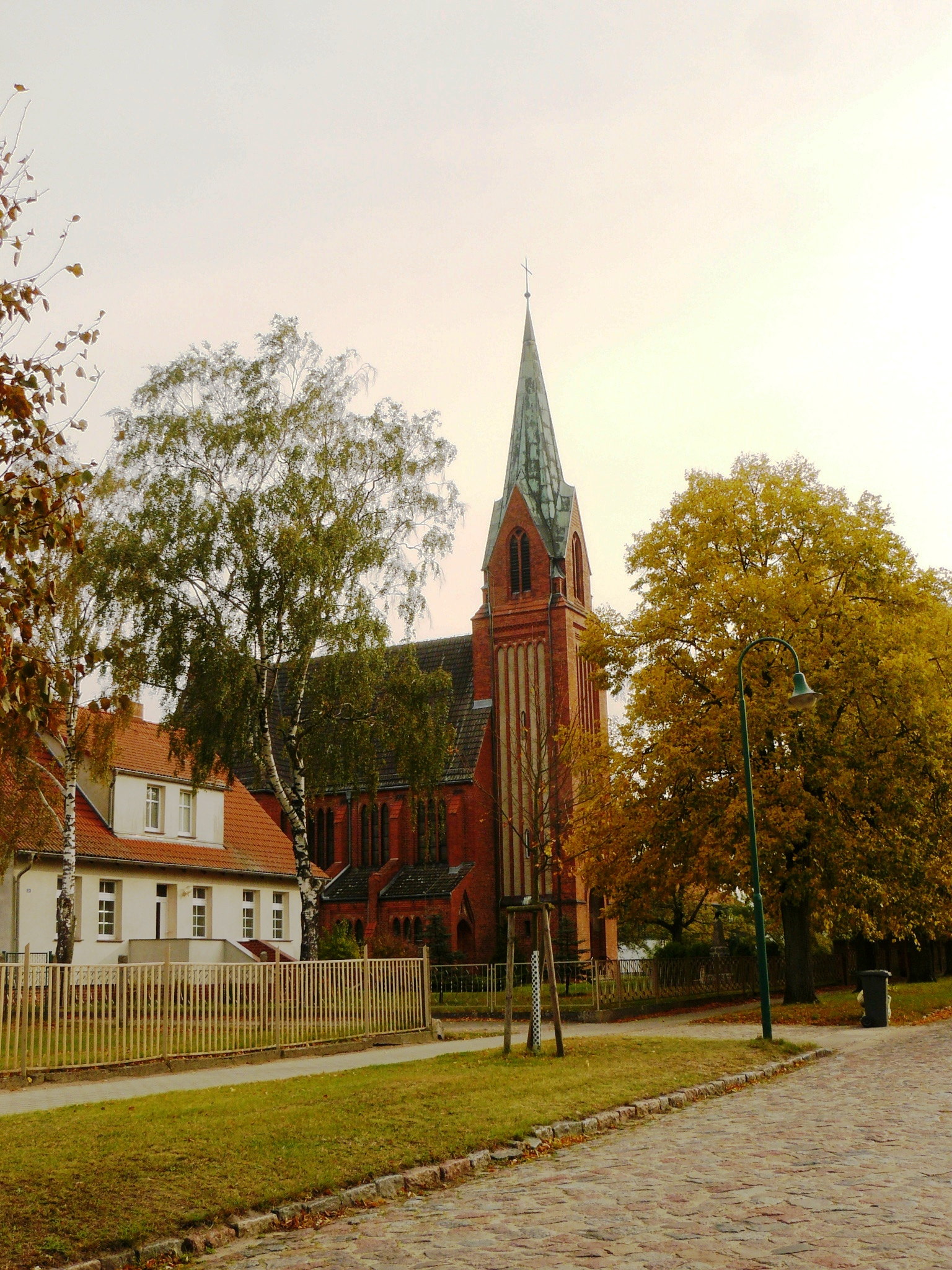
- Church of the Nativity of the Virgin Mary

- Location of Viereck within Vorpommern-Greifswald district
- Interactive map of Viereck
- Location within Germany Location within Mecklenburg-Vorpommern
- Coordinates: 53°33′N 14°02′E
- Country: Germany
- State: Mecklenburg-Vorpommern
- District: Vorpommern-Greifswald
- Municipal assoc.: Uecker-Randow-Tal

Government
  - Mayor: Axel Marquardt (Left)

Area
  - Total: 54.75 km^{2} (21.14 sq mi)
- Elevation: 15 m (49 ft)

Population (2025-12-31)
  - Total: 889
  - Density: 16.2/km^{2} (42.1/sq mi)
- Time zone: UTC+01:00 (CET)
  - Summer (DST): UTC+02:00 (CEST)
- Postal codes: 17309
- Dialling codes: 039744, 039748
- Vehicle registration: VG
- Website: www.amt-uecker-randow-tal.de

Viereck is a municipality in the Vorpommern-Greifswald district, in Mecklenburg-Vorpommern, Germany.

== History ==
Viereck was founded in 1748 in the Prussian Province of Pomerania in the course of the repopulation policy under King Frederick II, the Great, of Prussia. The area had been part of Swedish Pomerania from 1648 until 1720, when it was transferred to Prussia as a result of the Treaty of Stockholm. The then competent Prussian state minister in charge of internal colonisation, Adam Otto von Viereck, became namesake to the place, when it was renamed in his honour in 1751. Viereck remained a part of the Province of Pomerania until 1945. From 1945 to 1952, it was part of the State of Mecklenburg-Vorpommern, from 1952 to 1990 of the Bezirk Neubrandenburg of East Germany and since 1990 again of Mecklenburg-Vorpommern.
