= Adam Otto von Viereck =

Prussian state minister and Privy Councillor

Adam Otto von Viereck (born March 10, 1684, in Wattmannshagen; (Note: today a district of Lalendorf) died July 11, 1758, in Buch) was a Prussian state minister and Privy Councillor.

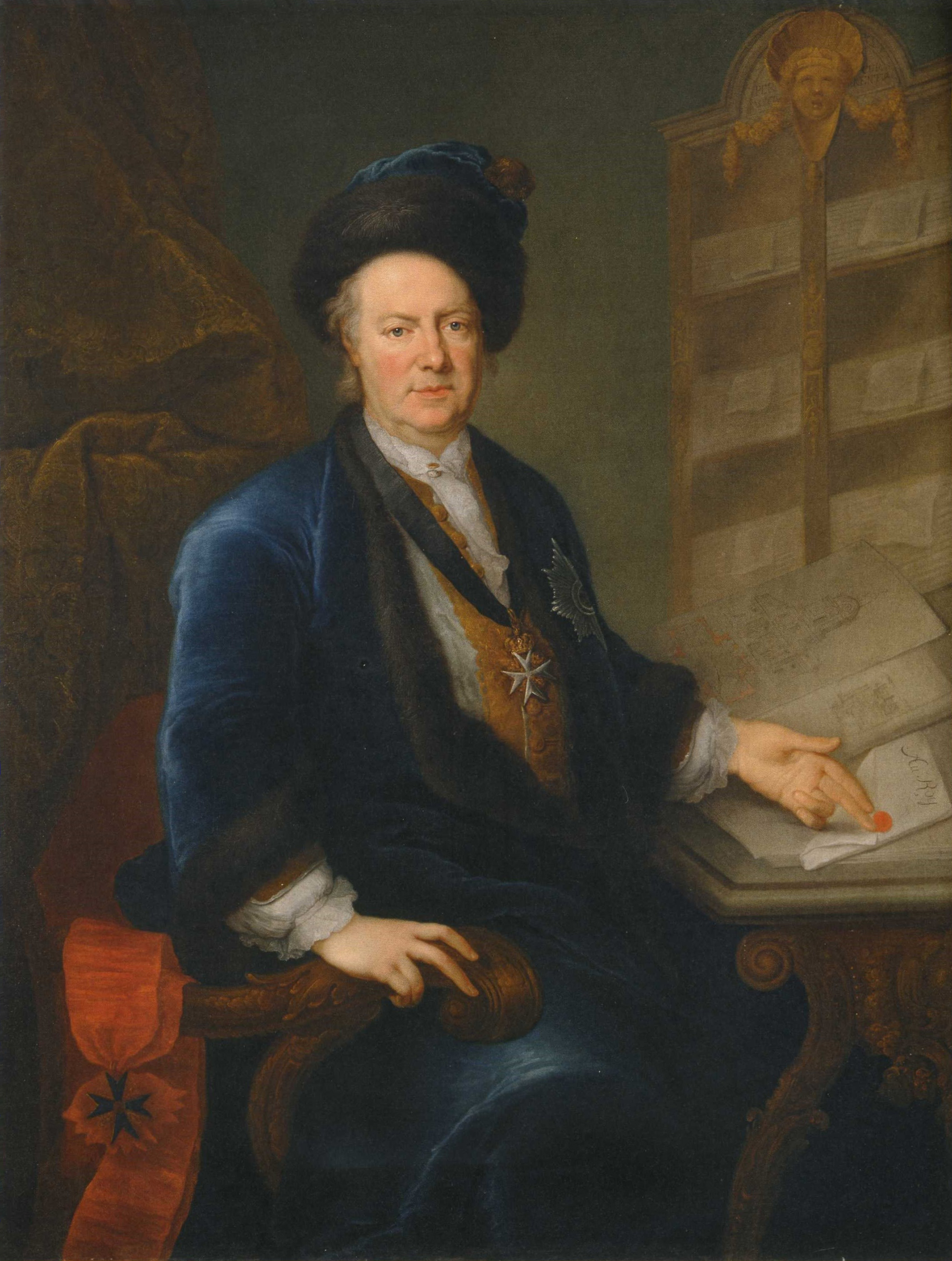
Adam Otto von Viereck, Painting by David Matthieu, 1745

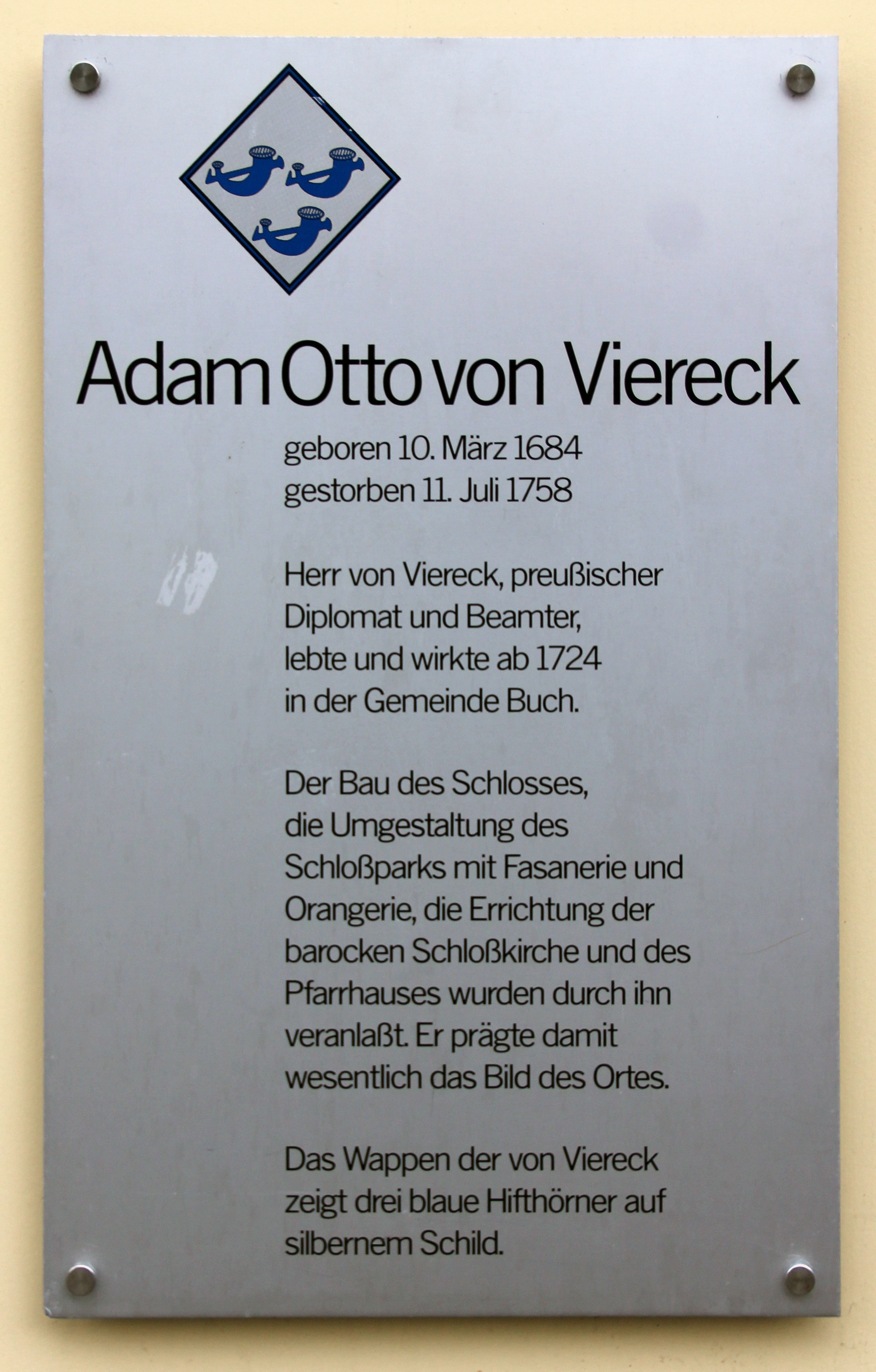
Commemorative plaque at Wiltbergstraße 25, in Berlin-Buch

== Biography ==
Adam Otto von Viereck (the family name was originally also written as Vieregg[e]) was a son of the jurist of the same name and president of the chamber of Mecklenburg-Güstrow, Adam Otto von Viereck (1634–1717), and his second wife Anna Helena, née von Wolffersdorff (1651–1701).

Viereck initially studied with his brothers under the Jesuits in Wilda and then attended the universities in Frankfurt and Halle. After completing his studies, he served in the Guard under Anton Ulrich of Brunswick. During the War of the Spanish Succession, he became adjutant to Hesse-Kassel in 1705. In 1707, he accompanied Princess Katharina Elisabeth on her journey to her fiancé, the future Emperor Charles VI, in Vienna. That same year, he was also appointed chamberlain by Frederick William I. In 1711, he served as marshal of the Prussian delegation to the imperial election in Frankfurt am Main, where he was among those knighted as Imperial Knights. In 1713, he again acted as marshal of the Prussian delegation during the negotiations for the Peace of Utrecht. In 1716, he was appointed envoy to Paris and in 1719 was sent to Kleve as a privy councillor. From there, he went to France for two years as ambassador.

In 1724, he was appointed Real Privy War and Domain Councillor of the Electorate of the Mark and was responsible in the administration for organizing agriculture and the taxes to be paid from it. He was also in charge of settling immigrants in rural areas.

In January 1727, he was appointed Real Privy State, War, and Managing Minister at the General Directory. In 1733, he became Commander of the Commandery of Lagow, and on January 27, 1736, Senior of the Bailiwick of Brandenburg of the Order of Saint John. On September 11, 1745, he was awarded the Order of the Black Eagle by Frederick II. In 1747, he became an honorary member of the Royal Prussian Academy of Sciences.

Adam was the hereditary lord of Weitendorf, and in 1724 he acquired the estate in Buch near Berlin (in today's Berlin district of Pankow). Viereck rendered outstanding service to the community through four measures:

- 1725: Creation of a land register
- Reconstruction of Buch Palace and its park grounds
- 1731–1736: Construction of the church
- 1740: Construction of the parsonage

He had the palace garden redesigned in the style of Versailles, adding an orangery and a pheasantry. The buildings and the park continue to shape the character of the area to this day. Otto von Viereck's richly adorned grave, featuring the family coat of arms, is located in the Buch Palace Church; his marble bust was created by Johann Georg Glume, father of Friedrich Christian Glume, in 1763 as his final work.

In 1747, von Viereck took ownership of the entire village of Birkholz after the magistrate of Cöln transferred its shares to him.

In 1752, he is recorded as a canon of Halberstadt and provost of Liebfrauen.

The Viereck and Voß families, who successively owned Buch from 1761 onward, were related by marriage. A child from both families was Julie von Voß.

In 1761, Otto von Viereck bequeathed Birkholz to his son-in-law, the Privy Councillor and cathedral provost Friedrich Christian Hieronymus von Voß.

In 1751, the newly established settler colony of Jägersberg, founded in 1748, was renamed Viereck in his honor. On May 11, 1938, a street in Pankow, Buch district—Viereckweg, running from Pölnitzweg to Hörstenweg and Röbellweg—was named after Adam Otto von Viereck.

The estate of Weitendorf was later inherited by his nephew and son-in-law, the future Major General Christian Friedrich von Viereck.

== Family ==
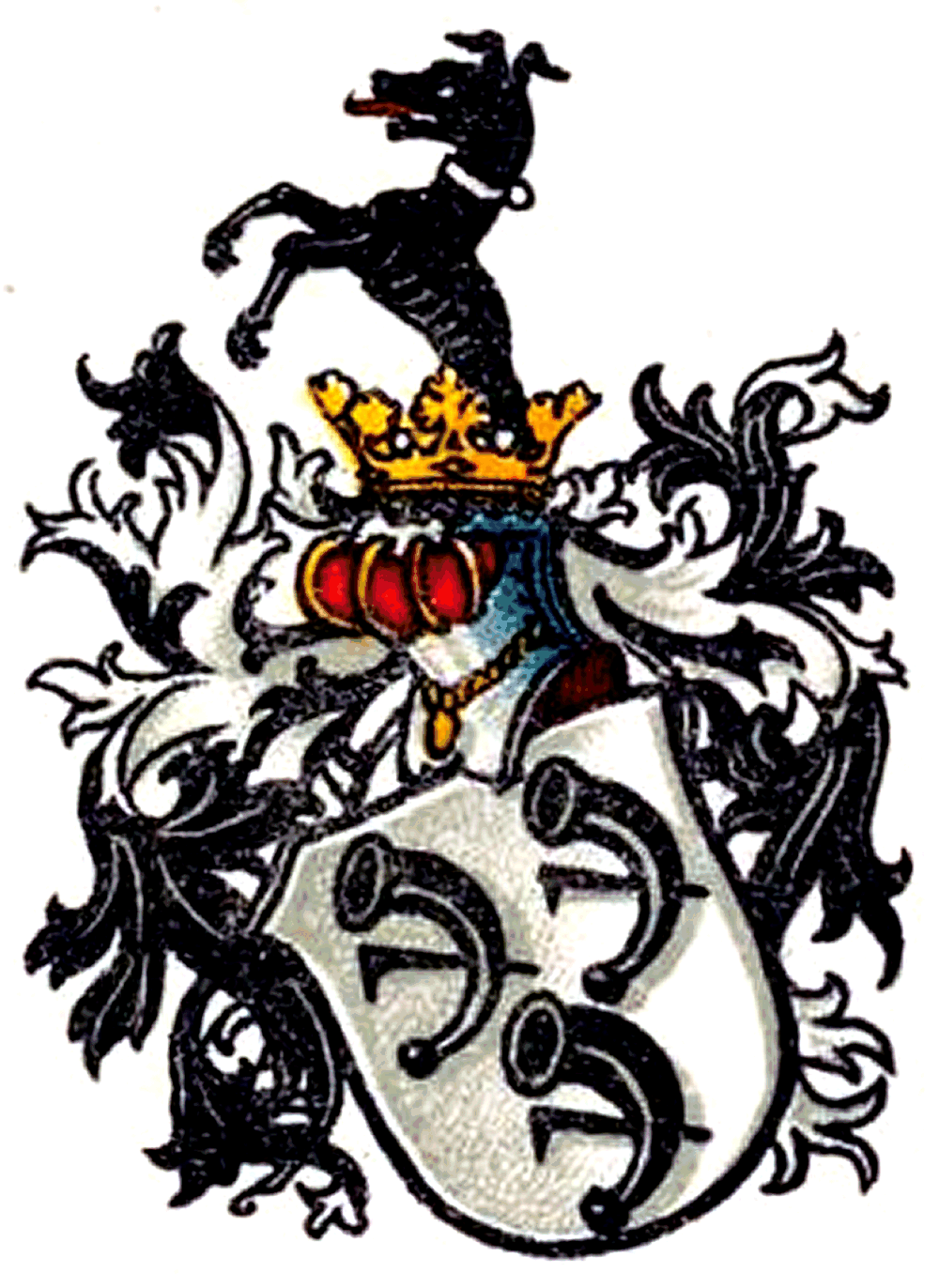
Vieregg coat of arms

In 1718, he married Katharina Louise von Gersdorf (1700–1728), the daughter of Lieutenant General von Gersdorf.

Children from this marriage:

- Sophie Wilhelmine (d. 1742), married Adam Friedrich von Jeetze (1689–1762), a Prussian general
- Charlotte Sophie (1722–1770), married August Friedrich von Itzenplitz (1693–1759), a Prussian general
- Wilhelmine Dorothea (1726–1799), married Otto Friedrich Leopold Finck von Finckenstein (1717–1790) on November 14, 1743

His second wife was Countess Maria Anna Finck von Finckenstein (1704–1758), daughter of Field Marshal Albrecht Konrad Finck von Finckenstein.

Children from this marriage:

- Sophie Wilhelmine Albertine (1731–1772), married Friedrich Wilhelm von Pannewitz (1719–1790)
- Amalia Ottilie (1736–1767), married Friedrich Christian Hieronymus von Voß (1724–1784) on February 15, 1754; they were the parents of Julie von Voß
- Ulrike Charlotte Auguste Luise (1742–1797), married Christian Friedrich von Viereck (1725–1777), a Prussian major general and heir of Weitendorf
