= Klieken =

- Stadtteil of Coswig
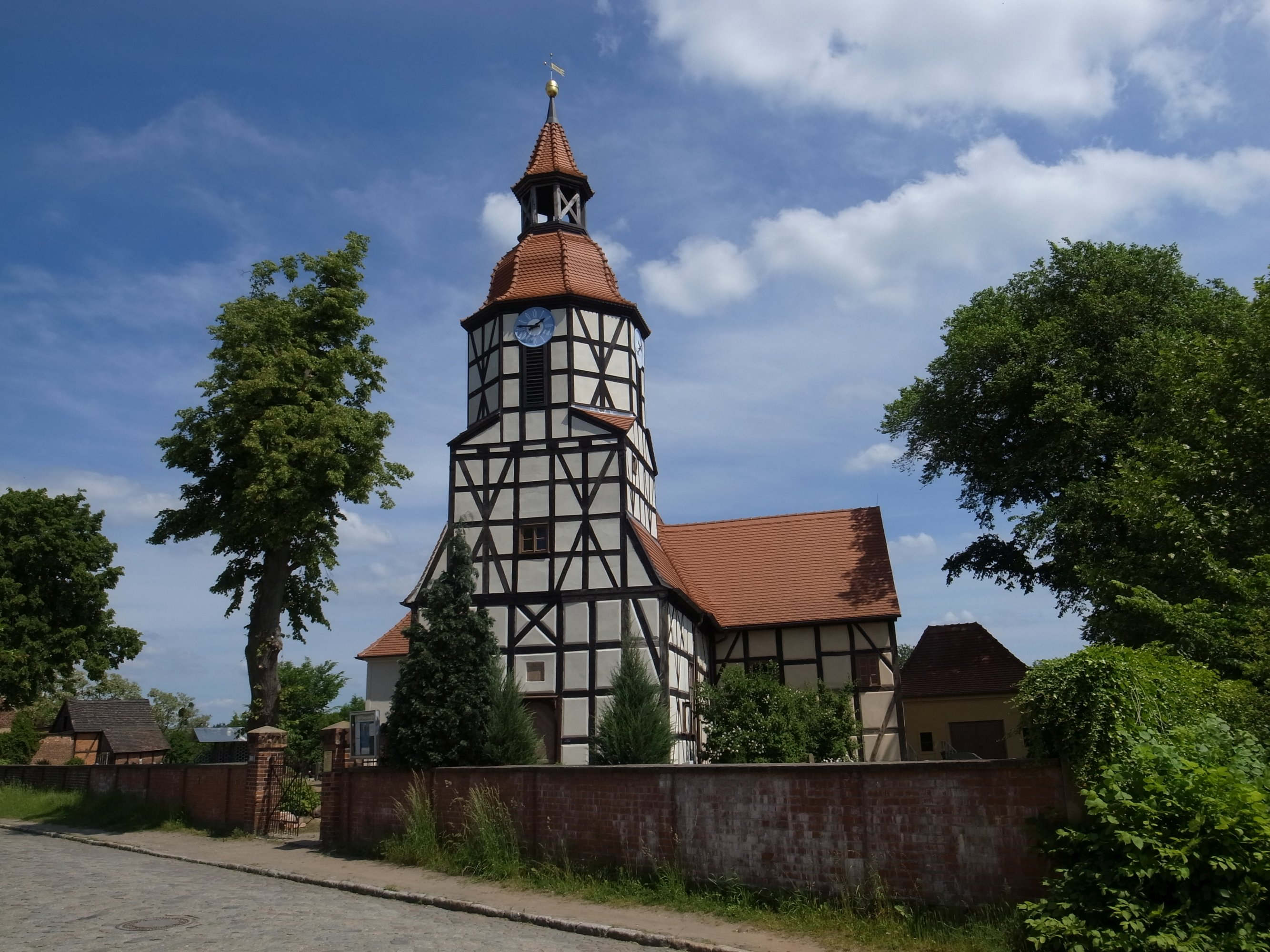
- Church

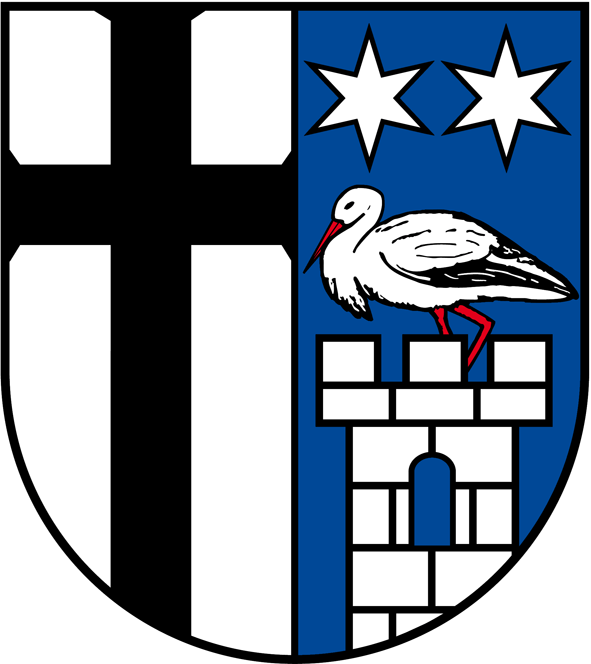
- Coat of arms
- Interactive map of Klieken
- Location within Germany Location within Saxony-Anhalt
- Coordinates: 51°52′N 12°22′E
- Country: Germany
- State: Saxony-Anhalt
- District: Wittenberg
- Town: Coswig

Area
  - Total: 32.47 km^{2} (12.54 sq mi)
- Elevation: 65 m (213 ft)

Population (2006-12-31)
  - Total: 1,113
  - Density: 34.28/km^{2} (88.78/sq mi)
- Time zone: UTC+01:00 (CET)
  - Summer (DST): UTC+02:00 (CEST)
- Postal codes: 06869
- Dialling codes: 034903
- Vehicle registration: WB

Klieken is a village and a former municipality in the district of Wittenberg, Saxony-Anhalt, in eastern Germany. Since 1 March 2009, it is part of the town Coswig.

Under Nazi Germany, it was the location of a forced labour subcamp of the prison in Coswig.
