= Zinna =

- Ortsteil of Torgau
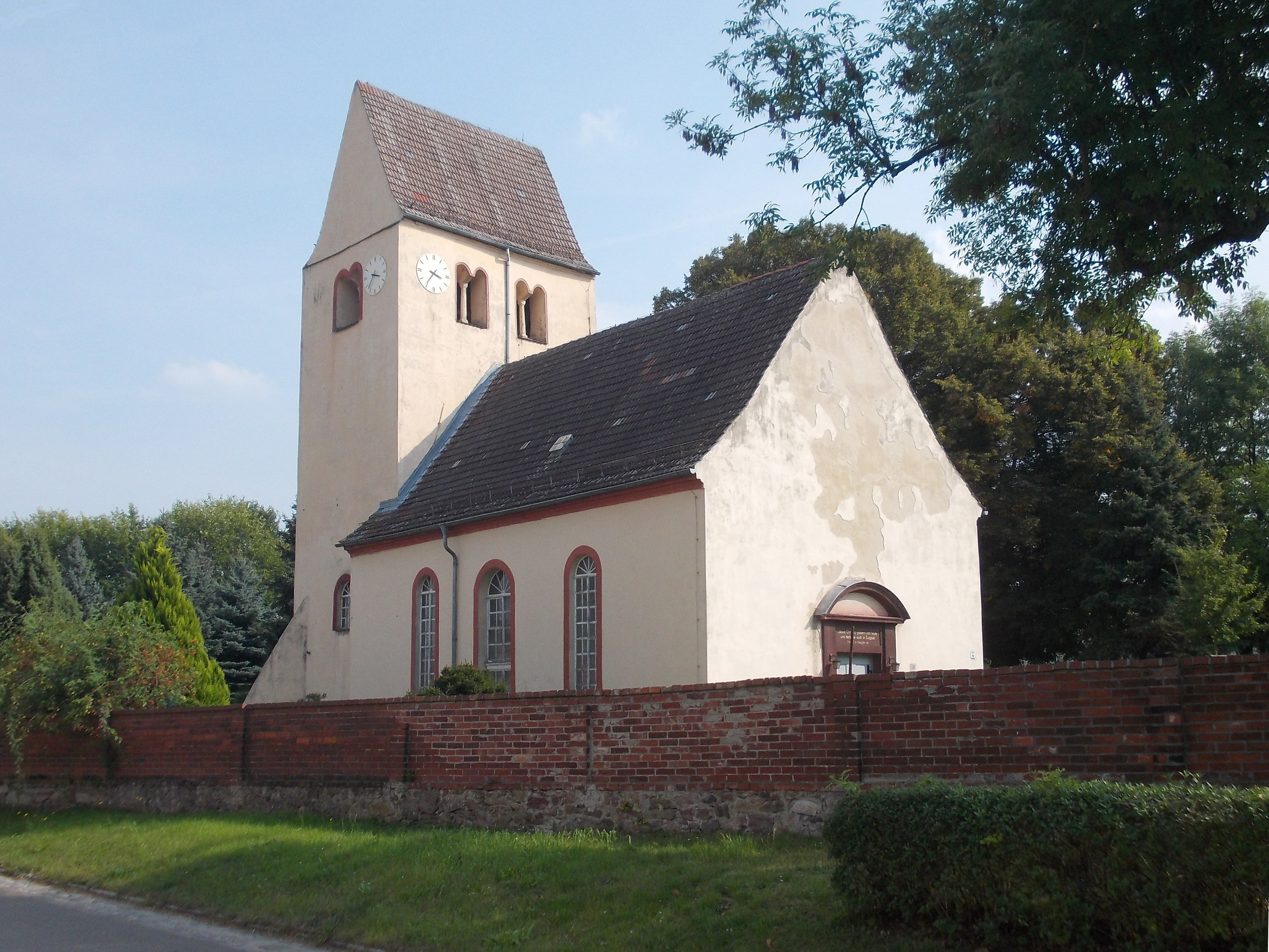
- Zinna Church in September 2014

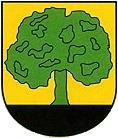
- Coat of arms
- Interactive map of Zinna
- Location within Germany Location within Saxony
- Coordinates: 51°34′N 12°57′E
- Country: Germany
- State: Saxony
- District: Nordsachsen
- Town: Torgau

Area
  - Total: 12.20 km^{2} (4.71 sq mi)
- Elevation: 89 m (292 ft)

Population (2011-12-31)
  - Total: 1,475
  - Density: 120.9/km^{2} (313.1/sq mi)
- Time zone: UTC+01:00 (CET)
  - Summer (DST): UTC+02:00 (CEST)
- Postal codes: 04860
- Dialling codes: 03421
- Vehicle registration: TDO
- Website: www.zinna.de

Zinna (German pronunciation: [ˈtsɪna]) is a village and a former municipality in the district Nordsachsen, in Saxony, Germany. Since 1 January 2013, it is part of the town Torgau.

== See also ==
- Treaty of Zinna
- Zinna Abbey
