= French Cathedral, Berlin =

Church in Berlin, Germany

French (Reformed) Church of Friedrichstadt
- Französisch-reformierte Friedrichstadtkirche
- View from west onto the church proper, surmounted by the adjacent domed tower

Religion
- Affiliation: United Protestant since its reconstruction in 1981; originally Reformed (i.e. Calvinist) and intended for the Huguenot community
- District: Calvinist congregation: Reformed deanery of Berlin-Brandenburg united congregation: Sprengel Berlin (region), Kirchenkreis Stadtmitte (deanery)
- Province: Evangelical Church of Berlin-Brandenburg-Silesian Upper Lusatia

Location
- Location: Friedrichstadt, a locality of Berlin
- Interactive map of French (Reformed) Church of Friedrichstadt
- Coordinates: 52°30′52″N 13°23′32″E

Architecture
- Architects: Louis Cayart and Abraham Quesnay (1701–05), Carl von Gontard (design), Georg Christian Unger (tower construction in 1780–05), Otto March (interior reshape 1905), Manfred Prasser, Roland Steiger and Uwe Karl (reconstruction 1977–81)
- Completed: 1 March 1705, reconstruction 1981

The French (Reformed) Church of Friedrichstadt (French: Temple de la Friedrichstadt, German: Französische Friedrichstadtkirche, and commonly known as Französischer Dom, meaning 'French cathedral') is in Berlin at the Gendarmenmarkt, across from the Konzerthaus and the so-called German Cathedral. The earliest parts of the church date back to 1701, although it was subsequently expanded. After being heavily damaged during World War II, the church was rebuilt and continues to offer church services and concerts.

== Name ==
The church is officially known as the "French Church of Friedrichstadt", but is commonly referred to as Französischer Dom, or "French Cathedral". Despite their names, neither of the churches on Gendarmenmarkt is a cathedral, as neither was ever seat of a bishop; instead, the name element Dom ("cathedral" in German) refers to the French word "dôme" (dome/cupola), using terminology as a relic of francophone Frederick the Great, who was instrumental in enhancing Gendarmenmarkt.

== History ==
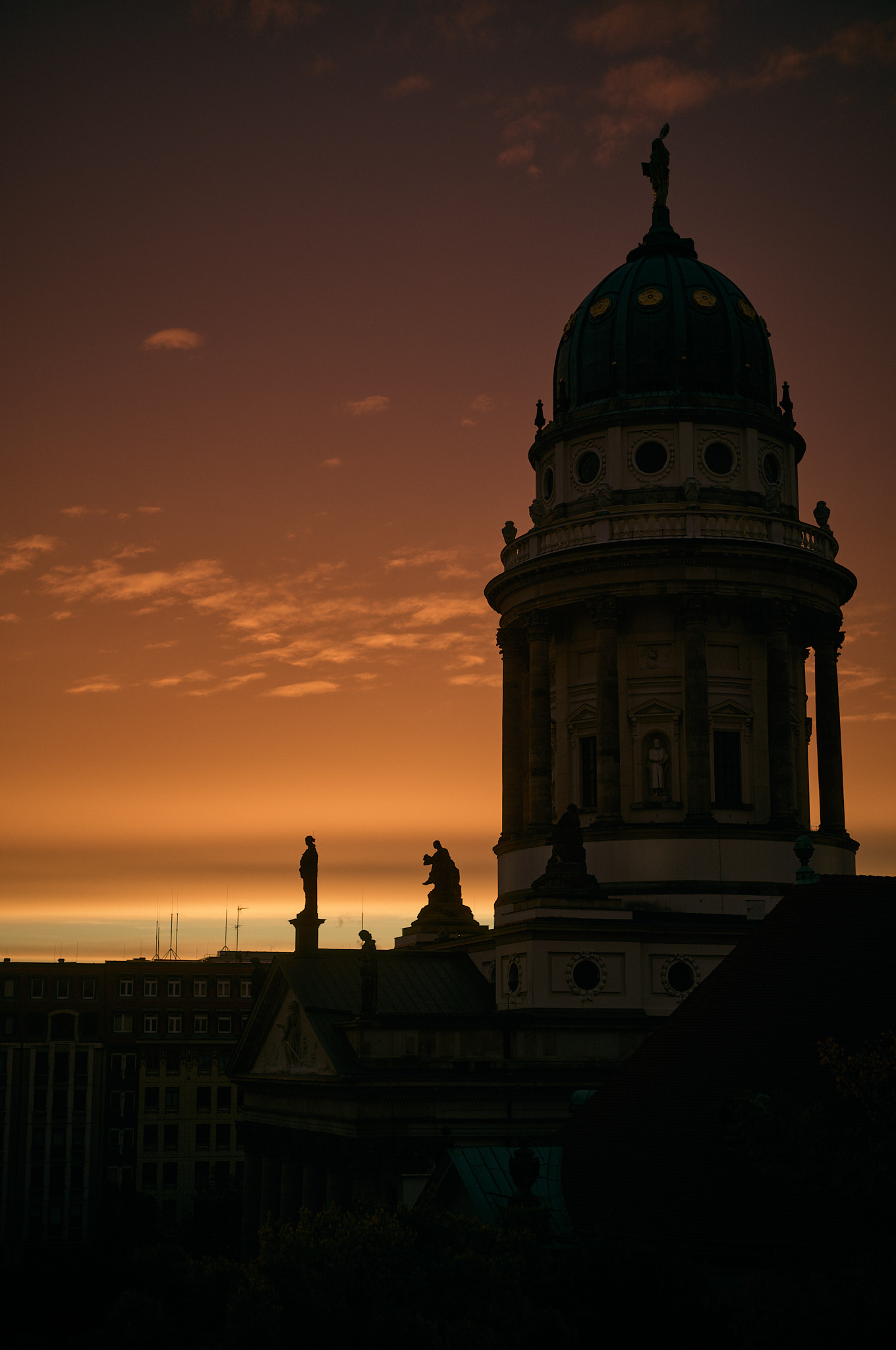
Französischer Dom At Dawn

Louis Cayart and Abraham Quesnay built the first parts of the French Church between 1701 and 1705 for the Huguenot (ethnic French Calvinist) community. During this time, Huguenots constituted about 25 percent of the city population. The French Church was modelled after the destroyed Huguenot temple in Charenton-Saint-Maurice, France.

In 1785, Carl von Gontard modified the church and built an adjacent domed tower, which eventually gave the church its name. Technically speaking, the tower is not part of the church, and both buildings have different proprietors. The tower was built to embellish the Gendarmenmarkt ensemble at the instigation of Frederick the Great. The Deutscher Dom, however, on the other side of Gendarmenmarkt, consists of church building and tower as an entity.

In 1817, the French Church community, like most Prussian Calvinist Reformed and Lutheran congregations joined the common umbrella organization "Evangelical Church in Prussia", with each congregation maintaining its former denomination or adopting the new united denomination. The community of the "French Church of Friedrichstadt" maintained its Calvinist denomination.

Nevertheless, already before the union of the Prussian Protestants the congregation underwent a certain acculturation with Lutheran traditions: in 1753, an organ was installed, competing with the Calvinist tradition of congregational singing without accompaniment. The singing of psalms was extended by hymns in 1791. The sober interior was refurbished in a more decorative but still Calvinist aniconistic style by Otto March in 1905. Today's community is part of the Evangelical Church of Berlin-Brandenburg-Silesian Upper Lusatia.

The Französischer Dom was severely damaged during World War II and rebuilt between 1977 and 1981. Today, it is used by its congregations, and for conventions of the Evangelical Church in Germany.

The public observation deck of the domed tower offers a panoramic view of the downtown area. There is a restaurant in the basement underneath the sanctuary. The tower also contains the Berlin Huguenot museum.

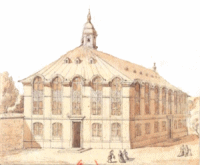
The Protestant Temple in Charenton before its demolition

War-destroyed Französischer Dom tower and damaged actual prayer hall with the destroyed Schauspielhaus (left), photo of 4 October 1951

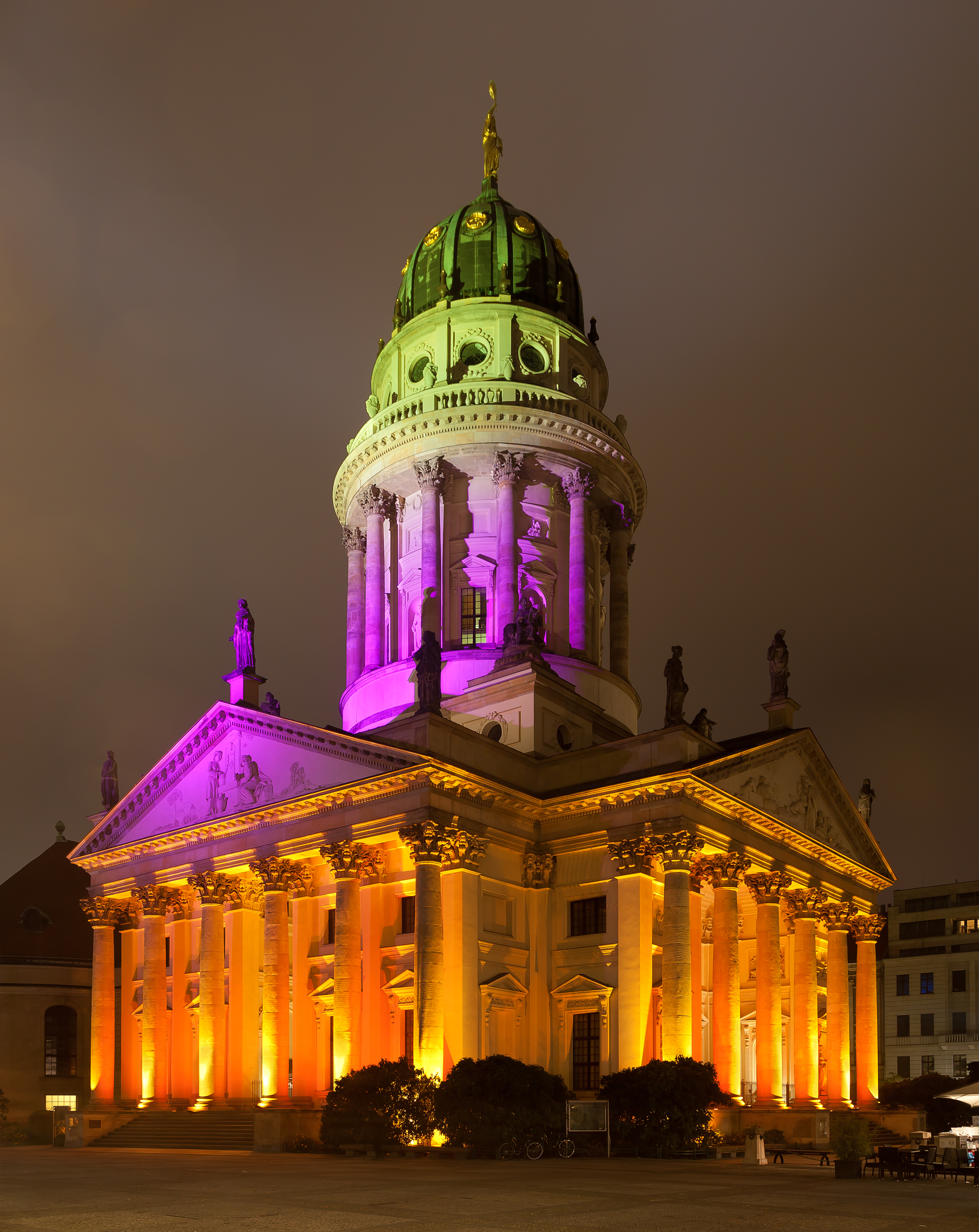
Cathedral during Festival of Lights

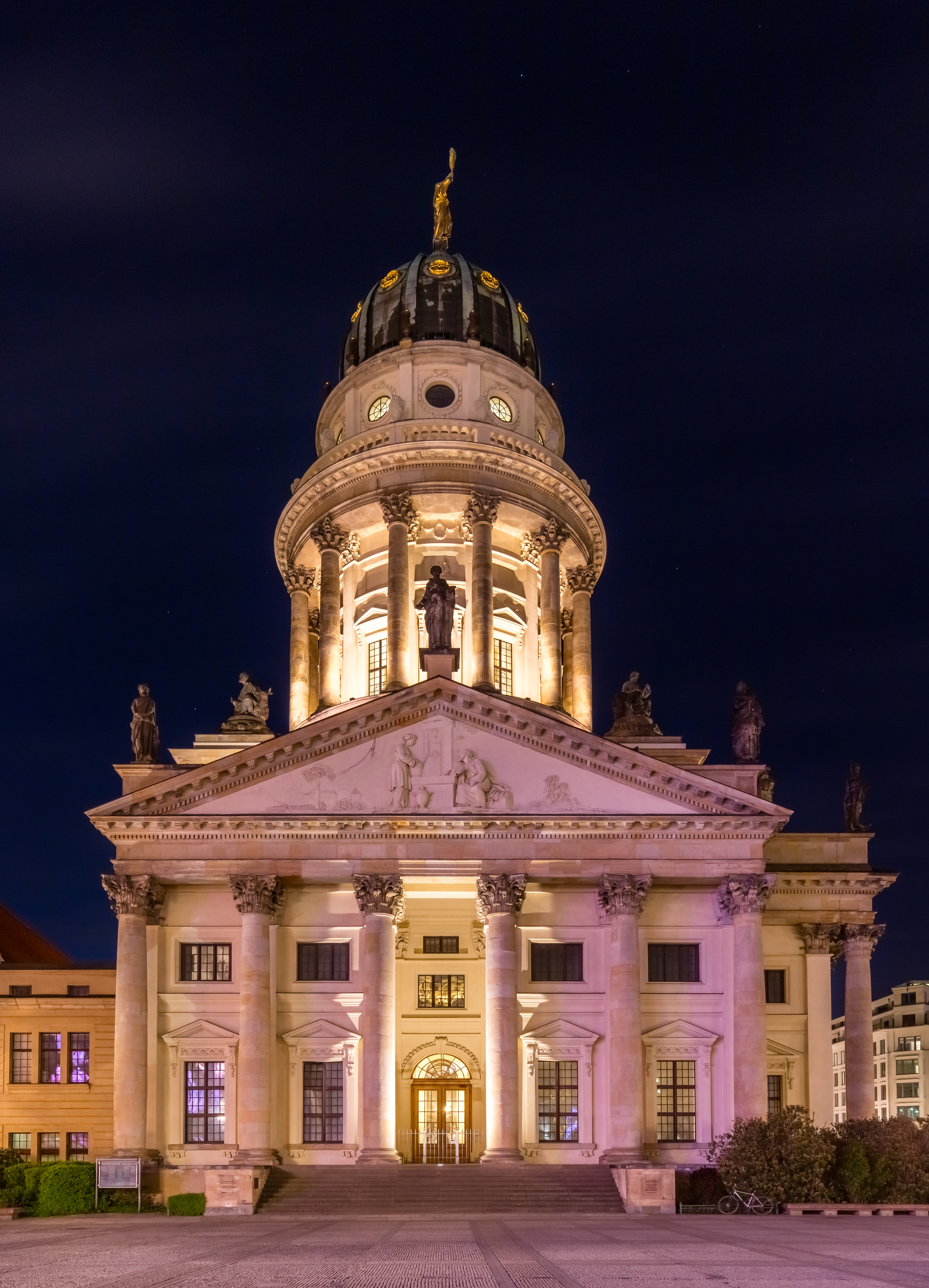
View from west, 2016
