= Rose (heraldry) =

Heraldic symbol

A rosa alba on the flag of Yorkshire

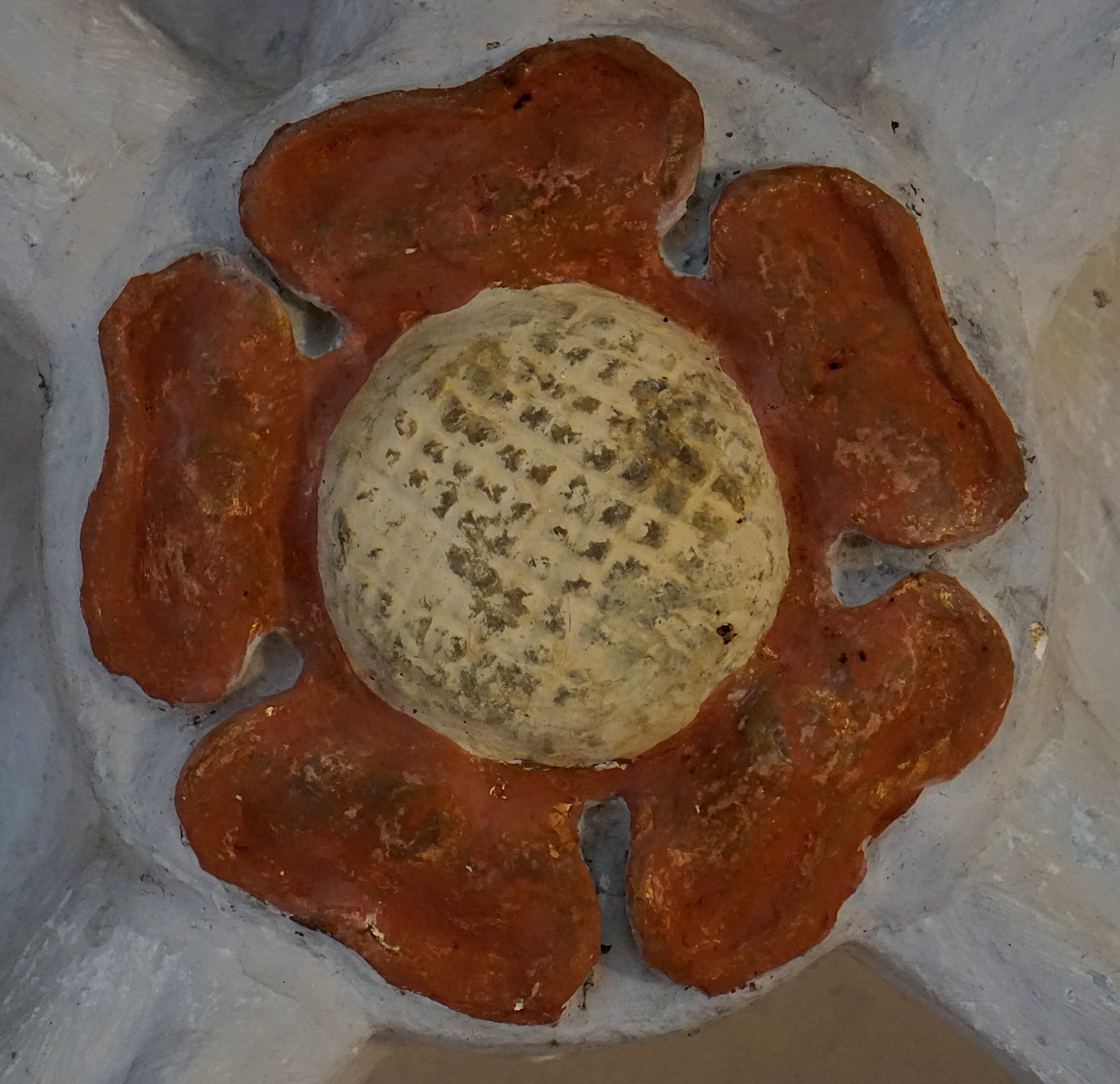
Heraldic rose as a keystone on the vault of a sacristy in Landshut

The rose is a common device in heraldry. It is often used both as a charge on a coat of arms and by itself as an heraldic badge. The heraldic rose has a stylized form consisting of five symmetrical lobes, five barbs, and a circular seed. The rose is one of the most common plant symbols in heraldry, together with the lily, which also has a stylistic representation in the fleur-de-lis.

The rose was the symbol of the English Tudor dynasty, and the ten-petaled Tudor rose (termed a double rose) is associated with England. Roses also feature prominently in the arms of the princely House of Lippe and on the seal of Martin Luther.

== Appearance ==
The normal appearance of the heraldic rose is a five-petaled rose, mimicking the look of a wild rose on a hedgerow. It is shown singly and full-faced. It most commonly has yellow seeds in the center and five green barbs as backing; such a rose is blazoned as barbed and seeded proper. If the seeds and barbs are of a different colour, then the rose is barbed and seeded of that/those tinctures. The rose of Lippe shown below, for example, is blazoned a Rose Gules, barbed and seeded Or.

Some variations on the rose have been used. Roses may appear with a stem, in which case they are described as slipped or stalked. A rose with a stalk and leaves may also be referred to as a damask rose, stalked and leaved, as appearing on the Canting arms of the House of Rossetti.

Rose branches, slips, and leaves have occasionally appeared in arms alone, without the flower. A combination of two roses, one within the other, is termed a double rose, famously used by the Tudors.

A rose sometimes appears surrounded by rays, which makes it a rose-en-soleil (rose in the sun). A rose may be crowned. Roses may appear within a chaplet, a garland of leaves with four flowers. In badges, it is not uncommon for a rose to be conjoined with another device. Catherine of Aragon's famous badge was a pomegranate conjoined with the double rose of her husband, Henry VIII.

== Usage ==
Heraldic roses feature prominently in English history. The two rival royal houses of the fifteenth century were supposedly known by their heraldic badges, the Red Rose of Lancaster and the White Rose of York, from which their long conflict was later called the Wars of the Roses. The White Rose of York was later used as the badge of Jacobitism in England and Scotland, and before World War I one of Britain's main Jacobite organizations was called the Order of the White Rose. Red and white roses appear in the civic heraldry of Lancashire and Yorkshire respectively.

The House of Tudor that came to power at the end of the wars used a combination of their two roses: the ten-petaled Tudor double rose. The double Tudor rose is always depicted as white on red on a field of any other tincture and is always termed 'proper'. It is used as a floral emblem of England, just as the thistle is associated with Scotland. It appears in the compartment of the coats of arms of both the United Kingdom and Canada. A red rose appears on the collar of the Order of the Garter.

The Luther rose, a rose combined with a ring, heart, and Latin cross, was used by Martin Luther as a personal seal. The Luther rose is sometimes used as a charge in its own right, appearing on the arms of a number of German towns.

In the English and Canadian systems of cadency, a small rose is the difference mark of a seventh son. In Portugal, a label with three roses was used to differentiate the arms of the Princes of Beira.

Roses appear in the coat of arms of Finland and are part of the insignia of officers (up to colonel) in the Finnish Army.

== Gallery ==
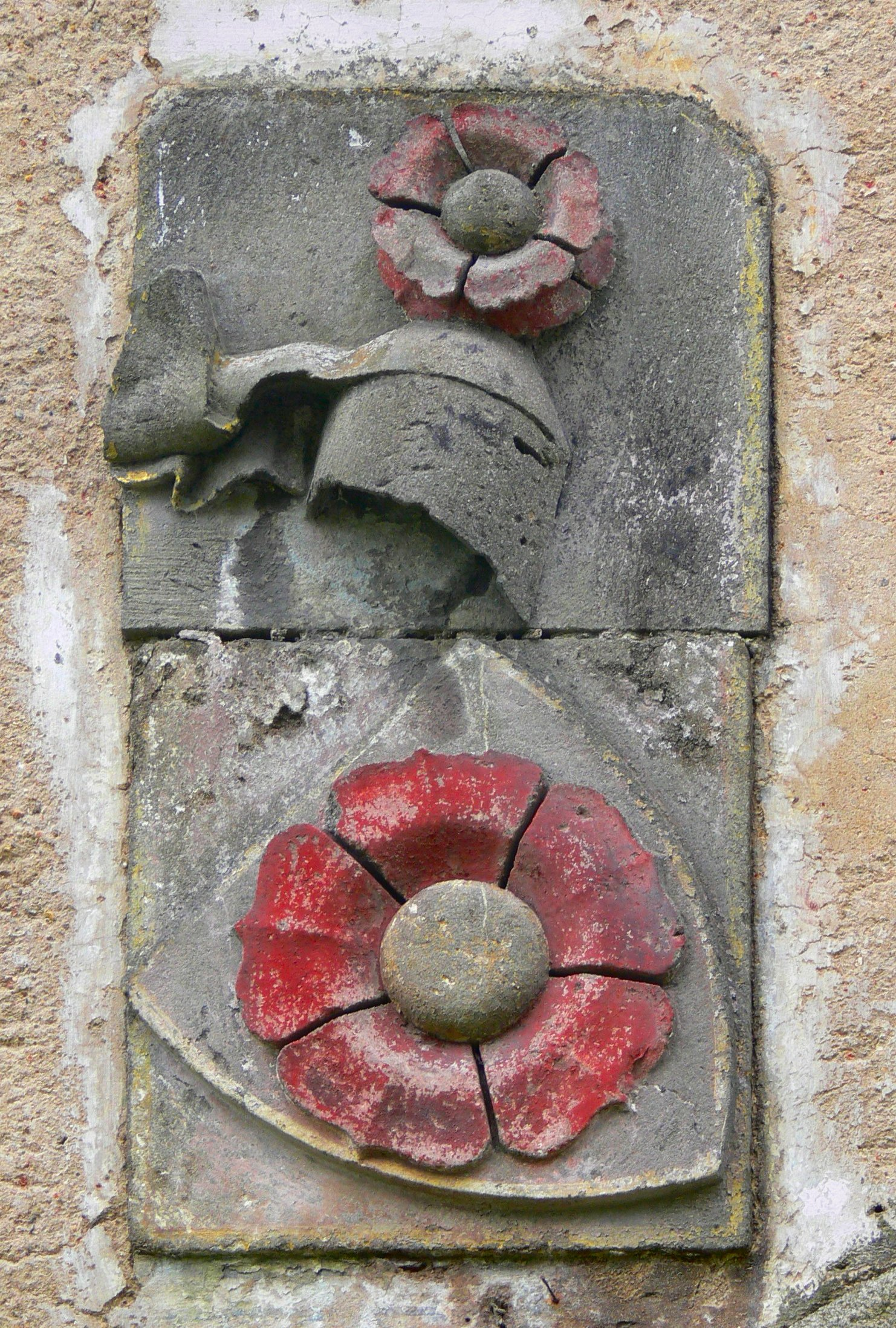
Canting arms of the House of Rosenberg as they appear on the gate of Vyšší Brod Monastery

Luther rose on the civic arms of Neuendettelsau, Germany

Tudor rose on the badge of the Yeomen of the Guard

Coat of Arms of Saint Lucia

Coat of arms of Lippe: Argent, a rose Gules barbed and seeded Or

The coat of arms of Finland

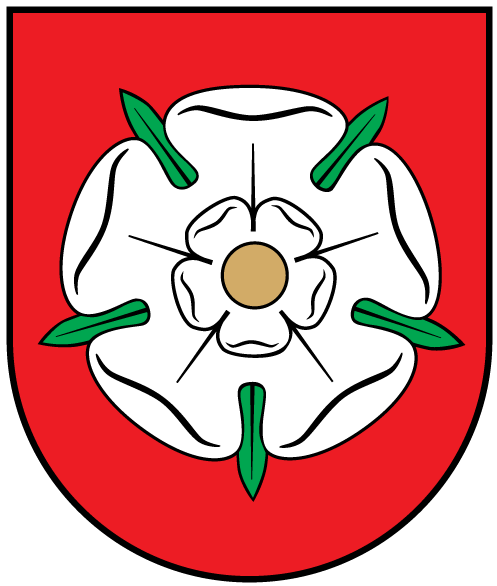
Coat of arms of Alytus

Coat of arms of Rosenheim

White rose pictured in the coat of arms of Viljandi
