= Isaac de Forcade de Biaix =

Prussian Army colonel

Hofmarschall Sir Isaac de Forcade de Biaix
- Isaak von Forcade de Biaix
- Born: c. 1703; Biaix Manor, Pau, Béarn, France
- Died: 21 January 1775; Potsdam, Brandenburg
- Title: Hofmarschall to the Prince of Prussia, Crown Prince Frederick William II, heir to the throne of Prussia
- Spouse(s): Anna Elisabeth de Cantenius (1738); Catherine von Vieregg (1763)
- Parent(s): presumably Isaac de Forcade, Seigneur de Biaix and Magdaleine Claire de Lalanne
- Military career
- Allegiance: Prussia
- Branch: Prussian Army
- Service years: 1722–1757
- Rank: Colonel
- Units: 23rd Prussian Infantry Regiment (1722-1738); 18th Prussian Infantry Regiment, aka Prince of Prussia Infantry Regiment (1738-1757)
- Commands: The Court of the Prince of Prussia, Crown Prince Frederick William II (1765-1775)
- Conflicts: First Silesian War; Second Silesian War; Seven Years' War
- Awards: Knight of the Order of Pour le Mérite (1740–42)

Isaac de Forcade de Biaix, aka Isaak de Forcade de Biaix, aka Isaac von Forcade de Biaix, aka Isaac von Forcade, aka Peter Isaac von Forcade, aka Isaak von Forcade (c. 1703, in Pau, Béarn – 21 January 1775, in Potsdam, Prussia), was a Kingdom of Prussia colonel, Hofmarschall to the Prince of Prussia and recipient of Prussia's highest military order of merit for heroism, Knight of the Order of Pour le Mérite. He was a descendant of the noble family of Forcade in Béarn, born as a Catholic, but emigrated to Brandenburg-Prussia at a young age, where he joined the Huguenot community in Berlin.

He is referred to in some historical sources as Isaac Quirin von Forcade, Marquis de Biaix, As with his uncle and first cousin, there is no evidence that he was ever a Marquis. Biaix was never, at any time in its history, a marquisate, but instead a noble manor in Pau (see also Manorialism).

== Military career ==
Historical sources related to the research of noble families in France erroneously state that he was a major general, as does the 25 July 1748 Catholic baptismal record for a niece, Elizabeth-Christine de Casamajor, at Saint-Martin's church in Pau, France. In reality, his first cousin, Friedrich Wilhelm Quirin von Forcade de Biaix was the Prussian major general in 1748.

=== Early Military Career in Prussia ===
- 1722, entered into Prussian military service, in the 23rd Prussian Infantry Regiment, at the time commanded by his uncle Jean de Forcade de Biaix, presumably immediately after his arrival from Béarn.
- May 1735, received the command of a newly created Grenadier Company in the 23rd Prussian Infantry Regiment in which he had served since his earliest days in Prussia.
- May 1738, received command of an Alexander von Friedeborn Musketeer Company in Cüstrin.
- 17 June 1738, a captain, transferred to the 18th Prussian Infantry Regiment (aka the Prince of Prussia Regiment after 1742) under the command of Major General Christian Reinhold von Derschau.
- Between 1738 and 1742, the different units of the regiment were garrisoned in Berlin-Spandau, Bernau, Strausberg, Altlandsberg and Oranienburg.

=== First Silesian War (1740–42) ===
He fought near Glogau Fortress (29 December 1740 – 2 January 1741), near Breslau (30 December 1740 – 3 January 1741), Ohlau (9 January 1741), the Siege of Neisse (15 – 22 January 1741), in skirmishes between Nossen and Lindenau (‘’2 March 1741’’), at Göding (‘’10 March 1742’’), and at the Siege of Brno (‘’31 March – 3 April 1742’’) in Moravia.

- 11 June 1742, as a captain, awarded Prussia's highest military order of merit for heroism, Knight of the Order of Pour le Mérite.

=== Second Silesian War (1744–45) ===
- 28 June 1744, the 18th Prussian Infantry Regiment, under the command of Prince Augustus William of Prussia since 10 November 1742, is renamed as The Prince of Prussia Regiment.

He fought with his unit at the Siege of Prague (2–18 September 1744), Beraun (6 September 1744), Selmitz (19 November 1744), Prague (25 November 1744), and the Battle of Hohenfriedberg (4 June 1745).

- 28 August 1745, promoted to major and de:Obristwachtmeister, in the 18th Prussian Infantry Regiment, since 10 November 1742 under the command of Prince Augustus William of Prussia.

He fought at the Battle of Soor (30 September 1745), Schönefeld near Leipzig (29 November 1745), Meißen (9 December 1745), and at the Battle of Kesselsdorf (15 December 1745).

- Between 1746 and 1755, the different units of the regiment were garrisoned in Berlin-Spandau, Strausberg, Altlandsberg and Oranienburg.
- 29 May 1756, promoted to lieutenant colonel, in the Prince of Prussia Infantry Regiment.

=== Seven Years' War (1754–63) ===
Fought at the Siege of Pirna (11 September – 14 October 1756).

- March 1757, promoted to colonel.

He fought at the Battle of Reichenberg near Kratzau (21 April 1757), the Battle of Prague (6 May – 20 June 1757), Witkow Mountain (Polish: Góra Witków, German: Ziskaberg) near Wittgendorf (9 May 1757), Angelka (3 June 1757), White Mountain (Czech: Bílé hoře, German: Weißen Berg) near Prague (20 June 1757), Wellemin (Czech: Velemín) (3 July 1757), on Löbau (8 August 1757), Hirschfeld near Reinsberg (17 August 1757), Burkersdorf (20 August 1757), Dittersbach auf dem Eigen and Kiesdorf auf dem Eigen (25 August 1757), the Battle of Moys (7 September 1757), Barschdorf (26 September 1757), the Battle of Breslau (22 November 1757), the Battle of Leuthen (5 December 1757), and at the Siege of Breslau (7–20 December 1757).

=== Retirement ===
- In the Winter of 1757, due to his ailing condition his request for retirement was granted.
- By 1764, the entire regiment was garrisoned in Potsdam, where it remained until 1794.
- 1765, appointed by the King as Hofmarschall to the Prince of Prussia, Crown Prince Frederick William II of Prussia.
- 1770, Provisor of the Berlin Freemason's African Owner-Builder Lodge (German: Afrikanische Bauherrenloge), Tricopherius and liaison to the Protector of the Prince of Prussia.

In all, he served the Royal house for 52 years, during which time he fought in the First Silesian War, the Second Silesian War and the Seven Years' War.

== Family ==
=== Coat of arms ===
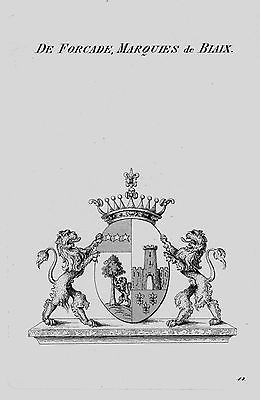
Forcade-Biaix coat of arms, Prussian Branch, circa 1820

The family motto of the Prussian branch is "In Virtute Pertinax".

Coat of arms: An escutcheon with the field divided into four parts. Left half: argent tincture, a gules lion holding a sinople eradicated oak tree between its paws; azure tincture charged with three or mullets; Right half: a gules castle with three towers on an argent tincture; sinople tincture charged with three argent roses below it. A Grafenkrone (Count's coronet) as helmut on top of the escutcheon, crested with a or fleur-de-lis. Two or lions supporting the escutcheon. Motto: "In Virtute Pertinax".

Heraldic symbolism: The lion symbolizes courage; the eradicated oak tree symbolizes strength and endurance; the towers are symbols of defense and of individual fortitude; the mullets (5-star) symbolizes divine quality bestowed by god; the rose is a symbol of hope and joy; the fleur-de-lis is the floral emblem of France; the coronet is a symbol of victory, sovereignty and empire. A count's coronet to demonstrate rank and because the family originally served the counts of Foix and Béarn during the English Wars in the Middle Ages.

=== Parents ===
Isaac de Forcade, Seigneur de Biaix, (* September 1659, Biaix in Pau, Béarn; bap. 13 September 1659, Morlaàs, Béarn; † 27 October 1737, Biaix in Pau, Béarn), attorney, Jurat in Pau, Legislator at the Parliament of Navarre in Pau, and his third wife Claire de Lalanne (oo 7 June 1694 Rontignon; † 22 March 1734, Biaix in Pau, Béarn.)

The French-language entry in a Stettin parish register for his 1738 marriage is one of only two known documents that establish his parental lineage. In this document, he states that he is a native of Pau, in Béarn, and that his parents were Jean de Forcade and Therèse de Lalande.

Although few documents exist to prove his parental line, his obituary notice published on the occasion of his death in 1775, which includes a curriculum vitae, begins by explaining that he was the nephew (German: Bruderssohn) of Lieutenant General Jean de Forcade de Biaix. According to detailed genealogical records, his uncle, Jean de Forcade de Biaix, had nine brothers, but did not have another brother by the same name who could have married a Therèse de Lalande. Instead, and because of the later use of de Biaix name as part of his surname in some historical sources in Prussia and France, he is thought to be the youngest son of Jean de Forcade de Biaix's eldest brother, Isaac de Forcade, Seigneur de Biaix and his third wife Claire de Lalanne, where his 1703-1704 birth fits neatly into a gap between the recorded baptisms for two other children, baptized 19 July 1703 and 13 April 1708.

The Roman Catholic parish register for Pau for time period around his birth may have originally recorded his birth and baptism, but records for 1704, with the exception of a handful of entries for the month of January, have been lost from the original register. The years surrounding 1704 are very chaotically recorded. What the parish register does clearly show, however, is that there was no married couple named Jean de Forcade and Therèse de Lalande, as named in his marriage record in Stettin, bearing children in Pau during the ten years before or after 1704.

This parish register, however, does record the baptism of an Isaac de Biaix, baptized 24 December 1707, son of, Jacques de Biaix and his wife Jeanne de Harpère.

Kurt von Priesdorff, in his ten volume work de:Soldatisches Führertum, claims without citing evidence or sources, that Isaac Quirin de Forcade, Marquis de Biaix was the son of Lieutenant General Jean de Forcade de Biaix and his wife Juliane, Freiin von Honstedt. Other scholarly works make the same claim, citing Priesdorff as their source. In the absence of proof to the contrary, and considering Priesdorff's privileged access to sources for his scholarly work, this possibility should not be completely ruled out, despite Isaac de Forcade de Biaix's 1738 marriage record citing his birthplace in Pau, Béarn as proof to the contrary.

=== Marriages ===
Isaac de Forcade de Biaix married on 16 July 1738 at the French Reformed Church in Stettin, with Anna Elisabeth de Cantenius, the daughter of Martin de Cantenius and his wife Sophie Dorothea Friedeborn.

He married a second time on 21 February 1763 with the widow Katharina von Eickstedt, née Catherine von Vieregg (baptized 26 April 1726, Rothenklempenow, Mecklenburg-Vorpommern; † 29 April 1795, Rothenklempenow, Mecklenburg-Vorpommern), the daughter of Georg IX. von Vieregg (1688-1753) and Margarethe Dorothee von Vieregg (1696-1766).

==== The Fiefs of Barsekwitz and Gollin ====
Anna Elisabeth de Cantenius acquired the fiefs of Barskewitz and Gollin, both mesne-fiefs (German: Afterlehne) of the Order of Saint John from the von Borck family in 1731 for 28,000 Reichsthaler and was ennobled on 3 September 1737 by King Frederick William I of Prussia with them. Gollin was a farming village, a dependency of Barskewitz (present day Barzkowice), now both suburbs of Gmina Stargard Szczeciński in Stargard County.

The Vassal Table of 1756 for the district lists him as the head of the household at his wife's properties.

A detailed inventory of the fiefs in 1784 states that, in addition to its many features and assets, Barskewitz also included a church belonging to the Jacobshagen Synod, itself a branch of the church in Pansin.

Following her death, the court in Sonnenburg ruled on 24 January 1765, that as her heir, the Lordship of her two fiefs passed to him.

His own last will and testament dated 7 April 1772 did not name any male children as heirs. In this will, he bequeathed that Gollin remain the property of his second wifeKatharina von Eickstedt. He further stipulated that Barskewitz be transferred upon his death to his eldest step-son, Ernst Friederich von Eickstedt, hereditary Herr of Hohenholz and Plossow, for an annual payment of 24,000 Reichsthaler, but only for the period of his lifetime. Furthermore, that upon the death of the preceding, it would again be transferred to his nephew, Captain Sir Friederich Wilhelm Sigismund von Aschersleben, Knight of the Order of Saint John, or his male heirs, and that should he no longer be living and not leave any male heirs, the property would subsequently transfer to the Canon (Domherr) Friedrich von Itzenplitz (believed to be his daughter's husband) and his male heirs, in exchange for the payment of the same amount.

The Vassal Table of 1802 shows that Barskewitz and Gollin were still owned by the von Itzenlitz family, the owner shown with the occupation of Landrat in the Kurmark. The 1 January 1862 directory of the Pomeranian Knighthood shows that the property was jointly owned by the Countess von Itzenplitz in Berlin and her husband, a von Meding, the retired Oberpräsident of the Geheimrat to the King of Prussia.

=== Children ===
An entry in the evangelical parish register for St. Jacob's church in Stettin, dated only as between Advent 1760 (30 November 1760) and Advent 1761 (29 November 1761), states that an "…unmarried noble daughter of Colonel Forcade, age 27 years…" was buried.

His marriage with Anna Elisabeth Cantenius is said to have been childless, thus extinguishing his branch of the family.

A step-daughter from his second marriage much later in life, Louise von Eickstedt (* 7 November 1749, Skanderborg, Denmark; † 10 July 1821), married a Canon (German: Domherr) in Havelberg Friedrich von Itzenplitz, Erbherr auf Gross- und Klein-Behnitz, Jerchel (1740-1772).

=== Other Family ===
- Uncle: Jean de Forcade de Biaix (1663-1729), was a Royal Prussian Lieutenant General. He was the Regimentschef of the 23rd Prussian Infantry Regiment, Commandant of the Royal Residence in Berlin, Gouverneur militaire of Berlin and Knight of the Order of the Black Eagle.
- First Cousin: Friedrich Wilhelm Quirin von Forcade de Biaix (1698-1765), was a Royal Prussian Lieutenant General and one of King Frederick the Great's most active and most treasured officers. He was Regimentschef of the 23rd Prussian Infantry Regiment, recipient of the Kingdom of Prussia's highest military order of merit, the Pour le Mérite, Knight of the Order of the Black Eagle, Canon of Havelberg, Castellan of Neuenrade in the County of Mark, Lord Seneschal of Zinna, President of the prestigious Ober-Collegium Sanitatis in Berlin and Lieutenant Governor of Breslau.

== Literature ==
- Fahrenkrüger, Johann Anton: Nathan Bailey's Dictionary English-German and German-English — Englisch-Deutsches und Deutsch-Englisches Wörterbuch. Gänzlich umgearbeitet. Zweiter Theil. Deutsch-Englisch. Zehnte, verbesserte und vermehrte, Auflage., Friedrich Frommann, Leipzig und Jena 1801 (in German and English)
- Lehmann, Gustaf: Die Ritter des Ordens pour le mérite. Auf Allerhöchsten Befehl Seiner Majestät des Kaisers und Königs, bearbeitet im Königlichen Kriegsministerium durch Gustav Lehmann, wirklichen geheimen Kriegsrat und vortragenden Rat im Kriegs-Ministerium, Erster Band: 1740-1811, Ernst Siegfried Mittler und Sohn, Berlin 1913 (in German)
- Lehmann, Gustaf: Die Ritter des Ordens pour le mérite. Auf Allerhöchsten Befehl Seiner Majestät des Kaisers und Königs, bearbeitet im Königlichen Kriegsministerium durch Gustav Lehmann, wirklichen geheimen Kriegsrat und vortragenden Rat im Kriegs-Ministerium, Zweiter Band: 1812-1913, Ernst Siegfried Mittler und Sohn, Berlin 1913, (in German)
