= Jean de Forcade de Biaix =

Huguenot military leader in Prussia

His Excellency Lieutenant General Jean de Forcade de Biaix
- Johann Quirin von Forcade de Biaix
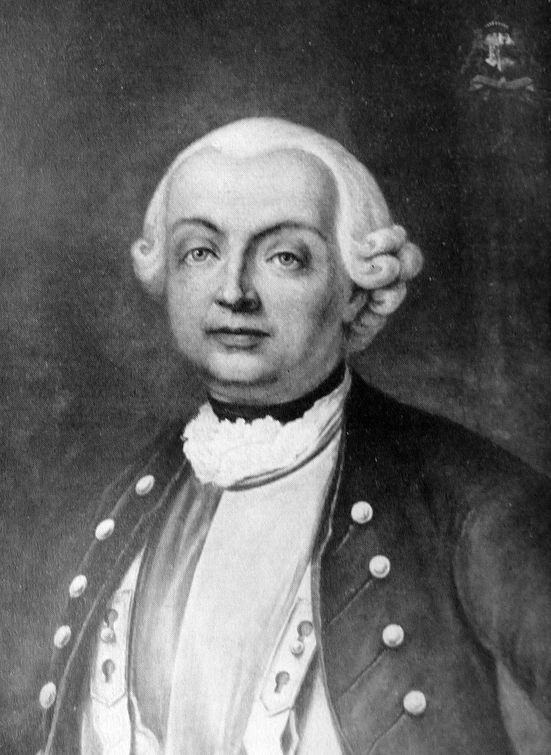
- Jean de Forcade de Biaix, as a major general, c. 1718
- Born: Jean de Forcade de Biaix; 14 December 1663; Biaix Manor, Pau, Béarn, France
- Died: 2 February 1729 (aged 65); Berlin, Kingdom of Prussia
- Burial place: Crypt of General de Corneau under the Friedrichstadtkirche, Berlin, Brandenburg
- Children: 5, most notably: Friedrich Wilhelm Quirin von Forcade de Biaix
- Parent: Jean de Forcade, Seigneur de Biaix
- Military career
- Allegiance: Prussia
- Branch: Prussian Army
- Service years: 1685–1729
- Rank: Lieutenant general
- Units: Elector's Bodyguards; 1st White Fusilier Guards
- Commands: 23rd Prussian Infantry Regiment; Military Governor of Berlin; Commandant of the Royal Residence in Berlin
- Conflicts: Great Northern War: Siege of Stralsund; Storming of the Peenemuende Lair; Rügen Island
- Awards: Knight of the Order of the Black Eagle

Jean de Forcade de Biaix, a.k.a. Jean de Forcade, Marquis de Biaix, a.k.a. Jean-Quirin de Forcade de Biaix, a.k.a. Jean Quérin von Forcade, Herr von Biaix, a.k.a. Johann Querin de Forcade, Herr zu Biaix, a.k.a. Johann Quirin von Forkade de Biaix (14 December 1663 – 2 February 1729), was a Huguenot, a descendant of the noble family of Forcade and lieutenant general in the service of the Kingdom of Prussia. He was the Regimentschef of the 23rd Prussian Infantry Regiment, commandant of the Royal Residence in Berlin, Gouverneur militaire of Berlin, a Knight of the Order of the Black Eagle a member of King Frederick I of Prussia's "Tobacco Collegium". and president of the Grand Directoire 1718–1729, the deliberative and decision-making body responsible for all Huguenot affairs in the kingdom.

Although there are references to Jean de Forcade de Biaix as the "Marquis de Biaix" in some Prussian sources published between 1788 and 1837, there is no evidence that he was ever a Marquis. The noble manor of Biaix in the city of Pau was never a marquisate, at any time in its history.

He was also never the Seigneur de Biaix, as stated in some historical Prussian sources. The title Seigneur was not hereditary. In the case of his family, his father, who purchased Biaix manor in 1659, was the Seigneur de Biaix. Following the father's death in 1684, the property and the right to enter the Order of Nobility of the Estates of Béarn were passed to the eldest son, Jean's elder brother, Isaac de Forcade de Biaix (Seigneur de Biaix 1684–1737).

== Life in France ==
Little is known about his early life. His parents were Protestant. Protestant church records do not exist for the period between 1617 and 1667 for the Temple in Pau. Historical records published in the 19th century related to the research of noble families in France claim that only two branches of this family descended from the parents, and that the only surviving branch was the Prussian one.

Protestant baptismal records for the Temple in Pau for the period 1668–1681 and 1673–1684, however, point to a large family with no fewer than 11 children, of which six sons to carry the name forward. What happened to the rest of the family is unknown.

== Emigration to Prussia ==
Jean de Forcade de Biaix, unlike his father and eldest brother, did not abjure from Protestantism. Like many Huguenots, he left Béarn in religious exile after the revocation of the Edict of Nantes by the Edict of Fontainebleau in October 1685 and went to Brandenburg, where Frederick I of Prussia, the Elector of Brandenburg, was actively encouraging Huguenot immigration.

Frederick I of Prussia, Elector of Brandenburg and future King of Prussia, saw an immediate interest in what Huguenot Refugees could represent for his country. Indeed, he was both a francophile and an admirer of the French. In October 1685, he published the Edict of Potsdam granting the Huguenots everything the Edict of Fontainebleau refused them: safe passage to Brandenburg, freedom to live and work where they chose, religious freedom and the right to worship in their native French, tax exemptions for 10 years, and more, going as far as granting them the same rights as citizens of the states of Brandenburg-Prussia. Meanwhile, his envoy to King Louis XIV of France's court at Versailles, the Count of Schwerin, dispensed subsidies and passports to all who requested them, provided, of course, that those requesting appeared to be of some benefit to his sovereign. As a result, the Kingdom of Prussia became for many Huguenots, in particular for the noblesse militaire, the ideal place of refuge, for Jean de Forcade de Biaix.

Whereas there were only about 400 Huguenots in the Kingdom of Prussia in 1685, two years later, 20,000 French had established themselves. ·Berlin and Frankfurt on the Oder, the Kingdom of Prussia's two major cities, who each had 7,000 inhabitants in 1685, almost doubled in size within five years as a result of the French contribution and thanks to Frederick I of Prussia's generous offer of land and houses to the religious exiles.

Huguenot Noblemen and officers flocked to the military, where letters patent granted them the same rank they previously held in France, with the youngest among them granted entry ranks as ensigns or lieutenants, while in parallel new roles were created for notaries public, members of the bar and members of parliament, and lastly, businessmen and tradesmen were offered significant opportunities to start new industrial activities.

== Life in Prussia ==
By October 1686, Jean de Forcade de Biaix began a military career that would span 41 years, raise him to the highest military rank in the Prussian Army, lead him into posts in the civil administration of Prussia, and have him placed by Frederick William I of Prussia at the head of administration and decision-making for all Huguenot colonies in the kingdom from 1718 until his death in 1729.

- In October 1686, lieutenant in the Elector of Brandenburg's militia in Frankfurt (Oder).
- 1688, captain in the Elector's Bodyguards in Frankfurt (Oder).
- 1692, captain in the Prussian Guard in Crossen (Oder).
- 1699, captain in the Elector's Bodyguards in Berlin.

He remained in the rank of captain for nearly fifteen years, humbly performing his occupation as a soldier.

But two events enabled him to rise out of subordinate functions. In 1697, he married the Baroness Juliane von Honstedt from an old Württembergian family, who also had the advantage of being the daughter of a major general in the service of Prussia. At the same time, the Electors of Brandenburg become the Kings of Prussia in 1701, and Frederick William I of Prussia, the future King of Prussia, befriended him. Jean de Forcade de Biaix pleased him and his career began to show it.

Frederick William I of Prussia, known as the "Soldier King", who would later become the organizer of the Prussian Army, particularly appreciated three things: tobacco (Potsdam's Tabagies became famous); soldiers, especially if they were very tall; and lastly, thrift (he was known for a selfish greed). Concerning this latter, he especially appreciated French Huguenots, and is said to have admiringly exclaimed: "These are the only French who are satisfied with a single frog per day!" He found all three qualities Jean de Forcade de Biaix.

- On 12 September 1702, promoted to major in the Prussian White Fusilier Guards (later the 1st Prussian Infantry Regiment).
- Promoted on 12 August 1705 to lieutenant colonel.
- 1711, promoted to colonel.
- 1713, a colonel in General Field Marshall Count von Wartensleben's Infantry Regiment, renamed that year to the 1st Prussian Infantry Regiment, appointed as Gouverneur militaire of Berlin, a.k.a. Commandant of Berlin.

In this latter position, he reigned over his garrison with discipline and gained a reputation as one of the most severe military governors of Berlin. He is thought to be the founder of the famous "Prussian Drill" that would become the admiration of numerous generations of military to follow. Each night during the fifteen years of his governorship, he would send a letter to King Frederick William I of Prussia in which he recounted in detail the events of the day, allegedly without ever forgetting a single one.

- In February 1716, as a colonel, given the command of the 23rd Prussian Infantry Regiment, then garrisoned in Berlin

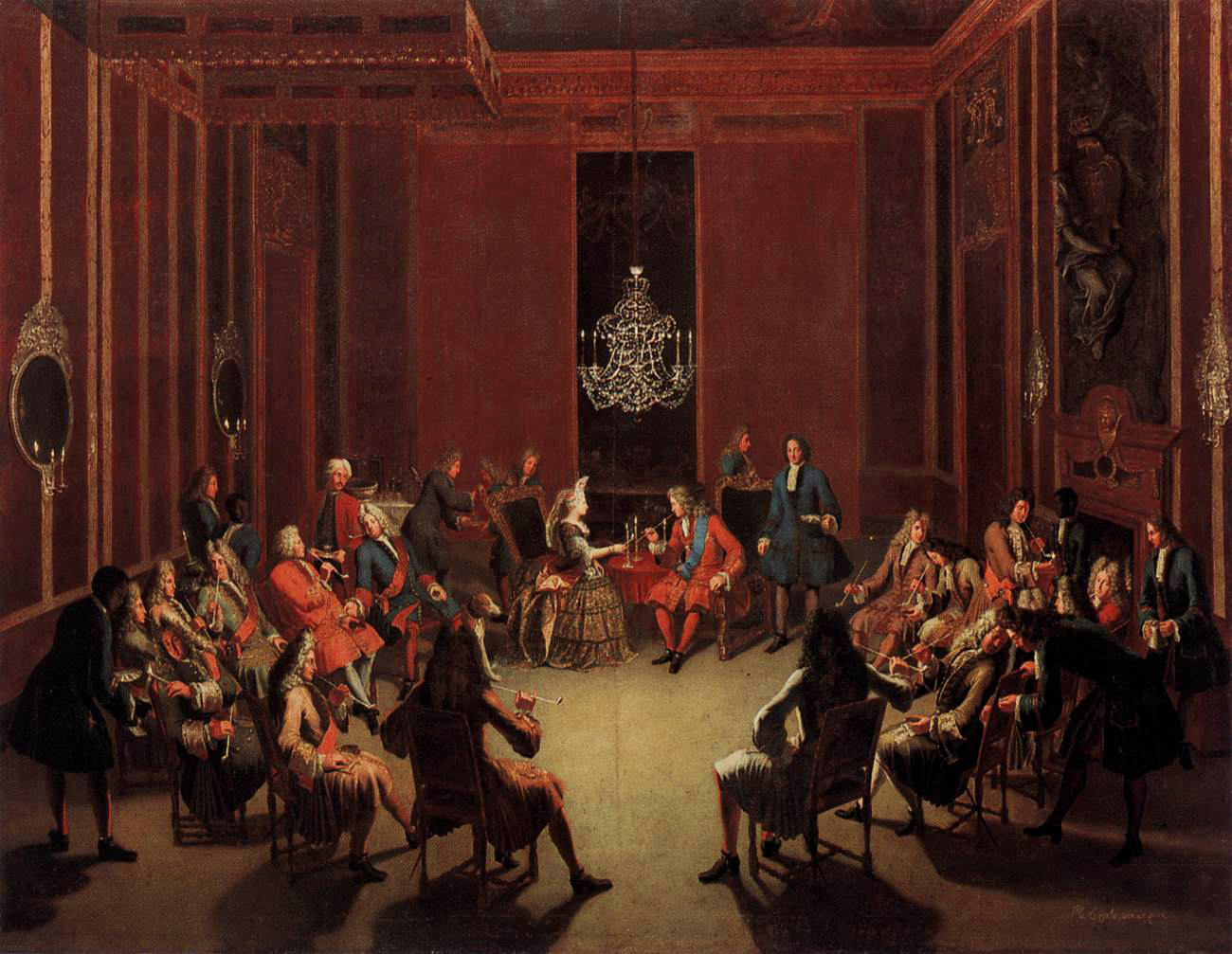
Tabakskollegium Frederick I. of Prussia, circ 1710

Jean de Forcade de Biaix was an avid and active member of the Tobacco Collegium (German: Tabakskollegium), the aeropagus before which, at the Royal Court in Berlin, the affairs of domestic and foreign policy were discussed. Smoking was mandatory. The smoking lounge (German: Tabakstube) was set up based on the Dutch model, like a Great Hall. Every evening at six o'clock the Tobacco Collegium came together and remained until ten o'clock or longer. Other members included: Friedrich Wilhelm von Grumbkow, Leopold I, Prince of Anhalt-Dessau, affectionately referred to as "the old Dessauer", Count Alexander von Dönhoff, Colonel von Derschau, the Generals von Gerstorf and von Sydow, General Peter von Blankensee, affectionately called "Blitzpeter" at court, Caspar Otto von Glasenapp, Christoph Adam von Flanz, Dubislav Gneomar von Natzmer, Heinrich Karl von der Marwitz, Friedrich Wilhelm von Rochow, Wilhelm Dietrich von Buddenbrock, Arnold Christoph von Waldow, Johann Christoph Friedrich von Haake and the occasional invited minister and ambassador, on a case-by-case basis.

Following the death of Lieutenant General Count Otto Magnus von Dönhoff on 14 December 1717, who had hitherto been the Prussian minister responsible for all Huguenot colonies in Prussia, Frederick William I, then just five years into his reign, assembled the French in Berlin and gave them the freedom to choose from his ministers the one in whom they had the greatest confidence as his replacement. This was accepted with great joy, but at the same time (3 January 1718), the King asked that whoever the colony chose as the new minister be considered as the most appropriate choice. To ensure the choice was appropriate, he handed the matter over to the then Commandant of Berlin, Colonel von Forcade, who historians recounting the event described as "…a brave soldier, but scientifically speaking, quite uneducated."

Despite his educational handicap, Colonel von Forcade has been called "one of the most important figures in the reformed emigration," and he enjoyed the full confidence of King Frederick William I. Following the death Count von Dönhoff, it was in von Forcade's house in Berlin on 3 January 1718 that the petition from the representatives of the colony to the King was written and signed to thank him for having left the choice of a new protector to them.

"…We are persuaded, there is not one of your Majesty's Ministers, who is not equally disposed to treat us with the same Goodness, the late Count Denhoff (sic) used to have for us; however, SIRE, if one of them must absolutely be chosen, who can do it better than your Majesty, whose Penetration nothing escapes, and who has condescended to show such an Attention, to every Thing, which is for our good, and for our Advantage? 'Tis this makes us take the Liberty of most humbly intreating your Majesty, that you will yourself please to name that Person of your Ministers, whom you shall judge most proper to fulfil (sic) your Intentions to us. Your Majesty's Choice is much more certain than ours, because it is guided and enlightened by your paternal Goodness…"

- Promoted on 31 May 1718 to major general.

Frederick William I had implanted numerous Huguenot colonies in Lithuania, but refused to provide them with the requested French-speaking pastors, instead placing them under the Consistorium of the German Reformed Church and ensuring that they received pastors who were perfectly bilingual French-German.

On 9 March 1719, the King founded a new quorum named the Grand Directoire a.k.a. Conseil françois (sic) in Berlin under the presidency of General von Forcade, [wrong reference] which would have the responsibility of representing the best interests of the Huguenot colonies. This would entail filling vacant positions, distributing aid to the needy, and supporting commerce and manufacturing. In addition to appointing General von Forcade as president, he appointed members of the Huguenot colony from the ranks of the military and the civil service, his Royal Court, the Council of Commerce, as well as two pastors. This new deliberative assembly represented therewith all affairs and matters of the Huguenot colonies in the kingdom.

On 29 February 1720, with General von Forcade at the head of all Huguenot affairs in the kingdom, to the benefit of all Huguenot refugees, Frederick William I renewed the edicts and declarations, privileges, liberties, and advantages enacted by his predecessors, and determined that all Frenchmen who left their fatherland for religious reasons would benefit from the advantages of the Naturalization Edict of 13 May 1709 and other advantages granted earlier, in particular the 15-year exemption from all charges and taxes (with the exception of excise), and decreed that all Huguenots would fall under the jurisdiction of French courts established in the kingdom.

- During 1721, because of the increasing size of the Berlin garrison, which was increased to four regiments of infantry and one battalion of artillery, a special commission and treasury were established to examine the manner the new troops were being provided for. At the head of this commission was General von Forcade, then Commandant of Berlin, who was described as "…a very brave soldier, who knew nothing of the whole thing, spoke only very broken German, and could scarcely write his name…".

The newly reorganized Huguenot colonies under the Grand Directoire and General von Forcade received these edicts with tremendous gratitude and reassurance, and found effective protection from the King against the often violent levies that government officials from time-to-time attempted to impose. Above all, Frederick William I continued to welcome the Huguenots with steadfast kindness. He increased the retirement pensions of the colony's clergy to 15,000 Thalers, founded two new colonies in Stettin (1721) and in Potsdam (1723), and showered them abundantly special privileges. The Grand Directoire under General von Forcade facilitated construction projects such as the Klosterkirche (1726), the Luisenstadtkirche (1727), and the Hospitalkirche in Berlin, as well as the French reformed churches in Königsberg and Frankfurt an der Oder. Frederick William I emphatically preserved the colony's privileges, even in their disputes with provincial authorities, in particular those concerning the use of the French language, thereby continually attracting newcomers to the colonies, especially in Berlin and other notable cities, acquiring large numbers of competent officials for his administrations.

- 8 September 1721, as the president of the Grand Directoire, Jean de Forcade de Biaix laid the cornerstone of the new French church, the Klosterkirche, in the Klosterstrasse.
- 1722, appointed as commandant of the Royal Residence in Berlin (earlier, in 1714, according to some sources.)
- 24 February 1727, General de Forcade, major general in the armies of His Majesty, commandant in Berlin, was admitted as a citizen (French: bourgeois interne) by a letter from the Council of State of the Principality of Neuchâtel sent to him on this date. In an entry dated 13 February 1727 in the Manuals du Conseil d'État the following entry is recorded:
Based on the requisition made by General de Forcade, His Majesty's Commandant, for the purpose of being naturalized in this State, and to obtain permission to enter the bourgeoisie in the city of Neuchâtel. After deliberation, he has been informed that his request is graciously granted, free of charge for the King, and the letters of naturalization and the aforementioned permission will be sent to him, in the same manner as those drawn up for Monsieur the Count de Wartensleben, on the same subject (see Chancellery Acts, 1724–41, p. 10).
- He was promoted posthumously on 2 February 1729 to lieutenant general.

== Family ==
=== Coat of arms ===
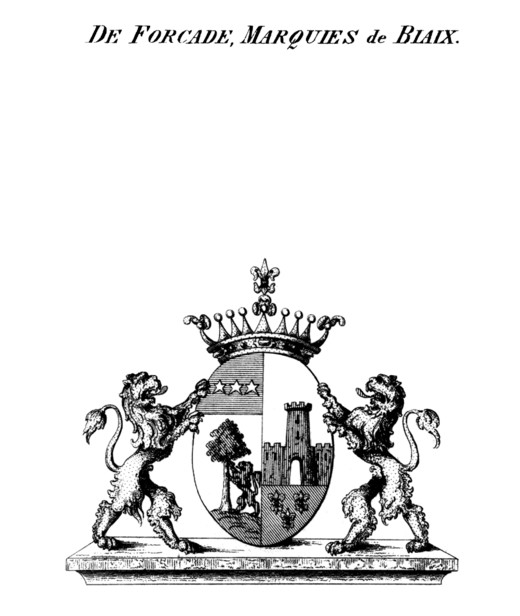
Coat-of-Arms, Forcade, Marquies de Biaix, Prussian Branch, pre-1856

The family motto of the Prussian branch is "In Virtute Pertinax".

Coat of Arms: An escutcheon with the field divided into four parts. Left half: argent tincture, a gules lion holding a sinople eradicated oak tree between its paws; azure tincture charged with three or mullets; Right half: a gules castle with three towers on an argent tincture; sinople tincture charged with three argent roses below it. A Grafenkrone (Count's coronet) as helmut on top of the escutcheon, crested with an or fleur-de-lis. Two or lions supporting the escutcheon. Motto: "In Virtute Pertinax".

Heraldic Symbolism: The lion symbolizes courage; the eradicated oak tree symbolizes strength and endurance; the towers are symbols of defense and of individual fortitude; the mullets (5-star) symbolizes divine quality bestowed by god; the rose is a symbol of hope and joy; the fleur-de-lis is the floral emblem of France; the coronet is a symbol of victory, sovereignty and empire. A Count's coronet to demonstrate rank and because the family originally served the counts of Foix and Béarn during the English Wars in the Middle Ages.

=== Parents ===
Jean de Forcade de Biaix's parents are erroneously cited in various Prussian historical sources between 1767 and 1861 as the French Field Marshall Jaques de Forcade, Seigneur de Biaix and Philippine d'Espalungue, Baronne d'Arros. Whether this information was intentionally provided false, or unintentionally in error, is a matter of pure speculation. These same sources state that the family origins were in Spain before Béarn, most likely referring to what had been the Kingdom of Navarre, which was split between the Kingdom of France and the Kingdom of Spain, with the part south of the Pyrénées becoming a part of Spain in 1521, and the part north of the Pyrénées becoming the Kingdom of Navarre-Béarn, before becoming a part of France in 1589, when King Henry III of Navarre inherited the French throne as Henry IV of France. In 1620 it was merged into the France.

Indeed, his parents were Protestant noble Jean de Forcade, Seigneur de Biaix († 1684 in Pau), fermier des monnaies de Béarn et Navarre (minter of coins for Béarn and Navarre), who was married 23 December 1659 at the Protestant Temple in Morlaàs with Madeleine de Lanne († aft. 1701), daughter of Ramon de Lanne, Bourgeois in Pau.

=== Marriage ===
Jean de Forcade de Biaix was married on 15 April 1697 at the French Cathedral in Berlin, on the order of Frederick III Prince-elector of Brandenburg, by Pastor Bancelin, Senior, with the Baroness Juliane von Honstedt, a.k.a. Juliane von Hohnstädt, from the noble house of Erdeborn. Juliane was the daughter of Royal Prussian major general Quirin, Erbherr (Allod) von Honstedt, Herr of Sulzau, Weikenburg and Erdeborn, a.k.a. Quirin, Freiherr von Hohnstädt, (1640–1699) and his wife Maria Magdalena Streiff von Lauenstein, of Falkenau, Diedenhosten and Bacour (1647–1697).

Jean de Forcade de Biaix was said to have also maintained a mistress at the royal court by the name of Mademoiselle la Letti a Governess to Friederike Sophie Wilhelmine of Prussia, that he apparently shared with Philippe Forneret, an elder of the French Temple in Luisenstaft (French: l'Église de Köpenick), then pastor of the French Temple in Berlin-Friedrichstadt, and later a Conseiller to the King in his Consistoire Supérieur. La Letti was the daughter of an Italian monk who had run away from his monastery and settled in Holland. She was infamous for having beaten Friederike Sophie Wilhelmine of Prussia throughout her youth, until she was finally discovered and dismissed.

=== Children ===
Two sons and three daughters are known to have been born out of this marriage. Three of the children were born before 31 December 1699. The second eldest son, Friedrich Wilhelm Quirin von Forcade de Biaix, covered the name de Forcade de Biaix with glory.

- Friedrich Wilhelm de Forcade de Biaix, a.k.a. Frideric Guillaume de Forcade, King Frederick I of Prussia's Godson, (* 10 February 1698, Berlin, Brandenburg; † 11 June 1735, Berlin, Brandenburg), as the Captain de Forcade. His baptism was performed on 16 February 1698 at the City Palace (German: Berliner Schloss), in the personal apartments of His Royal Highness Prince Frederick III, Elector of Brandenburg, the future King of Prussia, Frederick William I of Prussia, who also personally presented the child for baptism and after whom the child was named. Assisting was Major General Count and Burgrave Alexandre zu Dohna-Schlobbiten, Minister of State and Grand Gouverneur responsible for the education of the Crown Prince Elector of Brandenburg, and by Major General Quirin Freiherr von Honstedt, maternel grandfather, all three designated as his Godfathers. Also present and assisting were the Countess Emilie Luise zu Dohna-Carwinden, wife of the Count zu Dohna-Schlobbiten, Henriette Freiin von Pölnitz, wife of Lieutenant General Count du Hamel, and Susanne le Chènevix de Béville, widow of major general Jean de Streiff von Lauenstein, all three designated as his Godmothers. Captain Jean de Forcade de Biaix was the Captain of the Guard of his personal bodyguards at the time. At least on historical source states that the child died before his father in 1729, but this source was published in 1894, almost 160 years after his death and appears to be in error.
- Quirin Friedrich von Forcade de Biaix, a.k.a. Quirin Frideric de Forcade a.k.a. Friedrich Wilhelm Quirin von Forcade de Biaix (* 11 January 1699, Berlin, Brandenburg; † 23 March 1765, Berlin, Brandenburg), the Royal Prussian Lieutenant General. His baptism was performed on 18 January 1699 at the Berlin Cathedral (German: Berliner Dom). Colonel de:Wilhelm von Brandt, Regimentschef of the 14th Prussian Infantry Regiment presented the child for baptism, assisted by the Baron Albrecht Gottlob Gans Edle Herr zu Putlitz, a.k.a. Baron de Putlitz-Neuhaus and the mother's brother Eberhard Wilhelm, Baron von Honstedt, Captain Lieutenant of the Guard of the personal bodyguards of His Royal Highness Prince Frederick III, Elector of Brandenburg, all three designated as his Godfathers. Also present and assisting were Anna Sophia Helena von Ohr, wife of major general de:Georg Abraham von Arnim, Baron de Putlitz's wife, and Baron von Menssinger's wife, all three designated as his Godmothers. Captain Jean de Forcade de Biaix was the Captain of the Guard of the personal bodyguards of His Royal Highness Prince Frederick III, Elector of Brandenburg at the time.
- Louise Madeleine von Forcade de Biaix, a.k.a. Louise Madeleine de Forcade (* 3 December 1699, Berlin, Brandenburg). She was baptized on 12 December 1699 at the Berlin Cathedral (German: Berliner Dom). Brigadier Albrecht Konrad Finck von Finckenstein, Colonel of His Royal Highness Prince Frederick III, Elector of Brandenburg's 14th Infantry Regiment, presented her for baptism, assisted by Otto von Schwerin, Gentilhomme, Chamberlain to His Royal Highness Prince Frederick III, Elector of Brandenburg and the Baron Albrecht Gottlob Gans Edle Herr zu Putlitz, Herr of Wolfshagen, Marshall of the Old Market (French: Maréchal de la Vielle Marché), all three designated as her Godfathers. Also present and assisting were Mademoiselle von Hoff, Maid-in-Waiting (French: Demoiselle d'honneur) to Her Royal Highness Sophia Charlotte of Hanover, the Electress of Brandenburg, the wife of the Hofmarschall (French: Maréchal de la Cour) General von Wentzel, and Colonel von Schenkendorf's wife, all three designated as her Godmothers. Captain Jean de Forcade de Biaix was the captain in the regiment of His Royal Highness Prince Frederick III, Elector of Brandenburg's personal bodyguards at the time.
- Charlotte Louise Elisabeth von Forcade de Biaix, a.k.a. Charlotte Louise Elizabeth de Forcade (* 14 December 1700, Berlin, Brandenburg). She was baptized on 14 December 1700 at the Berlin Cathedral (German: Berliner Dom). Ernest Bausela de Kameke, Gentilhomme, Squire Tranckant to His Royal Highness Prince Frederick III, Elector of Brandenburg presented her for baptism, assisted by Ladislaus, Baron de Blumenthal, son of Christophe Gaspard, Baron de Blumenthal, the King's Special Envoy and Agent of Brandenburg, and Adrian de Poydoré Councillor to the Embassies of His Royal Highness Prince Frederick III, Elector of Brandenburg, all three designated as her Godfathers. Also present and assisting were Dame Louise Egide de Bergen, Dame Charlotte, Baronne de Canitz, second wife and widow of the satirical poet Frédéric-Rodolphe-Louis, Baron de Canitz et Dame Elizabeth de Narbonne, Rozet de Baumont's wife, all three designated as her Godmothers. Captain Jean de Forcade de Biaix was the captain in the regiment of His Royal Highness Prince Frederick III, Elector of Brandenburg's personal bodyguards at the time.
- Sophie Philippine von Forcade de Biaix, a.k.a. Philippina Sophia de Forcade a.k.a. Sophie Philippine von Forcade (* about 1704), married on 28 June 1729 in Berlin with Paul Albret Theuenin des Glereaux, a.k.a. Paul Albrecht de Glereau, (* 19 October 1688, Königsberg, East Prussia; † before 1739), a captain in the 23rd Prussian Infantry Regiment, a.k.a. the von Sidow Regiment. On 12 June 1739 in Königsberg, East Prussia, as a widow, she remarried with Georg Wilhelm von Aschersleben (1704–1775), president of the Pomeranian War and Domain Chamber ("Pomeranian Kriegs- und Domänenkammer" a.k.a. "Kammer- und Kommerz Collegii") in Stettin, responsible for the financial and fiscal administration of Pomerania.

One of the two daughters, Louise Madeleine von Forcade de Biaix or Charlotte Louise Elisabeth von Forcade de Biaix, may have married a von Woldeck. Historical literature published in 1799 about the Huguenot community in Prussia make specific reference to such a marriage, but without precision as to whether it was a daughter or a sister of Friedrich Wilhelm Quirin von Forcade de Biaix.

=== Ancestry ===
Ancestors of Jean de Forcade de Biaix

16. Jean de Laforcade, Seigneur de La Fitte-Suzon († 1639)
8. Pierre de Forcade (* ca. 1575)
17. NN de Lucmajour
4. Isacq de Forcade (* ca. 1600, ∞ 1624)
9. Marie de Maserolles
2. Jean de Forcade, Seigneur de Biaix (* ca. 1634, ∞ 1659, † 1684)
10. Pierre de Bordes
5. Marie de Bordes
11. Marie de Foron
1. Jean de Forcade de Biaix
6. Raymond de Lanne
3. Magdeleine de Lanne

=== Other Notable Family ===
==== First generation ====
- Brother: Isaac de Forcade, Seigneur de Biaix, attorney, Jurat in Pau, Legislator at the Parliament of Navarre, (* 1659, Pau; bap. 13 September 1659, Morlaàs; 27 October 1737, Pau); three marriages: Adriane de Lafitte (before 1683), Jeanne de Séris (before 1688) and Claire de Lalanne (7 June 1694, Rontignon). Seigneur de Biaix (1684–1737).

==== Second generation ====
In addition to his son Friedrich Wilhelm Quirin von Forcade de Biaix, who bathed the family name in glory and was twice knighted by King Frederick the Great, his nephew Isaac de Forcade de Biaix also brought honor to the family as a second Knight of the Order of Pour le Mérite, and as Hofmarschall to the Prince of Prussia, His Royal Highness Crown Prince Frederick William II, heir to the throne of Prussia.

- Nephew: Jean-Jacob de Forcade, Seigneur de Biaix, attorney, Legislator at the Parliament of Navarre, (* about 1694, Biaix Manor, Pau, Béarn, France; † 28 June 1743, Pau, Béarn, France). Seigneur de Biaix (1738–1743).
- Niece: Marthe-Catherine de Forcade de Biaix, (* 19 July 1703, Biaix Manor, Pau, Béarn, France; † 18 November 1777, Arros-de-Nay, Béarn); married 9 February 1727 in Nay with Henri III. d'Espalungue, Baron d'Arros, Coseigneur de Saint-Abit, Seigneur de Minvielle and de Galan d'Asson (1690–1745)
- Nephew: Isaac de Forcade de Biaix (* about 1704, Biaix Manor, Pau, Béarn, France; † 21 January 1775, Potsdam, Prussia), Royal Prussian colonel, Hofmarschall to the Prince of Prussia, His Royal Highness Crown Prince Frederick William II, heir to the throne of Prussia, recipient of the Kingdom of Prussia's highest military order of merit for heroism, Knight of the Order of Pour le Mérite (11 June 1742).

==== Third generation ====
His grandchildren included two more Knights of the Order of Pour le Mérite, one Knight of the Cross of the Royal Prussian Order of St. John Bailiwick of Brandenburg, and a First Lady-in-Waiting (French: Première Dame d'Honneur) to Her Royal Highness the Queen consort of Prussia, Elisabeth Christine of Brunswick-Wolfenbüttel-Bevern, wife of Frederick the Great.

- Grandson: Friedrich Wilhelm von Forcade de Biaix (* 23 August 1728, Berlin, Brandenburg; † 3 September 1778, Frankfurt/Oder, Brandenburg), Royal Prussian colonel, Schwadronschef (German: Rittmeister) of the 2nd Grenadier Company in the 24th Prussian Infantry Regiment, and, after 1 July 1761, acting Regimentschef of the 24th Prussian Infantry Regiment garrisoned in Frankfurt/Oder, recipient of the Kingdom of Prussia's highest military order of merit, Knight of the Order of Pour le Mérite (7 September 1774), Commandant of Frankfurt/Oder, and Presbyter of the French congregation of Frankfurt/Oder.
- Grandson: Friedrich Wilhelm Siegesmund von Aschersleben, Herr of Klockow and Parmen (* about 1737; † 19 December 1781, Berlin, Brandenburg, Prussia), Royal Prussian captain in the 18th Prussian Infantry Regiment, Knight of the Cross of the Royal Prussian Order of St. John Bailiwick of Brandenburg, son of his daughter Philippine Sophie de Forcade de Biaix.
- Granddaughter: Charlotte Sophie Therese Marthe von Forcade de Biaix (* 25 October 1743, Berlin, Brandenburg; † 23 March 1799, Steinfurth, Hesse), First Lady-in-Waiting (French: Première Dame d'Honneur) to Her Royal Highness the Queen consort of Prussia, Elisabeth Christine of Brunswick-Wolfenbüttel-Bevern, wife of Frederick the Great, ∞ 29 September 1775 Johann Hugo Wilhelm, Freiherr Löw von und zu Steinfurth (* 25 August 1750; 23 May 1786), Royal Prussian Chamberlain and Knight of the Order of Joseph
- Grandson: Georg Friedrich Wilhelm von Forcade de Biaix (* 16 October 1746, Berlin, Brandenburg; † 31 August 1811, Wohlau, Silesia), Royal Prussian major in the 1st Hussar Regiment; ∞ before 1783 with Johanna Sophie Zippelius (* 8 June 1755; † 21 August 1804, Winzig, Silesia)
- Grandson: Friedrich Heinrich Ferdinand Leopold von Forcade de Biaix (* 19 December 1747, Berlin, Brandenburg; † 12 October 1808, Schleibitz Manor, Oels, Silesia), retired Royal Prussian lieutenant colonel, battalion commander of the 10th Füsilier Battalion under the 28th Prussian Infantry Regiment in Neumarkt, Silesia with which participated in the Rhine Campaigns of 1791, recipient of the Kingdom of Prussia's highest military order of merit, Knight of the Order of Pour le Mérite (September 1791), Castellan in Neuenrade in the County of Mark after his father's death; ∞ in 1782 at Ossen Manor, Oels, Silesia to Wilhelmine von Koshembahr und Skorkau from the house of Ossen.

==== Fourth generation ====
Among his great-grandchildren, at least three fought in the Napoleonic Wars, one was elevated in his nobility to the rank of Baron, one became the sixth Knight of the Order of Pour le Mérite in the family, another became the second Knight of the Cross of the Royal Prussian Order of St. John Bailiwick of Brandenburg, and two were awarded the Knight of the Iron Cross 2nd Class.

- Great-grandson: Friedrich Wilhelm Leopold Konstantin Quirin Freiherr von Forcade de Biaix, Herr of Schleibitz, Hamm, Groß-Naedlitz and Loslau, (* 12 May 1784, Berlin; † 22 October 1840, Breslau), Royal Prussian major, Knight of the Iron Cross 2nd Class, Knight of the Cross of the Royal Prussian Order of St. John Bailiwick of Brandenburg (1817), Royal Prussian Chamberlain, and Castellan of Neuenrade in the County of Mark. Elevated in his nobility to the rank of Baron.
- Great-grandson: Wilhelm Friedrich Erdmann Ferdinand von Forcade de Biaix (* 26 February 1786, Brieg, Silesia; Missing in Action, presumed † 1816), Royal Prussian lieutenant colonel in the service of the Imperial Russian Army, adjutant to Infantry General Loggin Osipovitch Roth, recipient of the Kingdom of Prussia's highest military order of merit, Knight of the Order of Pour le Mérite (26 May 1814).
- Great-grandson: Friedrich Wilhelm Ferdinand Ernst Heinrich von Forcade de Biaix (* 7 October 1787, Brieg, Silesia; † 14 November 1835, Rawitsch, Silesia), Royal Prussian major, commanding officer of the 10th Prussian Division's Garrison Company and Knight of the Iron Cross 2nd Class.

==== Fifth generation ====
- Great-great-grandson: Christoph Ernst Friedrich von Forcade de Biaix (born 17 September 1821, Büren near Paderborn; died 18 July 1891 at de:Schloss Reckenberg, in Lichtenfels, Hesse) was a German Rittergut owner, Appellate court Judge in Hamm, Supreme Court Judge in Berlin and Member of parliament in the German Reichstag.

== Titles and offices ==
Historical terms, in particular those related to offices, titles and awards, are often outdated in their usage to the point that modern dictionaries no longer contain them. To understand their meaning in the present day context it is necessary to look into dictionaries from the period. Historical terms in German used in the production of this article, and their English definitions, include:

=== Regimentschef ===
The appointment to Regimentschef, a regimental commander in the Prussian Army, was usually for life. For this reason, most regiments were known and referred to by the name of their Chef, the commander; for example, "Forcade's Regiment", instead of the "23rd Prussian Infantry Regiment".

== Biaix – The family manor ==
The noble manor of Biaix (see also Manorialism) in the city of Pau and another house called Biaix du faubourg located in what was the suburbs of the early 16th century city, were simultaneously ennobled on 20 September 1521, by letters patent of Henry II, King of Navarre, for Pierre de Biaix, at the time chancellor of Foix and Béarn.

Noble Jean de Forcade, Seigneur de Rontignon, purchased both properties on 28 February 1659 from Gratian von Turon, Seigneur de Beyrie, for 6,000 Bordeaux livres and was admitted on 10 June 1659 to the Order of Nobility of the States of Béarn as Seigneur de Biaix. The property was not a fief in the classical sense, because it was not a large plot of land, with all the buildings on it and the people who lived there as serfs, and as such did not required the collection of taxes, the exercise of punishment, and other related rights and obligations.

Under intimidation from the policy of harassment of religious minorities through the use of dragonnades, started in 1681, to intimidate Huguenots into converting to Catholicism or to leave France, and under the threat of confiscation of properties of nobles who did not convert, both Jean de Forcade, Seigneur de Biaix and his eldest son abjured from Protestantism, therewith maintaining possession of Biaix. Following the father's death in 1684, the property and the right to enter the Order of Nobility of the Estates of Béarn were passed to the eldest son, Isaac de Forcade de Biaix (Seigneur de Biaix 1684–1737).

In turn, following his death in 1737, the property and the right to enter the Order of Nobility of the States of Béarn were passed to his eldest son, Jean-Jacob de Forcade de Biaix, (Seigneur de Biaix 1738–?), before the noble Forcade-Biaix line in France extinguished. Although the noble line extinguished, the branches of the family continued at least well into the beginning of the 20th century, if not longer.

Following vicissitudes of fortune, the house in the outskirts of Pau, Biaix du faubourg, was acquired from the de Casaus family on 10 May 1710 by Noé Dufau, merchant furbisher, who was received in the Order of Nobility of the States of Béarn on 28 April 1717 as Seigneur de Biaix du faubourg. Noé Dufau died in 1739 and bequeathed it back to his niece and Goddaughter, Jean-Jacob de Forcade de Biaix's daughter, Marie-Jeanne de Forcade, Dame de Biaix, who later married Pierre de Casamajor.

Because Biaix was acquired in 1659, any reference to earlier generations of the Forcade family line with "de Biaix" as a part of their name, as observed in older Prussian sources, are erroroneous.

== Literature ==
- Ledebur, Leopold von (1854). Adelslexicon der preussischen Monarchie [Lexicon of Nobility of the Prussian Monarchy.] (application/PDF) (in German). Vol. 1. A – K. Berlin: Ludwig Rauh. p. 225 – via Heinrich Heine Universität Düsseldorf Universitäts- und Landesbibliotek.
