= Jean de Forcade, Seigneur de Biaix =

Jean de Forcade (before 1635, in presumably in Boeil, Béarn – 9 November 1684, in Pau, Béarn), was a Fermier des monnaies de Béarn et Navarre (Lessee of the Mints of Béarn and Navarre).

He was a descendant of the noble family of Forcade from Béarn in the Kingdom of Navarre, a Protestant nobleman, but abjured from Protestantism shortly before the end of his life, under intimidation from the policy of harassment of religious minorities through the use of dragonnades, created in 1681, to intimidate Huguenots into converting to Catholicism or to leave France, and under the threat of confiscation of properties of nobles who did not convert.

Jean de Forcade is the founder of the Forcade-Biaix family line, through his 1659 acquisition of the noble fief of Biaix in the city of Pau, and therewith the earliest bearer of the Forcade-Biaix name.

== Life and Occupation ==
The earliest known mention of Jean de Forcade is in relation to the provision of an office as Huissier at the Parliament of Navarre on 5 March 1644. Records for wages and other payments by the Chambre des Comptes show that Jean de Laforcade was still a Huissier at the Parliament of Navarre in 1657, when he received a reimbursement for the costs of his robe and bonnet for having assisted at the execution of a person condemned to death.

He is next mentioned in 1652 in relation to three mints being in position to strike new coins using mills, when the Chambre des Comptes de Pau (the Court of Finances of Pau) granted a license to mint to Pierre de Peyré, who, in turn, subcontracted the production to: Jean de Gassie, legislator at the Parliament of Navarre, who was committed to the mint in Morlaàs and Jean Verdoyé to the one in Saint-Palais. Verdoyé was also to ensure the interim succession of Richard Lamy at the mint in Pau until the arrival of Jean de Forcade.

Jean de Forcade was received into the Order of Nobility of the Estates of Béarn as Seigneur de Rontignon on 30 August 1658 The fief of Rontignon was originally a part of the Marquisate of Gassion. He was subsequently received into the Order of Nobility of the Estates of Béarn as Seigneur de Biaix on 10 June 1659.

The Chambre des Comptes de Pau renewed the license for the Coin Mint of Navarre and Béarn, for a fee of 11,100 livres on 11 July 1659. The official beneficiary of the license was Daniel d'Arripe, which was, in fact, the d.b.a. used by the three associates: Jean de Gassie, Jeans Daudichon and Jean de Forcade. In practice, it seems that only Jean de Forcade personally exploited one of three mints, namely the one in Saint-Palais. The management of the mints in Pau and Morlaàs was entrusted to Robert Fisson, acting in the quality of a subcontractor or shareholder proxy.

There were numerous problems associated with the minting of coins for Béarn and Navarre, all of which go beyond the scope of this biography. Some were conflicts with the King of France and his rulings on autonomy for the regions, others were with regard to the authorities responsible for the production of coins throughout France, and still others were legal issues related to competitors. King Louis XIV subsequently ordered the three mints closed. His Counsel issued a ruling on 17 Mar 1661, ordering the immediate closure of mints in Pau, Morlaàs and Saint-Palais, and the transport of the records of all coins minted at the three mints since the reign of Henry IV by the Attorney General of the Chambre des Comptes de Pau.

The problems, the visits of envoys, the interference of authorities from the Mint of France, and the aforementioned ruling led the three partners to justly conclude that their days were numbered and that the mints in Pau, Morlaàs and Saint-Palais were indeed doomed for closure, or at best be put to auction in Paris. Nevertheless, for political reasons, the Chambre des Comptes de Pau was not predisposed to grant the partners a termination of their lease since it would result in a loss of resources for the province. Considering these circumstances, the partners decided to address themselves to the King's Counsel to obtain the termination of their lease and financial relief. On 22 February 1663, the Counsel issued a final ruling declaring the license to Daniel d'Aripe null and void, retroactively to 30 June 1662, and relieving the partners of the payment of the annual license fee of 11,100 livres, therewith ending the venture.

Jean de Forcade was an active member of the Protestant church in Pau and also held office on the Consistory of Pau, the local Protestant Church Council and the authority of the local church.

The Consistory of Pau was composed of thirteen members, consisting of two pastors, ten elders and a dean. The pastors and the dean were permanent members. The elders were nominated and appointed for terms of four years, and rotated one-third at a time. As a result, a total of about forty persons served on the Consistory of Pau during its existence from 1 January 1668 until 31 July 1681. The list of these elders shows many of the same names that are also found in notarized acts, marriage contracts and parish registers related to Jean de Forcade and his descendants, several of which are families interrelated by marriage. These elders were: d'Angoueix, d'Argausse, two different d'Artiguelouve, d'Auture, de Balagué (Balaguer), de Batsalle, de Bruchelles, de Casaux, de Colomiès, de Day, de Duplaà, d'Espalungue, two different de Forcade, de Gassies, de Guiraudet, de Joët, de Jurque, de Lafitte, de Lalana, de Lamothe, de Lanabère, de Lapuyade, de Larriu, de Lème, de Maria, de Mirassor, de Missou, de Nays, de Païssa, de Péfaur, de Saint-Martin, de Saint-Orenx, de Somolon, de Veguier, de Vidal, de Vignau, and de Vignoles.

He is named in the minutes of the meeting of the Consistory on 7 April 1669, together with Messieurs de Olivier and de Rival, Pastors, de Vignoles, d'Espalungue, de Mirassor, de Bruchelles, de St.-Orenx, de Duplaa and de Larriu, all Elders, and de Lostau, dean. He was relieved of his responsibilities as an elder by the body of the Consistory of Pau on 5 April 1671.

== Biaix - The Family Estate ==
The etymology of the word Biaix has its roots in the Catalan language and means oblique or biais, in the sense of not expressed or done in a direct way or deviates from the expected according to the laws of probability or physics. The only family known to have carried this patronym prior to Jean de Forcade de Biaix was that of Pierre de Biaix, ambassador of the King of Navarre to Paris and to Brussels (1516), secular Parson of Monein and of Pau, secular Abbot of Lucq (abbé laïc de Lucq), elected Bishop of Aire (évèque élu d'Aire) 1523-26, Chancellor of Foix and Béarn, Chancellor of Navarre and ambassador of Navarre to Spain.

The Seigneur of the noble fief of Biaix paid a tax of 4 feus for the period ending 12 January 1549.

Noble Jean de Forcade, Seigneur de Rontignon, purchased the noble fief of Biaix in Pau on 28 February 1659 from Gratian von Turon, Seigneur de Beyrie, for 6,000 Bordeaux livres and was admitted on 10 June 1659 to the Order of Nobility of the States of Béarn as Seigneur de Biaix.

The noble fief of Biaix in the city of Pau and another house located on the outskirts of the city, were simultaneously ennobled on 20 September 1521, by letters of Henry II, King of Navarre, for Pierre de Biaix, then Chancellor of Foix and Béarn.

Although there are references to his son, also named Jean de Forcade de Biaix, as the "Marquis de Biaix", in some Prussian sources published between 1788 and 1837, there is no evidence that either father or son was ever a Marquis. The noble fief of Biaix in the city of Pau was not a "marquisate".

Under intimidation from the policy of harassment of religious minorities through the use of dragonnades, created in 1681, to intimidate Huguenots into converting to Catholicism or to leave France, and under the threat of confiscation of properties of nobles who did not convert, both Jean de Forcade de Biaix and his eldest son, Isaac de Forcade de Biaix, abjured from Protestantism, therewith maintaining possession of Biaix. Following his death in 1684, the property and the right to enter the Order of Nobility of the States of Béarn was passed to Isaac de Forcade de Biaix (Seigneur de Biaix 1684-1737).

In turn, following his death in 1737, the property and the right to enter the Order of Nobility of the States of Béarn was passed to his eldest son, Jean-Jacob de Forcade de Biaix, Seigneur de Biaix (1738-?), before the Forcade-Biaix line in France is thought to have extinguished.

After various viscitudes of fortune, the second smaller house on the outskirts of Pau, referred to as Biaix du faubourg, in the suburb of la Fontaine, acquired with the main fief on 28 February 1659, was acquired from family de Casaus on 10 May 1710 by Noé Dufau, merchant furbisher, who was received in the Order of Nobility of the States of Béarn on 28 April 1717 as Seigneur de Biaix du faubourg. Noé Dufau died in 1739 and bequeathed it back to his niece and Goddaughter, Jean-Jacob de Forcade de Biaix' daughter, Marie-Jeanne de Forcade, Dame de Biaix, who later married Pierre de Casamajor. This property had a value of 20 livres in the 23 December 1693 estimation of house values by the City of Pau.

Because Biaix was acquired in 1659, any reference to parents or grandparents in this family line with de Biaix as a part of the name are in error.

== Family ==
=== Parents ===
Jean de Forcade was the son of Isacq de Forcade (* Before 1601), from Boeil, and Marie de Bordes, from Nay, who married by notarized contract at the Notary Nicolas de Lavie in Nay on 26 March 1624.

Isacq de Forcade, in turn, was the son of Pierre de Forcade, Lawyer, Guardian of Mint of Pau (Garde en la monnaie de Pau) and his wife Marie de Maserolles. Marie de Bordes was the daughter of Pierre de Bordes, Lawyer and Special Prosecutor for the District of Nay, and his wife, Marie de Foron.

There is no document that names the parents of Jean de Forcade, Seigneur de Biaix. There is no birth or baptism record. His parents are not named in his marriage record at the Protestant Temple in Morlaàs on 23 December 1659, nor are they named in his marriage contract made at the Notary Jean d'Agoeuix in Pau on 12 February 1660. The evidence linking him as the son of Isacq de Forcade is nonetheless strong, if not conclusive.

Jean de Forcade, Seigneur de Biaix, assisted at the marriage by notarized contract at the Notary Jean d'Agoeuix in Pau, between Pierre de Bordes, Seigneur de Rontignon, and Damoiselle Marie de Belça on 11 December 1661. In this contract, he is confirmed to be a cousin of Pierre de Bordes.

...11 December 1661: Marriage contract between Noble
Pierre de Bordes, Seigneur de Rontignon, and
Damoiselle Marie de Belça, daughter of the late Mr.
Pierre de Belca, attorney, Counsellor and dean in
the court of the Parliament of Navarre, who made
out his will on 29 June 1654, and made a codicil
on 10 May 1660. The Seigneur de Bordes was
assisted by: Messire Jean Marquis de Gassion
counsellor to the King on both his state and
private councils, and President of the Court of the
Parliament of Navarre, Noble Arnaud de Bordes,
Seigneur de la Salle, his brother, Noble Jean de
Forcade, Seigneur de Biaix, Noble Henry d'Arrosès,
Seigneur d'Idernes, his cousins. Demoiselle de
Belça was assisted by: Noble Pierre de Belça, a
lawyer at the Court [of the Parliament of Navarre],
and Jean-Louis of Belça, her brothers, Damoiselle
Claude de Belça, her sister, Messire Bernard de
Saint-Martin, Viscount d'Echaux. ...

=== Marriage and Children ===
Jean de Forcade married 23 December 1659 at the Protestant Temple in Morlaàs with Madeleine de Lanne († aft. 1701), daughter of Ramon de Lanne, bourgeois in Pau. The couple had at least 14 children together. Among them, Isaac (1660), Sophie Philippine (1661–1730), Jean who follows (1663), Marie (1662–1732),) Magdelaine (1668), Abraham (1670), Armand (1671), Marthe (1673–1731)), Pierre (1673), Marthe (1676), Paul (1677–1705), Henri (1678), Jacques (1681) and Anne (1682).

- Jean de Forcade de Biaix, (* 14 December 1663, Pau in Béarn; † 2 February 1729, Berlin) who left Béarn and became a Royal Prussian Lieutenant General. He was the Regimentschef of the 23rd Prussian Infantry Regiment (1716–29), Commandant of the Royal Residence in Berlin (1722–29) during the reign of King Frederick William I of Prussia, Gouverneur militaire de Berlin (1713–29) and a Knight of the Order of the Black Eagle. He married the Baroness Juliane von Honstedt, from the noble house of Erdeborn, on 15 April 1697. She was the daughter of Major General Quirin, Erbherr (Allod) von Honstedt, Herr of Sulzau, Weikenburg and Erdeborn, and his wife Maria Magdalena Streiff von Löwenstein, of Falkenau, Diedenhosten and Bacour.

=== Other family ===
- Nicolas de La Forcade, Lawyer, merchant from Bielle, Canton of Laruns, in the Ossau Valley married by notarized contract with Suzanne du Plàa on 25 July 1657. He was assisted by Messieurs Daniel, Ruben, Martin and Pierre de La Forcade, his brothers, by Damoiselle Marie d'Arripes, his mother, David and Daniel d'Arripe, his first cousins, and Pierre du Pont, his brother-in-law. Nicolas de La Forcade, Lawyer, Bourgeois and merchant in Pau married in a second marriage with Marie de Vignau, from Bizanos, daughter of Noble Samson de Vignau and of Marguerite du Pac. Pierre de Laforcade, Notary at the Seneschalty of Oloron, and David d'Arripe were present at the writing of the testament of Henry de Lacroix, a painter from Paris, resident in Oloron for forty years, on 12 July 1663. Nicolas de La Forcade, Lawyer and Bourgeois from Pau, assisted Camille de Vignau at her marriage by notarized contract on 14 July 1682 to Jean d'Abbadie, Lawyer, from Morlaàs, together with, among others, Suzanne and Marie de Bizanos, her full sisters.
