= Amalie Wilhelmine Henriette Ernestine Bianca von Forcade de Biaix =

Herrin von Forcade de Biaix und von Randow
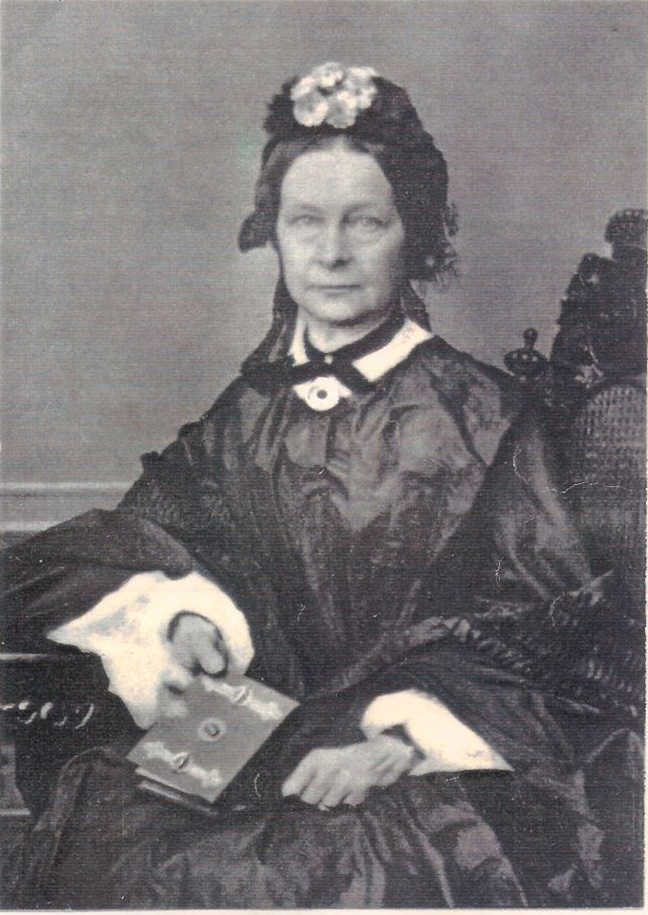
- Picture of Amalie Wilhelmine Henriette Ernestine Bianca von Forcade of Biaix in the 19th century, ancestor of the von Randow family in Brazil

Personal details
- Born: Amalie Wilhelmine Henriette Ernestine Bianca von Forcade de Biaix; 21 July 1811 Schleibitz Manor, Oels, Silesia
- Died: 16 April 1880 Lauban, Silesia
- Resting place: Lubań
- Spouse: Heinrich Sylvius Friedrich Adolf von Randow, Herr of Pangau
- Children: Arthur von Randow; Lothar von Randow; Georg Friedrich Adolf Alexander von Randow; Georg Friedrich Adolf Maximilian von Randow; Adolf von Randow; Anna von Randow; Antoinette von Randow
- Parent(s): Friedrich Wilhelm Leopold Konstantin Quirin Freiherr von Forcade de Biaix; Amalie Ernestine Wilhelmine Elisabeth von Poser und Groß-Naedlitz

Amalie Wilhelmine Henriette Ernestine Bianca von Forcade de Biaix (born 27 July 1811 at Schleibitz Manor, Oels, Silesia; died 16 April 1880, Lauban, Lauban County, Silesia) was a daughter of Captain Friedrich Wilhelm Leopold Konstantin Quirin Freiherr von Forcade de Biaix, Lord of Schleibitz, Hamm, Groß-Naedlitz and Loslau, and Amalie Ernestine Wilhelmine Elisabeth von Poser und Groß-Naedlitz. She was a descendant of the noble family of Forcade.

She married 17 January 1832 at Krakowahne Castle, Trebnitz County in Silesia with Heinrich Sylvius Friedrich Adolf von Randow, Herr of Pangau (* 25 January 1807, Oels, Silesia; † 29 September 1859, Rio de Janeiro, Brazil), Royal Prussian Captain in the Artillery and a professional engineer (railways), who emigrated in 1853 to Dona Francisca in Brazil.

Dona Francisca in Brazil seems not to have met the expectation of the family. In any case, Bianca von Forcade of Biaix together with her daughters and sons Lothar and little Adolf, at the latest in 1855, returned to Silesia. Bianca had written in 1866 and 1875 to her son Maximilian von Randow, who stayed in Brazil. Also Adolf and the three children who stayed in Brazil, Arthur, Alexander and Maximilian, left the colony Dona Francisca and went to Rio de Janeiro. The father worked there, according to the information he gave to his relatives in Germany, as an "engineer." At the Institute Hans Staden, in São Paulo, is the information that Adolf von Randow had been commissioned to make a topographic survey of a colony of emigrants.

Amalie Wilhelmine Henriette Ernestine Bianka von Forcade de Biaix and Heinrich Sylvius Friedrich Adolf von Randow were cousins, their mothers were sisters, Wilhelmine Christiane Friederike Henriette von Poser und Groß-Naedlitz and Amalie Ernestine Wilhelmine Elisabeth von Poser und Groß-Naedlitz, daughters of Johann Gottlieb Sylvius von Poser und Groß-Naedlitz, Royal Lieutenant Colonel of Prussia and Helper of Frederick the Great.

Bianca and Adolf had many children: Arthur von Randow, Lothar von Randow, Georg Friedrich Adolf Alexander von Randow, Georg Friedrich Adolf Maximilian von Randow, Adolf von Randow, Anna von Randow and Antoinette von Randow. From Alexander and Maximillian descend two Brazilian houses of von Randow with hundreds of members still today. Bianca and Heinrich Sylvius Friedrich Adolf von Randow are the common ancestors of all Family von Randow living in Brazil.

== Family ==
=== Coat of arms ===
Coat of Arms: An escutcheon with the field divided into four parts. Left half: argent tincture, a gules lion holding a sinople eradicated oak tree between its paws; azure tincture charged with three or mullets; Right half: a gules castle with three towers on an argent tincture; sinople tincture charged with three argent roses below it. A Grafenkrone (Count's coronet) as helmut on top of the escutcheon, crested with a or fleur-de-lis. Two or lions supporting the escutcheon. Motto: "In Virtute Pertinax".

Heraldic Symbolism: The lion symbolizes courage; the eradicated oak tree symbolizes strength and endurance; the towers are symbols of defense and of individual fortitude; the mullets (5-star) symbolizes divine quality bestowed by god; the rose is a symbol of hope and joy; the fleur-de-lis is the floral emblem of France; the coronet is a symbol of victory, sovereignty and empire. A Count's coronet to demonstrate rank and because the family originally served the counts of Foix and Béarn during the English Wars in the Middle Ages.

== Ancestors ==
Ancestors of A. W. H. E. Bianca von Forcade de Biaix

Sir Jean de Forcade, Marquis de Biaix
Friedrich Wilhelm Quirin von Forcade de Biaix
Freiin Juliane von Honstedt
Friedrich Heinrich Ferdinand Leopold von Forcade de Biaix
Louis de Montolieu, Baron de St.-Hippolyte
Marie de Montolieu, Baroness de St.Hippolyte
Susanne von Pélissier
Friedrich Wilhelm Leopold Konstantin Quirin Freiherr von Forcade de Biaix
Karl Wilhelm von Koschembahr
Christian Leopold von Koschembahr
Maria Anna Gottliebe von Bojanowski
Wilhelmine von Koschembahr und Skorkau
Johann Leonhard von Wutgenau
Wilhelmine von Koschembahr und Skorkau
Christine Sophie von Tarnau
Amalie Wilhelmine Henriette Ernestine Bianca von Forcade de Biaix
Christian Heinrich von Poser und Groß-Naedlitz
Gottlieb Heinrich von Poser und Groß-Naedlitz
Charlotte Johanna von Thielau
Johann Gottlieb Sylivus von Poser und Groß-Naedlitz
Georg Friedrich von Rymultowsky und Kornitz
Johanna Christiane von Rymultowsky und Kornitz
Elisabeth Margarethe von Wutgenau
Amalie Ernestine Wilhelmine Elisabeth von Poser und Groß-Naedlitz
Gustav Rudolf von Loeben
Johann Friedrich von Loeben
Ursula Marianne von Bünau
Amalie Johanna Henriette Helene von Loeben l
Günther von Bünau
Christiana Marianne von Bünau
Sophie Charlotte Eleonore von Stoessel

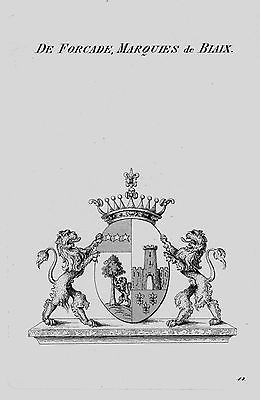
Forcade-Biaix Coat of Arms, Prussian Branch, circa 1820

The family motto of the Prussian branch is "In Virtute Pertinax".

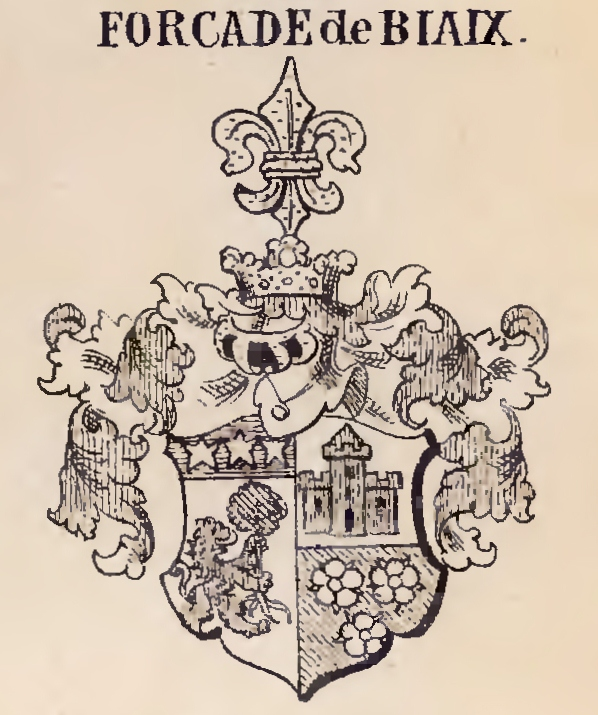
Forcade-Biaix Coat of Arms, Silesia Branch, date unknown, pre-1900
