= Friedrich Wilhelm Leopold Konstantin Quirin Freiherr von Forcade de Biaix =

Prussian army officer and noble (1784–1840)

Sir Friedrich Wilhelm Leopold Konstantin Quirin Freiherr von Forcade de Biaix
- Born: Friedrich Wilhelm Leopold Konstantin Quirin von Forcade de Biaix; 12 May 1784; Brieg, Silesia, Prussia
- Died: 22 October 1840 (aged 56); Breslau, Schlesien, Prussia
- Burial place: Evangelical Church Cemetery, Breslau, Schlesien, Prussia
- Title: Baron, Freiherr; Herr of Schleibitz, Hamm, Gross-Naedlitz and Loslau; Kammerherr; Drost in Neuenrade
- Spouse(s): Amalie Ernestine Wilhelmine Elisabeth von Poser and Gross-Naedlitz, from the house of Peuke (1804)
- Children: 5
- Parent(s): Friedrich Heinrich Ferdinand Leopold von Forcade de Biaix; Johanna Christine Wilhelmine von Koschembahr und Skorkau from the house of Ossen
- Military career
- Allegiance: Prussia
- Branch: Prussian Army
- Service years: 1797–1804, 1813–1832
- Rank: Captain
- Units: 23rd Prussian Infantry Regiment (1797–1804); 8th Silesian Landwehr Infantry Regiment (1813–1832)
- Commands: Company commander, 8th Silesian Landwehr Infantry Regiment (1813–1832)
- Conflicts: War of the Sixth Coalition; War of the Seventh Coalition
- Awards: Knight of the Order of Saint John (1817); Knight of the Iron Cross 2nd Class (1813); Campaign Medal 1813-15

Friedrich Wilhelm Leopold Konstantin Quirin Freiherr von Forcade de Biaix, aka Friedrich Wilhelm Leopold Konstantin Quirin von Forcade de Biaix, Herr of Schleibitz, Hamm, Groß-Naedlitz and Loslau, aka the Baron von Forcade, ( 12 May 1784 – 22 October 1840), Royal Prussian Major, Knight of the Iron Cross 2nd Class on 26 August 1813, knighted by His Majesty Frederick William III of Prussia as Knight of the Order of Saint John (Bailiwick of Brandenburg) (Balley Brandenburg des Ritterlichen Ordens Sankt Johannis vom Spital zu Jerusalem) in 1817, Royal Prussian Chamberlain (Kammerherr) and Castellan (Drost) of Neuenrade in the County of Mark, after his father's death in 1808. He was also a publisher, author, and theater director.

== Military career ==
The Red House in Strehlen near Dresden, 26 August 1813, during the Battle of Dresden

Born in Brieg, Silesia, he followed the military tradition of his family, and:

- 1797, entered Prussian military service in the 23rd Prussian Infantry Regiment.
- 1804, discharged from Prussian military service.
- 1804, his Majesty Frederick William III of Prussia awarded him office of Royal Chamberlain (German: Königlicher Kammerherr).
- 1806, Standesherr in Loslau
- 1808, inherited the office of Castellan (German: Drost) of Neuenrade in the County of Mark upon his father's death.
- 1813, responded to the general call-up and mobilization of military reservists and Landwehr, and reentered Prussian military service.
- 1813, helped organize and train six Companies of Landwehr.
- 26 August 1813, recognized for his heroic actions defending the so-called Red House at Strehlen near Dresden against a vastly superior enemy during the Battle of Dresden.
- 1813–1815, participated in the Campaigns of 1813-1815 during the War of the Sixth Coalition as a captain and company commander of the 8th Silesian Landwehr Infantry Regiment.
- 1817, his Majesty Frederick William III of Prussia awarded him Knight of the Order of Saint John (Bailiwick of Brandenburg) (German: Balley Brandenburg des Ritterlichen Ordens Sankt Johannis vom Spital zu Jerusalem).
- Captain in the Gendarmerie in Breslau
- 1825, awarded the Knight of the Iron Cross 2nd Class for his heroic actions defending the so-called Red House against a vastly superior enemy during the Battle of Dresden on 26 August 1813.
- 1832, took his retirement.
- 1840, died in Breslau, Silesia

== Family ==
=== Coat of arms ===
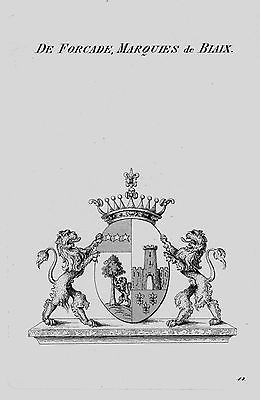
Forcade-Biaix coat of arms, Prussian branch, circa 1820

The family motto of the Prussian branch is "In Virtute Pertinax".

Coat of arms: An escutcheon with the field divided into four parts. Left half: argent tincture, a gules lion holding a sinople eradicated oak tree between its paws; azure tincture charged with three or mullets; Right half: a gules castle with three towers on an argent tincture; sinople tincture charged with three argent roses below it. A Grafenkrone (count's coronet) as helmut on top of the escutcheon, crested with a or fleur-de-lis. Two or lions supporting the escutcheon. Motto: "In Virtute Pertinax".

Heraldic symbolism: The lion symbolizes courage; the eradicated oak tree symbolizes strength and endurance; the towers are symbols of defense and of individual fortitude; the mullets (5-star) symbolizes divine quality bestowed by god; the rose is a symbol of hope and joy; the fleur-de-lis is the floral emblem of France; the coronet is a symbol of victory, sovereignty and empire. A count's coronet to demonstrate rank and because the family originally served the counts of Foix and Béarn during the English Wars in the Middle Ages.

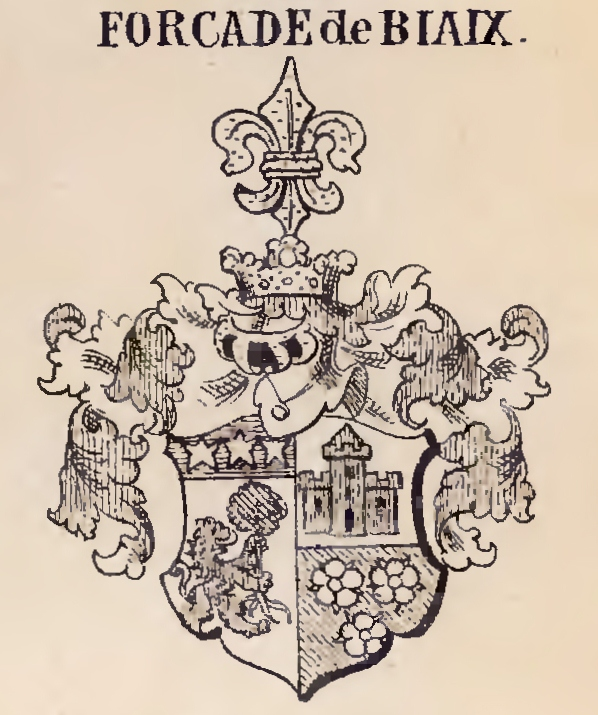
Forcade-Biaix coat of arms, Silesia branch, date unknown, pre-1900

=== Parents ===
His father was Friedrich Heinrich Ferdinand Leopold von Forcade de Biaix (1747-1808), a Royal Prussian Lieutenant Colonel, recipient of Kingdom of Prussia's highest military order of merit for heroism, Knight of the Order of Pour le Mérite and Castellan (Drost) of Neuenrade in the County of Mark.

He married in 1782 at Ossen Manor in Oels, Silesia, to Wilhelmine von Koshembahr und Skorkau (1762-????), from the house of Ossen. She was the daughter of Christian Leopold von Koschembahr und Skorkau, Herr of Ober- and Nieder-Ossen, Pühlau, Dörndorf and Jacobsdorf, and his 2nd wife Charlotte Wilhelmine Wutge von Wutgenau.

=== Marriage ===
Friedrich Wilhelm Leopold Konstantin Quirin von Forcade de Biaix married at the Rittergut Peuke in Oels county on 26 November 1804 with Amalie Ernestine Wilhelmine Elisabeth von Poser und Gross-Naedlitz, from the house of Peuke (* 25 November 1785, Rittergut Peuke, Oels; † 11 September 1818, Waldenburg near Breslau), the daughter of Johann Gottlieb Sylvius von Poser und Groß-Naedlitz, Herr of Perschau and Domsel (1739-1817), a Royal Prussian lieutenant colonel and aide-de-camp (German: Flügeladjutant) to Frederick William III of Prussia, and his 4th wife, Amalie Johanna Henriette Helene von Loeben (1762-1823).

=== Children ===
The couple had had at least five daughters, but by the time his wife died in 1818, only one daughter was still alive. The family line extinguished in 1840 without a son to carry it on.

- Adelheid von Forcade de Biaix (* 23 October 1805 at Schleibitz Manor, Oels; † 4 July 1808, Schleibitz Manor, Oels)
- Emilie von Forcade de Biaix (* 13 October 1806 at Schleibitz Manor, Oels; † 23 July 1808, Groß-Nädlitz near Breslau, Lower Silesia)
- Johanne von Forcade de Biaix (* 29 December 1807 at Groß-Nädlitz near Breslau, Lower Silesia; † 10 June 1810, Schleibitz Manor)
- Amalie Wilhelmine Henriette Ernestine Bianca von Forcade de Biaix (* 27 July 1811 at Schleibitz Manor, Oels, Silesia; † 16 April 1880, Lauban, Silesia). She married 17 January 1832 at Krakowahne Castle, Trebnitz County in Silesia with Heinrich Sylvius Friedrich Adolf von Randow, Herr of Pangau (* 25 January 1807, Oels, Silesia; † 29 September 1859, Rio de Janeiro, Brazil), Royal Prussian Captain in the Artillery and a professional engineer (railways), who emigrated in 1853 to Brazil.
- an unnamed daughter (* 13 March 1818, Klein Ullersdorf), who died an infant.

=== Other family ===
- Brother: Wilhelm Friedrich Erdmann Ferdinand von Forcade de Biaix (1786–1816), Imperial Russian Army lieutenant, adjutant to Imperial Russian Army Infantry General Loggin Ossipovitch Rot ("von Roth"), recipient of the Kingdom of Prussia's highest military order of merit, Knight of the Order of Pour le Mérite (26.5.1814). He was reported as Missing in Action and presumed dead in 1816.
- Brother: Friedrich Wilhelm Ferdinand Ernst Heinrich von Forcade de Biaix aka Ferdinand Heinrich von Forcade de Biaix (1787-1835), Royal Prussian major, commanding officer of the 10th Prussian Division's Garrison Company and Knight of the Iron Cross 2nd Class.

== Titles and offices ==
Historical terms, in particular those related to offices, titles and awards, are often outdated in their usage to the point that modern dictionaries no longer contain them. To understand their meaning in the present day context it is necessary to look into dictionaries from the period. Historical terms in German used in the production of this article, and their English definitions, include:

=== Drost zu Neuenrade ===
Castellan of Neuenrade

- Drost (der): synonym with "Landdrost", "Landshauptmann" and "Landsvogt"; a Lord Seneschal, a governor of a certain part of a country, an Upper Bailiff, a Castellan See: Ebers, Johann, The New And Complete Dictionary Of The German And English Languages: composed chiefly after the German Dictionaries of Mr. Adelung and of Mr. Schwan / 1: ... Containing the Letters A - G of the German Alphabet explained in English, Leipzig 1796, Page 618 (in German and English)

=== Kammerherr ===
Chamberlain

- Kammerherr (der): a Chamberlain; see also Kammerer See: Ebers, Johann, The New and Complete Dictionary of the German and English Languages: composed chiefly after the German Dictionaries of Mr. Adelung and of Mr. Schwan / 2: ... Containing the Letters H–R of the German Alphabet explained in English, Leipzig 1796, p. 284 (in German and English)
