= Christoph Ernst Friedrich von Forcade de Biaix =

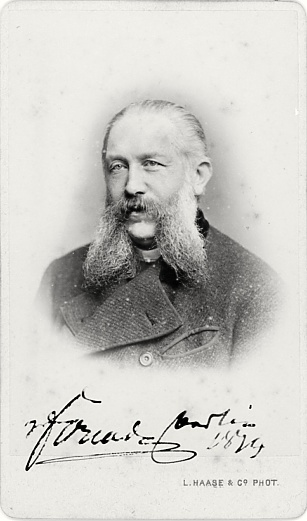
Christoph Ernst Friedrich von Forcade de Biaix (1821–1891). Photograph by Leopold Haase & Company, Berlin, circa 1874

Christoph Ernst Friedrich von Forcade de Biaix (* 17 September 1821, Büren near Paderborn; † 18 July 1891 at Reckenberg Castle, in Lichtenfels, Hesse) was a German Rittergut owner, Appellate Court Judge in Hamm, Supreme Court Judge in Berlin and Member of parliament in the German Reichstag.

He was the great-grandson of Royal Prussian Lieutenant General Friedrich Wilhelm Quirin von Forcade de Biaix (1698–1765), one of King Frederick the Great's most active and most treasured officers, himself the son of Prussian noble Jean de Forcade de Biaix (1663–1729), also a Royal Prussian Lieutenant General, an early Huguenot immigrant to Brandenburg-Prussia and a descendant of the noble family of Forcade of Béarn, France.

== Family ==
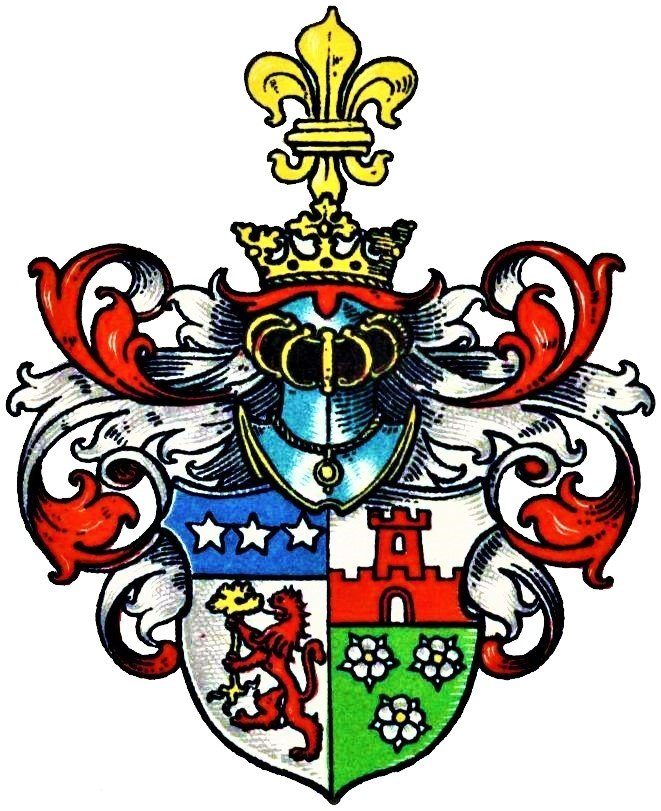
Forcade-Biaix Coat of Arms, Westphalia Branch, date unknown, pre-1900

Christoph Ernst Friedrich von Forcade de Biaix was the son of Rittmeister Friederich Georg Leopold von Forcade de Biaix (* 9 January 1793 in Winzig, Breslau; † 21 June 1831 in Münster, North Rhine-Westphalia) and his wife Anna Maria, Freiin von Krane zu Matena (* 3 May 1798 in Münster, North Rhine-Westphalia; † 26 October 1884 in Soest, North Rhine-Westphalia).

He was born Protestant but converted to Catholicism on 21 June 1861.

Forcade-Biaix was married in de:Schloss Brünninghausen, in Brünninghausen, near Dortmund in North Rhine-Westphalia on 25 September 1860, with Isabella Maria Aloysia Franziska Ferdinandine Wallpurgis Huberta Felicitas, Freiin von Romberg, daughter of Klemens Konrad Franz, Freiherr von Romberg, on Brünninghausen and Buldern and Marianne, Gräfin von Fürstenberg, from the house of Neheim. Their marriage produced at least three sons and two daughters:

- Clemens Anna Maria Friedrich Quirin Augustin von Forcade de Biaix (* 29 March 1862, Bochum, North Rhine-Westphalia), who married Anna Jenny Noack (* 2 August 1873, Senftenberg, Oberspreewald-Lausitz, Brandenburg) on 24 August 1907 in Berlin.
- Maria Anna von Forcade de Biaix (* 1 April 1863, Bochum, North Rhine-Westphalia)
- Maria Giesbert Carl Friedrich Quirin von Forcade de Biaix (* 15 April 1864, Bochum, North Rhine-Westphalia)
- Paulus Hermann von Forcade de Biaix (* 2 August 1865, Bochum, North Rhine-Westphalia)
- Anna Maria Josepha Isabella Benedicta von Forcade de Biaix (* 2 March 1868, Hamm, North Rhine-Westphalia; † 9 January 1941, Winnipeg, Manitoba, Canada), married 1887 with Baron Clemens von Romberg (1863-1923), divorced 1904.

== Career ==
Forcade-Biaix completed his secondary education at the Gymnasium in Soest and studied Case Law at the universities of Bonn, Göttingen and Berlin. He began a career in law in 1844 and became Judge in the District Court of Bochum in 1855, Appellate Court Judge in Hamm in 1865 and Supreme Court Judge in Berlin in 1873.

From 1874 to 1877 he was a member of the German Reichstag for the Centre and the constituency of the government district of Düsseldorf 5 (Essen). On 24 November 1877, he advanced through the by-election in the constituency of government district of Trier 1 (Daun, Prüm, Bitburg), winning the seat that had been held by Member of Parliament Ferdinand von Hompesch-Bollheim. In July 1878, he was reelected to the same seat. On 1 October 1879, he was appointed to the V. Zivilsenat des Reichsgerichts, a division of the Supreme Court responsible for decisions on matters related to civil property law, where he remained a member until his retirement in 1890. He resigned his appointment as a Judge on the Supreme Court on 14 October 1879.
