= De Forcade family =

French nobility

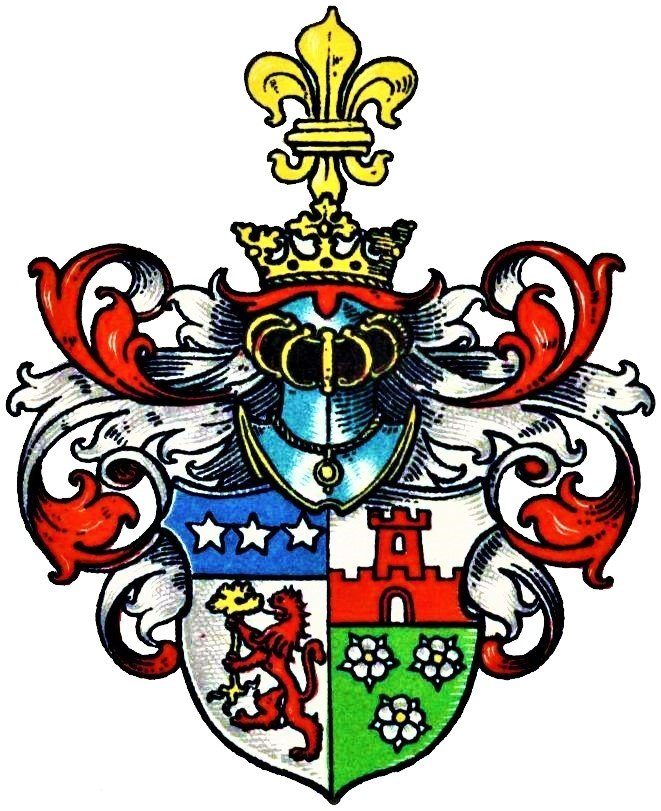
Coat of arms of the Forcade-Biaix family

The de Forcade family, sometimes written Forcade (de la), Fourcade (de) and Fourcade (de la), belongs to the nobility of Guyenne, France.

== History ==
The house of de Forcade and de la Forcade, from the town of Orthez, in Béarn, is one of the oldest families of the province, with one of its members in the 12th century, figuring among those Lords of Béarn possessing fiefs and giving tithes to the church in Orthez. It always held rank at the Order of Nobility of the States of Béarn, as evidenced in a judgment by the Court of Aids of Guyenne. They served as the Counts of Foix and Béarn during the English Wars; participated during the 14th, 15th and 16th centuries, in the oversight of proofs and reviews of nobility; and later continued into the 19th century providing France with governors of jurisdictions and distinguished military officers, many of whom were killed on the battlefield in the service of their country.

The family's nobility was reconfirmed through numerous judgments by the stewards responsible for the royal administration of Béarn ("les intendents"), by judgments of the Court of Aids (the Court of Appeals) of Guyenne and the Conseil d'Etat (France).

The Seigneur de Forcade, Seigneur de Baylens and Seigneur de Cando were three Béarnais Lords, who, circa 1170, gave the tithes of the parish of Castetarbe, in Orthez, to Guillaume-Bertrand, Bishop of Dax, son of Bertrand, Viscount de Labour and brother of Viscounts Pierre and Arnaud.

== Members ==
- Christoph Ernst Friedrich von Forcade de Biaix (1821-1891). Prussian politician
- Friedrich Wilhelm von Forcade de Biaix (1728-1778), Kingdom of Prussia Colonel
- Friedrich Heinrich Ferdinand Leopold von Forcade de Biaix (1747-1808), Royal Prussian Major
- Ferdinand Heinrich von Forcade de Biaix (1787-1835), Royal Prussian Major, Commandant of the 10th Prussian Division's Garrison Company, Knight of the Iron Cross 2nd Class
- Friedrich Wilhelm Quirin von Forcade de Biaix (1698-1765), Prussian Lieutenant General, Regimentschef of the 23rd Prussian Infantry Regiment, recipient of Prussia's highest military order of merit, the Pour le Mérite, Knight of the Order of the Black Eagle, Domherr von Havelberg, Drost zu Neuenrade in the County of Mark, Amtshauptmann von Zinna and Lieutenant Governor of Breslau
- Friedrich Wilhelm Leopold Konstantin Quirin von Forcade de Biaix (1784-1840), Royal Prussian Chamberlain, retired Royal Prussian Captain, Knight of the Cross of the Royal Prussian Order of Saint John Bailiwick of Brandenburg (der alte Balley Brandenburg des Ritterlichen Ordens Sankt Johannis vom Spital zu Jerusalem), and Knight of the Iron Cross 2nd Class for his heroic actions on 26 August 1813 defending the so-called red house near Dresden against a vastly superior enemy, Drost zu Neuenrade in the County of Mark
- Isaac von Forcade de Biaix a.k.a. Peter Isaak von Forcade de Biaix (1702–1775), Prussian Major General, Hofmarschall to the Princes of Prussia
- Jean de Forcade, Seigneur de Biaix (ca. 1624–1684), Fermier des monnaies de Béarn et Navarre
- Jean de Forcade de Biaix aka Johann von Forcade de Biaix (1663-1729), Royal Prussian Lieutenant General, Regimentschef of the 23rd Prussian Infantry Regiment, Commandant of the Royal Residence in Berlin during the reign of King Frederick William I of Prussia, Gouverneur militaire de Berlin and Knight of the Order of the Black Eagle
