= Barzkowice =

- Village
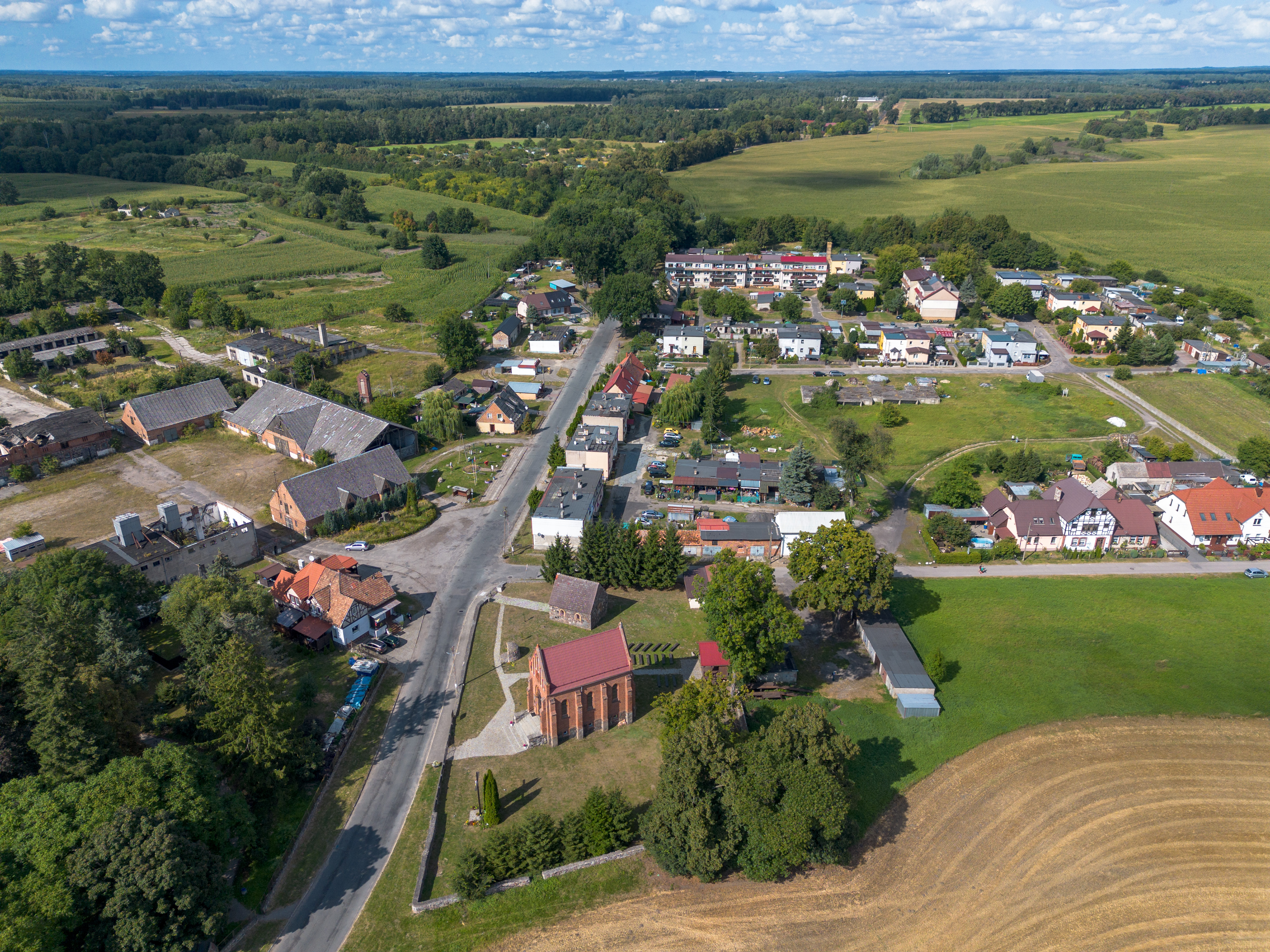
- Aerial view of the village

- Location within Poland
- Coordinates: 53°20′N 15°16′E
- Country: Poland
- Voivodeship: West Pomeranian
- County: Stargard
- Gmina: Stargard

Population
  - Total: 585

Barzkowice [baʂkɔˈvit͡sɛ] (German: Barskewitz) is a village in the administrative district of Gmina Stargard, within Stargard County, West Pomeranian Voivodeship, in north-western Poland. It lies approximately 16 km (10 mi) east of Stargard and 47 km (29 mi) east of the regional capital Szczecin.

For the history of the region, see History of Pomerania.

The village has a population of 134 people.
