= Śliwice, Opole Voivodeship =

Śliwice
- Neighbourhood
- Location within Poland
- Coordinates: 50°26′52″N 17°9′59″E
- Country: Poland
- Voivodeship: Opole
- County: Nysa
- Gmina: Otmuchów
- Town: Otmuchów
- First mentioned: c. 1300
- Within town limits: 2018
- Elevation: 200 m (660 ft)

Population
  - Total: 310
- Time zone: UTC+1 (CET)
  - Summer (DST): UTC+2 (CEST)
- Vehicle registration: ONY

Śliwice [ɕliˈvit͡sɛ] (German: Schleibitz) is a neighbourhood of Otmuchów, Poland, located in the southern part of the town.

== History ==
22 Polish citizens were murdered by Nazi Germany in the village during World War II.

Previously a village within Gmina Otmuchów, it was included within the town limits of Otmuchów in 2018.
