= Golina, Stargard County =

Golina
- Village
- Location within Poland
- Coordinates: 53°20′18″N 15°14′43″E
- Country: Poland
- Voivodeship: West Pomeranian
- County: Stargard
- Gmina: Stargard
- Population: 114

Golina [ɡɔˈlina] (German: Gollin) is a village in the administrative district of Gmina Stargard, within Stargard County, West Pomeranian Voivodeship, in north-western Poland.

The village has a population of 114.

== See also ==
History of Pomerania
