= Captain of the guard =

Military rank

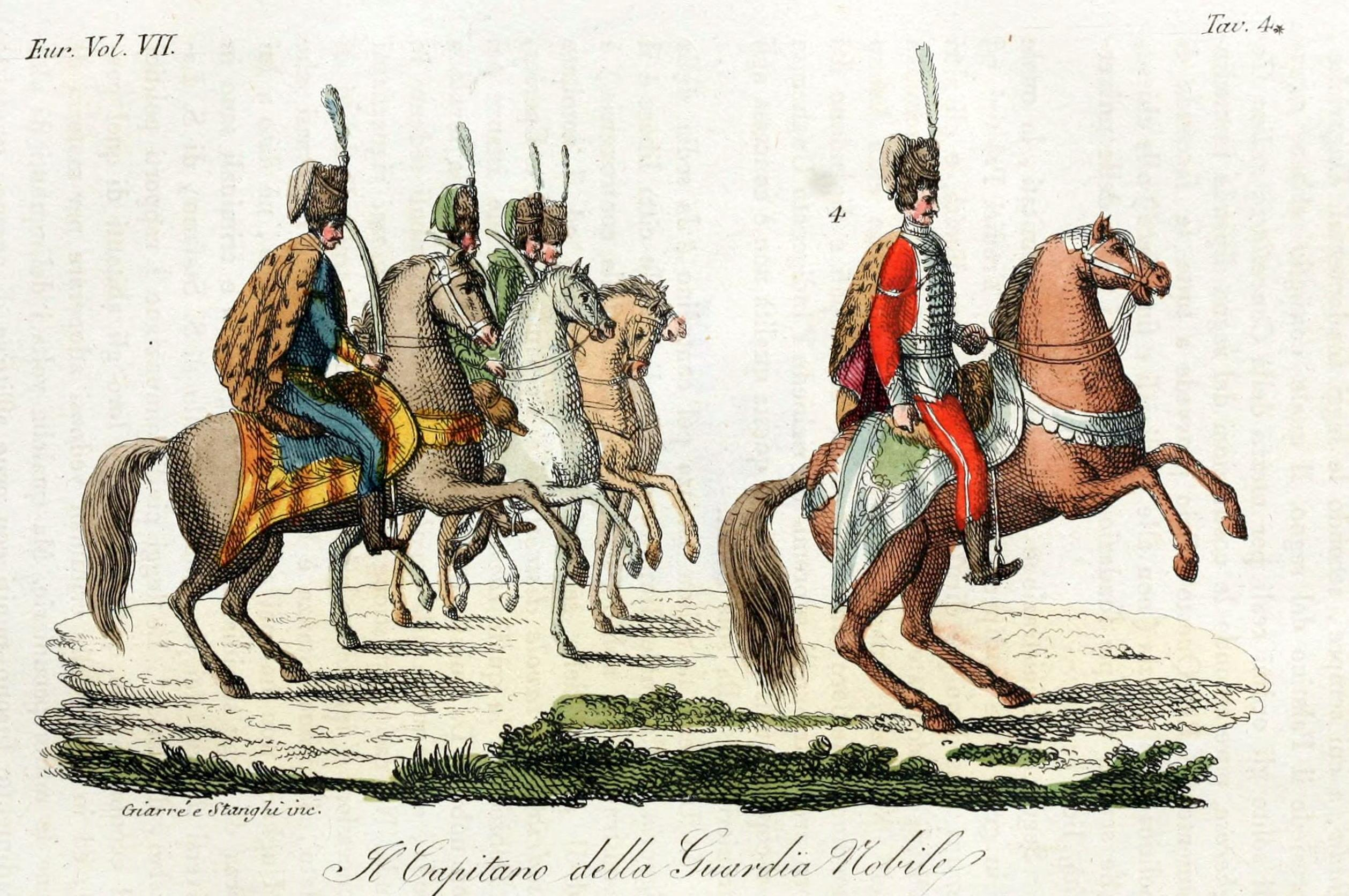
The Captain of the Noble Guard

The Captain of the Guard is a position for a military force. It is also a position within jail and prison staffing.

== Uses ==
=== Military use ===
A Captain of the Guard is the commanding position of a military security force. The position of Captain of the Guard is no longer associated with the rank of Captain. The Guard is commonly associated with bodyguard duty for royalty like the royal guards or head of state, but the Guard can refer to the military security force of a city or region such as a province, state, or territory.

=== Jail and prison use ===
A captain of the guard is the leading guard for correctional institutes, such as jails and prisons, in some jurisdictions.

=== Jewish temple guard ===
The captain of the guard oversaw a guard over the temple in Jerusalem, which consisted of three priests and 21 levites. The position is referred to in the New Testament at Acts 4:1.
