= Rontignon =

- Commune
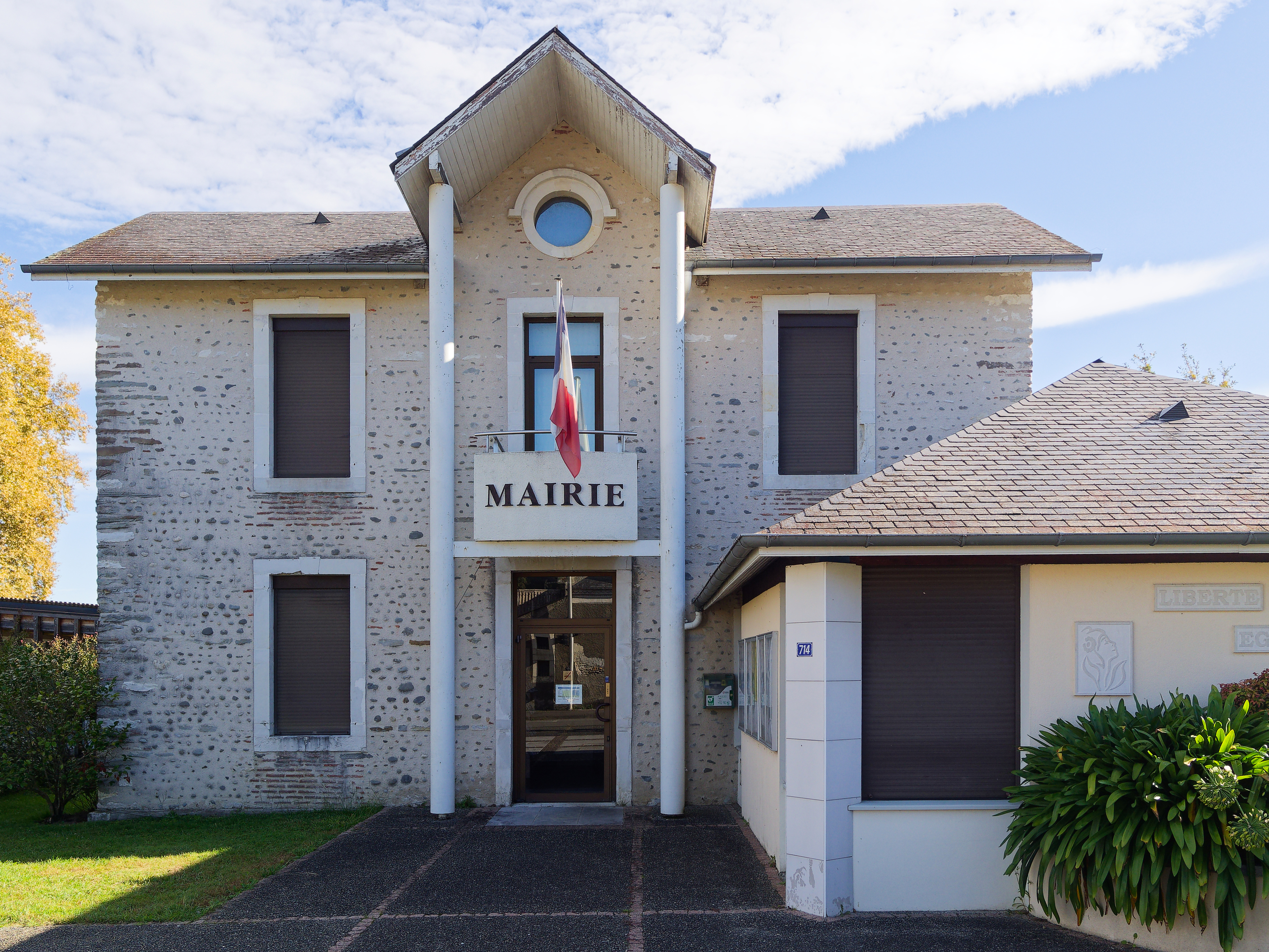
- Rontignon Town hall
- Location of Rontignon
- Location within France Location within Nouvelle-Aquitaine
- Coordinates: 43°15′43″N 0°19′41″W
- Country: France
- Region: Nouvelle-Aquitaine
- Department: Pyrénées-Atlantiques
- Arrondissement: Pau
- Canton: Ouzom, Gave et Rives du Neez
- Intercommunality: CA Pau Béarn Pyrénées

Government
  - Mayor (2020–2026): Victor Dudret
- Area^{1}: 7.06 km^{2} (2.73 sq mi)
- Elevation: 192 m (630 ft)
- Highest elevation: 384 m (1,260 ft)
- Lowest elevation: 189 m (620 ft)
- Population (2023): 875
  - Density: 124/km^{2} (321/sq mi)
- Time zone: UTC+01:00 (CET)
  - Summer (DST): UTC+02:00 (CEST)
- INSEE/Postal code: 64467 /64110
- ^{1} French Land Register data, which excludes lakes, ponds, glaciers > 1 km^{2} (0.386 sq mi or 247 acres) and river estuaries.

Rontignon (French pronunciation: [ʁɔ̃tiɲɔ̃]; Occitan: Hrontinhon) is a commune in the Pyrénées-Atlantiques department in south-western France.

== See also ==
- Communes of the Pyrénées-Atlantiques department
