= Morlaàs =

- Commune
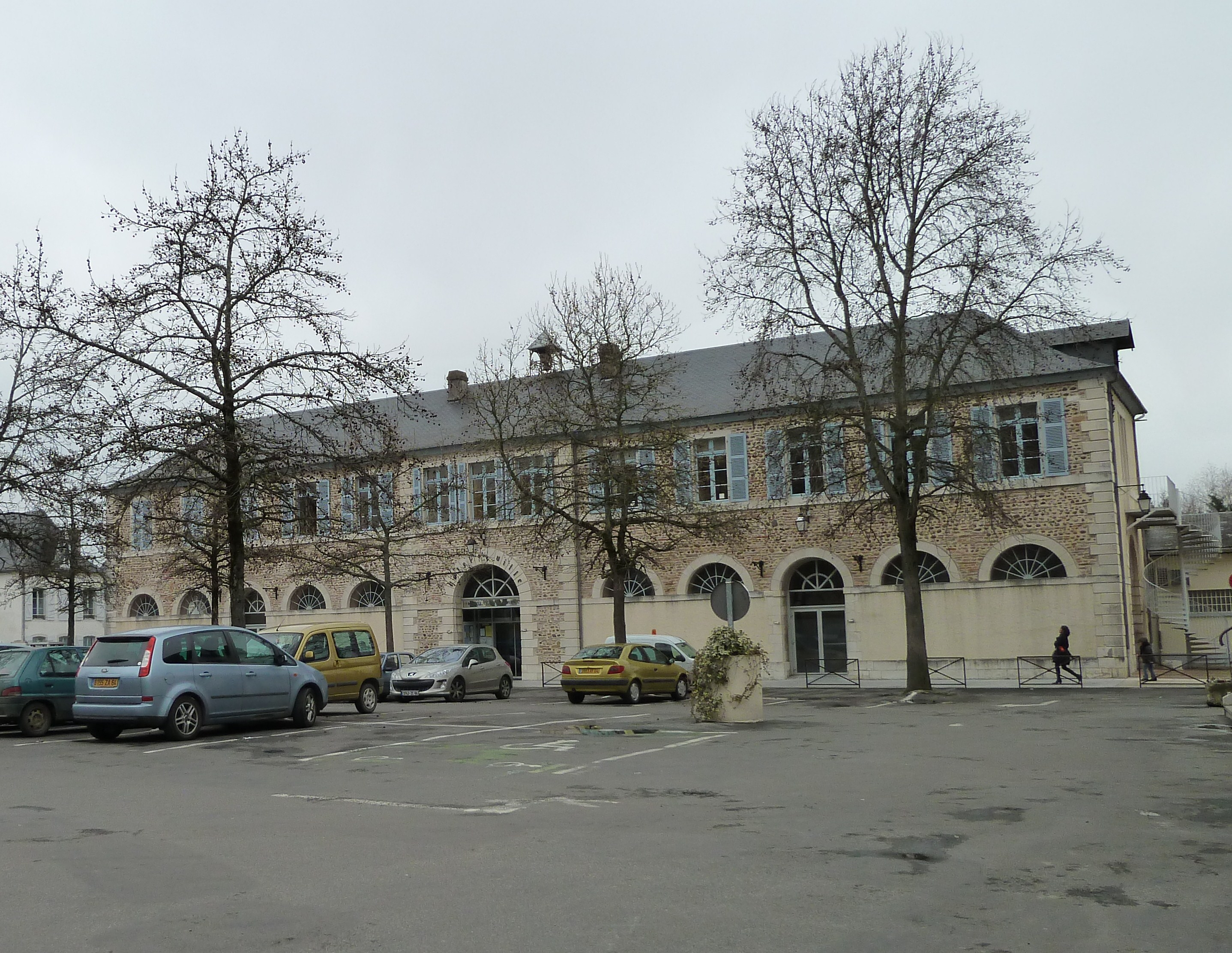
- Morlaàs city hall

- Coat of arms
- Location of Morlaàs
- Location within France Location within Nouvelle-Aquitaine
- Coordinates: 43°20′43″N 0°15′40″W
- Country: France
- Region: Nouvelle-Aquitaine
- Department: Pyrénées-Atlantiques
- Arrondissement: Pau
- Canton: Pays de Morlaàs et du Montanérès
- Intercommunality: Nord-Est Béarn

Government
  - Mayor (2020–2026): Joël Ségot
- Area^{1}: 13.15 km^{2} (5.08 sq mi)
- Elevation: 295 m (968 ft)
- Highest elevation: 349 m (1,145 ft)
- Lowest elevation: 233 m (764 ft)
- Population (2023): 4,374
  - Density: 332.6/km^{2} (861.5/sq mi)
- Time zone: UTC+01:00 (CET)
  - Summer (DST): UTC+02:00 (CEST)
- INSEE/Postal code: 64405 /64160
- ^{1} French Land Register data, which excludes lakes, ponds, glaciers > 1 km^{2} (0.386 sq mi or 247 acres) and river estuaries.

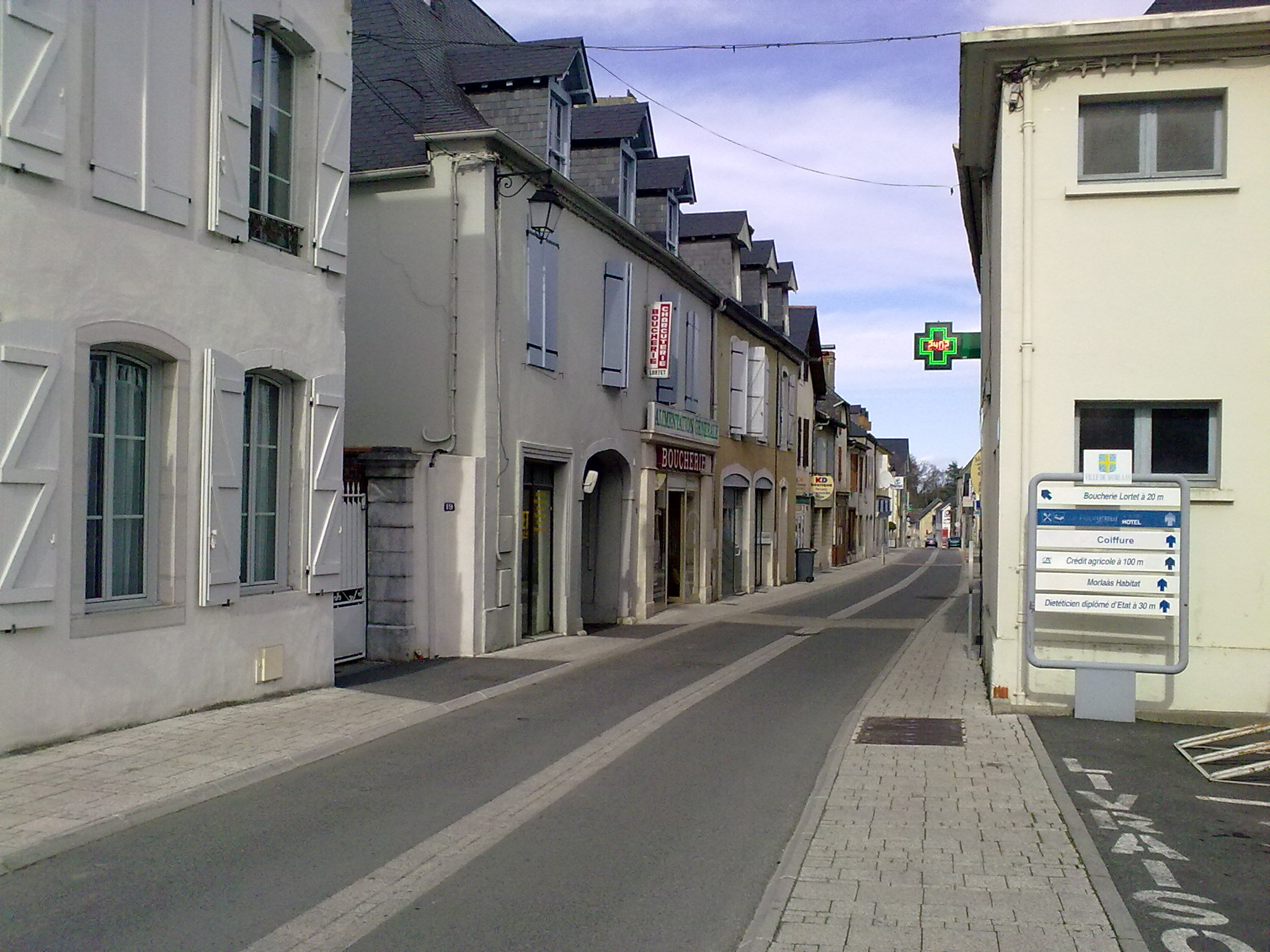
Main Street Morlaàs.

Morlaàs (French pronunciation: [mɔʁlas]; Gascon: Morlans) is a commune in the Pyrénées-Atlantiques department in south-western France.

It is the seat of a canton.

After the Roman city of Benearnum (today's Lescar) was razed by the Vikings in 841, Morlaàs became the capital of the ancient province of Béarn. It remained the capital until the 12th century, when Orthez took over.

== Population ==
Historical population
Year	Pop.	±% p.a.
1968	1,478	—
1975	1,913	+3.75%
1982	2,411	+3.36%
1990	3,094	+3.17%
1999	3,658	+1.88%
2007	4,204	+1.75%
2012	4,168	−0.17%
2017	4,282	+0.54%
2023	4,374	+0.35%
Source: INSEE

== See also ==
- Communes of the Pyrénées-Atlantiques department
