= Austro-Hungarian Compromise of 1867 =

Establishment of Austria-Hungary

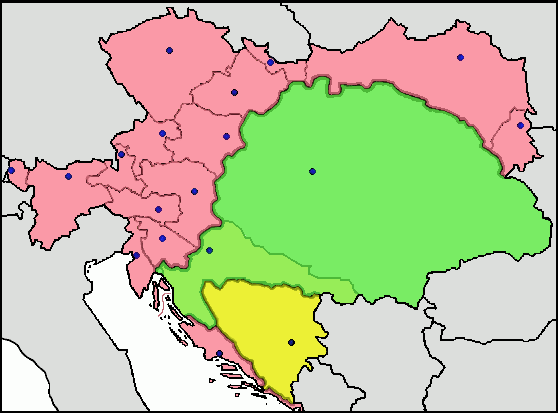
The division between lands to be administered from Vienna (deep pink) and lands to be administered from Budapest (green) under the 1867 dual monarchy Ausgleich agreement. From 1878, Bosnia-Herzegovina (yellow) was jointly administered.

The Austro-Hungarian Compromise of 1867 (German: Ausgleich, Hungarian: kiegyezés) established the dual monarchy of Austria-Hungary, which was a military and diplomatic alliance of the two sovereign states. The Compromise only partially re-established the former pre-1848 sovereignty and status of the Kingdom of Hungary, being separate from, and no longer subject to, the Austrian Empire. The Compromise put an end to the 18-year-long military dictatorship and absolutist rule over Hungary which Emperor Franz Joseph I of Austria had instituted after the Hungarian Revolution of 1848. The territorial integrity of the Kingdom of Hungary was restored. The agreement also restored the old historic constitution of the Kingdom of Hungary.

Hungarian political leaders had two main goals during the negotiations. One was to regain the traditional status (both legal and political) of the Hungarian state, which had been lost after the 1848 Revolution. The other was to restore the series of reform laws (the so-called April Laws) of the revolutionary parliament of 1848, which were based on 12 points that established modern civil and political rights and economic and societal reforms in Hungary. The April Laws of the Hungarian revolutionary parliament (with the exception of the laws based on the 9th and 10th points) were restored by Franz Joseph.

Under the Compromise, the lands of the House of Habsburg were reorganized as a real union between the Austrian Empire and the Kingdom of Hungary, headed by a single monarch who reigned as Emperor of Austria in the Austrian half of the empire, and as King of Hungary in the Kingdom of Hungary. The Cisleithanian (Austrian) and Transleithanian (Hungarian) states were governed by separate parliaments and prime ministers. The two countries conducted unified diplomatic and defense policies. For these purposes, common ministries of foreign affairs and defense were maintained under the monarch's direct authority, as was a third finance ministry responsible only for financing the two common portfolios.

The relationship of Hungary to Austria before the 1848 revolution had been personal union, whereas after the compromise of 1867 its status was reduced to partnership in a real union. Thus Hungarian society widely considered the compromise as a betrayal of the vital Hungarian interests and the achievements of the reforms of 1848. The compromise remained bitterly unpopular among ethnic Hungarian voters: ethnic Hungarians did not generally support the ruling Liberal Party in Hungarian parliamentary elections. Therefore, the political maintenance of the Austro-Hungarian Compromise, and thus Austria-Hungary itself, was mostly a result of the popularity of the pro-compromise ruling Liberal Party among ethnic minority voters in the Kingdom of Hungary.

According to Emperor Franz Joseph, "There were three of us who made the agreement: Deák, Andrássy and myself."

== Historical background ==
=== 1526–1848 ===
In the Middle Ages, the Duchy of Austria was an autonomous state within the Holy Roman Empire, ruled by the House of Habsburg, and the Kingdom of Hungary was a sovereign state outside the empire. In 1526, Hungary was defeated and partially conquered by the Ottoman Empire. King Louis II of Hungary and Bohemia had no legitimate heir and died young in the Battle of Mohács. Louis II's brother-in-law, Ferdinand I of Habsburg, was elected King of Hungary by a rump Parliament in Pozsony (now Bratislava) in December 1526. The Ottomans were subsequently driven out of Hungary by the cooperation of international Western Christian forces led by Prince Eugene of Savoy between 1686 and 1699. From 1526 to 1804, Hungary was ruled by the Habsburg dynasty as kings of Hungary, but remained nominally and legally separate from the other lands of the Habsburg monarchy. Unlike other Habsburg-ruled areas, the Kingdom of Hungary had an old historic constitution, which limited the power of the Crown and had greatly increased the authority of the parliament since the 13th century. The Golden Bull of 1222 was one of the earliest examples of constitutional limits being placed on the powers of a European monarch, which was forced on the Hungarian king in much the same way King John of England was made to sign the Magna Carta.

The Hungarian parliament was the most important political assembly since the 12th century, which emerged to the position of the supreme legislative institution in the Kingdom of Hungary from the 1290s. Royal decrees were kept inferior to acts of parliament; as such, they could not contravene statutory laws or the cardinal tenets of the historical constitution.

In 1804, Francis II, Holy Roman Emperor, who was also ruler of the lands of the Habsburg monarchy, founded the Empire of Austria in which most his so-called Erblande lands were included. However the new Erblande term was not applied to Kingdom of Hungary. In doing so he created a formal overarching structure for the Habsburg Monarchy, which had functioned as a composite monarchy for about 300 years. (Composite states/monarchies were the most common / dominant form of states in early modern era Europe.) The Holy Roman Empire was abolished in 1806. The Kingdom of Hungary had always been considered a separate realm, the country's status was affirmed by Article X, which was added to Hungary's constitution in 1790 during the phase of the composite monarchy; it described the state as a Regnum Independens. From the perspective of the Court since 1723, regnum Hungariae had been a hereditary province of the dynasty's three main branches on both lines. From the perspective of the ország (the country), Hungary was regnum independens, a separate Land as the above-mentioned Article X of 1790 stipulated. The Court reassured the diet, however, that the assumption of the monarch's newly adopted title (Emperor of Austria) did not in any sense affect the laws and the constitution on the territory of Kingdom of Hungary. Hungary's affairs continued to be administered by its own institutions (King and Diet and the local governments of its counties) as they had been previously. Thus, under the new arrangements, no Austrian imperial institutions were involved in its internal government. The Hungarian legal system and judicial system remained separated and independent from the unified legal and judicial systems of the other Habsburg ruled areas.

Accordingly, the administration and the structures of central government of Kingdom of Hungary also remained separate from the Austrian administration and Austrian government until the 1848 revolution. Hungary was governed to a greater degree by the Council of Lieutenancy of Hungary (the Gubernium) in Pressburg (Pozsony) and, to a lesser extent, by the Hungarian Royal Court Chancellery in Vienna, independent of the Imperial Chancellery of Austria.

From 1526 to 1851, the Kingdom of Hungary maintained its own customs borders, which separated Hungary from the united customs system of other Habsburg-ruled territories.

The involvement and integration of Kingdom of Hungary into a different state was legally impossible, due to the provisions of the old Hungarian constitution and Hungarian public law.

"At any time in the past, Hungary might have made peace with a power with which Austria was at war, if the kings had not falsified their oath by not assembling the Hungarian Parliament: for the Diet always had the lawful right of [declaring] War and Peace."

The other serious problem for the Habsburgs was the traditionally highly autonomous counties of Hungary, which proved to be a solid and major obstacle in the construction of absolutism in Hungary. The counties were the centers of local public administration and local politics in Hungary, and they possessed a recognized right to refuse to carry out any "unlawful" (unconstitutional) royal orders. Thus, it was possible to question the legality of a surprisingly high proportion of the royal orders which emanated from Vienna.

=== Revolution and military dictatorship ===
==== April laws and fundamental reforms in Hungary ====
The April Laws, also known as 'March Laws', were a set of statutes enacted by Lajos Kossuth aimed at transforming the Kingdom of Hungary into a modern parliamentary democracy and nation-state. These laws were approved by the Hungarian Diet in March 1848 in Pozsony (Pressburg, now Bratislava, Slovakia) and were signed by king Ferdinand V at the Primate's Palace in the same city on 11 April 1848.

The April Laws completely abolished all privileges of the Hungarian nobility. In April 1848, Hungary became the third country in Continental Europe—following France (1791) and Belgium (1831)—to establish legislation for democratic parliamentary elections. The new suffrage law (Act V of 1848) replaced the feudal estates-based parliament (Estates General) with a democratic representative parliament, offering the broadest suffrage rights in Europe at that time. The imperative program included Hungarian control over its popular national guard, the national budget, and foreign policy, as well as the abolition of serfdom.

In 1848, the young Austrian monarch, Franz Joseph, arbitrarily "revoked" these laws without any legal authority. This act was unconstitutional, as the laws remained in force due to having been signed by his uncle, King Ferdinand I, and he had no right to "revoke" them.

==== The newly created Habsburg constitution ====
On 7 March 1849, an imperial proclamation was issued in the name of Emperor Franz Joseph, establishing a unified constitution for the entire empire. Under this new decree, the traditional territorial integrity of the Kingdom of Hungary would be dismantled and divided into five distinct military districts, while the Principality of Transylvania would be reestablished. Austrian Prime Minister Prince Felix of Schwarzenberg and his government, which took office in November 1848, embarked on a radically new imperial policy. Their aim was to cultivate a cohesive empire in accordance with the imperial constitution proclaimed by Franz Joseph I in Olomouc on 4 March 1849. Consequently, this initiative entailed the abolition of Hungary's constitution and its territorial integrity. The centralizing March Constitution of Austria introduced neo-absolutism within Habsburg-ruled territories, granting the monarch absolute power. The Austrian constitution was ratified by the Imperial Diet of Austria, in which Hungary had no representation and had historically lacked legislative authority over the Kingdom of Hungary. Nevertheless, the constitution also sought to dismantle the Diet of Hungary, which had served as the supreme legislative body in Hungary since the late 12th century. The new Austrian constitution also contravened Hungary's historical constitution and sought to invalidate it.

==== Usurpation problem of Franz Joseph ====
Constitutionally, Franz Joseph's uncle Ferdinand was still the legal king of Hungary. If there was no possibility to inherit the throne automatically due to the death of the predecessor king (since King Ferdinand was still alive), but the monarch wanted to relinquish his throne and appoint another king before his death, technically only one legal solution remained: the parliament had the power to dethrone the king and elect a new king. Due to the legal and military tensions, the Hungarian parliament did not grant Franz Joseph that favour.

Even during the long personal union between the Kingdom of Hungary and other Habsburg ruled areas, the Habsburg monarchs had to be crowned as King of Hungary in order to promulgate laws there or exercise royal prerogatives in the territory of the Kingdom of Hungary. From a legal point of view, according to the coronation oath, a crowned Hungarian king could not relinquish the Hungarian throne during his life; if the king was alive and unable to do his duty as ruler, a governor (or regent, as they would be called in English) had to assume the royal duties.

On 7 December 1848, the Diet of Hungary formally refused to acknowledge the title of the new king, "as without the knowledge and consent of the diet no one could sit on the Hungarian throne", and called the nation to arms. While in most Western European countries (like France and the United Kingdom) the monarch's reign began immediately upon the death of their predecessor, in Hungary the coronation was indispensable; if it were not properly executed, the kingdom remained "orphaned".

Francis Joseph was, in the strict constitutional sense, a textbook usurper in Hungary: under the Pragmatic Sanction of 1723 (Arts. I–III) and the established Hungarian constitutional law governing succession and coronation, the throne was not vacant while the crowned King Ferdinand V was still alive, and Ferdinand’s unilateral abdication could not by itself make Francis Joseph King of Hungary; without the consent of the Hungarian Diet, the constitutional oath, and coronation with the Holy Crown, Francis Joseph had no lawful authority to exercise the Hungarian royal power—his seizure of that power thus constituting a clear case of usurpation.

==== Military dictatorship ====
During the unsuccessful Hungarian Revolution of 1848, the Magyars came close to severing ties with the Habsburg dynasty, but their efforts were thwarted by the Austrian Empire with military intervention from the Russian Empire. Following the restoration of Habsburg authority, Hungary was placed under martial law. A military dictatorship was created in Hungary.

Every facet of Hungarian life was subjected to rigorous scrutiny and Austrian governmental control.

German was declared the official language of public administration. An edict issued on 9 October 1849 placed education under state oversight, with the curriculum dictated by the government. The teaching of national history was restricted, and history was presented from a Habsburg perspective. Even the Hungarian Academy of Sciences, a stronghold of Hungarian culture, was kept under strict control, being staffed predominantly by foreigners, mostly Germans, and effectively became defunct until the end of 1858. In response, Hungarians engaged in passive resistance, and anti-Habsburg and anti-German sentiments ran high. In the following years, the empire introduced several reforms but failed to address the underlying issues.

After the Hungarian Revolution of 1848–49, Hungary's independent customs system was abolished, and on 1 October 1851, it became part of the unified imperial customs system.

== Austrian military and economic crisis and adoption ==
The suppression of the 1848 Revolutions and the Russian intervention had a very high price. In 1858 already 40 percent of the Austrian Imperial government's expenditures went to service the state debt. An expensive mobilization during the Crimean War (1853–1856) and a disastrous campaign against Piedmont-Sardinia in 1859 brought the state to the verge of bankruptcy. The threat of fiscal insolvency and the demands of his creditors for an open and credible budgetary process forced the unwilling Franz Joseph to authorize political reform.

In 1866, Austria was completely defeated in the Austro-Prussian War. Its position as the leading state of Germany ended, and the remaining German minor states were soon absorbed into the German Empire, created by Prussia's Bismarck. Austria also lost much of its remaining claims and influence in Italy, which had been its chief foreign policy interest.

After a period of Greater German ambitions, when Austria tried to establish itself as the leading German power, Austria again needed to redefine itself to maintain unity in the face of nationalism.

As a consequence of the Second Italian War of Independence and the Austro-Prussian War, the Habsburg Empire was on the verge of collapse in 1866, as these wars caused monumental state debt and a financial crisis. The Habsburgs were forced to reconcile with Hungary, to save their empire and dynasty. The Habsburgs and part of the Hungarian political elite arranged the Austro-Hungarian Compromise of 1867. The Compromise was arranged and legitimated by a very small part of the Hungarian society (suffrage was very limited: less than 8% of the population had voting rights), and was seen by a very large part of the population as betrayal of the Hungarian cause and the heritage of the 1848–49 War of Independence. This caused deep and lasting cracks in Hungarian society.

Hungarian statesman Ferenc Deák is considered the intellectual force behind the Compromise. Deák initially wanted independence for Hungary and supported the 1848 Revolution, but he broke with hardline nationalists and advocated a modified union under the Habsburgs. Deák believed that while Hungary had the right to full internal independence, the terms of the Pragmatic Sanction of 1723 made questions of defense and foreign affairs "common" to both Austria and Hungary. The Pragmatic Sanction of 1723 had great impact on the Austro-Hungarian Compromise of 1867. As Deák argued, according to the Pragmatic Sanction of 1723, constitutional governing of Hungary was a fundamental prerequisite of the Habsburg rule over Hungary. The foreign policy and defense, as well as financing them, were the most important joint affairs of Austria-Hungary, the resulting dual monarchy, to be based on the Pragmatic Sanction of 1723. He also felt that Hungary benefited from continued union with wealthier, more industrialized Austria and that the Compromise would end the continual pressures on Austria to choose between the Magyars and the Slavs of the Kingdom of Hungary. Imperial Chancellor Beust quickly negotiated the Compromise with the Hungarian leaders. Beust was particularly eager to renew the conflict with Prussia and thought a quick settlement with Hungary would make that possible. Franz Joseph and Deák signed the Compromise, and it was ratified by the restored Diet of Hungary on 29 May 1867.

Beust's revenge against Prussia did not materialize. When, in 1870, Beust wanted Austria–Hungary to support France against Prussia, Hungarian Prime Minister Gyula Andrássy was "vigorously opposed" and effectively vetoed Austrian intervention.

The settlement with Hungary consisted then of three parts: the political settlement, which was to be permanent and would remain part of the fundamental constitution of the monarchy; the periodical financial settlement, determining the partition of the common expenses as arranged by the Quota-Deputations and ratified by the parliaments; and the Customs Union and the agreement on currency, a voluntary, reversible arrangement between the two governments and parliaments.

=== Resolution of the Usurpation problem and Coronation ===
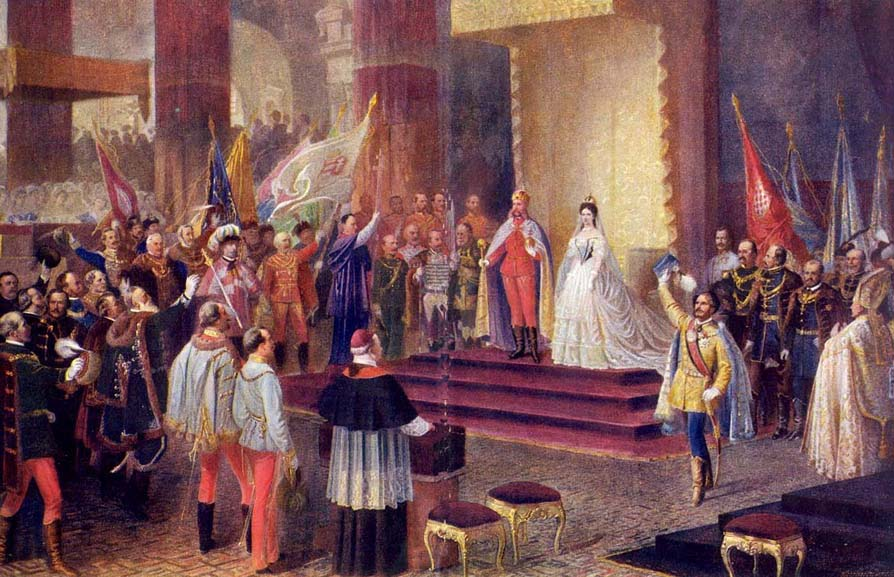
Coronation of Francis Joseph I and Elisabeth Amalie at Matthias Church, Buda, 8 June 1867

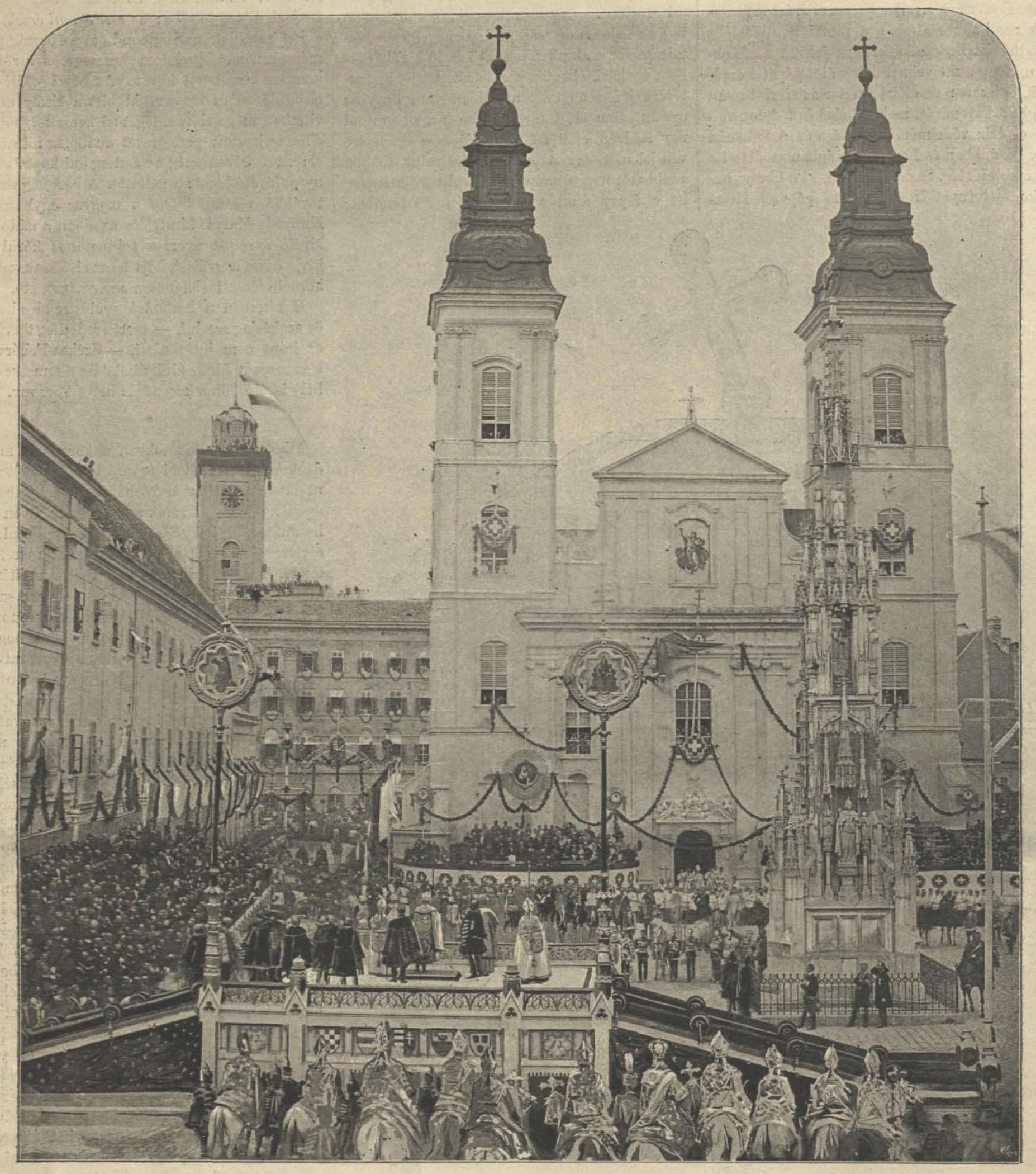
Photo of the coronation oath in Pest in front of the Inner City Parish Church (Budapest)

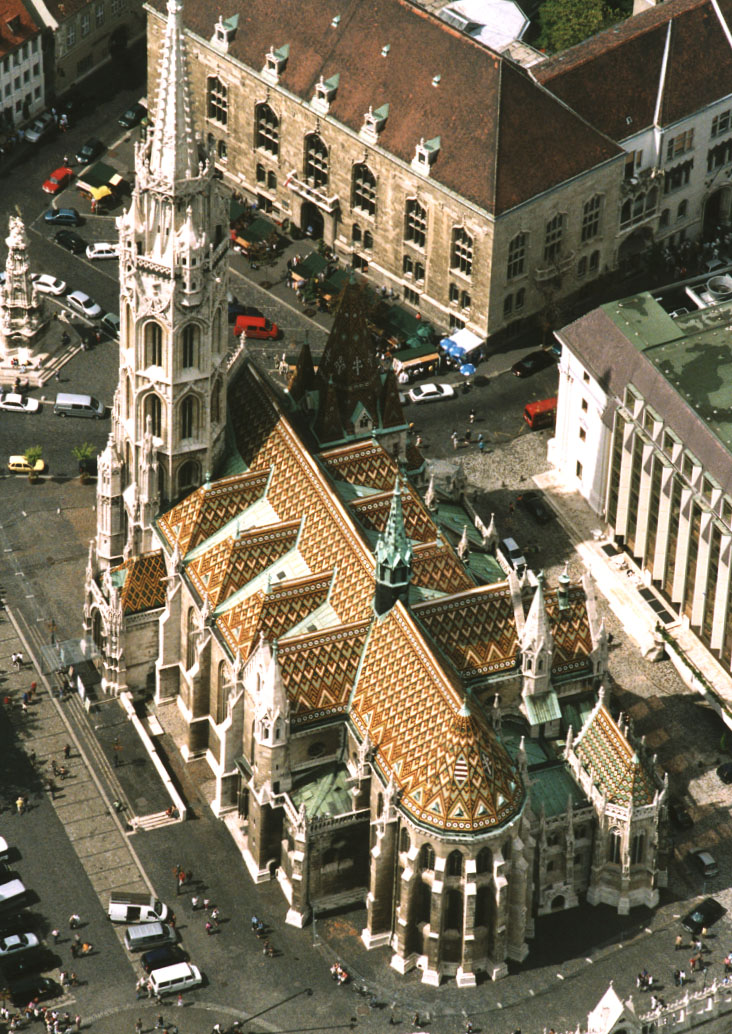
The Coronation Church of Our Lady and – top left – also known as Matthias Church

On 8 June 1867, following the taking of the prescribed coronation oath in Matthias Church in Buda, Franz Joseph I was solemnly crowned King of Hungary by János Simor, Archbishop of Esztergom and Primate of Hungary, with Prime Minister Gyula Andrássy performing the traditional role of placing the Crown of Saint Stephen upon the monarch’s head, thereby completing his formal accession to the Hungarian throne in accordance with the kingdom’s constitutional traditions.

The Hungarian Parliament formally recognised Franz Joseph I as the "lawful and legitimate King of Hungary" through Act I of 1867, which provided for his coronation in accordance with the constitutional traditions of the Kingdom of Hungary, while Act II of 1867 incorporated his coronation diploma and oath into Hungarian law, thereby reaffirming the kingdom’s traditional historic constitutional rights and legal guarantees.

=== The resistance of Austrian politicians and administration ===
Before 1849, Hungary's government, administration, judiciary, and political institutions had never been under the rule of the Austrian government, only a mere personal union existed between Kingdom of Hungary and the Austrian Empire.

In the aftermath of the suppression of the Hungarian Revolution in 1849, the Austrian government and political elite were determined to retain the power they had acquired by bringing a vast territory and population under their direct administrative and political control, an expansion of state authority unprecedented in scale in Austrian history.

In 1849, the Habsburg regime established an extensive centralized administrative apparatus in Hungary, staffed by Czech and Austrian-German born officials sent from other parts of the empire. Hungarian critics derisively referred to these officials as "Bach Hussars," after Interior Minister Alexander Bach, alluding to the distinctive hussar-inspired uniforms worn by certain officials of the neo-absolutist administration. Alongside this administrative apparatus, the regime expanded its system of political surveillance, employing a secret police network and paid informers to monitor opposition to Habsburg rule.

The Austro-Hungarian Compromise of 1867 and the restoration of constitutional government in Hungary led to the dismissal of many foreign officials associated with the neo-absolutist administration, most of whom faced prolonged unemployment, with many returning to the German- and Slavic-speaking crownlands of the empire in search of new positions in public service.

Although it is commonly referred to as the Austro-Hungarian Compromise, in constitutional terms it was in fact concluded between Emperor Francis Joseph and the Hungarian parliamentary majority, while the Austrian side had no decisive say in the negotiations. In 1865, the Emperor had even suspended the Austrian Parliament, specifically to remove the Austrian side from the equation and facilitate an agreement with the Hungarians.

In Austria, the Dual Monarchy was unpopular and was widely regarded as a forced concession to the Hungarians; the Austrian Parliament was ultimately presented with a fait accompli.

Under pressure from Emperor Francis Joseph, who regarded an agreement with Hungary as essential to preserving the monarchy after Austria’s military defeats, the Austrian political establishment was ultimately compelled to accept the Compromise. Baron Friedrich Ferdinand von Beust was among the few Austrian statesmen who supported the Compromise, as he regarded it as the only means of preserving the monarchy’s status as a great power. As Austrian Minister-President and Foreign Minister, Beust played a crucial role in advancing the settlement, which was presented to the Austrian Reichsrat as an accomplished fact rather than an agreement open to renegotiation. The Austrian Reichsrat ultimately endorsed the arrangement in December 1867, while its constitutional implementation was accompanied by the December Constitution, including the law on the common affairs of the monarchy (Reichsgesetzblatt No. 146/1867), which provided its legal basis of the compromise in Austria.

=== Hungarian resistance against the Compromise ===
Although the Compromise of 1867 established the Austro-Hungarian Monarchy and restored constitutional government in Hungary, with Count Gyula Andrássy becoming prime minister, its acceptance was far from universal. For supporters of full Hungarian independence, the settlement represented a betrayal of the political legacy of the Revolution of 1848–1849.

In his open letter to Ferenc Deák, dated 22 May 1867 and first published in the Magyar Újság (Hungarian News) on 26 May, Lajos Kossuth warned that the settlement would lead to the loss of Hungary's political independence. In the letter, later known as the Cassandra Letter, Kossuth wrote: “I see in this act the death of the nation”, and concluded his appeal with the warning: “But consider that Cassandra was right!” (Note: The quotations are translations of Kossuth's original Hungarian: “én e tényben a nemzet halálát látom” and “De Te fontold meg, hogy Cassandrának igaza volt!”)

Inspired by Lajos Kossuth's letters against the Compromise, democratic circles were founded across the country, forming a highly visible wave of protest against the compromise. Guided by Kossuth's directions from exile, the circles openly agitated against the Compromise and demanded the full restoration of the 1848 foundations of independence.

The Compromise was negotiated and enacted by a narrow political elite, while the restricted franchise excluded most of the population from parliamentary elections. The radical opposition consequently disputed not only the terms of the settlement but also its political legitimacy, arguing that the parliament elected in 1865 had not received a mandate to enact a constitutional settlement with Austria.

Securing public acceptance of the Compromise proved difficult in Hungary. The counties of Heves, Pest and Szatmár were among those that rejected the settlement and declared their support for Kossuth. The opposition organised a nation-wide network of democratic circles, while mass anti-government and anti-Compromise meetings, attended by thousands, took place across the Great Hungarian Plain. The democratic-circle movement sent declarations of confidence to Kossuth and submitted petitions against the common affairs established by the Compromise; it spread rapidly and mobilised large numbers of poor peasants.

The new Hungarian government responded with coercive measures. The government portrayed these restrictions as temporary emergency measures required by an acute crisis of public order and by the fragility of the newly created constitutional regime. Yet, in order to overcome that crisis, it temporarily placed the preservation of the state and the consolidation of the Compromise above elements of its own liberal programme, curtailing freedoms of association, assembly and the press until it considered the new order secure. It prosecuted and imprisoned László Böszörményi, editor of the radical opposition newspaper Magyar Újság, for publishing one of Kossuth's letters; Böszörményi was sentenced to one year in prison and died in custody in March 1869. In April 1868 the government banned the democratic circles. In Heves County, where resistance was particularly strong, it temporarily suspended the county assembly and appointed Gyula Szapáry as government commissioner to administer the county.

== Terms ==
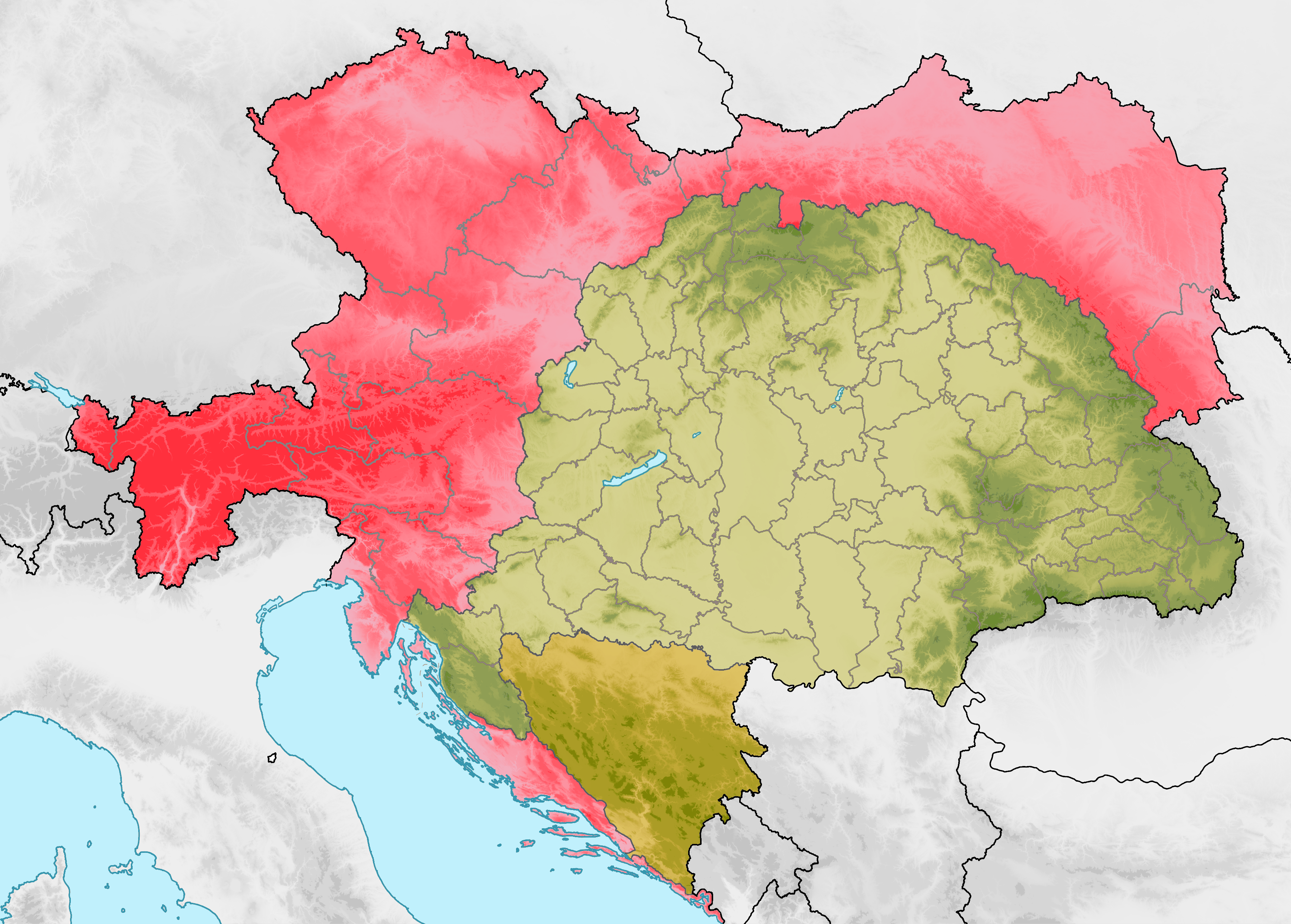
The Austro-Hungarian Compromise. Pink: Cisleithania; green: Transleithania; brown: condominium of Bosnia and Herzegovina (added 1908)

Under the Compromise:

- The old historic constitution of Hungary was restored.
- The Hungarian parliament was re-established (which had been the supreme legislative power in Hungary since the 12th century), as it was before 1849. Each part of the Monarchy had its own government, headed by its own prime minister. The "dual monarchy" consisted of the Emperor-King, and the common ministers of foreign affairs, defense, and a finance ministry only for expenditures of the Common Army, navy and diplomatic service.
- The Hungarian legal system and Hungarian laws were restored in the territory of the Kingdom of Hungary. During the negotiations of the compromise, even the April Laws of the Hungarian revolutionary parliament (with the exception of the laws based on the 9th and 10th points) were also accepted by the monarch.
- The traditionally independent and separate judicial system of Hungary was restored.
- Austria–Hungary, as a common entity, had no jurisdiction and legislative power, which was shaped by the fact that there was no common parliament. The common diplomatic and military affairs were managed by delegations from the Imperial Council and the Hungarian parliament. The delegations had 60 members from the Imperial Council, and 60 members from the Hungarian parliament, and the ratios of various political fractions exactly and proportionally mirrored their own political parties of their parliaments. The members of the delegations from the two parliaments had no right to give speeches, to debate, or introduce new ideas during the meetings; thus they were nothing more than the extended arms of their own parliaments. The only function of the delegates was to cast their votes according to the previously made decisions of their political factions in the Austrian and the Hungarian parliaments. All common decisions had to be ratified by the Austrian parliament to be valid on Austrian territory, and by the Hungarian parliament to be valid on the territory of Kingdom of Hungary. The Austrian and Hungarian delegations hold their joint meeting in Vienna in every odd year, and in Pest in every even year.
- With the exception of the territory of the Bosnian Condominium, Austria and Hungary did not form a common sovereign territory in international law (i.e. the Kingdom of Hungary and the Empire of Austria were different countries). Thus regarding territorial changes during peace treaties, the Empire of Austria and Kingdom of Hungary had to act independently as independent countries: a delegate from the Austrian parliament had the right to sign peace treaties related to territorial changes of the Austrian Empire, and respectively, a delegate from the Hungarian parliament had the right to sign peace treaties regarding to territorial changes of the Kingdom of Hungary. See: Treaty of Saint-Germain and Treaty of Trianon
- A common Ministry of Foreign Affairs was created, responsible for diplomacy and foreign policy. Further information: Foreign Ministry of Austria-Hungary
- There was no common citizenship in Austria–Hungary: one was either an Austrian citizen or a Hungarian citizen, never both. Austria–Hungary used two separate passports: the Austrian passport and the Hungarian one. There was no common passport.
- A common finance ministry was founded, only for the expenditures of the Common Army, the navy and the diplomatic service and for the issue of banknotes. It was headed by the Common Finance Minister. All other expenditures belonged to the Austrian Finance Ministry in the Austrian Empire and the Hungarian Finance Ministry in the Kingdom of Hungary. The Austrian finance minister was subordinated only to the Minister-President of Austria in the Austrian Empire, and the Hungarian Finance Minister was subordinated only to the Prime Minister of Hungary.
- The monetary and economic terms of the Compromise and the customs union had to be renegotiated every ten years.
- Despite Austria and Hungary sharing a common currency, they were fiscally sovereign and independent entities.
- The international commercial treaties and trade agreements were conducted independently by Austria and Hungary, as independent nations. The Common Finance Ministry had no competence in the international commercial treaties and trade agreements of the Austrian state or the Hungarian state.
- The Royal Hungarian Honvéd was restored, and the Imperial-Royal Landwehr was created, but both states had to continue to finance the Austro-Hungarian Common Army, much larger than both. A common Austro-Hungarian War Ministry was formed immediately for the large Common Army, but it had no right to command directly the smaller Austrian Landwehr and the Hungarian Honvéd armies, which were respectively placed under the direct control of the separate Austrian and Hungarian Ministries of defense. The Austrian and Hungarian Ministers of defense were not placed under the command and jurisdiction of the Common War Ministry; they were subordinated only to their own prime ministers and the respective parliaments in Vienna and Budapest. The Hungarian Honvéd army could join the imperial army only with the explicit authorization of the Hungarian government. Further information: Imperial and Royal Ministry of War
- Hungary took on a large part of the towering Austrian state debt.
- The Emperor-King held all authority over the structure, organization, and administration of the three armies. He appointed the senior officials, had the right to declare war, and was the commander-in-chief of the army.
- The Emperor-King had the right to declare a state of emergency.
- The Emperor-King had the right of preliminary royal assent to every bill the Cabinet Council wanted to report to the National Assembly. He had the right to veto any law passed by the National Assemblies.
- The Emperor-King had the right to dissolve the National Assemblies and of the declaration of new parliamentary elections.
- The Emperor-King had the right to appoint and dismiss the members of the Cabinet Councils.

The power of the monarch significantly increased in a comparison with the pre-1848 status of Hungary. This meant a great reduction in Hungarian sovereignty and autonomy, even in comparison with the pre-1848 status quo.

== Continuing pressures ==
=== Dominance of the Liberal Party ===
The Austro-Hungarian compromise and its supporting liberal parliamentary parties remained bitterly unpopular among the ethnic Hungarian voters, and the continuous successes of the pro-compromise Liberal Party in the Hungarian parliamentary elections caused long lasting frustration for Hungarians. The ethnic minorities had the key role in the political maintenance of the compromise in Hungary, because they were able to vote the pro-compromise liberal parties into the position of the majority/ruling parties of the Hungarian parliament. The pro-compromise Liberal Party of Hungary was the most popular among ethnic minority voters, however i.e. the Slovak, Serb and Romanian minority parties remained unpopular among their own ethnic minority voters. The coalitions of Hungarian nationalist parties – which were supported by the overwhelming majority of ethnic Hungarian voters – always remained in the opposition, with the exception of the 1906–1910 period, where the Hungarian-supported nationalist parties were able to form a government.

=== Ethnic minorities ===
Before World War I, only three European countries declared ethnic minority rights, and enacted minority-protecting laws: the first was Hungary (1849 and 1868), the second was Austria (1867), and the third was Belgium (1898). In contrast, the legal systems of other pre-WW1 era European countries did not allow the use of European minority languages in primary schools, in cultural institutions, in offices of public administration and at the legal courts.

The resulting system was maintained until the dissolution of the dual monarchy after World War I. The favoritism shown to the Magyars, the second largest ethnic group in the dual monarchy after the Germans, caused discontent on the part of other ethnic groups like the Slovaks and Romanians. Although a "Nationalities Law" was enacted to preserve the rights of ethnic minorities, the two parliaments took very different approaches to this issue.

The basic problem in the later years was that the Compromise with Hungary only encouraged the appetites of non-Hungarian minorities in Hungary that were historically within the boundaries of the Hungarian Kingdom. The majority of Hungarians felt they had accepted the Compromise only under coercion. The Hungarian monarchs were always crowned as King of Hungary, due to the Hungarian coronation oath they had to agree to uphold the old constitutional arrangements of the country and preserve the territorial integrity of the Hungarian realm. This coronation oath was obligatory for the Hungarian monarchs during the coronation process since the Golden Bull of 1222. The Hungarians, who were regarded as equal after the Compromise, only partially acquiesced to granting "their" minorities recognition and local autonomy.

In the Kingdom of Hungary, several ethnic minorities faced increased pressures of Magyarization. Further, the renegotiation that occurred every ten years often led to constitutional crises. Ultimately, although the Compromise hoped to fix the problems faced by a multi-national state while maintaining the benefits of a large state, the new system still faced the same internal pressures as the old. To what extent the dual monarchy stabilized the country in the face of national awakenings and to what extent it alleviated or aggravated the situation is still debated today.

In a letter on 1 February 1913, to Foreign Minister Berchtold, Archduke Franz Ferdinand said that "irredentism in our country ... will cease immediately if our Slavs are given a comfortable, fair and good life" instead of being trampled on (as they were being trampled on by the Hungarians).

== Influence in Ireland ==
The Austro-Hungarian Compromise is occasionally cited in speculative and folkloric accounts as having an influence in Ireland during the Irish Home Rule movement. While there is no historical evidence to support these claims, some narratives suggest that Irish nationalist leaders viewed the Compromise as a model for negotiating home rule. According to these accounts, the structure of the Dual Monarchy, which granted Hungary significant autonomy while preserving its union with Austria, was admired by Irish political thinkers. This theoretical influence is said to have shaped discussions within the Home Rule movement, fostering ideas of an "Irish-British dual governance" arrangement.

As early as the mid-1880s, Lord Salisbury, leader of the British Conservative Party, had contemplated using the 1867 Austro-Hungarian example as a model for a reformed relationship between Britain and Ireland. In 1904, Arthur Griffith published the influential book The Resurrection of Hungary: A Parallel for Ireland, setting out a detailed proposal for an Anglo-Irish dual monarchy similar to the Austro-Hungarian one. This dual monarchy model was advocated by Griffith's Sinn Féin party in its early years of existence and had a considerable influence on the development of Irish nationalism – though after the Easter Rising and subsequent October 1917 Ardfheis, it was dropped in favour of a fully independent republic.

== See also ==
- Fundamental Articles of 1871

== Sources ==
- Cornwall, Mark (2002), Last Years of Austria-Hungary: A Multi-National Experiment in Early Twentieth-Century Europe (2nd ed.), University of Exeter Press.
- Seton-Watson, R. W. (1925), "Transylvania since 1867", The Slavonic Review, vol. 4, no. 10, Modern Humanities Research Association, pp. 101–23, JSTOR 4201928.
- Seton-Watson, R. W. (1939), "The Austro-Hungarian Ausgleich of 1867", The Slavonic and East European Review, vol. 19, no. 19.53/54, Modern Humanities Research Association, pp. 123–40, JSTOR 4203588.
- Sowards, Steven W. (23 April 2004), Nationalism in Hungary, 1848–1867. Twenty Five Lectures on Modern Balkan History, Michigan State University.
- Sugar, Peter F. (1994). A History of Hungary. Indiana University Press. ISBN 025320867X.
- Taylor, A. J. P. (1952), The Habsburg Monarchy, 1815 – 1918: A history of the Austrian Empire and Austria-Hungary., New York: Macmillan.
- Tihany, Leslie C. (1969), "The Austro-Hungarian Compromise, 1867–1918: A Half Century of Diagnosis; Fifty Years of Post-Mortem", Central European History, vol. 2, no. 2, Cambridge University Press, Central European History Society, pp. 114–38, doi:10.1017/s0008938900000169, JSTOR 4545523, S2CID 145522363.
