= The Resurrection of Hungary =

1904 book by Arthur Griffith

The Resurrection of Hungary: A Parallel for Ireland
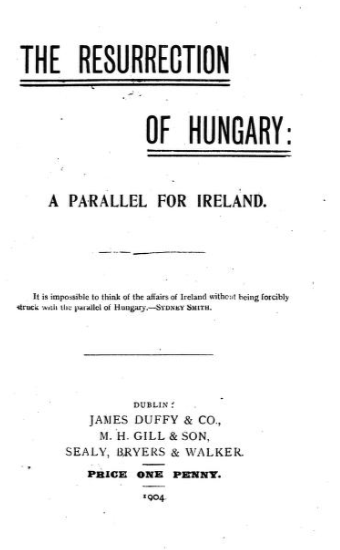
- Title page for The Resurrection of Hungary: A Parallel for Ireland (1904)
- Author: Arthur Griffith
- Genre: Politics
- Publication date: 1904

The Resurrection of Hungary: A Parallel for Ireland was a book published by Arthur Griffith in 1904 in which he outlined his ideas for an Anglo-Irish dual monarchy. He proposed that the former kingdoms which had created the United Kingdom of Great Britain and Ireland in 1801, namely, the Kingdom of Great Britain and the Kingdom of Ireland, return to the pre-1801 arrangement whereby they had two governments but a shared king. The policy, which was modelled on Hungary's achievement of equal status with Austria under the Habsburg emperor/king, became the basis for the policy of Griffith's new Sinn Féin party. He proposed a dual monarchy, similar to the equivalent of the Austria-Hungary, formed under the Compromise of 1867.

Griffith summed up his ideas in the book by comparing the relative status of Hungary vis-à-vis Austria and Ireland vis-à-vis Great Britain:

The Hungarians resorted to a manly policy of passive resistance and non-recognition of Austria’s right to rule – the Irish resorted to parliamentarianism, implying recognition of an English right to rule this country. And one nation today is rich, powerful and able to defy her conqueror, while the other is poor, weak and more tightly held in the conqueror’s grasp.

He advocated a policy of abstentionism from the institutions of the United Kingdom and a return to the Constitution of 1782 agreed between the British government and the Parliament of Ireland in 1782.

Griffith called his new party, Sinn Féin, a "King, Lords and Commons Party". The Anglo-Irish Empire idea, though strongly associated with Griffith, was not uniquely his creation. As early as the mid-1880s Lord Salisbury, leader of the Conservative Party had contemplated using the 1867 Austro-Hungarian example as a model for a reformed relationship between Britain and Ireland.

From 1917 the party while maintaining its commitment to abstentionism, abandoned Griffith's proposal for having the British monarch on the Irish throne as King of Ireland. Instead it was split between republicans (those associated with the Easter Rising in 1916 and who had subsequently joined Sinn Féin) who advocated the creation of a new republic with an elected head of state, and those who advocated the creation of an Irish monarchy, albeit now with a monarch chosen from any royal house but the House of Windsor.

The concept was ridiculed by the nationalist commentator D. P. Moran, who called its supporters the "Green Hungarian Band".

In October 1917, the party's Ard Fheis adopted a motion committing the party to establishing a republic before holding a referendum on whether to install a monarchy or not, once the monarch chosen was not from the House of Windsor. The party later committed itself unambiguously to supporting a republic.

Given its introduction of the concept of abstentionism, and its formative role in the appearance of Sinn Féin, The Resurrection of Hungary was one of the most influential texts in 20th-century Irish history.

== Sources ==
- Arthur Griffith, The Resurrection of Hungary: A Parallel for Ireland (UCD Press, 2003 reprint) (1st edition at the Internet Archive, 3rd edition at the Internet Archive)
- F.S.L. Lyons, Ireland Since the Famine
