= Dual monarchy =

Monarchy over two kingdoms

Dual monarchy occurs when two separate kingdoms are ruled by the same monarch, follow the same foreign policy, exist in a customs union with each other, and have a combined military but are otherwise self-governing. The term is typically used to refer to Austria-Hungary, a dual monarchy that existed from 1867 to 1918 that spanned across parts of Central and Southern Europe, but applies to other dual monarchies such as the Kingdom of Nejd and Hejaz. Dual monarchy is an uncommon form of government, and has been practiced few times in history, although many of the world's most powerful countries have been or are dual monarchies.

In the 1870s, using the Dual Monarchy of Austria-Hungary as a model, the Prince of Wales (later King Edward VII) and William Ewart Gladstone proposed that Ireland and Great Britain form a dual monarchy. Their efforts were unsuccessful, but the idea was later used in 1904 by Arthur Griffith in his seminal work, The Resurrection of Hungary. Griffith noted how in 1867 Hungary went from being part of the Austrian Empire to a separate co-equal kingdom in Austria-Hungary. Though not a monarchist himself, Griffith advocated such an approach for the Anglo-Irish relationship. The idea was not embraced by other Irish political leaders, and Ireland eventually fought a war of independence (1919–1921) to secede from the United Kingdom of Great Britain and Ireland.

The idea had a great appeal in the political circles of Great Britain because of its success in integrating Scotland and England into Great Britain. The Stuart Kings of Scotland, starting with James VI, also were the heads of state of England, holding the English crown. After the 17th century brought three different civil wars, and a great deal of armed conflict, it was decided in 1707 to codify the unification of England and Scotland into the "perpetual" partnership promised by the Acts of Union. A similar series of historical events had earlier incorporated Wales into England. A century of personal union of the Crowns of Scotland and England also saw the monarchs use the parliaments of each nation against each other, and civil war, but generally benefitted the economic state of both nations. Indeed, it was the 1707 Acts which gave England and Scotland the name Great Britain. Despite its historical success, the proposal to merge Ireland into Great Britain with some form of home rule had been proposed for decades before finally coming to naught in the Irish War of Independence.

Later historians have used the term to refer to other examples where one king ruled two states, such as Henry V and Henry VI, who were effectively kings of both England and France in the fifteenth century as a result of the formation of a puppet state in a large area of France during the Hundred Years' War; Denmark–Norway, a dual monarchy that existed from 1537 to 1814; a century of personal union of Sweden and Norway (1814–1905); and the Polish–Lithuanian Commonwealth (1569–1795).

A dual monarchy is a stronger bond than a personal union, in which two or more kingdoms are ruled by the same person but there are no other shared government structures. States in personal union with each other have separate militaries, separate foreign policies and separate customs duties. In this sense Austria-Hungary was not a mere personal union, as both states shared a cabinet that governed foreign policy, the Army and common finances.

== Examples ==
- Union of the Crowns (1603–1707)
- Denmark–Norway (1537–1814)
- Polish–Lithuanian Commonwealth (1569–1795)
- Sweden–Norway (1814–1905)
- Austria-Hungary (1867–1918)
- Kingdom of Hejaz and Nejd (1926–1932)

== See also ==
- Commonwealth realms
- Composite monarchy
- Real union
