= Green Ensign =

Historical flag flown by Irish merchant vessels

- Use: Civil ensign
- Proportion: 1:2
- Adopted: British Merchant Navy
- Design: Green with the Union Jack occupying one quarter of the field and placed in the canton and a harp in the fly.

A post-1801 Green Ensign from the Royal Museums Greenwich

Green Ensign circa 1701

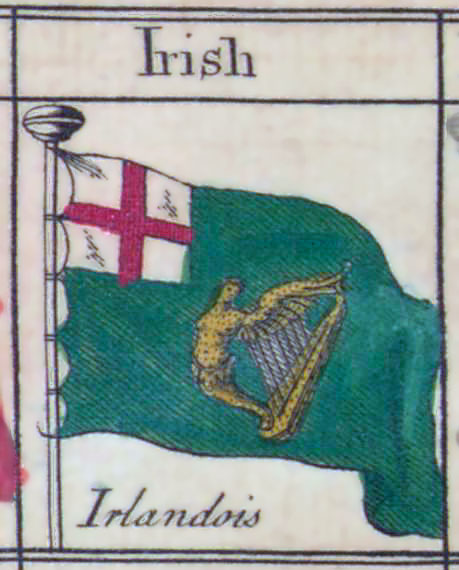
On a 1783 flag chart

The Green Ensign (Irish: An Meirge Uaine) is a historical flag flown by some Irish merchant vessels from the 17th century to the early 20th century. The flag consists of a green field with a golden Irish harp and a canton containing either St George's Cross or a version of the Union Jack.

This flag has appeared in these historical flag plates:

- 1685 Downman's Flag Chart
- 17th century A New Table of all the Ships, Collors or Ensings, in the Wholl Water World Newly Eneressed and Amende and all falts or Errors Corrected Never befor thytim brought to Light
- 1700 Len's Flag Chart
- c. 1700 Table des Pavillons quel on arbore dans toutes les Parties du Monde Connu (Peter Schenk the Elder)
- early 18th century: A new table of all the names of the principal parts and rigging of a man of war
- 1772 French Encyclopédie
- 1783 Bowles's Universal Display of the Naval Flags of all Nations
- 1799 Flags of all Nations
- 1848 Flaggen Aller Seefahrenden Nationen
- 1868 Johnson's new chart of national emblems
- 1889 Drawings of Flags of All Nations - British Admiralty
- 1917 National Geographic Flag Book

== Gallery ==
Sledge flag used in the Arctic by Henry Kellett during his 1852–1854 search for Franklin's lost expedition

Sledge flag used in Antarctica by Patrick Keohane during the Terra Nova Expedition (1910–1913)

== Unrelated similar ensigns ==
Flag of Gananoque, Ontario

Flag of Haverhill, Massachusetts

Flag of Newbury, Massachusetts

Flag of the British African Front

== See also ==
- Blue Ensign
- Red Ensign
- White Ensign
- Green harp flag
