= Inner City Parish Church in Pest =

Church in Budapest, Hungary

Church of the Blessed Virgin Mary (Budapest-Belvárosi Nagyboldogasszony), commonly known as the Inner City Parish Church
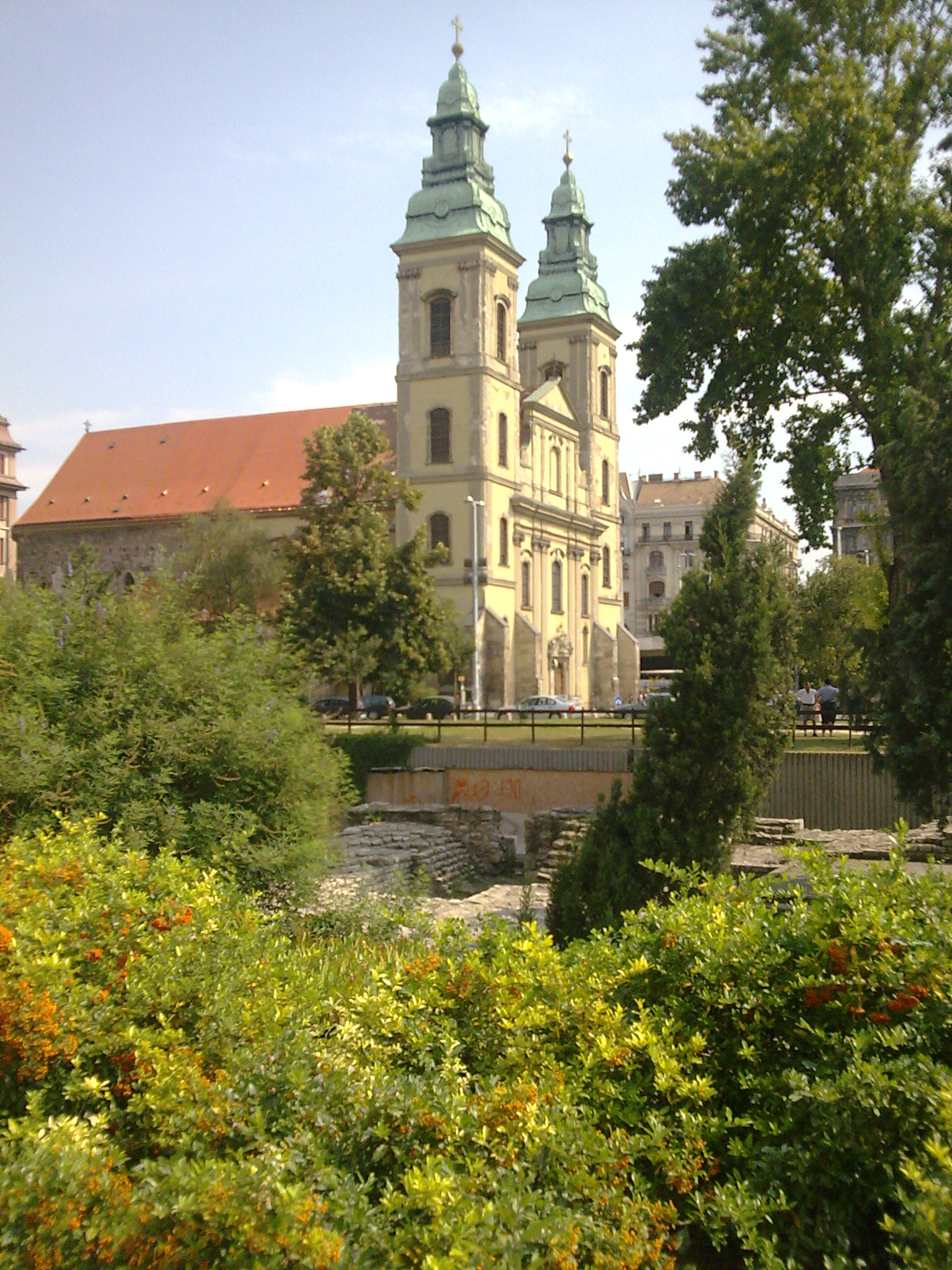

Religion
- Affiliation: Roman Catholic
- Diocese: Esztergom-Budapest
- Rite: Latin
- Ecclesiastical or organisational status: parish church
- Year consecrated: unknown
- Status: active

Location
- Location: Budapest, Hungary
- Interactive map of Church of the Blessed Virgin Mary (Budapest-Belvárosi Nagyboldogasszony), commonly known as the Inner City Parish Church
- Coordinates: 47°29′32″N 19°03′08″E

Architecture
- Architect: Pauer János György (1692–1752)
- Type: Neogothic
- Style: Neoclassical

Specifications
- Direction of façade: West
- Length: 118 m (387 ft 1.7 in)
- Width: 49 m (160 ft 9.1 in)
- Height (max): 100 m (328 ft 1.0 in)

Website
- Website of the church

Budapest's Inner City Parish Church (Budapest-Belvárosi Nagyboldogasszony), officially the Church of the Blessed Virgin Mary, is the main parish church of Budapest. It is often referred to as the City Parish Church, or Downtown Parish Church. It is located adjacent to the walls of the Roman Contra-Aquincum fort and the Elisabeth Bridge.

== History ==
The earliest features of the church date back to the Romanesque period. In 1046, St. Gellért (Gerard), Bishop of Csanád, was buried there. 14th-century King Sigismund of Hungary initiated its reconstruction in Gothic style. During the reign of King Matthias, two additional lateral aisles were added.

It was used as a mosque when under Ottoman rule and a mihrab from this period is still visible in the south-eastern wall of the sanctuary.

Jesuits ran the church from 1702. After a fire in 1723, the Jesuits restored it between 1725 and 1739 in Baroque style, under the direction of the master builder János György Pauer (1692-1752). When the Jesuits were suppressed in 1773 it returned to the parish. In 1828, István Kultsár (born in 1760), the great Hungarian theater promoter of the Age of Enlightenment, was entombed in the church's vault.

The church was restored several times: by János Hild between 1805 and 1808, Imre Steindl in 1889, and Lászlo Gerő after 1945. The interior murals were restored in 1976–77. In 2010, in the parlor of the sanctuary behind the sanctuary, an Anjou-era (14th-century) fresco of the throne of the Virgin Mary was found, surprisingly intact. The exterior of the church was neglected until the facade was renovated in 2011 after the renovation of the park before it, executed by Hungarian architect Mezős Tamás.

During the archaeological excavations carried out between 2014 and 2016, the camp commander's room was accessed and a sub-church was built. After the renovation, on August 15, 2016, the church was handed over to the faithful and visitors by Cardinal Péter Erdő.

When the Elisabeth Bridge was being rebuilt after destruction during World War II, the Communist government of Hungary sought to demolish the church, but the Church, through negotiation with the Communist authorities, managed to save this historic treasure.

== See also ==
- List of Jesuit sites
