= First Day of the Easter Rising =

Launched the week-long revolution in Dublin, Ireland

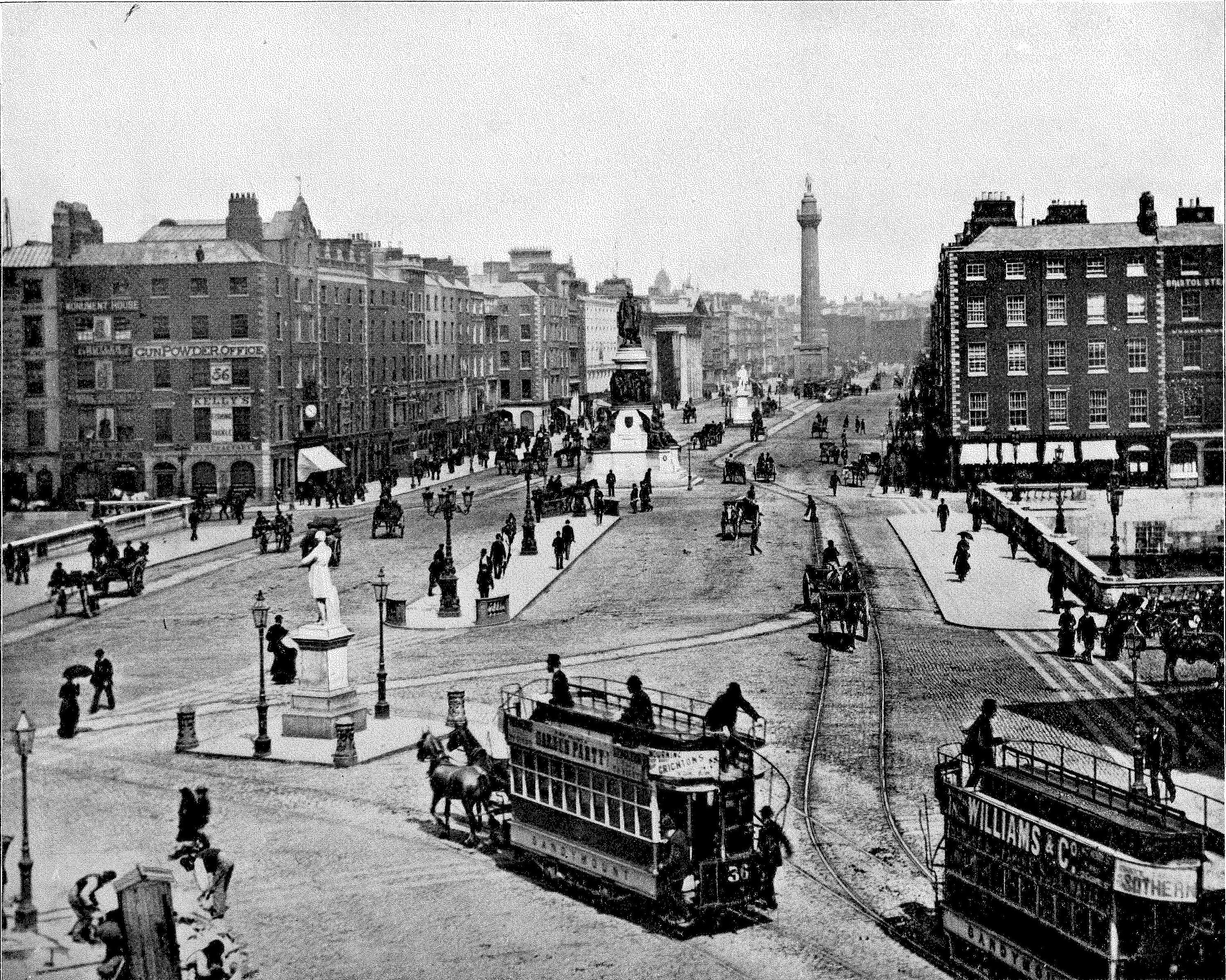
O'Connell Street, as seen from the British outpost in Trinity College. The buildings on either corner were occupied by the rebels. The GPO can be seen in the background, facing Nelson's Pillar

The first day of the Easter Rising, Easter Monday, 24 April 1916, saw some 1,200 volunteer soldiers of the Irish Volunteers take over positions in the centre of Dublin, launching the week-long revolution known as the Easter Rising.

== Volunteer positions ==
The Volunteers' Dublin division was organized into four battalions. As a result of Eoin MacNeill's countermanding order all of them saw a far smaller turnout than originally planned.

The 1st battalion under Commandant Ned Daly mustered at Blackhall Street, numbering about 250 men. They were to occupy the Four Courts and areas to the northwest to guard against attack from the west, principally from the Royal and Marlborough Barracks; the exception was D Company, 1st Battalion, a company of 12 men led by Captain Seán Heuston, who were to occupy the Mendicity Institution, across the river from the Four Courts.

The 2nd battalion comprised about 200 men under Commandant Thomas MacDonagh who gathered at St. Stephen's Green with orders to take Jacob's Biscuit Factory, Bishop Street, south of the city centre, and a smaller number of men who gathered at Fairview, in the northeast, and who were directed to the General Post Office.

In the southeast Commandant Éamon de Valera commanded about 130 men of the 3rd battalion who would take Boland's Bakery and a number of surrounding buildings to cover Beggars Bush Barracks and the main road and railway from Kingstown (now Dún Laoghaire) harbour.

Commandant Éamonn Ceannt's 4th battalion, numbering about 100 men, mustered at Emerald Square in Dolphin's Barn; They were to occupy the workhouse known as the South Dublin Union to the southwest and defend against attack from the Curragh.

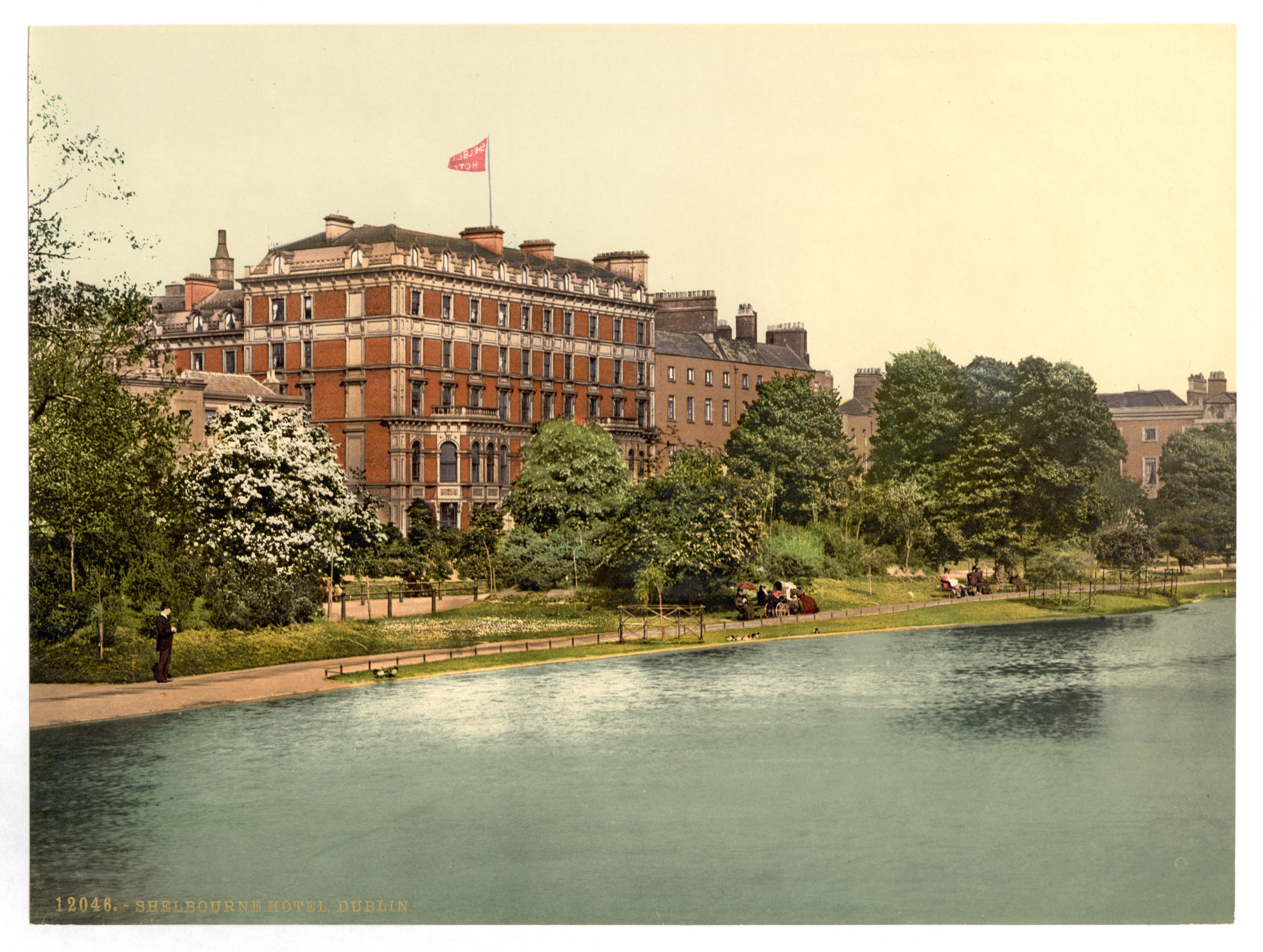
St. Stephen's Green, showing the Shelbourne Hotel.

A joint force of about 400 Volunteers and Citizen Army gathered at Liberty Hall under the command of Commandant James Connolly. Of these, about 100 men and women of the Citizen Army under Commandant Michael Mallin were sent to occupy St. Stephen's Green, and a small detachment of the Citizen Army under Captain Sean Connolly were directed to seize the area around the City Hall, next to Dublin Castle, including the offices of the Daily Express. The remainder was to occupy the General Post Office. This was the headquarters battalion, and as well as Connolly it included four other members of the Military Council: Patrick Pearse, provisional president and commander-in-chief, Tom Clarke, Seán Mac Dermott and Joseph Plunkett.

In at least two incidents, at Jacob's and Stephens Green, the Volunteers and Citizen Army shot civilians who were trying to attack them or dismantle their barricades. Elsewhere, they hit civilians with their rifle butts to drive them off.

At midday, a small team of Volunteers and Fianna members attacked the Magazine Fort in the Phoenix Park and disarmed the guards, with the intent to seize weapons and blow up the building as a signal that the rising had begun. They set explosives but failed to obtain any arms. The explosion was not loud enough to be heard in the city. At the same time the Volunteer and Citizen Army forces throughout the city moved to occupy and secure their positions. Seán Connolly's unit made an assault on Dublin Castle, shooting dead a police sentry and overpowering the soldiers in the guardroom, but did not press home the attack.

== British responses ==
The under-secretary, Sir Matthew Nathan, who was in his office with Colonel Ivor Price, the Military Intelligence Officer, and A. H. Norway, head of the Post Office, was alerted by the shots and helped close the castle gates. The rebels occupied the Dublin City Hall and adjacent buildings. Mallin's detachment, which was joined by Constance Markievicz (Countess Markievicz), occupied St. Stephen's Green, digging trenches and commandeering vehicles to build barricades. They took several buildings, including the Royal College of Surgeons, but did not make an attempt on the Shelbourne Hotel, a tall building overlooking the park.

Daly's men, erecting barricades at the Four Courts, were the first to see action. A troop of the 5th and 12th Lancers, part of the 6th Cavalry Reserve Regiment, was escorting an ammunition convoy along the north Quays when it came under fire from the rebels. Unable to break through, they took refuge in nearby buildings.

One of two flags flown over the GPO during the Rising

The headquarters battalion, led by Connolly, marched the short distance to O'Connell Street. They charged the GPO, expelled customers and staff, and took a number of British soldiers prisoner. Two flags were hoisted on the flag poles on each end of the GPO roof: the tricolour at the right corner at Henry Street and a green flag with the inscription 'Irish Republic' at the left corner at Princess Street. A short time later, Pearse read the Proclamation of the Republic outside the GPO.

The Commander-in-Chief of the British Army in Ireland, General Lovick Friend, was on leave in England. When the insurrection began the Officer Commanding the Dublin Garrison, Colonel Kennard, could not be located. His adjutant, Col. H. V. Cowan, telephoned Marlborough Barracks and asked for a detachment of troops to be sent to Sackville Street (O'Connell Street) to investigate the situation at the GPO. He then telephoned Portobello, Richmond and the Royal Barracks and ordered them to send troops to relieve Dublin Castle. Finally, he contacted the Curragh and asked for reinforcements to be sent to Dublin.

A troop of the 6th Reserve Cavalry Regiment, dispatched from Marlborough Barracks, proceeded down O'Connell Street. As it passed Nelson's Pillar, level with the GPO, the rebels opened fire, killing three cavalrymen and two horses and fatally wounding a fourth man. The cavalry retreated and were withdrawn to barracks. This action is often referred to, inaccurately, as the "Charge of the Lancers."

A piquet from the 3rd (Reserve) Battalion, Royal Irish Regiment (RIR), approaching the city from Richmond Barracks, encountered an outpost of Éamonn Ceannt's force under Section-Commander John Joyce in Mount Brown, at the north-western corner of the South Dublin Union. A party of twenty men under Lieutenant George Malone was ordered to march on to Dublin Castle.

== First combat ==
They proceeded a short distance with rifles sloped and unloaded before coming under fire, losing three men in the first volley, then broke into a tan-yard opposite. Malone's jaw was shattered by a bullet as he went in. The Commanding Officer, Lieutenant-Colonel R. L. Owens, brought up the remainder of his men from Richmond Barracks. A company with a Lewis gun was sent to the Royal Hospital (not then a hospital but the British military headquarters), overlooking the Union. The main body took up positions along the east and south walls of the Union, occupying houses and a block of flats, then opened fire on the rebel positions, forcing Joyce and his men to retreat across open ground. A party led by Lieut. Alan Ramsay broke open a small door next to the Rialto gate, but Ramsay was shot and killed, and the attack was repulsed. A second wave led by Capt. Warmington charged the door but Warmington, too, was killed.

The remaining troops, trying to break in further along the wall, were enfiladed from Jameson's distillery in Marrowbone Lane. Eventually, the superior numbers and firepower of the British were decisive; they forced their way inside and the small rebel force in the tin huts at the eastern end of the Union surrendered.

The first fatality of the engagement was a non-combatant. A nurse, Margaret Keogh, grand-niece of Captain Myles Keogh, responded to the sound of shots. As Keogh attempted to tend to the injured, she was shot dead by a British soldier.
