= List of people associated with the Revolt of the Comuneros =

This is a list of participants and notable figures of the Revolt of the Comuneros, a rebellion from 1520 to 1522 in Castile.

== Royalists ==
The Royalist side fought to uphold the existing government of King Charles I (Carlos I). Along with Charles, the government was led by the regent,

- Cardinal Adrian of Utrecht (Adriano de Utrecht).

Charles's departure for Germany to take up his recently acquired position as Emperor Charles V of the Holy Roman Empire (there were four Charles before him as Holy Roman Emperor but none as King of Castile and Aragon) helped provoke the revolt. He was seen as having broken his promise to leave a Castilian in charge of the country since Adrian was Flemish.

Despite being in Germany for the duration of the revolt, Charles played an important role in quelling it via communication and orders to Regent Adrian. One of the most influential decisions Charles made was to appoint two new Spanish co-regents to govern Castile:

- the Constable of Castile, Íñigo Fernández, and
- the Admiral of Castile, Fadrique Enríquez.

=== Royal Council and Advisers ===
The Royal Council had functionally run the country during the period following King Philip I. However, it was not well regarded among the common people since the government often ineffectively stood by while nobles illegally expanded their domain through threats of force. Corruption ran rampant, and the government fell into debt. The Council's President, Antonio de Rojas Manrique, was widely hated.

Still, disrespect of the Royal Council paled next to the distaste of the retinue of Flemish advisers that Charles brought with him into Spain.
William de Croÿ, sieur de Chièvres (Guillermo de Croÿ, señor de Chièvres) had managed much of Charles's upbringing in Flanders and had not taught him overly much statecraft. By doing so, he forced Charles to rely on him for advice. Many of the Flemish advisers proceeded to enrich themselves with funds from the Castilian treasury. William de Croÿ became Treasurer of Castile, a position which he later sold to Alvaro de Zúñiga, duke of Béjar, for 30,000 ducats. William had full control over who was appointed to administrative positions to Spain's fledgling colonies in the West Indies, and appointed friends of his to high positions, like Jan de Witte as Bishop of Cuba . He promised rich fiefs to Laurent de Gorrevot, another prominent Flemish adviser, in Cuba and the Yucutan (later annulled), and permitted him the right to import 4,000 African slaves to the Indies, which Gorrevot sold to a syndicate for 25,000 ducats. William also managed to get his 20-year-old nephew (named William de Croÿ as well) appointed Archbishop of Toledo, an extremely-unpopular act of nepotism.

Jean Le Sauvage served as chancellor and controversially presided over the Cortes of Valladolid in 1518. Le Sauvage obtained in December 1517 the right to collect duties on the export of almonds and dried fruits, a position formerly held by the ruler of Granada. Le Sauvage leased the privilege to Fernando de Córdoba for nine years for 168,000 ducats.

=== Military commanders ===
- Rodrigo Ronquillo, who led the ill-fated expedition to Segovia to punish the murder of the legislator who had voted for the king's tax at the Cortes of Corunna.
- Antonio de Fonseca, the captain-general of the Castilian army who went to Medina del Campo to seize the royal artillery but was driven off by the civilians.
- Antonio de Zúñiga, the prior of the Order of St. John.

== Comuneros ==
The comuneros were the rebels who tried to overthrow the Royal Council and set up their own government. Their firmest base of support was the middle and the upper-middle classes. The monied elite had been treated well under the regime of Ferdinand and Isabella but then saw its standing decay under the Royal Council to the most powerful nobles. Some nobles, especially "low" ones, threw their lot in as well since they were jealous of the foreigners who occupied many of the prestigious positions of government under Charles. The rural peasants generally had conflicted loyalties.

In the second phase of the rebellion, the revolt took a strongly antiseigneurial turn under Bishop Antonio de Acuña and others. That helped make the peasants more supportive to the cause of the comuneros' but repelled powerful nobles, who worried about their privileges.

=== Nobles and knights ===
- Pedro de Girón, a Castilian noble. He rose to prominence in the junta and eventually became a captain of the army.
- Pedro López de Ayala, Count of Salvatierra and a Captain of the comunero army.
- Ramiro Núñez de Guzmán, a city councilman, and Lord of Porma and the village of Toral.
- Pedro Maldonado, heir to the Casa de las Conchas of Salamanca and Captain of the army.
- María Pacheco, a Castilian noble. She ran the town of Toledo in the absence of her husband, Juan de Padilla, and after his death, she became the leader of what remained of the revolt.
- Luis de Quintanilla, an army captain.
- Juan de Mendoza, a noble lord of Cubas and Griñón.
- Juan de Padilla, a Castilian noble and overall commander of the Comunero army.
- Juan Bravo, a Castilian noble.
- Francisco Maldonado, a Castilian noble.
- Pedro Laso de la Vega, a prominent town councilor in Toledo and a moderate who opposed the later turn of the revolt against the nobles.

=== Commoners ===
- Luis de Cuéllar, an exporter and merchant.
- Antonio Suárez, a wool merchant.
- Antonio de Aguilar, an apothecary.
- Gonzalo de Ayora, an official historian.
- Bernaldino de los Ríos, a judge.
- Alonso de Zúñiga, a professor.
- Alonso de Arreo, a city councilman and lawyer of Navalcarnero.

=== Clerics ===
- Antonio de Acuña, Bishop of Zamora and a captain of the army.
- Juan de Bilbao, a Franciscan and one of the theorists and initiators of the movement.
- Alonso de Medina, a Dominican.
- Alonso de Bustillo, a Dominican and the head of the theology department at the seminary in Valladolid.

== Others ==
- Queen Joanna the Mad (Juana la Loca). The rebels proclaimed that she had recovered her senses and was now ready to rule. Historical sources are split on whether there was truly much of a recovery. The American historian Stephen Haliczer believes there was one, but if anything, it failed to help the comuneros. She learned of the anti-Charles rhetoric and refused to go along with it. Joanna refused to sign any edicts or lend much presence to the comuneros, whether from incapacity or disagreement. When Tordesillas fell, she was said to be happy. All that she had wanted was attention, which she was finally receiving.
- Pope Leo X was seen as compliant to many of Charles' wishes. When Charles raised the tax on ecclesiastical holdings in Spain in 1517, the Spanish church, at first, protested vigorously. Charles prevailed upon Leo X to grant his blessing upon the tax. While much of the Spanish church was supported the comuneros during the revolt, Leo X failed to give much guidance and discretely supported Charles. Branches of the church with strong foreign connections tended to be more strongly royalist (such as the Knights of St. John).
