= Convento de San Antonio de Padua, Toledo =

Convent in Castile-La Mancha, Spain

Coordinates: 39.8563°N 4.0293°W

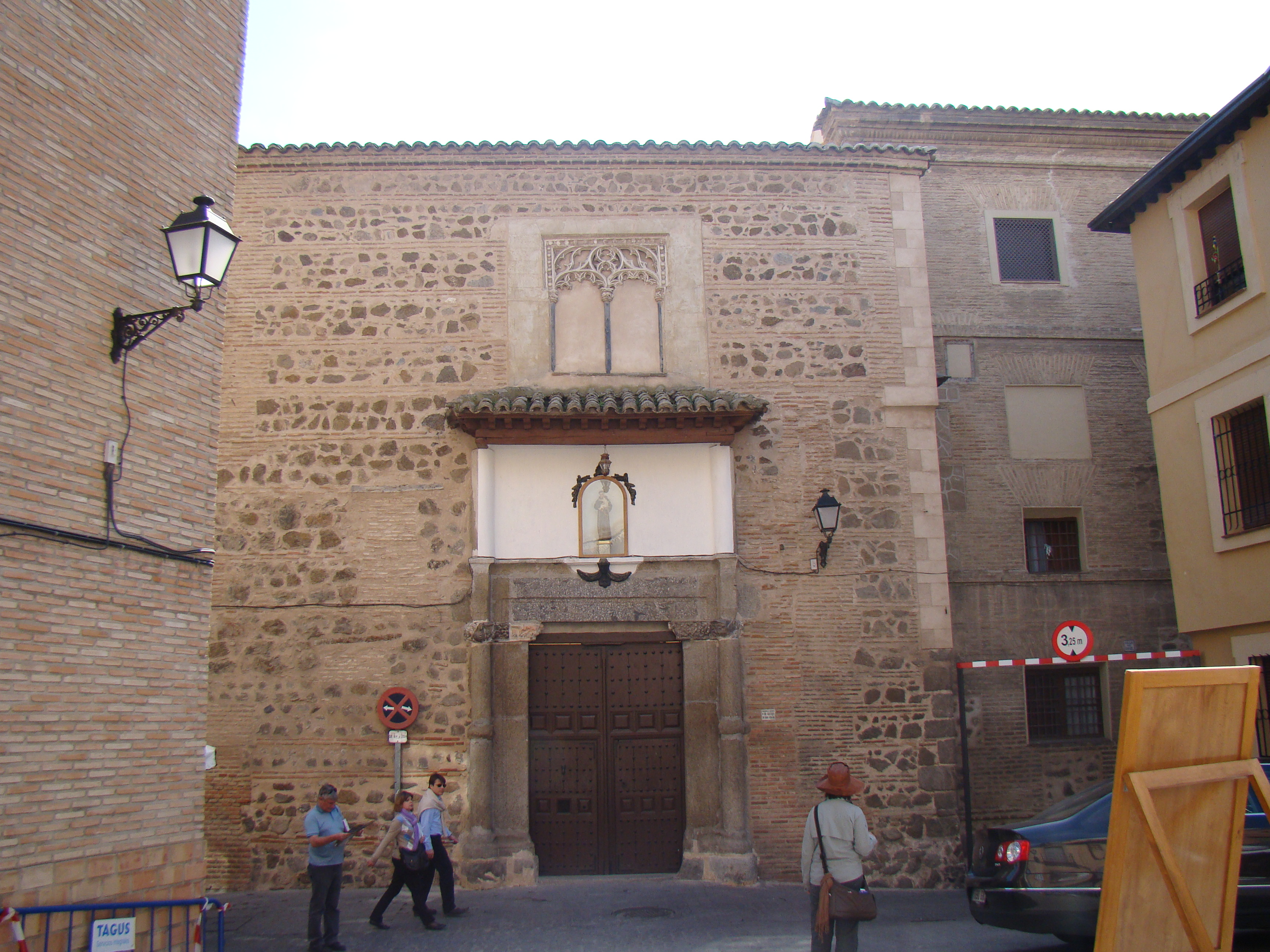
Facade

The Convento de San Antonio de Padua is a Franciscan convent located in Toledo, Castile-La Mancha, Spain. Dedicated to St Anthony of Padua, the institution was created in 1525 in the former palace of the advisor comunero Don Fernando de Ávalos, confiscated by order of Charles V, Holy Roman Emperor because its owner was a comunero. The entrance is Gothic-Mudéjar of the 15th century.

The church was designed by Juan Bautista Monegro. The chapter house and the choir, of the same period, conserves a floor of azulejos. Its main altar has an 18th-century Baroque altarpiece. In the side chapels are located the sepulchers of its founders, the De la Fuente family.
