= Arco de Santa María =

One of the twelve medieval gates in Burgos, Spain

Coordinates: 42°20′23″N 3°42′14″W

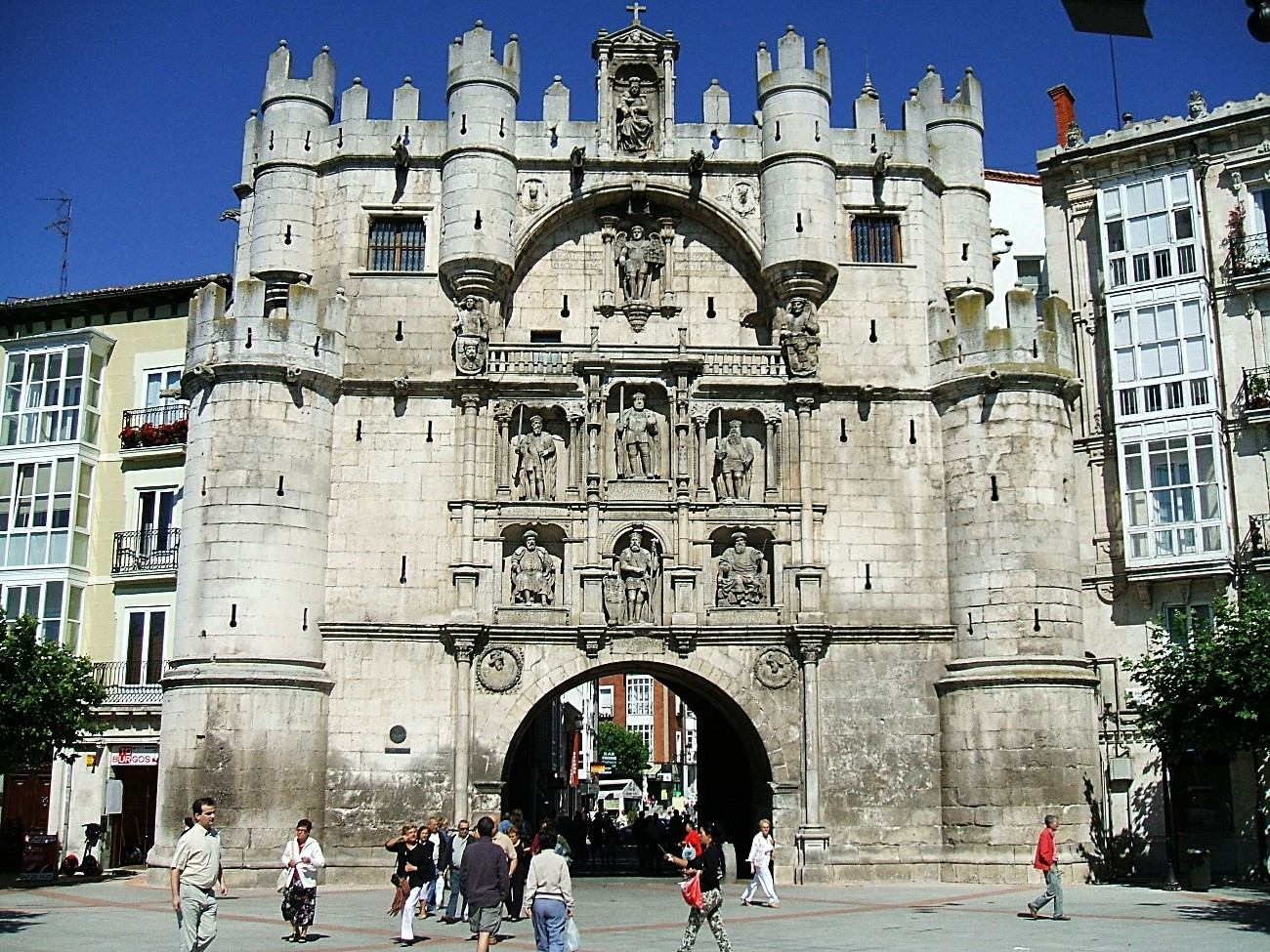
Arco de Santa María, Burgos

Arco de Santa María in Burgos, Spain, is one of the twelve gates the city had during the Middle Ages. It was rebuilt by Charles V, Holy Roman Emperor during the 16th century after the local rulers of the city supported him during the Revolt of the Comuneros. On the facade of the gatehouse appear statues of real or legendary people of importance to the city of Burgos and to Castile, namely Count Fernán González (c. 910-970) and El Cid flanking Charles V (upper level), and the mythical 9th-century Castilian judges or "Jueces de Castilla", Laín Calvo and Nuño Rasura, by tradition forefathers of El Cid and Fernán González, respectively, flanking Count Diego Rodríguez Porcelos, the founder of the city in 884.

The interior of the gatehouse is open to the public and hosts temporary art displays, a large mural by Burgos artist José Vela Zanetti and an exhibition of old pharmaceutical equipment.

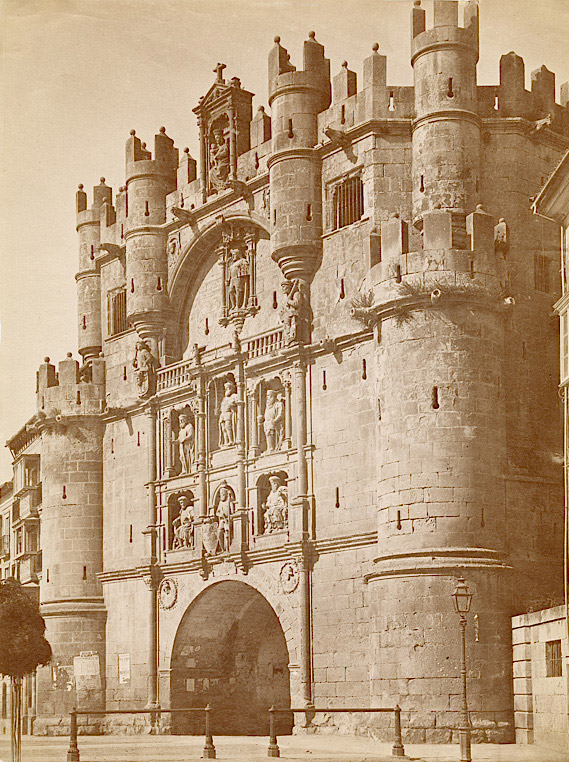
Arco de Santa Maria, Burgos by Juan Laurent, c. 1863, Department of Image Collections, National Gallery of Art Library, Washington, DC

It was added to the list of National Monuments in 1943.
