= Juan Zapata =

Juan Zapata may refer to:

- Juan de Zapata (fl. 1520s), Spanish rebel
- Juan de Zapata y Sandoval (1545–1630), Mexican bishop
- Juan C. Zapata (born 1966), American businessman and politician
- Juan Ramón Zapata (born 1974), Spanish racing driver
- Juan Zapata (footballer, born 1994), Colombian footballer for Inter de Barinas
- Juan Zapata (footballer, born 2000), Colombian footballer for Atlas F.C.
