= Peñaflor Castle =

Coordinates: 39.6670°N 4.2203°W

Peñaflor castle is a castle located in the municipality of Cuerva, Castile-La Mancha, Spain.

== History ==
Peñaflor castle was most likely built under the reign of Alfonso X of Castile in the 13th century. It was acquired by an individual with the surname Guevara from Henry IV in the 15th century. Later it was sold to Garcilaso de la Vega, father of the poet of the same name, and was inherited by his eldest son, Pedro Laso de la Vega, who lived in Cuerva. By the end of the 16th century the castle had deteriorated and was abandoned.
