= Rodrigo Ronquillo =

Mayor of Zamora

Personal details
- Born: Rodrigo Ronquillo y Briceño; 1471 Arévalo, Aldeaseca, Ávila, Spain
- Died: 9 December 1552 (aged 80–81) Madrid, Spain
- Spouse: Teresa Briceño
- Children: Gonzalo Ronquillo; Luis Ronquillo; Catalina Ronquillo; Francisca Ronquillo
- Relatives: Ruy González Briceño
- Occupation: Military and noble

Military service
- Battles/wars: Revolt of the Comuneros; Battle of Villalar

Rodrigo Ronquillo y Briceño (1471 - 9 December 1552) was a Spanish military and noble known for his intervention at the Revolt of the Comuneros, fighting with the royalists. During the revolt in 1520, Rodrigo Ronquillo, chief of royal troops in the area, set his headquarters in Santa María la Real de Nieva, and lost a battle near the town.

He was born in 1471 and died in Madrid on 9 December 1552.
