= Revolt of the Comuneros =

1520–1521 rebellion in Castile, Spain

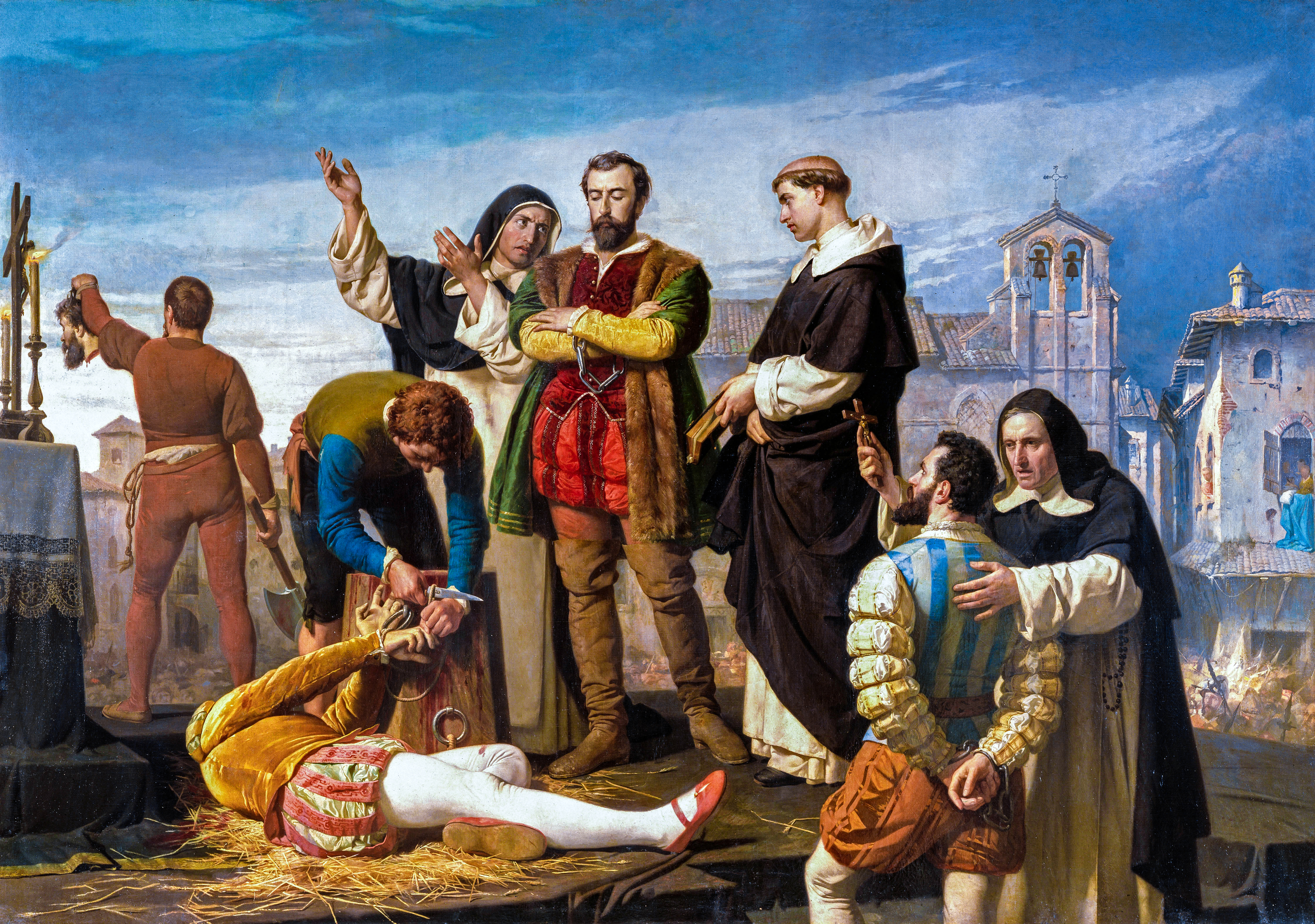
- Execution of the Comuneros of Castile, by Antonio Gisbert (1860)
Date	16 April 1520 – 25 October 1521^{1}
Location	Crown of Castile
Result	Royalist victory

Belligerents
Comuneros rebels	Royalist Castilians

Commanders and leaders
Juan López de Padilla (executed); Juan Bravo (executed); Francisco Maldonado (executed); María Pacheco; Antonio de Acuña (executed); Pedro Girón	Charles V, Holy Roman Emperor; Adrian of Utrecht (Regent of Castile); Íñigo Fernández (Constable of Castile); Fadrique Enríquez (Admiral of Castile)
- ^{1}3 February 1522 is also used as an end date; see 1522 revolt.

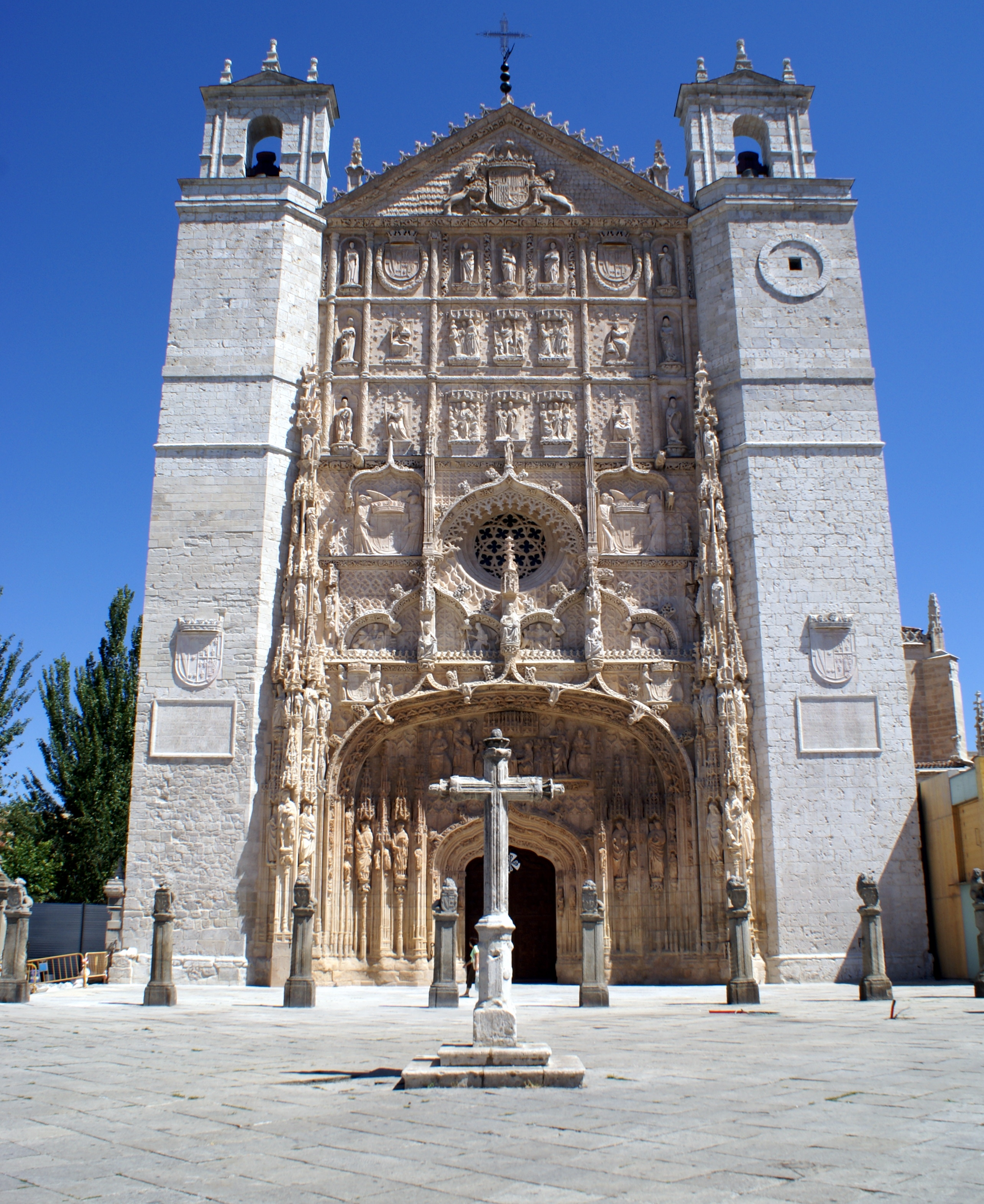
San Pablo Church in Valladolid, seat of a Cortes held in 1518. Protests emerged when the Flemish adviser Jean de Sauvage was named its president, presaging later troubles.

The Revolt of the Comuneros (Spanish: Guerra de las Comunidades de Castilla, "War of the Communities of Castile") was an uprising by citizens of Castile against the rule of Charles I and his administration between 1520 and 1521. At its height, the rebels controlled the heart of Castile, ruling the cities of Valladolid, Tordesillas, and Toledo.

The revolt occurred in the wake of political instability in the Crown of Castile after the death of Queen Isabella I in 1504. Isabella's daughter Joanna succeeded to the throne. Due to Joanna's mental instability, Castile was ruled by the nobles and her father, King Ferdinand II of Aragon, as a regent, while Joanna was confined. After Ferdinand's death in 1516, Joanna's sixteen-year-old son Charles was proclaimed her co-monarch of both Castile and Aragon; while Joanna also succeeded as Queen of Aragon, during her co-regency with her own son, she remained confined.

Charles had been raised in the Netherlands with little knowledge of Castilian. He arrived in Spain in October 1517 accompanied by a large retinue of Flemish nobles and clerics. These factors resulted in mistrust between the new king and the Castilian social elites, who could see the threat to their power and status.

In 1519, Charles was elected Holy Roman Emperor. He departed for Germany in 1520, leaving the Dutch cardinal Adrian of Utrecht to rule Castile in his absence. Soon, a series of anti-government riots broke out in the cities, and local city councils (Comunidades) took power. The rebels chose Charles' own mother, Queen Joanna, as an alternative ruler, hoping they could control her madness. The rebel movement took on a radical anti-feudal dimension, supporting peasant rebellions against the landed nobility. On 23 April 1521, after nearly a year of rebellion, the reorganized supporters of the emperor struck a crippling blow to the comuneros at the Battle of Villalar. The following day, rebel leaders Juan López de Padilla, Juan Bravo, and Francisco Maldonado were beheaded. The army of the comuneros fell apart. Only the city of Toledo kept alive the rebellion led by María Pacheco, until its surrender in October 1521.

The character of the revolution is a matter of historiographical debate. According to some scholars, the revolt was one of the first modern revolutions, notably because of the anti-noble sentiment against social injustice and its basis on ideals of democracy and freedom. Others consider it a more typical rebellion against high taxes and perceived foreign control. From the 19th century onwards, the revolt has been mythologized by various Spaniards, generally liberals who drew political inspiration from it. Conservative intellectuals have traditionally adopted more pro-Imperial stances toward the revolt, and have been critical of both the motives and the government of the comuneros. With the end of Franco's dictatorship and the establishment of the autonomous community of Castile and León, positive commemoration of the Comunidades has grown. 23 April is now celebrated as Castile and León Day, and the incident is often referred to in Castilian nationalism.

== Origins ==
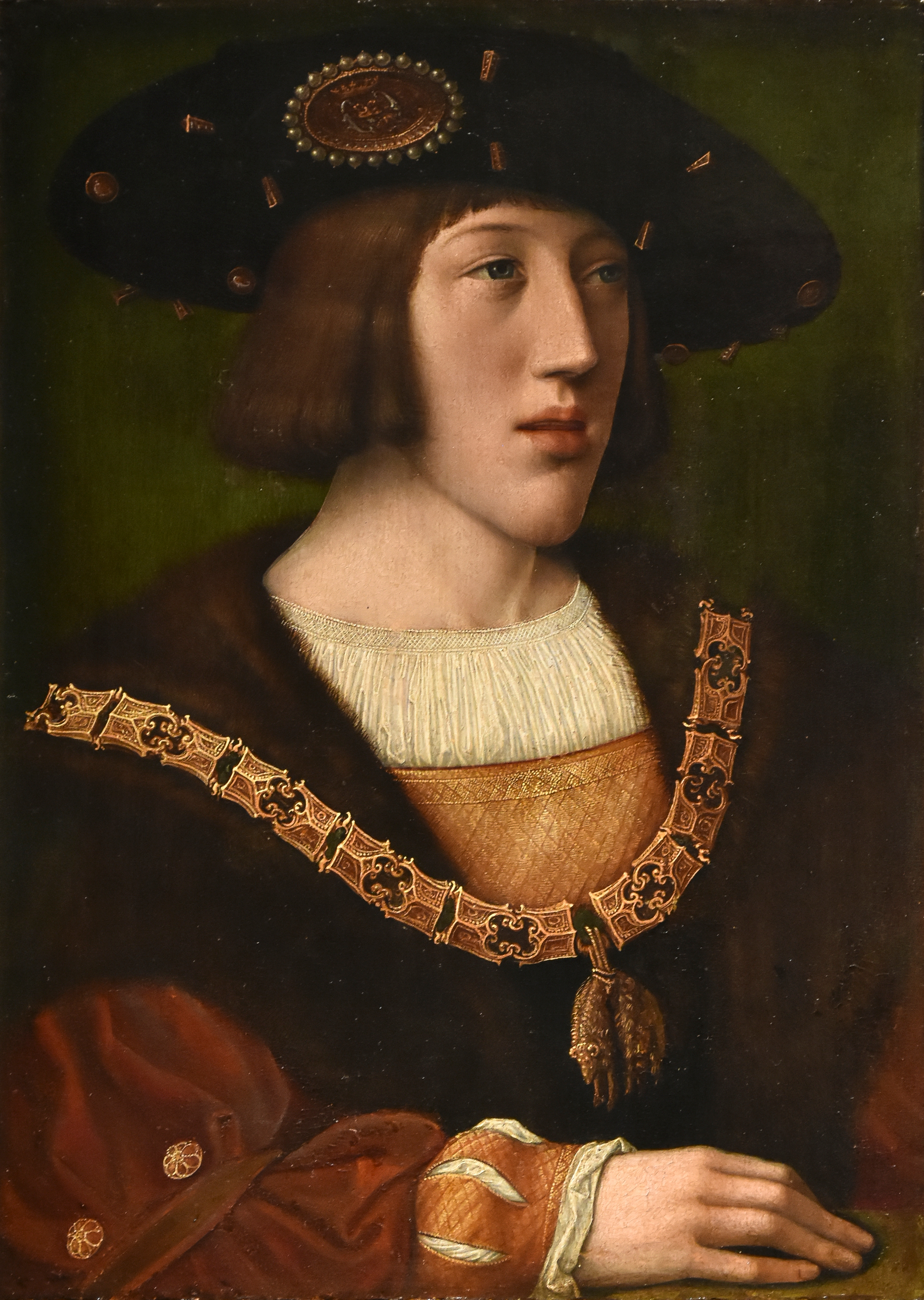
A 1516 portrait of King Charles I of Castile and Aragon, later Holy Roman Emperor Charles V, by Bernard van Orley. Charles would rule one of the largest empires in European history—through his father Philip, Burgundy and the Netherlands; through his mother Joanna, Castile, Aragon, and Naples; and through his grandfather Maximilian and his election in 1519 as Holy Roman Emperor, Germany, Austria, and much of Northern Italy.

Discontent had been brewing for years before the Revolt of the Comuneros. The second half of the 15th century saw profound political, economic, and social changes in Spain. Economic growth created new urban industries and offered a route to power and wealth not tied to the aristocracy. Support from these urban elites was critical to Ferdinand and Isabella's centralization of power, and they acted as a counterweight to the landed aristocracy and the clergy.

However, with Isabella I's death and Joanna's accession in 1504, this alliance between the national government and the budding middle class faltered. The Castilian government decayed with each successive administration, becoming rife with corruption. Joanna's husband, Philip I, reigned briefly; he was replaced by Archbishop Cisneros as regent for a short time, and then by Isabella's widower Ferdinand who ruled from Aragon. Ferdinand's claim to continue ruling Castile as regent was somewhat tenuous after Isabella's death, but no plausible alternatives existed as the sovereign, their widowed daughter Joanna, was mentally unfit to reign on her own. The landed nobility of Castile took advantage of the weak and corrupt Royal Council to illegally expand their territory and domain with private armies while the government did nothing. In response, the towns signed mutual defense pacts, relying on each other rather than the national government.

The budgets of both Castile and Aragon had been in poor condition for some time. The government had expelled the Jews in 1492 and the Muslims of Granada in 1502, moves that undercut lucrative trades and businesses. Ferdinand and Isabella had been forced to borrow money to pay troops during and after the Reconquista, and Spanish military obligations had only increased since then. A large number of troops were required to maintain stability in recently conquered Granada, threatened by revolt from the maltreated moriscos (former Muslims who had converted to Christianity) and frequent naval raids from Muslim nations along the Mediterranean. Additionally, Ferdinand had invaded and occupied the Iberian part of Navarre in 1512, and forces were required to garrison it against Navarrese revolts and French armies. Very little money was left to pay for the royal army in Castile proper, let alone service foreign debts. The corruption in the government since Isabella's death only made the budget shortfalls worse.

=== Succession of Charles ===
In 1516, Ferdinand died. The remaining heir was Ferdinand and Isabella's grandson Charles, who became King Charles I of both Castile and Aragon in coregency with his mother Queen Joanna I of Castile. Joanna, who had been confined in Tordesillas, also succeeded as Queen of Aragon, but during the coregency with her own son, she remained confined and largely powerless.

Charles was brought up in Flanders, the homeland of his father Philip, and barely knew Castilian. The people greeted him with skepticism, but also hoped he would restore stability. With the arrival of the new king in late 1517, his Flemish court took positions of power in Castile; young Charles only trusted people he knew from the Netherlands. Among the most scandalous of these was the appointment of the twenty-year-old William de Croÿ as Archbishop of Toledo. The Archbishopric was an important position; it had been held by Archbishop Cisneros, the former regent of the country. Six months into his rule, discontent openly simmered among rich and poor alike. Even some monks began to agitate, denouncing the opulence of the royal court, the Flemish, and the nobility in their sermons. One of the first public protests involved placards posted in churches, which read:

You, land of Castile, very wretched and damned are you to suffer that as noble a kingdom as you are, you will be governed by those who have no love for you.

With the unrest growing, Charles' paternal grandfather Holy Roman Emperor Maximilian I died in 1519. A new election had to be held to choose the next emperor. Charles campaigned aggressively for the post, vying with King Francis I of France to bribe the most prince-electors. Charles I won the election, becoming Emperor Charles V and cementing the power of the House of Habsburg. He prepared to head to Germany to take possession of his new domains in the Holy Roman Empire.

=== New taxes: The Cortes of Santiago and Corunna ===
Charles had already stressed the treasury to its limit with his extravagant Flemish court, and over 1 million florins were spent in bribes for the election. Taxes (Note: This article uses the term "tax" to encompass a variety of revenue-raising methods the government used. Briefly, servicios were flat monetary grants paid to the treasury; the encabezamiento was a portion of the sales tax towns collected sent to the government; and the cruzada ("crusade") was a special and semi-voluntary contribution that counted as an indulgence and was generally used for war against the Muslims. Charles wanted to abolish the lenient encabezamiento and return to an older and harsher system of direct royal control of tolls, pasturage fees, and the like. He also requested large servicios at the Cortes he held. Part of the revenue problem the government had was that income from the cruzada had fallen greatly since the Reconquista had finished in 1492.) had to be raised to cover the debt, but any new taxes had to be approved by the Cortes, Castile's parliamentary body. Thus, in late March 1520, Charles convened the Cortes in Santiago de Compostela. Charles ensured the Cortes would only have limited power, and further attempted to stack the Cortes with pliable representatives he could bribe. Support for the opposition only increased in response, and the representatives demanded that their grievances be heard first before any new tax was granted.

A group of clerics soon circulated a statement in protest of the king. It argued three points: any new taxes should be rejected; Castile should be embraced and the foreign Empire rejected; and if the king did not take into account his subjects, the Comunidades themselves should defend the interests of the kingdom. It was the first time where the word comunidades (communities, communes) was used to signify the independent populace, and the name would stick to the councils later formed.

At this point, most of the members of the Cortes in Santiago intended to vote against the king's requested duties and taxes, even with the Cortes stacked with royalists. In response, Charles decided to suspend the Cortes on 4 April. He convened them again in Corunna on 22 April, this time getting his program passed. On 20 May, he embarked for Germany, and left as regent of his Spanish possessions his former tutor, Adrian of Utrecht (better known as the future Pope Adrian VI).

== Beginnings of the Revolt ==
=== Rebelliousness in Toledo ===
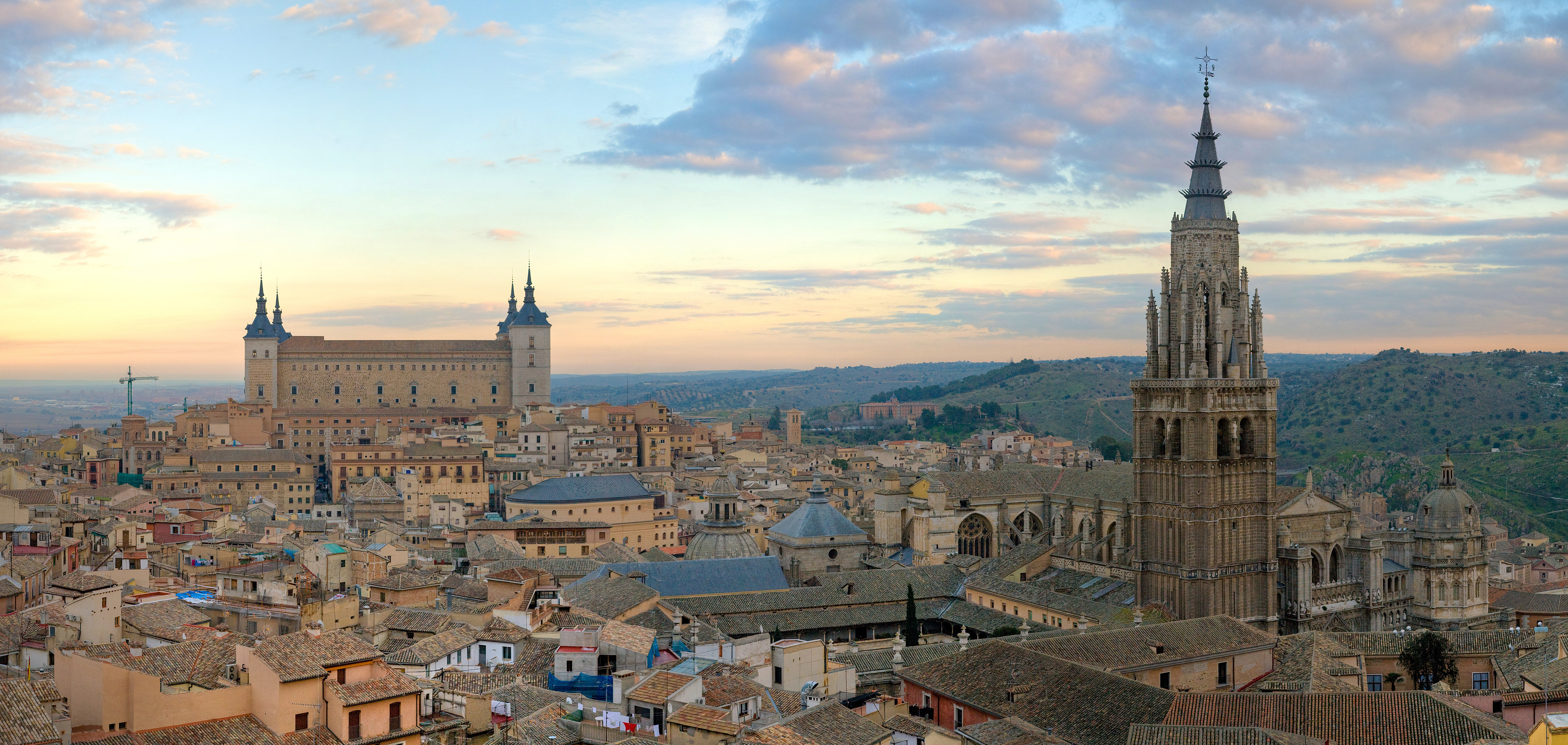
Toledo, home of the first Comunidad

In April 1520, Toledo was already unstable. The city council had been at the forefront of protests against Charles' bid to become Holy Roman Emperor. They decried the short-term expenses that would be borne by Castile and questioned the role of Castile in this new political framework, given the possibility that the land would become a mere imperial province. The situation erupted when the royal government summoned the most radical of the city councilors away from the city, intending to send back more easily controllable replacements on a royal salary. The order came on 15 April; one day later, as the councilors prepared to leave, a large crowd opposed to the departure rioted and drove out the royal administrators instead. A citizen's committee was elected under the leadership of Juan López de Padilla and Pedro Laso de la Vega, naming themselves a Comunidad. On 21 April, the remaining administrators were driven from the fortifications of the Alcázar of Toledo.

Following Charles' departure to Germany, the riots multiplied in the cities of central Castile, especially after the arrival of legislators who had voted "yes" to the taxes Charles had asked for. Segovia had some of the earliest and most violent incidents; on 30 May, a mob of woolworkers murdered two administrators and the city's legislator who had voted in favor. Incidents of a similar size occurred in cities such as Burgos and Guadalajara, while others, such as León, Ávila, and Zamora, suffered minor altercations.

=== Proposals to other cities ===
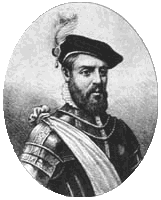
Juan López de Padilla, leader of the Comunidad of Toledo

With widespread discontent circulating, on 8 June Toledo's council suggested to cities with a vote in the Cortes to hold an emergency meeting. They proffered five goals:

- Cancel the taxes voted in the Cortes of Corunna.
- A return to the local-controlled encabezamiento system of taxation.
- Reserve official positions and church benefices for Castilians.
- Prohibit money from leaving the kingdom to fund foreign affairs.
- Designate a Castilian to lead the kingdom in the absence of the king.

These claims, especially the first two, spread quickly through society. Ideas began to circulate of replacing the king; Toledo's leaders floated the possibility of turning the cities of Castile into independent free cities, similar to Genoa and other Italian republics. Competing proposals suggested keeping the monarchy, but dethroning Charles. They proposed that he be replaced by either his mother Queen Joanna or his Castilian-born brother Ferdinand. With these ideas, the revolt shifted from a simple protest against taxes to a broader revolution. Many cities, while not quite in outright revolt, stopped sending taxes to the Royal Council and began to self-govern.

== Expansion of the Revolt ==
=== Blockade of Segovia ===
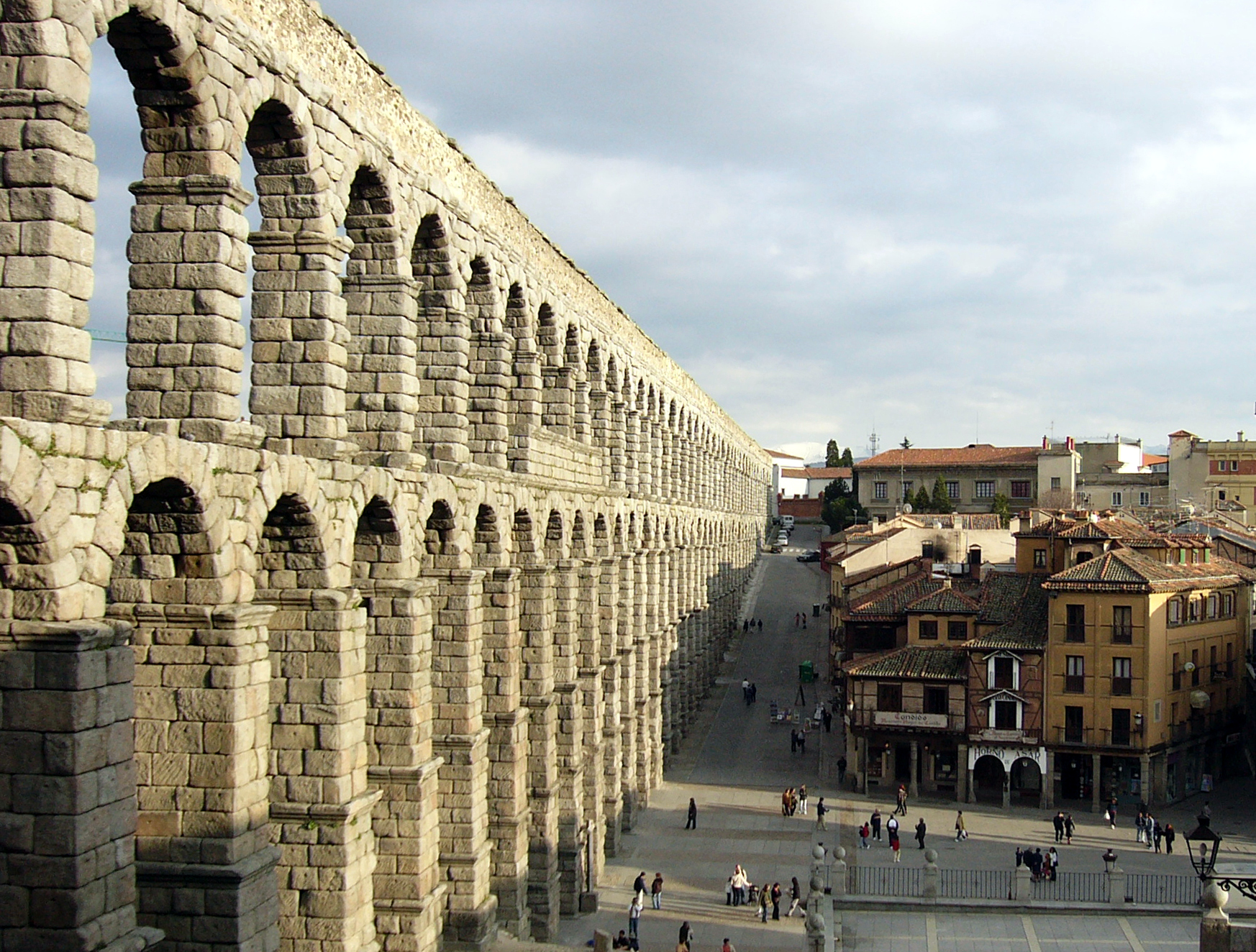
Segovia, the city of the first armed clash between the comuneros and the royalists

The situation moved closer to armed conflict on 10 June. Rodrigo Ronquillo had been sent to Segovia by the Royal Council to investigate the recent murder of Segovia's legislator, but Segovia refused him entry. Unable to besiege a city of 30,000 with only a small force, Ronquillo instead set out to blockade foodstuffs and other supplies from entering Segovia. The people of Segovia, led by militia leader and noble Juan Bravo, rallied around the Comunidad. Segovia requested aid against Ronquillo's army from the Comunidades of Toledo and Madrid. The cities responded by sending their militias, captained by Juan López de Padilla and Juan de Zapata, who won in the first major confrontation between the forces of the king and the rebels.

=== Junta of Ávila ===
Other cities now followed the lead of Toledo and Segovia, deposing their governments. A revolutionary Cortes, La Santa Junta de las Comunidades ("Holy Assembly of the Communities"), (Note: Junta, meaning "Congress" or "Assembly," did not yet have the negative connotation of "Oligarchical military dictatorship" in the 16th century.) held its first session in Ávila and declared itself the legitimate government deposing the Royal Council. Padilla was named Captain-General, and troops were assembled. Still, only four cities sent representatives at first: Toledo, Segovia, Salamanca, and Toro.

=== Burning of Medina del Campo ===
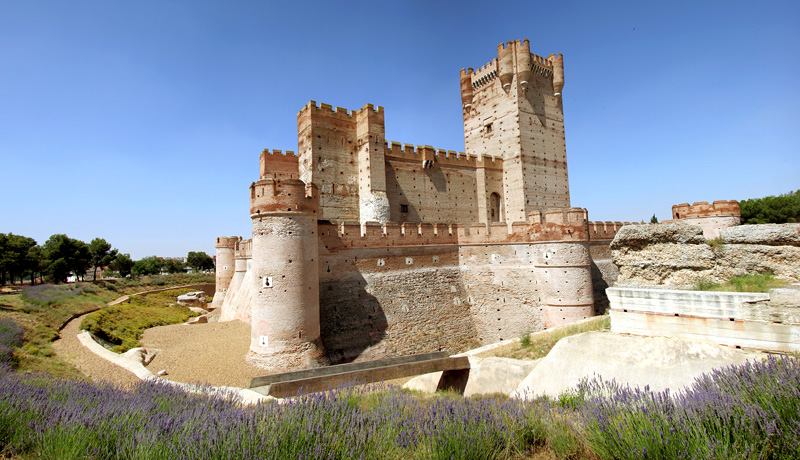
The Castillo de la Mota of Medina del Campo

Faced with the situation in Segovia, Regent and Cardinal Adrian of Utrecht decided to use the royal artillery, located in nearby Medina del Campo, to take Segovia and defeat Padilla. Adrian ordered his commander Antonio de Fonseca to seize the artillery. Fonseca arrived on 21 August in Medina, but encountered heavy resistance from the townspeople, as the city had strong trade links to Segovia. Fonseca ordered the setting of a fire to distract the resistance, but it grew out of control. Much of the town was destroyed, including a Franciscan monastery and a trade warehouse containing goods valued at more than 400,000 ducats. Fonseca had to withdraw his troops, and the event was a public relations disaster for the government. Uprisings throughout Castile occurred, even in cities that previously had been neutral such as Castile's capital, Valladolid. The establishment of the Comunidad of Valladolid caused the most important core of the Iberian plateau to declare for the rebels, upending the stability of the government. New members now joined the Junta of Ávila and the Royal Council looked discredited; Adrian had to flee to Medina de Rioseco as Valladolid fell. The royal army, with many of its soldiers unpaid for months, started to disintegrate.

=== Junta of Tordesillas ===
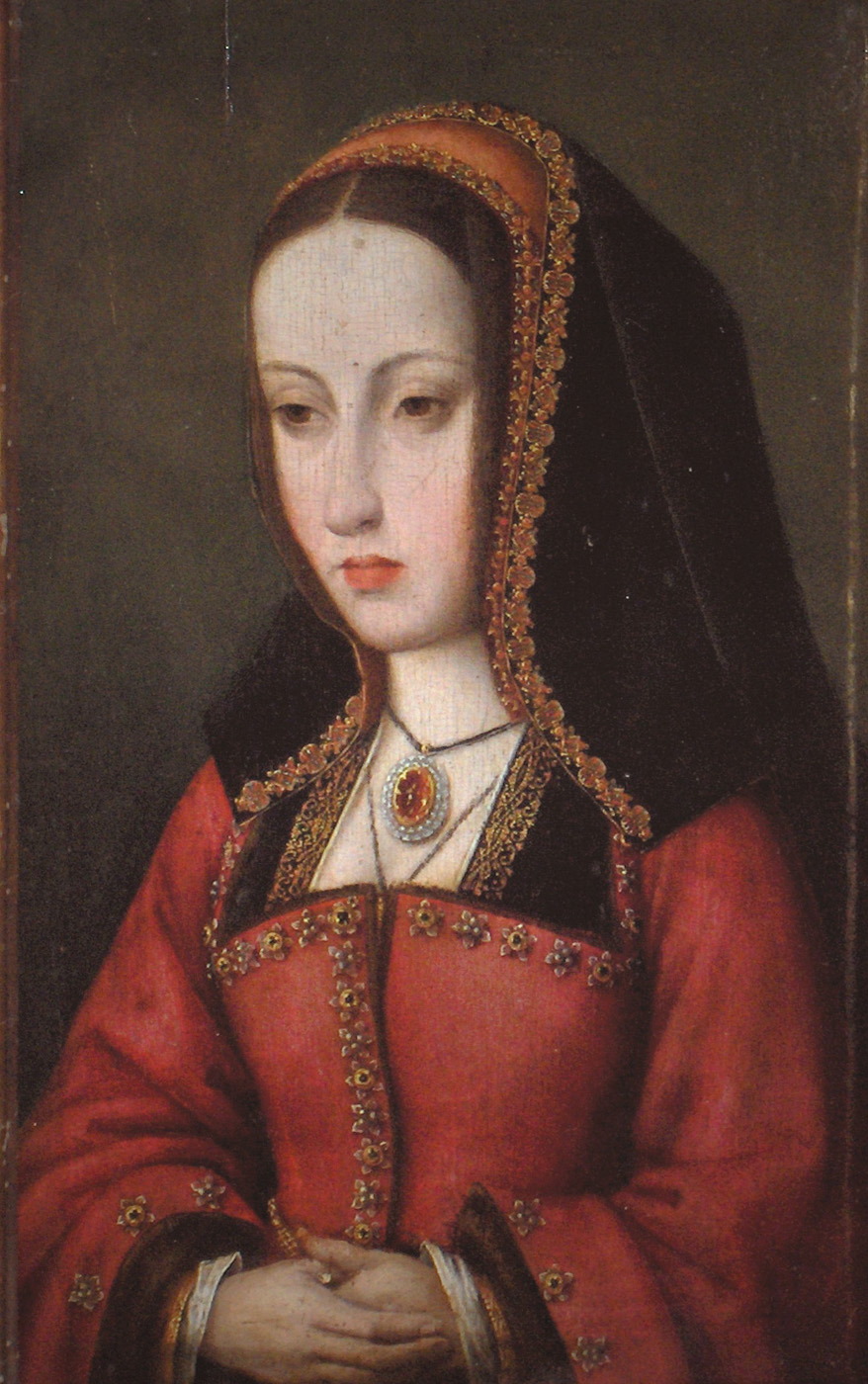
Joanna the Mad, officially the Queen and co-regent of Castile with her son Charles, actually had no power whatsoever

The comunero army now properly organized itself, integrating the militias of Toledo, Madrid, and Segovia. Once told of Fonseca's attack, the comunero forces went to Medina del Campo and took possession of the artillery that had just been denied to Fonseca's troops. On 29 August, the comuneros' army arrived at Tordesillas with the goal of declaring Queen Joanna the sole sovereign. The Junta moved from Ávila to Tordesillas at the Queen's request and invited cities that had not yet sent representatives to do so. A total of thirteen cities were represented in the Junta of Tordesillas: Burgos, Soria, Segovia, Ávila, Valladolid, León, Salamanca, Zamora, Toro, Toledo, Cuenca, Guadalajara, and Madrid. The only invited cities that failed to attend were the four Andalusian cities: Seville, Granada, Cordova, and Jaén. Since most of the kingdom was represented at Tordesillas, the Junta renamed itself the Cortes y Junta General del Reino ("General Assembly of the Kingdom"). On 24 September 1520, the mad Queen, for the only time, presided over the Cortes.

The legislators met with Queen Joanna and explained the purpose of the Cortes: to proclaim her sovereignty and restore lost stability to the kingdom. The next day, 25 September, the Cortes issued a declaration pledging to use arms if necessary and for the whole to aid any one city that was threatened. On 26 September, the Cortes of Tordesillas declared itself the new legitimate government and denounced the Royal Council. Oaths of self-defense were taken by all the cities represented over the week, finishing by 30 September. The revolutionary government now had structure and a free hand to act, with the Royal Council still ineffective and confused.

=== Scope of the rebellion ===
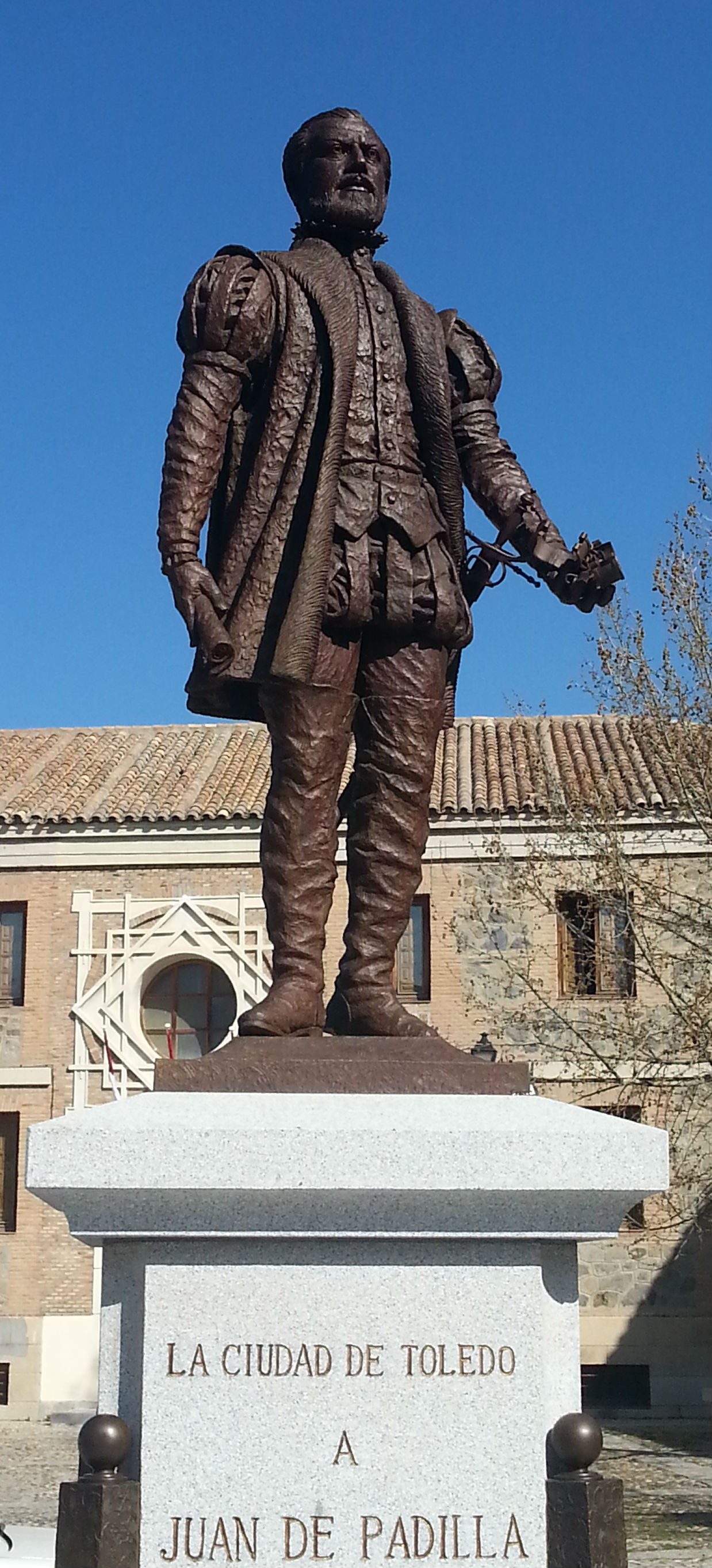
Bronze sculpture of Juan de Padilla in Toledo

The comuneros were strong in the central plateau of the Iberian Peninsula, as well as scattered other places such as Murcia. The rebels sought to propound their revolutionary ideas to the rest of the kingdom, but without much success. There were few attempts at rebellion elsewhere, such as in Galicia to the northwest or in Andalusia to the south. Comunidades in the south were set up in Jaén, Úbeda, and Baeza, unique in Andalusia, but with time they were drawn back into the royalists. Murcia stayed with the rebel cause, but did not coordinate much with the Junta, and the rebellion there had a character closer to the nearby Revolt of the Brotherhoods in Valencia in Aragon. In Extremadura to the southwest, the city of Plasencia joined the Comunidades, but this was undermined by the close proximity of other royalist cities such as Ciudad Rodrigo and Cáceres. A close correlation can be drawn between poor economic fortunes over the previous twenty years and the rebellion; central Castile suffered from agricultural failure and other setbacks under the Royal Council, while Andalusia was relatively prosperous with its maritime trade. Andalusia's leadership also feared that in the instability of a civil war, the Moriscos of Granada would likely revolt.

The rebels were strongest in the central plateau of Spain; the royalists controlled Andalusia in the South and Galicia in the North. Aragon was distracted by the Revolt of the Brotherhoods, and Navarre was occupied by Castilian troops who guarded against the return of the Navarrese king and the French. Rebel cities are in purple; Royalist cities are in green; cities with both elements present or that vacillated are in both colors.

== Popular and governmental response ==
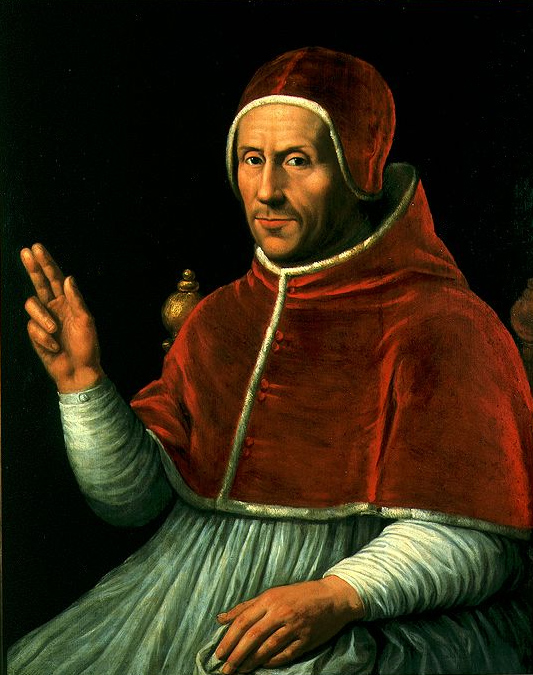
Adrian of Utrecht, future Pope Adrian VI, was considered an effective regent despite the difficult situation. He spearheaded the recruitment of nobility to the royalist side, and two Castilian co-regents were appointed to lessen the appearance of foreign control.

=== Turning of the nobles ===
The growing success of the comuneros emboldened people to accuse members of the old government of complicity with royal abuses. The protests attacked the landed nobility as well, many of whom had illegally taken property during the reign of the regents and weak kings after Isabella's death. In Dueñas, the Count of Buendía's vassals revolted against him on 1 September 1520, encouraged by rebel monks. This uprising was followed by others of a similar anti-feudal nature. The leadership of the comuneros was forced to take a stance on these new rebellions; reluctant to openly endorse them, the Junta initially denounced them but did nothing to oppose them. The dynamics of the uprising thus changed profoundly, as it could now jeopardize the status of the entire manorial system. The nobles had previously been somewhat sympathetic to the cause due to their loss of privileges to the central government. However, these new developments led to a dramatic drop in support for the comuneros from aristocrats, who were frightened by the more radical elements of the revolution.

=== Response of Charles I ===
At first, Charles seemed not to grasp the magnitude of the revolt. He continued to demand payments from Castile; with the government of Castile still in arrears, Cardinal Adrian found it impossible to secure any new loans. A letter from Cardinal Adrian on 25 August warned Charles of the severity of the situation:

Your Highness is making a great error if you think that you will be able to collect and make use of this tax; there is no one in the Kingdom, not in Seville or Valladolid or any other city who will ever pay anything of it; all the grandees and members of the council are amazed that Your Highness has scheduled payments from these funds.

— Adrian of Utrecht

Once he realized that a full-fledged revolution was underway, Charles responded vigorously. Through Cardinal Adrian, he undertook new policy initiatives, such as canceling the taxes granted in the Cortes of Corunna. Most important was the appointment of two new Castilian co-regents: the Constable of Castile, Íñigo Fernández, and the Admiral of Castile, Fadrique Enríquez. This negated two of the most salient complaints of the rebels. In addition, Adrian approached the nobles to convince them that their best interests lay with the king. The Royal Council was re-established in the fief of Admiral Enríquez, Medina de Rioseco, which enabled the Council to be nearer to the revolting cities and reassure skeptical supporters. While the royal army was still in tatters, many high nobles maintained their own well-trained mercenary armies—armies that with the revolt's recent radicalization would now fight for the king.

== Organization, funding, and diplomacy ==
The first political defeats of the comuneros came in October 1520. The comuneros' attempt to use Queen Joanna for legitimacy did not bear fruit, as she blocked their initiatives and refused to sign any edicts. In turn, dissenting voices inside the comuneros now began to be heard, especially in Burgos. The wavering position of Burgos was soon known to the royalists, and the Constable of Castile negotiated with Burgos's government. The Royal Council granted a number of significant concessions to Burgos in exchange for them leaving the Junta.

Following this incident, the Royal Council hoped that other cities would imitate Burgos and leave the comuneros peacefully. Valladolid, the former seat of royal power, was considered especially likely to turn, but too many supporters of the king had left city politics and lost their influence. It remained rebel-controlled. The Admiral of Castile continued his campaign to try to convince the comuneros to return to the royal government and thereby avoid a violent suppression. This attitude concealed a great shortage of funds on the royal side.

During October and November 1520, both sides accepted that a military conclusion would soon be necessary and actively devoted themselves to fundraising, recruiting soldiers, and training their troops. The comuneros organized their militias in the major cities and levied new taxes on the countryside; they also took measures aimed at eliminating waste, routinely auditing their treasurers and dismissing those thought to be corrupt. The royal government, which had lost much of its revenue due to the revolt, sought loans from Portugal and from conservative Castilian bankers, who saw reassuring signs in the switch of the allegiance of Burgos.

== Battle of Tordesillas ==
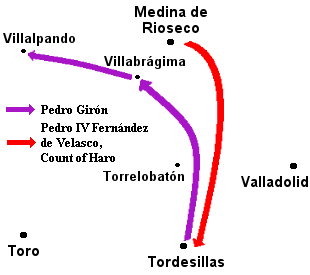
The royal army, commanded by the Constable of Castile's son, the Count of Haro, consisted of 6,000 infantry, 2,100 cavalry, and 12–15 artillery pieces. Pedro Girón's rebel force was larger but slower, with 10,000 infantry, 900 cavalry, and 13 artillery pieces. The rebels' deficiency in cavalry would hurt them throughout the war.

=== Leadership disputes ===
Gradually, both the city of Toledo and its leader Juan López de Padilla lost influence within the Junta, though Padilla retained popularity and prestige among the commoners. Two new figures emerged within the Comunidades, Pedro Girón and Antonio Osorio de Acuña. Girón was one of the most powerful nobles who supported the comuneros; his rebellion is thought to originate from Charles' refusal to grant Girón the prestigious Duchy of Medina-Sidonia a year prior to the war. Antonio de Acuña was the Bishop of Zamora. Acuña was also the head of the Comunidad in Zamora and the leader of its army, which included more than 300 priests.

On the royalist side, the nobles could not agree on what tactics to use. Some preferred to directly challenge the rebels in combat, while others such as the Constable of Castile favored continued waiting and the building of defensive fortifications. The Admiral of Castile preferred negotiations and exhausting all the possible peaceful options first. Patience, however, began to run thin; armies were expensive to maintain once assembled. In late November 1520, both armies took positions between Medina de Rioseco and Tordesillas, and a confrontation was inevitable.

=== Royal capture ===
With Pedro Girón in command, the army of the comuneros advanced on Medina de Rioseco, following the orders of the Junta. Girón established his headquarters in Villabrágima, a town merely 8 kilometres (5.0 mi) from the royalist army. The royalists occupied nearby villages to cut communication lines back to other comuneros.

This situation continued until 2 December, when Girón, apparently thinking the royal army would remain entrenched, (Note: There exists a theory that Girón's errors were in fact an intentional betrayal of the comuneros. Considering his moderate stance and later pardon by the government, historians such as Seaver consider this possible, but unlikely.) moved his forces west to the small town of Villalpando. The town surrendered the next day without resistance, and the troops began looting the estates in the area. However, with this movement, the comuneros left the path to Tordesillas completely unprotected. The royal army took advantage of the blunder, marching by night on 4 December and occupying Tordesillas the next day. The small rebel garrison was overwhelmed.

Seizure of Tordesillas marked a serious defeat for the comuneros, who lost Queen Joanna and with her their claim to legitimacy. In addition, thirteen representatives of the Junta were imprisoned, though others fled and escaped. Morale fell among the rebels, and much angry criticism was directed towards Pedro Girón for his maneuvering of the troops out of position and for his failure to attempt to retake Tordesillas or capture Medina de Rioseco. Girón was obliged to resign from his post and withdrew from the war.

== Events of December and January ==
=== Reorganization of the comuneros ===
Following the loss of Tordesillas, the comuneros regrouped in Valladolid. The Junta reconvened on 15 December, but with only eleven cities represented, down from a height of fourteen. Soria and Guadalajara's representatives did not return, and Burgos had left earlier. Valladolid would be the third capital of the rebels, after Ávila and Tordesillas.

The situation was somewhat worse for the army, with a large number of desertions in Valladolid and Villalpando. This forced the rebels to intensify their recruitment drives, especially in Toledo, Salamanca, and Valladolid itself. With these new recruits and the arrival of Juan de Padilla to Valladolid, the rebel military apparatus was rebuilt and morale bolstered. At the beginning of 1521, the comuneros prepared for an all-out war, despite disagreements within the movement. Some suggested seeking a peaceful resolution, while others favored continuing the war. Those who favored war were divided between two tactics: occupy Simancas and Torrelobatón, a less ambitious proposal defended by Pedro Laso de la Vega; or lay siege to Burgos, a tactic favored by Padilla.

=== Military initiatives in Palencia and Burgos ===
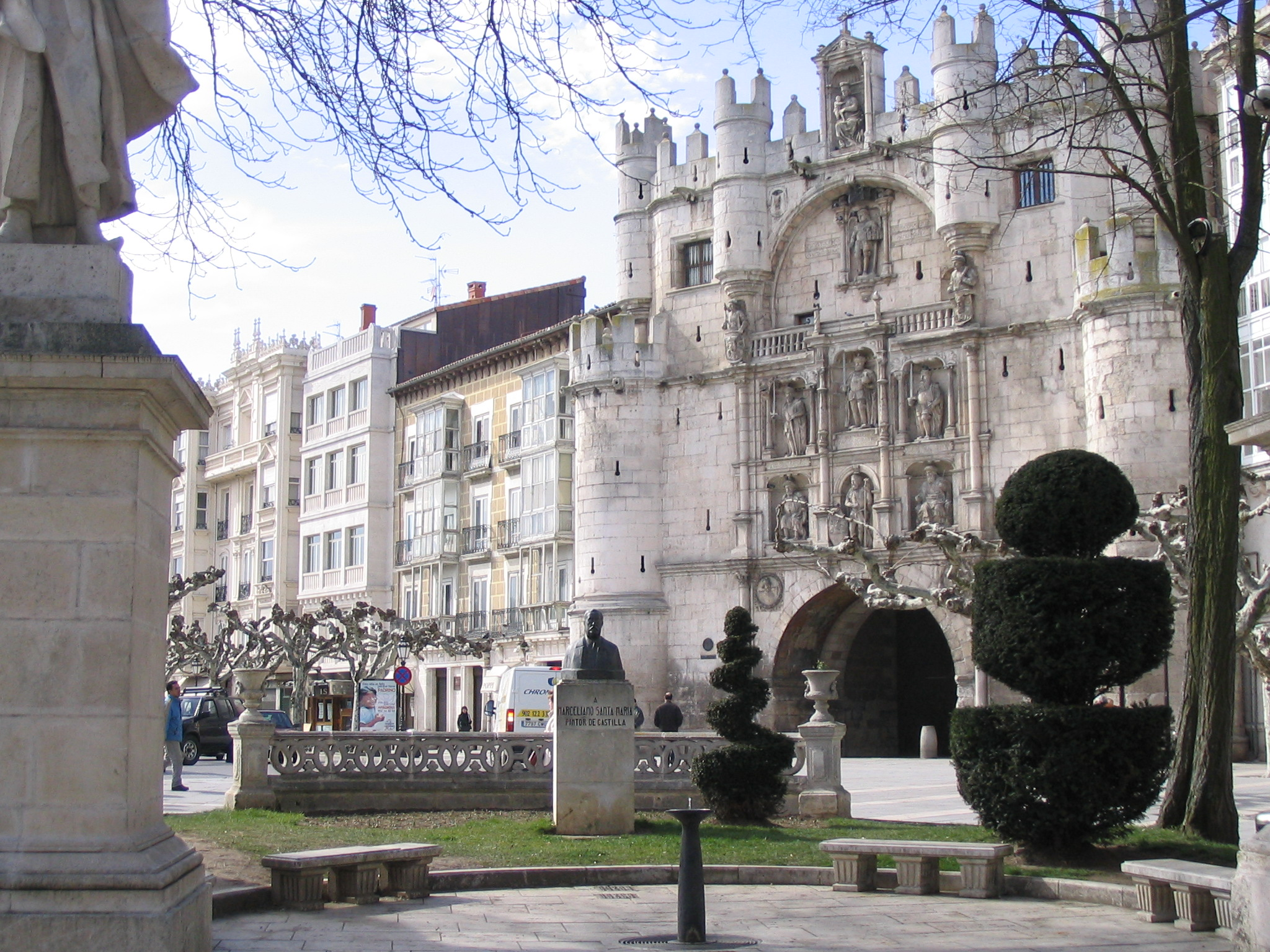
Arco de Santa María in Burgos, one of the few cities loyal to the king on the Iberian plateau

In the far north of Castile, the rebel army began a series of operations conducted by Antonio de Acuña, bishop of Zamora. They received orders from the Junta on 23 December to try and raise a rebellion in Palencia. They were tasked with expelling royalists, collecting taxes on behalf of the Junta, and creating an administration sympathetic to the comuneros cause. Acuña's army made a series of raids into the area around Dueñas, raising more than 4,000 ducats and inspiring the peasantry. He returned to Valladolid in early 1521, then came back to Dueñas on 10 January to begin a major offensive against the nobles of Tierra de Campos. The nobles' land and holdings were completely devastated.

In mid-January, Pedro de Ayala, Count of Salvatierra, joined the comuneros and organized an army of about two thousand men who set about raiding the north of Castile. Nearby, Burgos awaited the fulfillment of the pledges made by Cardinal Adrian after they had joined the royalist cause two months prior. The slow response led to dissatisfaction and uncertainty in the city. Ayala and Acuña, aware of this situation, decided to besiege Burgos, Ayala from its north and Acuña from its south. They also sought to undermine the defenses by encouraging a revolt of the inhabitants of Burgos.

=== Royalist response ===
Still in Germany, Charles V issued the Edict of Worms on 17 December 1520 (not to be confused with the Edict of Worms of 25 May 1521, against Martin Luther), which condemned 249 prominent Comunidad members. For secular rebels, the punishment was death; clergy were to receive lighter penalties. Similarly, the edict also declared that those who supported the Comunidades were traitors, disloyal, rebels, and infidels.

The Royal Council's next move was the occupation of Ampudia in Palencia, a town loyal to the Count of Salvatierra. The Junta sent Padilla to meet Acuña; their combined force besieged the royal army at the castle of Mormojón. The royal army slipped away by nightfall, and Mormojón was forced to pay tribute to avoid being pillaged. Ampudia was recovered by the rebels the next day, 16 January.

Meanwhile, the rebellion in Burgos scheduled for 23 January was a failure due to poor coordination with the besieging army; it started two days early and was easily crushed. The comuneros of Burgos had to surrender, and this was the last rebellion to be seen in Castile.

== Rebel campaigns of early 1521 ==
=== Padilla's decision on the rebels' next move ===
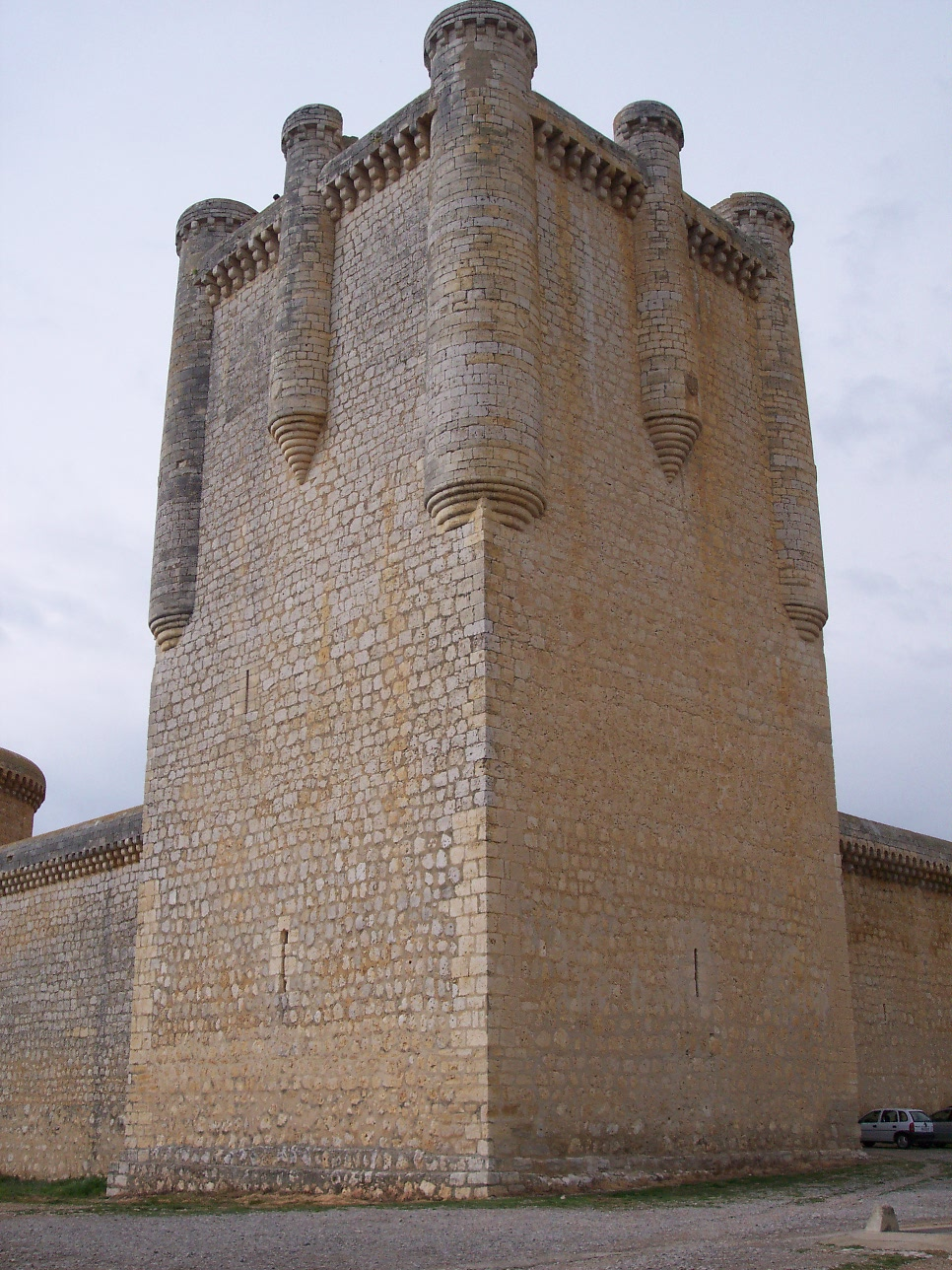
The taking of the Castle of Torrelobatón, built in the 13th century, provided a much-needed victory for the comuneros. The castle was renovated in 2007 and is now a tourist site.

After abandoning the siege of Burgos due to the failure of its revolt, Padilla decided to return to Valladolid, while Acuña opted to resume his skirmishing and harassment of noble properties around Tierra de Campos. With this series of actions, Acuña intended to destroy or occupy the homes of the prominent nobles. The rebels now set themselves completely against the manorial system. This would be one of the strongest features of the second phase of the rebellion.

After the recent setbacks suffered by the comuneros, Padilla realized that they needed a victory to raise morale. He decided to take Torrelobatón and its castle. Torrelobatón was a stronghold halfway between Tordesillas and Medina de Rioseco, and was very close to Valladolid. Taking it would grant the rebels an excellent fortress for launching military operations and remove a threat on Valladolid.

=== Battle of Torrelobatón ===
On 21 February 1521, the siege of Torrelobatón began. Outnumbered, the town nevertheless resisted for four days, thanks to its walls. On 25 February, the comuneros entered the town and subjected it to a massive looting spree as a reward to the troops. Only churches were spared. The castle resisted for another two days. The comuneros then threatened to hang all of the inhabitants, at which point the castle surrendered. The defenders did secure an agreement to spare half of the goods inside the castle, thus avoiding further looting.

The victory in Torrelobatón lifted the spirits of the rebel camp while worrying the royalists about the rebel advance, exactly as Padilla hoped. The faith of the nobles in Cardinal Adrian was again shaken, as he was accused of having done nothing to avoid losing Torrelobatón. The Constable of Castile began to send troops to the Tordesillas area to contain the rebels and prevent any further advances.

Despite the renewed enthusiasm among the rebels, a decision was made to remain in their positions near Valladolid without pressing their advantage or launching a new attack. This caused many of the soldiers to return to their home communities, tired of waiting for salaries and new orders. This was a problem the comunero forces had throughout the war; they possessed only a small number of full-time soldiers, and their militias were constantly "dissolving and recruiting." A serious attempt to negotiate a peaceful end to the war was tried again by the moderates, but was undercut by extremists of both sides.

In the north, after the failure of the siege of Burgos in January, the Count of Salvatierra resumed his campaign. He set off to cause an uprising in Merindades, the homeland of the Constable of Castile, and besieged Medina de Pomar and Frías.

=== Acuña's southern campaign ===
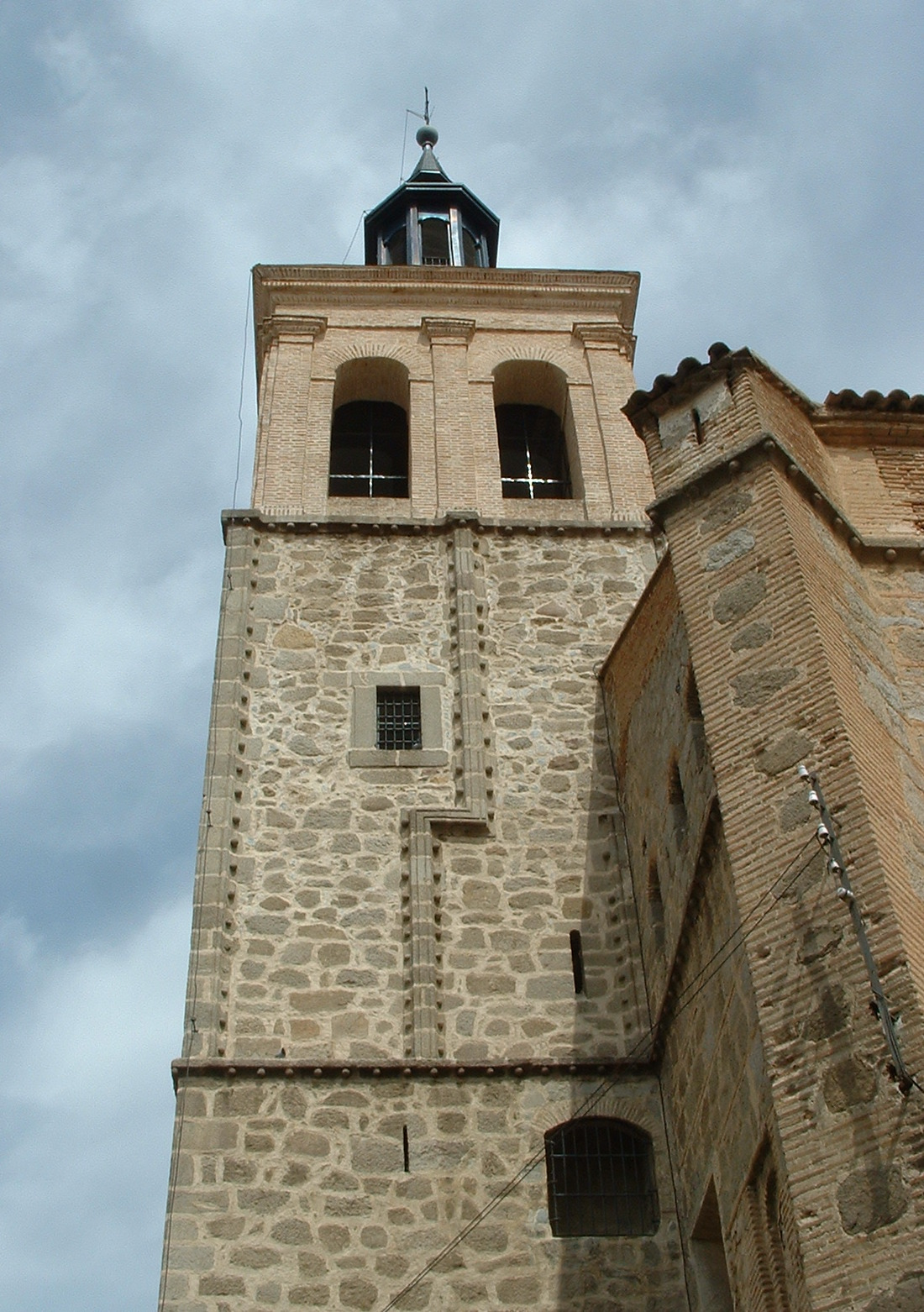
The Church of the Virgin of Highest Grace in Mora, completely reconstructed after royalist troops set fire to it while 50 refugees took shelter inside. The royalist commander Prior Zúñiga denied responsibility.

William de Croÿ, the young Flemish Archbishop of Toledo appointed by Charles, died in January 1521 in Worms, Germany. In Valladolid, the Junta proposed to Antonio de Acuña that he submit himself as a candidate for the seat.

Acuña departed for Toledo in February with a small force under his command. He traveled south, declaring his impending claim on the archdiocese to every village as he passed. This raised enthusiasm among the commoners, who received him with cheers, but aroused suspicion in the aristocracy. They feared Acuña might attack their holdings as he did in Tierra de Campos. The Marquis of Villena and Duke of Infantado contacted Acuña and persuaded him to sign a pact of mutual neutrality.

Acuña soon had to confront Antonio de Zúñiga, who had been appointed commander of the royalist army in the Toledo area. Zúñiga was a prior in the Knights of St. John, who maintained a base in Castile at the time. Acuña received information that Zúñiga was in the area of Corral de Almaguer, and pursued battle with him near Tembleque. Zúñiga drove the rebel forces off, and then launched a counterattack of his own between Lillo and El Romeral, inflicting a crushing defeat on Acuña. Acuña, a relentless self-promoter, tried to minimize the loss and even claimed that he had emerged victorious from the confrontation.

Undaunted, Acuña continued into Toledo. He appeared at the Zocodover Plaza in the heart of the city on 29 March 1521, Good Friday. The crowd gathered around him and took him directly to the cathedral, claiming the archbishop's chair for him. The next day he met with María Pacheco, wife of Juan de Padilla and de facto leader of the Toledo Comunidad in her husband's absence. A brief rivalry emerged between the two, but it was resolved after mutual attempts at reconciliation.

Once settled in the archdiocese of Toledo, Acuña began to recruit any men he could find, enlisting soldiers from fifteen to sixty years old. After royalist troops burned the town of Mora on 12 April, Acuña returned to the countryside with roughly 1,500 men under his command. He moved into Yepes, and from there conducted raids and operations against royalist-controlled rural areas. He first attacked and pillaged Villaseca de la Sagra, then faced Zúñiga again in an inconclusive battle near the Tagus river in Illescas. Light skirmishing near Toledo would continue until news of Villalar ended the war.

== Battle of Villalar ==
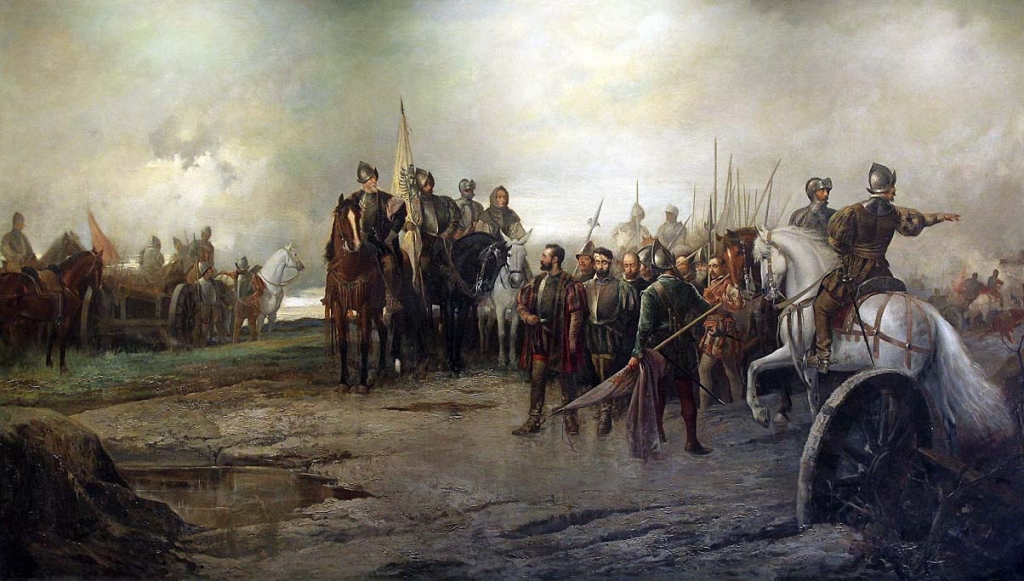
A 19th century work by Manuel Picolo López depicting the Battle of Villalar

In early April 1521, the royalist side moved to combine their armies and threaten Torrelobatón. The Constable of Castile moved his troops (including soldiers recently transferred from the defense of Navarre) southwest from Burgos to meet with the Admiral's forces near Tordesillas. Meanwhile, the comuneros reinforced their troops at Torrelobatón, which was far less secure than the comuneros preferred. Their forces were suffering from desertions, and the presence of royalist artillery would make Torrelobatón's castle vulnerable. Juan López de Padilla considered withdrawing to Toro to seek reinforcements in early April, but wavered. He delayed his decision until the early hours of 23 April, losing considerable time and allowing the royalists to unite their forces in Peñaflor.

The combined royalist army pursued the comuneros. Again, the royalists had a strong advantage in cavalry, with their army consisting of 6,000 infantry and 2,400 cavalry against Padilla's 7,000 infantry and 400 cavalry. Heavy rain slowed Padilla's infantry more than the royalist cavalry and rendered the primitive firearms of the rebels' 1,000 arquebusiers nearly useless. Padilla hoped to reach the relative safety of Toro and the heights of Vega de Valdetronco, but his infantry was too slow. He gave battle with the harrying royalist cavalry at the town of Villalar. The cavalry charges scattered the rebel ranks, and the battle became a slaughter. There were an estimated 500–1,000 rebel casualties and many desertions.

The three most important leaders of the rebellion were captured: Juan López de Padilla, Juan Bravo, and Francisco Maldonado. They were beheaded the next morning in the Plaza of Villalar, with a large portion of the royalist nobility present. The remains of the rebel army at Villalar fragmented, with some attempting to join Acuña's army near Toledo and others deserting. The rebellion had been struck a crippling blow.

== End of the war ==
After the Battle of Villalar, the towns of northern Castile soon succumbed to the king's troops, with all its cities returning their allegiance to the king by early May. Only Madrid and Toledo kept their Comunidades alive.

=== Resistance of Toledo ===
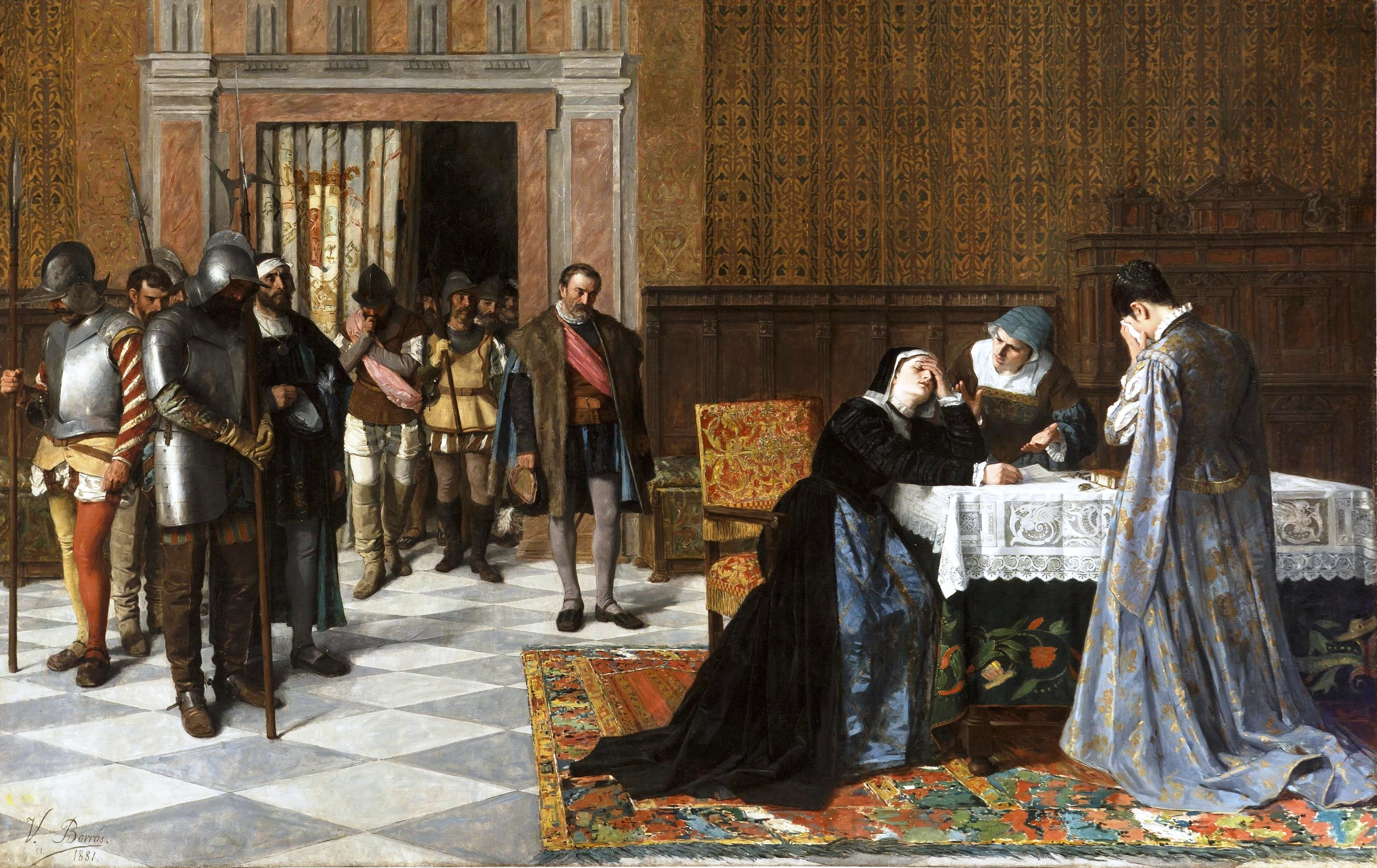
María Pacheco receives notice of the death of her husband at Villalar. The painting is a 19th-century work by Vicente Borrás.

The first news of Villalar arrived in Toledo on 26 April, but was largely ignored by the local Comunidad. The magnitude of the defeat became apparent in a few days, after the first survivors began arriving in the city and confirmed the fact that the three rebel leaders had been executed. Toledo was declared in mourning over the death of Juan de Padilla.

After the death of Padilla, Bishop Acuña lost popularity in favor of María Pacheco, Padilla's widow. People began to suggest negotiating with the royalists, seeking to avoid further suffering in the city. The situation looked even worse after the surrender of Madrid on 11 May. The fall of Toledo seemed only to be a matter of time.

However, one ray of hope remained for the rebels. Castile had withdrawn some of its troops from occupied Navarre to fight the comuneros, and King Francis I of France used the opportunity to invade with support from the Navarrese. The royalist army was forced to march on Navarre to respond rather than besiege Toledo. Acuña left Toledo to travel to Navarre, but he was recognized and caught. It is disputed whether he was seeking to join the French and continue fighting, or was simply fleeing.

María Pacheco took control of the city and the remains of the rebel army, living in the Alcázar, collecting taxes, and strengthening defenses. She requested the intervention of her uncle, the respected Marquis of Villena, to negotiate with the Royal Council, hoping he would be able to obtain better concessions. The Marquis eventually abandoned the negotiations, and María Pacheco took on personal negotiations with Prior Zúñiga, the commander of the besieging forces. Her demands, though somewhat galling to honor, were ultimately minor, such as guaranteeing the property and reputation of her children.

Still concerned about the French, the royal government gave in. With the support of all parties, the surrender of Toledo was orchestrated on 25 October 1521. Thus, on 31 October the comuneros left the Alcázar of Toledo and new officials were appointed to run the city. The truce guaranteed the freedom and property of all the comuneros.

=== Revolt of February 1522 ===
The new administrator of Toledo restored order and brought the city back under royal control. However, he also provoked former comuneros. María Pacheco continued her presence in the city and refused to hand over all the hidden weapons until Charles V personally signed the agreements reached with the Order of St. John. This unstable situation came to an end on 3 February 1522, when the generous terms of the surrender were annulled. Royal soldiers filled the city and the administrator ordered Pacheco's execution. Riots broke out in protest. The incident was temporarily remedied thanks to the intervention of María de Mendoza, the sister of María Pacheco. Another truce was granted, and while the former comuneros were defeated, the distraction was exploited by María Pacheco to escape to Portugal disguised as a farmer.

=== Pardon of 1522 ===
Charles V returned to Spain on 16 July 1522. Acts of repression and retaliation against former comuneros did occur, but only sporadically. Embarrassingly large numbers of important people had supported the comuneros, or at least were suspiciously slow to declare allegiance to the king, and Charles thought it unwise to press the issue too much.

Back in Valladolid, Charles declared a general pardon on 1 November. The pardon gave amnesty to everyone involved in the revolt with the exception of 293 comuneros, a small figure given the huge number of rebels. Both Pacheco and Bishop Acuña were among the 293 excluded from the pardon. More pardons were issued later, after pressure from the Cortes; by 1527, the repression was completely at end. Of the 293, 23 were executed, 20 died in prison, 50 purchased amnesty, and 100 were pardoned later. The fates of the rest are unknown.

== Aftermath ==
María Pacheco successfully escaped to Portugal, where she lived in exile the remaining ten years of her life. Bishop Acuña, captured in Navarre, was stripped of his ecclesiastical standing and executed after he killed a guard while trying to escape. Pedro Girón received a pardon conditional on him going into exile to Oran in North Africa, where he served as a commander against the Moors. Queen Joanna continued to be locked away in Tordesillas by her son, where she remained for thirty-five more years, the rest of her life.

Emperor Charles V would go on to rule one of the largest and most sprawling empires in European history. As a consequence, Charles was nearly constantly at war, fighting France, England, the Papal States, the Ottoman Turks, the Aztecs, the Incas, and the Protestant Schmalkaldic League during his reign. Spain would provide the bulk of the Habsburgs' armies and financial resources over this period. Charles placed Castilians in high governmental positions in both Castile and the Empire at large, and generally left the administration of Castile in Castilian hands. In that sense, the revolt could be considered successful.

Some of the reforms of Isabella I which reduced noble power were reversed as a price for luring the nobility to the royalist side. However, Charles understood that noble encroachment of power had helped cause the revolt, and embarked upon a new reform program. Unpopular, corrupt, and ineffective officials were replaced; judicial functions of the Royal Council were limited; and local courts were revitalized. Charles also adjusted the membership of the Royal Council; its hated president Antonio de Rojas Manrique was replaced, the aristocracy's role reduced, and more gentry were added to it. Realizing that the urban elite needed to have a stake in the royal government's success, Charles gave many of them positions, privileges, and government salaries. The Cortes, while not as important as the comuneros had hoped, nevertheless maintained its power; it was still required to approve new taxes and could advise the king. Charles also discouraged his officials from using overly coercive methods, after seeing his heavy-handed treatment of the Cortes of Corunna backfire. The co-option of the middle class arguably worked too well; when Charles' successor King Phillip II demanded a ruinously large tax increase in the 1580s, the Cortes was too dependent on the Crown for money to effectively resist policies that would wreck the economy.

== Later influence ==
The revolt, fresh in the memory of Spain, is referenced in several literary works during Spain's Golden Age. Don Quixote references the rebellion in a conversation with Sancho, and Francisco de Quevedo uses the word "comunero" as a synonym for "rebel" in his works.

In the 18th century, the comuneros were not held in high regard by the Spanish Empire. The government was not amenable to encouraging rebellions, and only used the term to condemn opposition. In the Revolt of the Comuneros in Paraguay, the rebels did not take the name willingly; the term was used by their opponents to disparage them as traitors. Another Revolt of the Comuneros in New Granada (modern Colombia) was similarly unrelated to the original except in name.

At the beginning of the 19th century, the image of the comuneros began to be rehabilitated by scholars such as Manuel Quintana as precursors of freedom and martyrs against absolutism. The decline of Castilian liberty was linked to the later decline of Spain. The first major commemorative event came in 1821, the third centenary of the Battle of Villalar. Juan Martín Díez, a nationalistic liberal military leader who had fought in the resistance against Napoleon, led an expedition to find and exhume the remains of the three leaders executed in 1521. Díez praised the comuneros on behalf of the liberal government in power at the time, likely the first positive governmental recognition for their cause. This view was challenged by conservatives who viewed a centralized state as modern and progressive, especially after the anarchy and fragmentation of the 1868 Revolution in Spain. Manuel Danvila, a conservative government minister, published the six-volume Historia critica y documentada de las Comunidades de Castilla from 1897 to 1900, one of the most important works of scholarship on the revolt. Drawing on collected original sources, Danvila emphasized the fiscal demands of the comuneros, and cast them as traditionalist, reactionary, medieval, and feudal. Though a liberal, intellectual Gregorio Marañón shared the dim view of the comuneros that again prevailed in Spain; he cast the conflict as one between a modern, progressive state open to beneficent foreign influence against a conservative, reactionary, and xenophobic Spain hypersensitive to religious and cultural deviance with an insistence on spurious racial purity.

General Franco's government from 1939 to 1975 also encouraged an unfavorable interpretation of the comuneros. According to approved historians such as José María Pemán, the revolt was fundamentally an issue of petty Spanish regionalism, something which Franco did his best to discourage. Additionally, the comuneros did not properly appreciate Spain's "imperial destiny."

Since the mid-twentieth century, others have sought more materialist reasons for the revolt. Historians such as José Antonio Maravall and Joseph Pérez portray the developing revolt as alliances of different social coalitions around shifting economic interests, with the "industrial bourgeoisie" of artisans and woolworkers combining with the intellectuals and the low nobility against the aristocrats and the merchants. Maravall, who views the revolt as one of the first modern revolutions, especially stresses the ideological conflict and intellectual nature of the revolt, with features such as the first proposed written constitution of Castile.

With Spain's transition to democracy following Franco's death, celebration of the comuneros started to become permissible again. On 23 April 1976, a small ceremony was held clandestinely in Villalar; only two years later, in 1978, the event had become a huge demonstration of 200,000 in support of Castilian autonomy. The autonomous community of Castile and León was created in response to public demand in 1983, and it recognized 23 April as an official holiday in 1986. Similarly, each 3 February since 1988 has been celebrated by the Castilian nationalist party Tierra Comunera in Toledo. The celebration highlights the roles of Juan López de Padilla and María Pacheco, and is done in memory of the rebellion in 1522, the last event of the war.

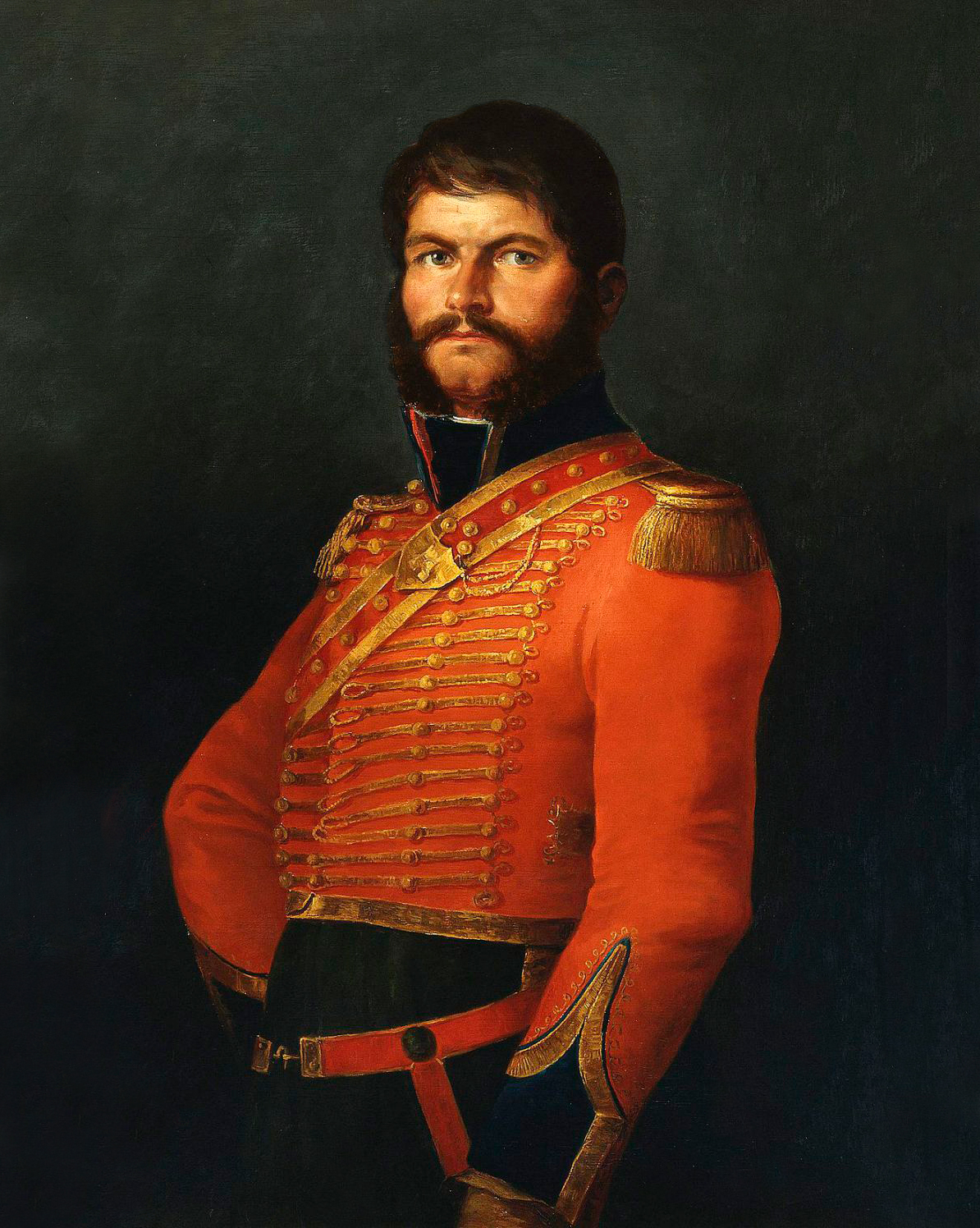
Juan Martín Díez, El Empecinado ("The Undaunted"), who tried to rehabilitate the reputation of the comuneros in 1821

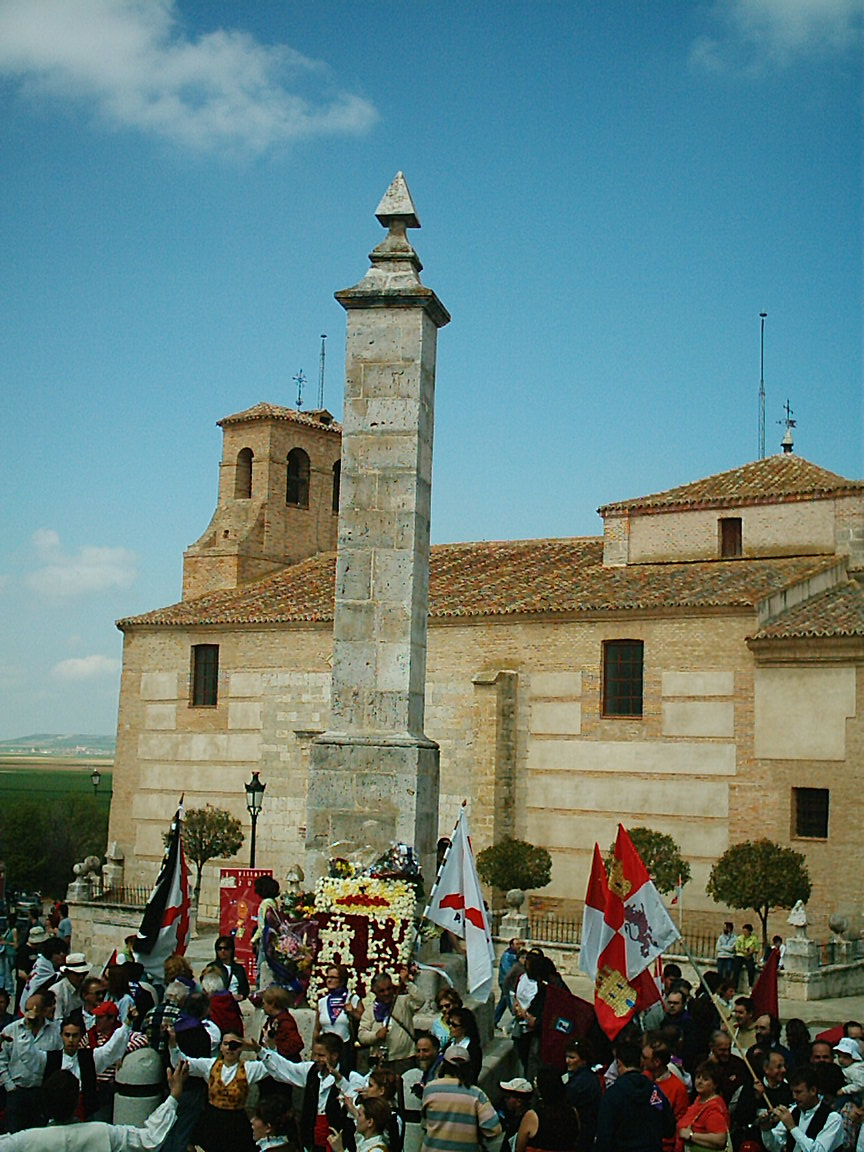
A floral offering at Villalar, on Castile and León Day, 23 April 2006

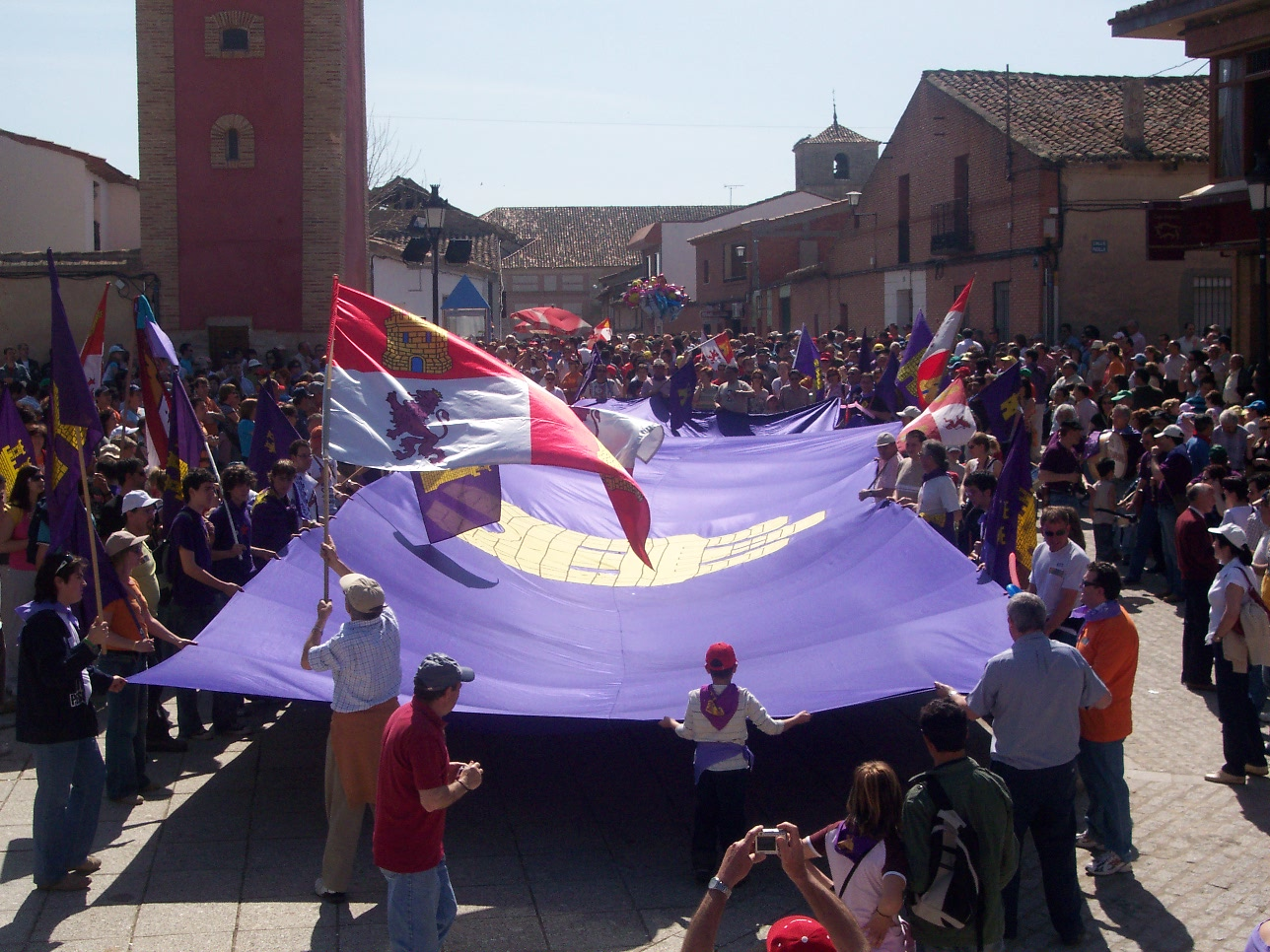
The 23 April 2007 gathering at Villalar. Villalar was renamed Villalar de los Comuneros in 1932, under the liberal Second Republic.

== See also ==
- Italian War of 1521–1526
- List of people associated with the Revolt of the Comuneros
- Military history of the Revolt of the Comuneros
- Revolt of the Brotherhoods
- Spanish conquest of Iberian Navarre

== Bibliography ==
English sources

- Haliczer, Stephen (1981). The Comuneros of Castile: The Forging of a Revolution, 1475–1521. Madison, Wisconsin: University of Wisconsin Press. ISBN 0-299-08500-7.
- Lynch, John (1964). Spain under the Habsburgs. Vol. (vol. 1). New York: Oxford University Press.
- Miller, Townsend (1963). The Castles and the Crown. New York: Coward-McCann.
- Seaver, Henry Latimer (1966) [1928]. The Great Revolt in Castile: A Study of the Comunero Movement of 1520–1521. New York: Octagon Books.

Spanish and French sources

- Díez, José Luis (1977). Los Comuneros de Castilla (in Spanish). Madrid: Editorial Mañana. ISBN 84-7421-025-9. OCLC 4188611.
- Guilarte, Alfonso María (1983). El obispo Acuña: Historia de un comunero (in Spanish). Valladolid: Ambito. ISBN 84-86047-13-7.
- Maravall, José Antonio (1963). Las comunidades de Castilla: Una primera revolución moderna (in Spanish). Madrid: Revista de Occidente. OCLC 2182035.
- Gutiérrez Nieto, Juan Ignacio (1973). Las comunidades como movimiento antiseñorial: La formación del bando realista en la Guerra Civil Castellana de 1520–1521 (in Spanish). Barcelona: Editorial Planeta. OCLC 862423.
- Pérez, Joseph (1998) [1970]. La révolution des "Comunidades" de Castille, 1520–1521 (in French). Bordeaux: Institut d'études ibériques et ibéro-américaines de l'Université de Bordeaux. ISBN 84-323-0285-6.
- Pérez, Joseph (2001). Los Comuneros (in Spanish). Madrid: La Esfera de los Libros, S.L. ISBN 84-9734-003-5.
