= Nuño Rasura =

Castilian judge

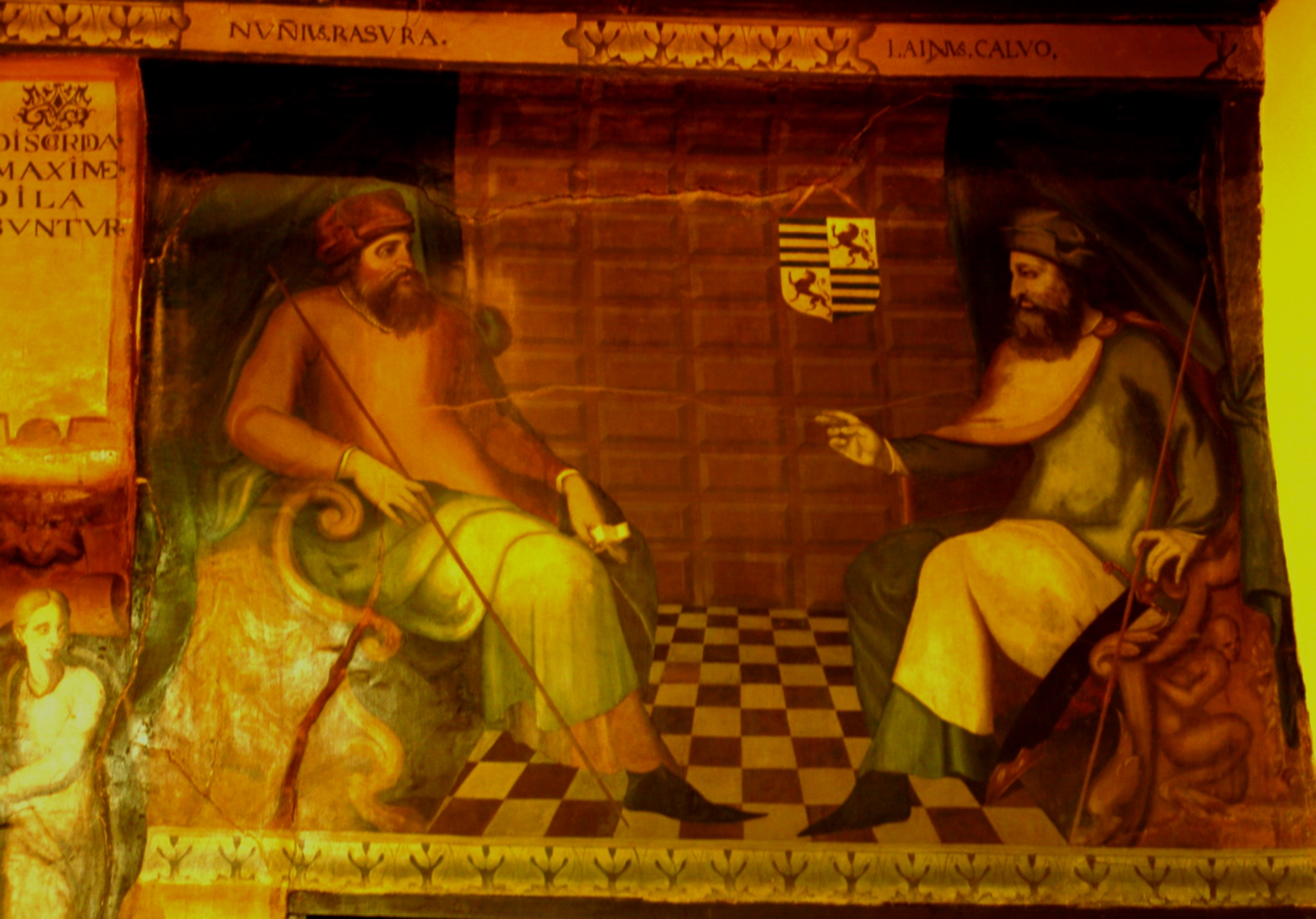
Nuño Rasura and Laín Calvo in fresco at the Arco de Santa María in Burgos.

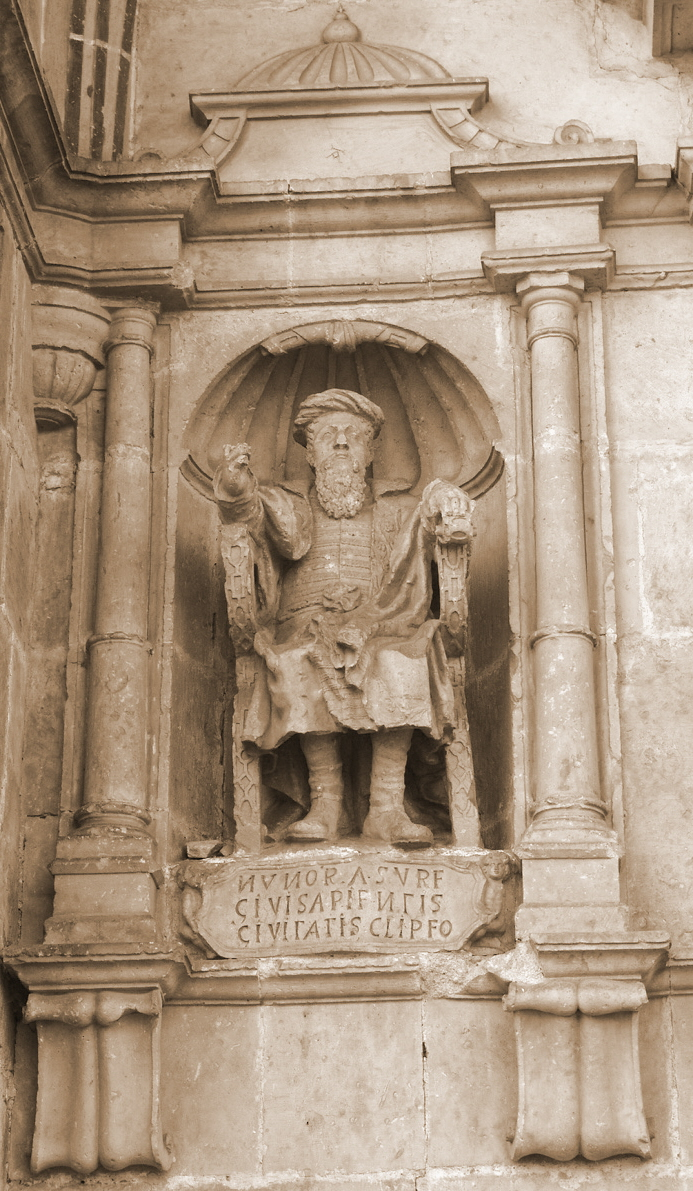
Statue of Nuño Rasura at the church of Bisjueces, Merindades, Burgos province.

Nuño Rasura was one of two legendary judges of Castile, the other being his son-in-law Laín Calvo. According to the Mocedades de Rodrigo, Nuño gained the nickname "Rasura" because "he took from Castile equal measures of wheat" to offer as a gift to Church of Saint James. English medievalist Richard A. Fletcher writes that "the legend of the judges has more to tell us of the Castilians' self-image at a later date than of the realities of the ninth century: they liked to think of themselves as sturdy, independent, resourceful, democratic."

The twelfth-century Liber regum and the Poema de Fernán González report that at the end of the ninth century reign of Alfonso II of Asturias (died 842), two judges were named to administer and defend the newly repopulating region that would become Castile. Nuño and Laín are described by the Poema as ancestors, respectively, of Castilian heroes Fernán González of Castile and El Cid. The fullest account of the judges is given in Lucas de Tuy (writing c.1236), who makes Nuño Rasura come from Catalonia. A prudent man, he convinced all the nobles of Castile to send him their sons that he might educate them. He ruled as far as the river Pisuerga. His supposed son, Gonzalo Núñez, was elected to succeed him on his death, and was given the title count. He is said to have married Jimena, daughter of Nuño Fernández, and to have been by her the father of Fernán González. Gonzalo was a just man and a good soldier, who waged many wars with the "tyrannical" Kings of León and the Moors.

It has been suggested that Nuño Rasura is to be identified with a historical Munio Núñez (named as Nuño Núñez in older histories), the early ninth century repoblador who along with wife Argilo in 824 granted certain fueros (charters of privileges) to the village of Brañosera. These grants were confirmed by the later Counts of Castile, the claimed descendants of Rasura. Munio and Argilo are thought to have been grandparents (or more distant ancestors) of Castilian counts Munio Núñez and Roa, Gonzalo Fernández of Lara and Nuño Fernández of Amaya, as well as of Muniadomna Núñez, queen to García I of León.
