= Jueces de Castilla =

Jueces de Castilla (English: Judges of Castile) are two legendary figures of the County of Castile, chosen by primitive Castilians to avoid the implementation of liber iudiciorum by the Leonese court. It was based on local customary law or fazañas.
