= Antonio Osorio de Acuña =

Spanish bishop

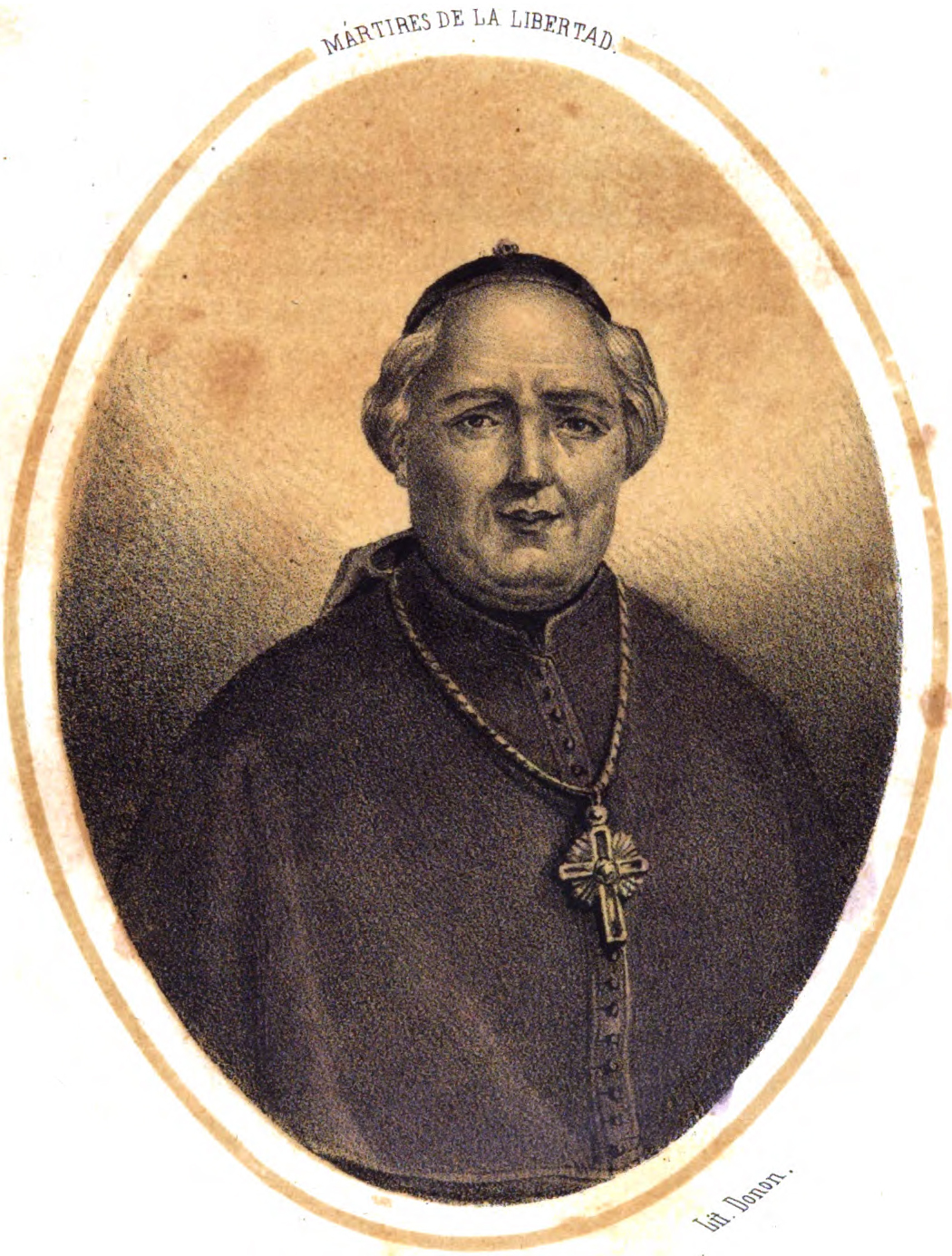
Antonio Osorio de Acuna

Don Antonio Osorio de Acuña (1459 in Valladolid – 23 March 1526) was a Spanish bishop of Zamora, appointed 4 January 1507, during the reigns of Ferdinand II and Charles V. He filled that see in 1519, when the civil war broke out in Spain. Instead of espousing the interests of the throne, he joined the insurgent comuneros. According to his critics, his choice of allegiance was purely opportunistic and due to longstanding disputes with other members of the clergy.

When he appeared at Tordesillas, the general rendezvous of the discontented deputies, he was received with enthusiasm. Being entrusted with ammunition and men, he marched against the royal generals, and was for the most part successful. In the view of identifying religion with liberty, he raised a regiment of priests, whom he always conducted to battle; and though 60 years of age, he was sure to be right in the middle of the action. "Follow me, my parson!" was his usual exhortation, as he plunged into the dense ranks of the enemy. By the Conde de Haro, the rebels were at length defeated; but the priests stood firm; and dreadful was the carnage which they produced among the royalists. One of them slew eleven by himself. He was alleged to have given his benediction to foes on the field, making the sign of the cross with his musket before firing.

When Toledo was besieged by the royalists, the bishop hastened to that city, not so much to assist Maria Pacheco in repelling the assailants, as to seize the vacant archbishopric. By the populace he was speedily proclaimed; and when the chapter refused to elect him, he and Maria committed the members to prison and the latter were compelled to live on bread and water until they had not only elected him, but given up their treasures for the use of the insurgents.

After Juan Lopez de Padilla was imprisoned on 24 April 1521, the royalist cause triumphed. The fortresses submitted, and the bishop fled towards France. In Navarre, however, he was recognized, seized, and sent to the dungeon of Simancas. There, in February 1526, he broke the skull of the alcalde with a brick, and was escaping, when the son of the officer discovered and secured him. This was his last act of violence. By a papal bull, he was degraded, and delivered over to the secular arm. He was tried, sentenced, and beheaded in prison.

== External links and additional sources ==
- Cheney, David M. "Diocese of Zamora". Catholic-Hierarchy.org. (for Chronology of Bishops) ^{[self-published]}
- Chow, Gabriel. "Diocese of Zamora (Spain)". GCatholic.org. (for Chronology of Bishops) ^{[self-published]}
