= José Antonio Maravall =

Spanish historian and essayist

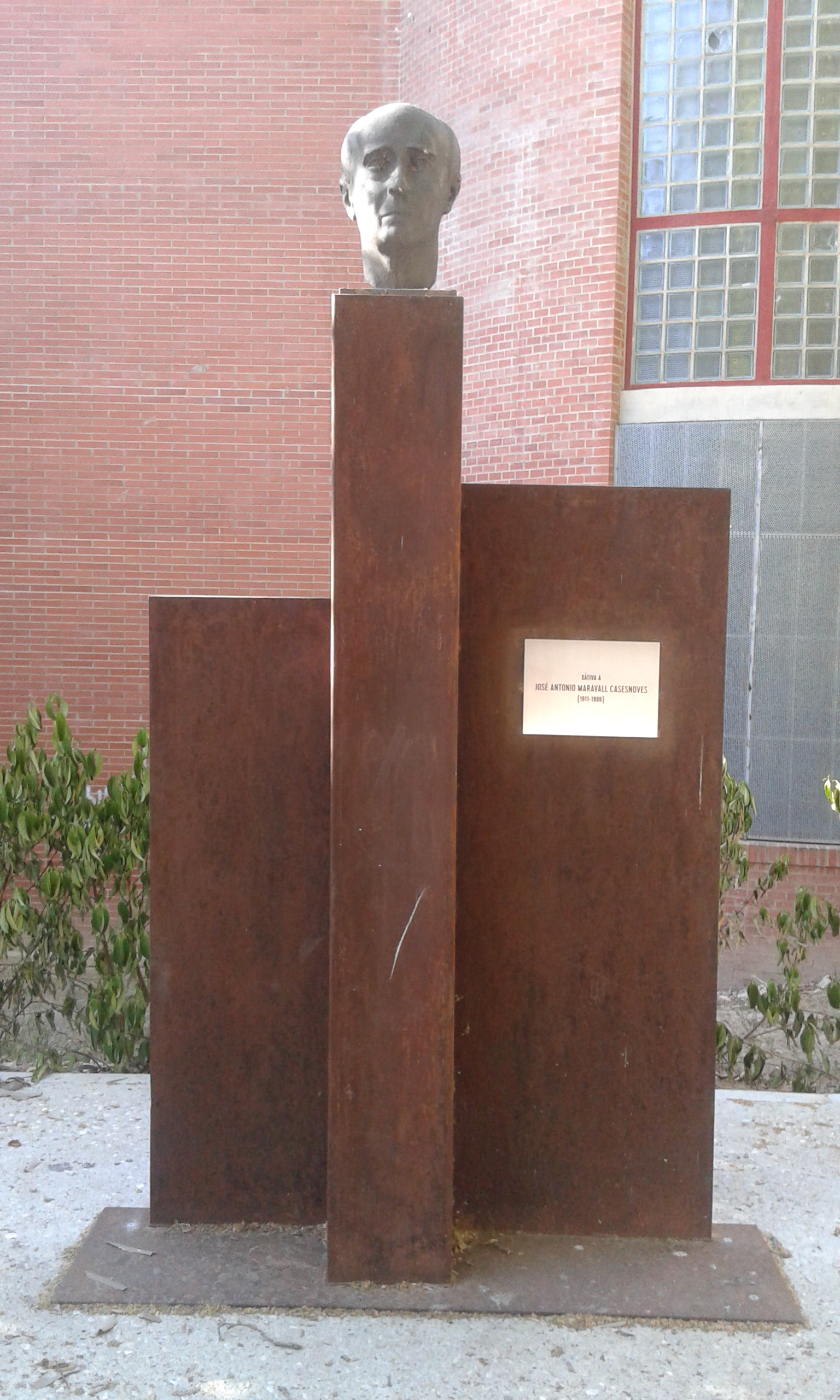
Estàtua a José Antonio Maravall Casesnoves

José Antonio Maravall Casesnoves (1911 in Xàtiva – 1986 in Madrid) was a Spanish historian and essayist associated with the Generation of '36 movement.

== Biography ==
Maravall studied philosophy and law at the University of Murcia, where he completed his final degree in political science and economics at the Central University, where he was a student of Jose Ortega y Gasset. He became a university professor in Spain and abroad. Maravall was head of the department at the University of La Laguna and the Complutense University of Madrid. He also became a member of the Real Academia de la Historia and the president of the Spanish Association of Historical Sciences.

In Francoist Spain Maravall avoided some of the more politically sensitive topics of his work. He wrote poetry during this period, and co-founded the Nueva Revista ("New Magazine") literary review with José Antonio Muñoz Rojas and Leopoldo Panero.

Maravall's work on Spanish history is considered foundational, and he is one of the highest authorities on the Old Regime of Monarchist Spain. In 1987, he received the National Essay Prize given by the Spanish Ministry of Culture. The University of Toulouse granted Maravall an honorary degree in recognition of his work.

His son, José María Maravall, was Education Minister in the first government of Felipe González in 1982.

== Works ==
=== Books ===
- Carlos V y el pensamiento político del Renacimiento
- Concepto de España en la Edad Media (1954)
- Las comunidades de Castilla: Una primera revolución moderna. Madrid: Revista de Occidente. 1963. OCLC 2182035.
- La cultura del Barroco. Análisis de una estructura histórica (1975).
  - Translated by Terry Cochran as Culture of the Baroque: Analysis of a Historical Structure, University of Minneapolis Press, 1986.
- Utopia y contrautopia en el Quijote (1976)
  - Translated by Robert W. Felkel as Utopia and Counterutopia in the Quixote, Detroit: Wayne State University Press, 1991.
- Poder, honor y elites en el s. XVII (1979)
- Utopía y reformismo en la España de los Austrias (1982)
- El humanismo en las armas de Don Quijote (1948)
- Estudios de Historia del pensamiento español (1984)
- La literatura picaresca desde la historia social (1986)

=== Articles ===
- Hacia el hombre (Revista de occidente, 1935)
