= Fazañas =

Medieval Spanish legal system

Fazañas was a customary law system used in the County of Castile, similar to the ones used in Principality of Catalonia, Kingdom of Aragón and Kingdom of Valencia during the Middle Ages.
