= Aldeaseca =

- Municipality
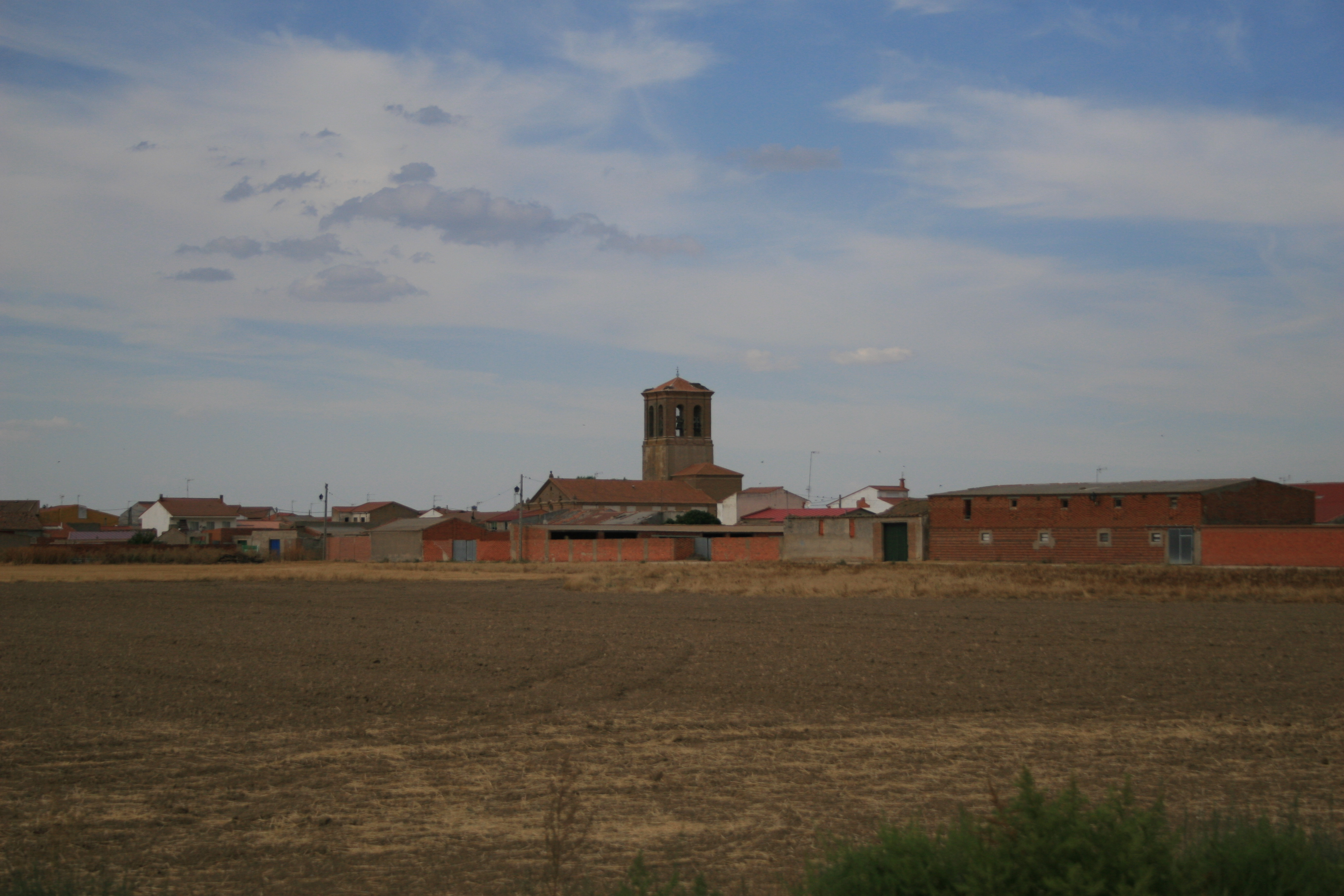

- Flag Coat of arms

- Location in Spain. Aldeaseca (Spain)
- Coordinates: 41°02′58″N 4°49′03″W
- Country: Spain
- Autonomous community: Castile and León
- Province: Ávila

Area
  - Total: 24.25 km^{2} (9.36 sq mi)
- Elevation: 859 m (2,818 ft)

Population (2025-01-01)
  - Total: 211
  - Density: 8.70/km^{2} (22.5/sq mi)
- Time zone: UTC+1 (CET)
  - Summer (DST): UTC+2 (CEST)
- Website: Official website

Aldeaseca is a municipality located in the province of Ávila, Castile and León, Spain. According to the 2025 census (INE), the municipality had a population of 211 inhabitants.

== Population ==
Historical population
Year	Pop.	±% p.a.
2023	210	—
2024	203	−3.33%
2025	211	+3.94%
Source: INE
