= Juan de Zapata =

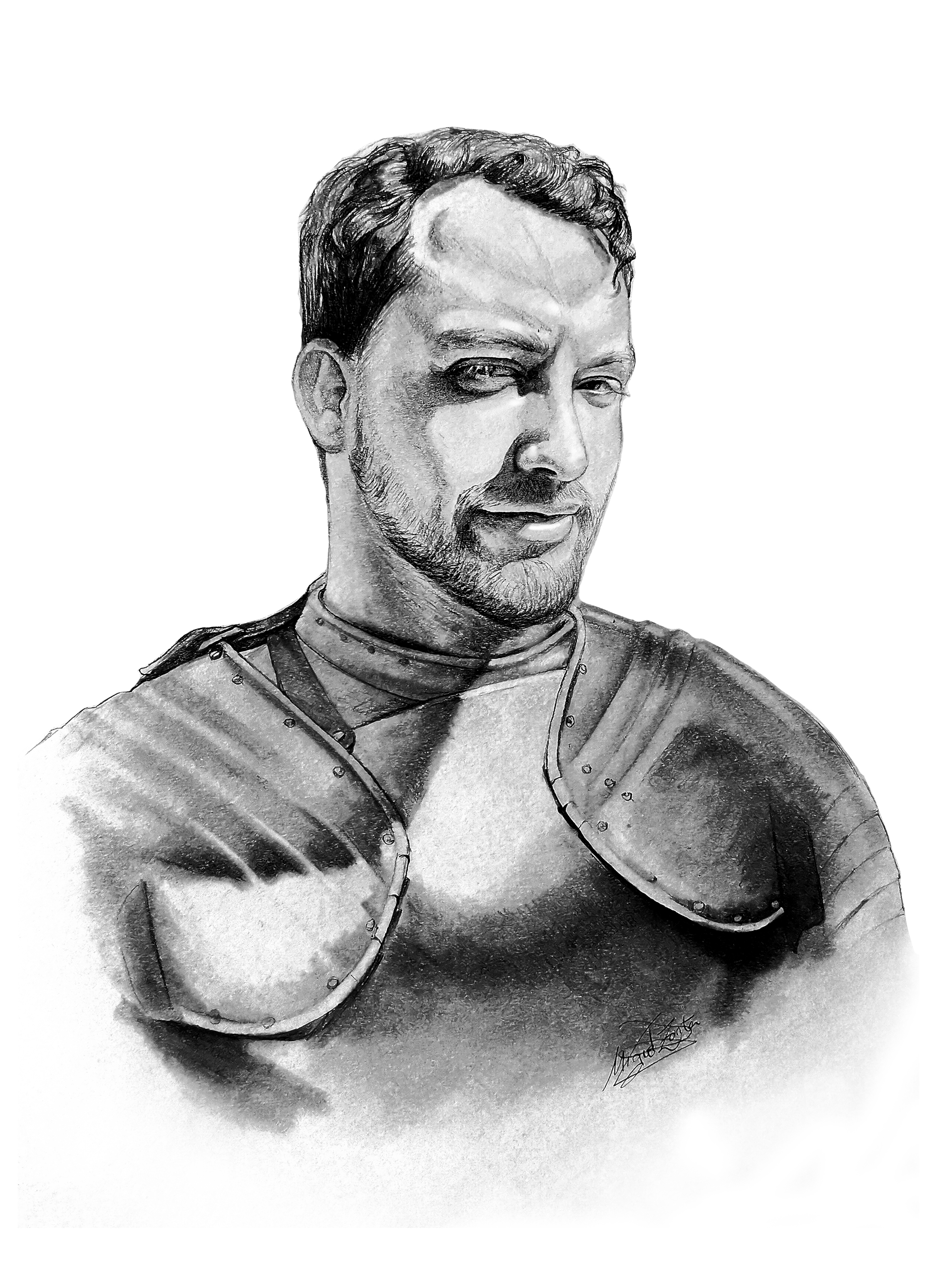
Juan de Zapata

Juan de Zapata (fl. 1520s) was a leader of the Revolt of the Comuneros in Spain.

He was excluded from the royal pardon to the rebels.
