= Antonio de Zúñiga =

Antonio de Zúñiga y Guzman,(c.1458 – 1533), Prior of Castile, Order of Saint John of Jerusalem, Plasencia, Spain, was the general of the Royal Army against the Revolt of the Comuneros and a Viceroy of Catalonia from 1523 - 1525.

== Family background ==
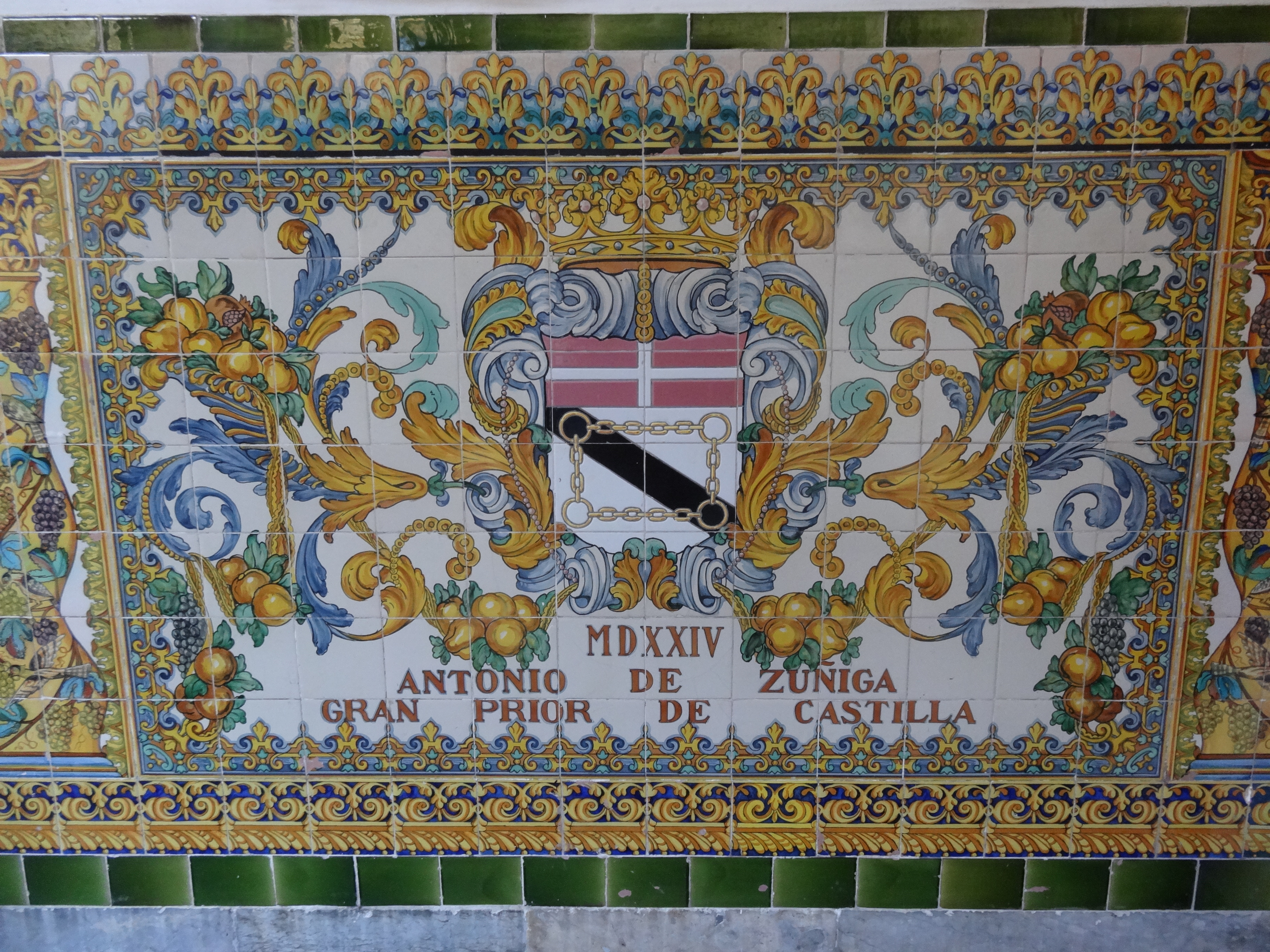
Antonio de Zuñiga (Decorated tiles of the Capitania General de Barcelona)

He was one of the sons of Pedro de Zuñiga y Manrique de Lara, 3rd Count of Plasencia.

His mother, Teresa de Guzman y de Guzman, daughter of Juan Alonso Perez de Guzman y Orozco, died in 1458. Then, Antonio became thus the step son of Isabel de Zuñiga y Pimentel.

== Diplomatic services ==
In 1519, Antonio took part in the diplomatic meetings headed by Mercurino Gattinara at Montpellier, France, with king Francis I of France representatives.

== Revolt of the Comuneros ==
In 1521 Antonio was general of the Royal Army who carried out military actions against the rebellious groups at Torrelobaton, Villalar and Toledo during the Revolt of the Comuneros. One of the results was that the Bishop of Zamora, Antonio de Acuña, was executed near Simancas.
