= Pedro Laso de la Vega =

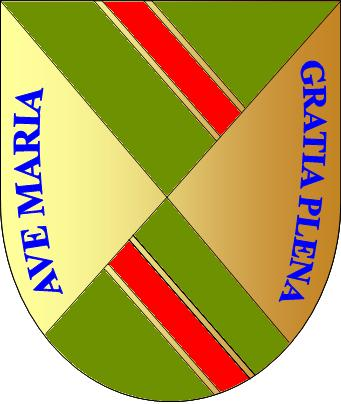
Coat of Arms of the House of Lasso de la Vega.

Pedro Laso de la Vega (before 1520–1554) was one of the people elected as councilors for Toledo, Spain at the start of the Revolt of the Comuneros. He along with Juan de Padilla was one of the original leaders of the revolt but he later turned against it as it shifted to a position more in opposition to the interests of the nobles.

== Sources ==
- Harold Livermore. A History of Spain. New York: Grove Press, 1958. p. 211.
