= 1521 =

1521 in various calendars
- Gregorian calendar: 1521; MDXXI
- Ab urbe condita: 2274
- Armenian calendar: 970; ԹՎ ՋՀ
- Assyrian calendar: 6271
- Balinese saka calendar: 1442–1443
- Bengali calendar: 927–928
- Berber calendar: 2471
- English Regnal year: 12 Hen. 8 – 13 Hen. 8
- Buddhist calendar: 2065
- Burmese calendar: 883
- Byzantine calendar: 7029–7030
- Chinese calendar: 庚辰年 (Metal Dragon); 4218 or 4011 — to — 辛巳年 (Metal Snake); 4219 or 4012
- Coptic calendar: 1237–1238
- Discordian calendar: 2687
- Ethiopian calendar: 1513–1514
- Hebrew calendar: 5281–5282
- Hindu calendars
- Vikram Samvat: 1577–1578
- Shaka Samvat: 1442–1443
- Kali Yuga: 4621–4622
- Holocene calendar: 11521
- Igbo calendar: 521–522
- Iranian calendar: 899–900
- Islamic calendar: 927–928
- Japanese calendar: Eishō 18 / Daiei 1 (大永元年)
- Javanese calendar: 1438–1439
- Julian calendar: 1521; MDXXI
- Korean calendar: 3854
- Minguo calendar: 391 before ROC 民前391年
- Nanakshahi calendar: 53
- Thai solar calendar: 2063–2064
- Tibetan calendar: ལྕགས་ཕོ་འབྲུག་ལོ་ (male Iron-Dragon); 1647 or 1266 or 494 — to — ལྕགས་མོ་སྦྲུལ་ལོ་ (female Iron-Snake); 1648 or 1267 or 495

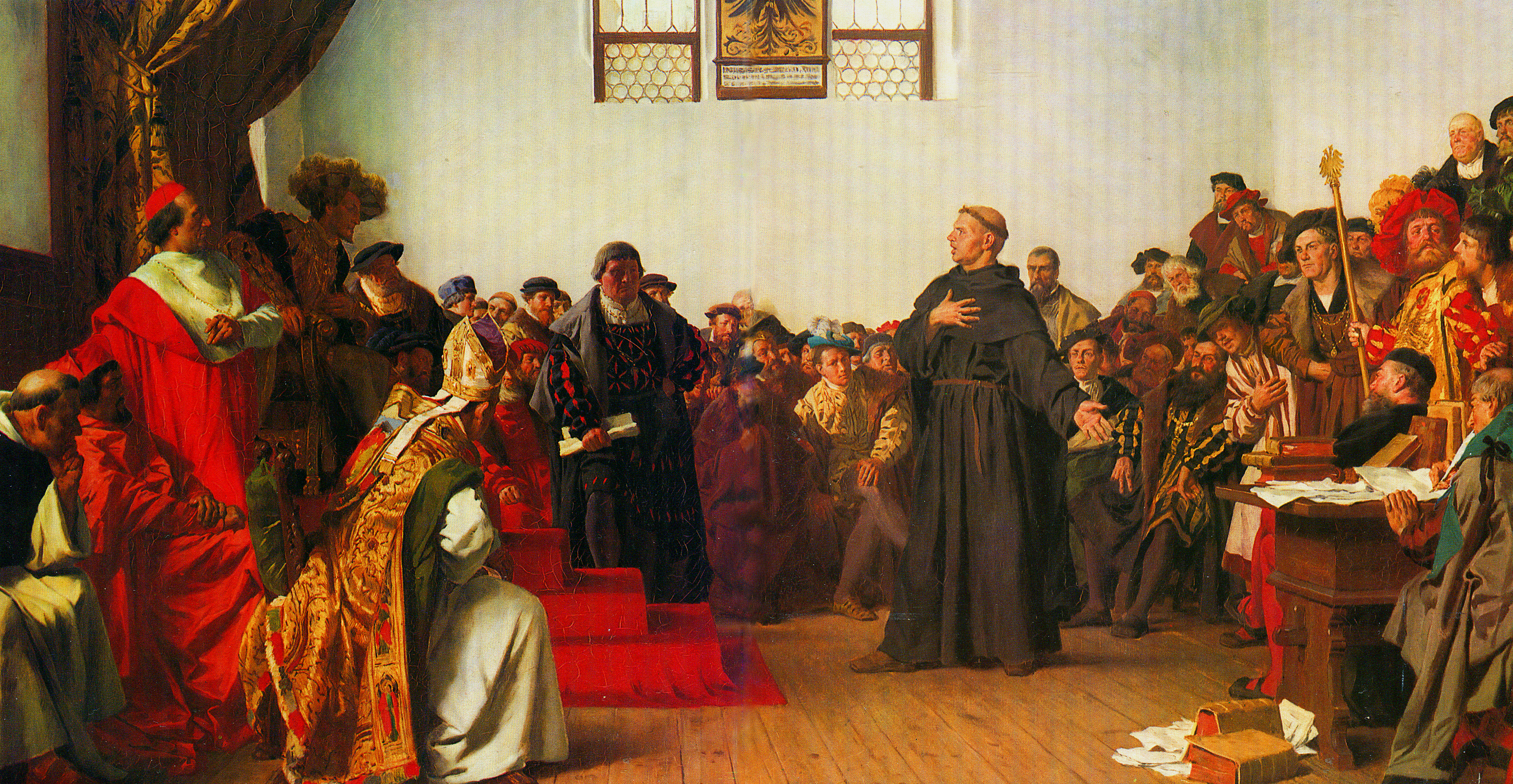
January 22: The Diet of Worms parliament is opened by Emperor Charles V in the German city of Worms.

1521 (MDXXI) was a common year starting on Tuesday of the Julian calendar, the 1521st year of the Common Era (CE) and Anno Domini (AD) designations, the 521st year of the 2nd millennium, the 21st year of the 16th century, and the 2nd year of the 1520s decade.

== Events ==
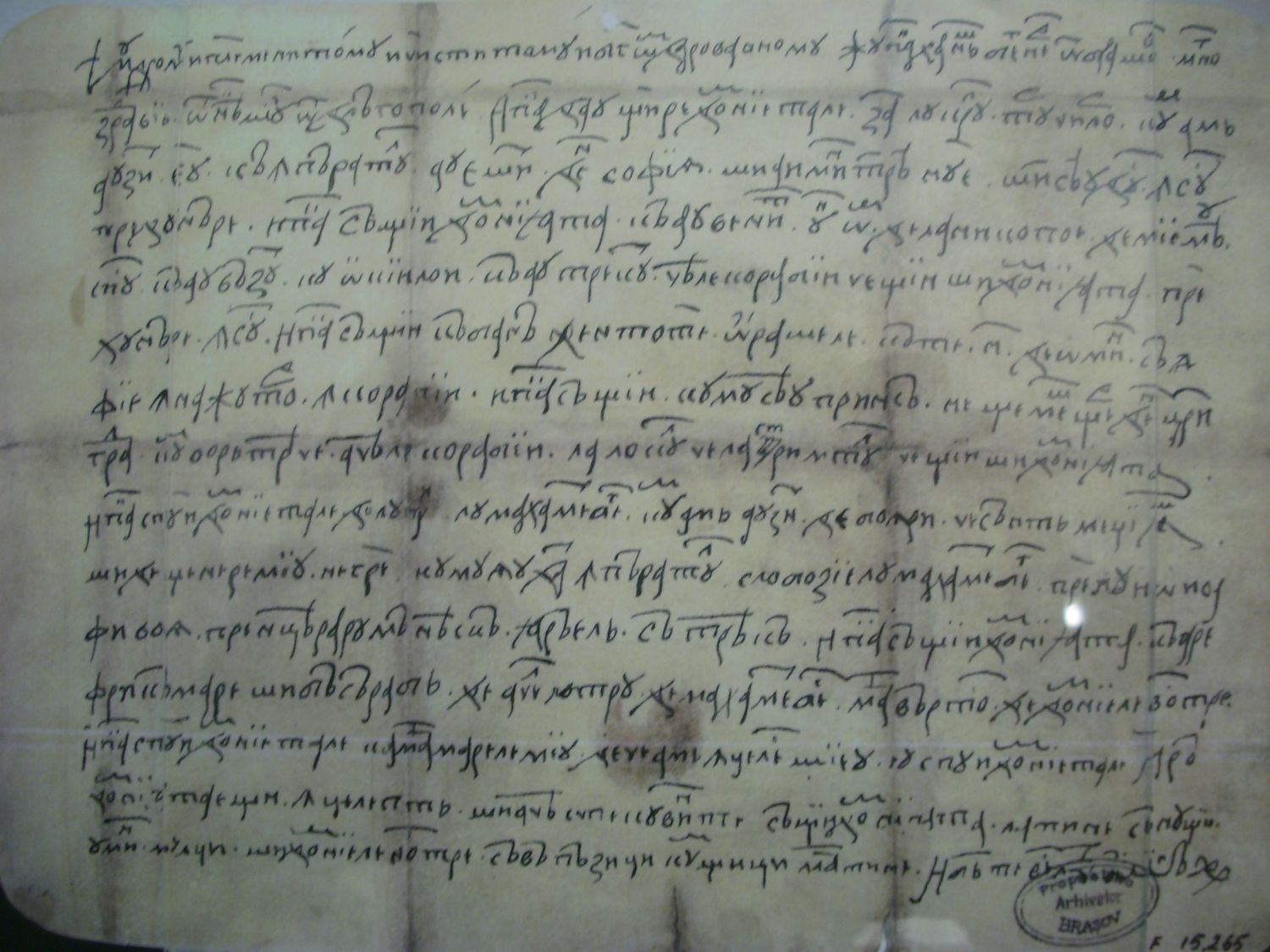
Neacșu's letter, the oldest surviving document written in Romanian has the oldest appearance of the word "Rumanian"

=== January–March ===
- January 3 – Pope Leo X excommunicates Martin Luther, in the papal bull Decet Romanum Pontificem.
- January 22 – Charles V, Holy Roman Emperor, opens the Diet of Worms in Worms, Germany.
- January 27 – Suleiman the Magnificent suppresses a revolt by the ruler of Damascus, Janbirdi al-Ghazali.
- February 2 – The Nydala Abbey Bloodbath takes place at Nydala Abbey, Sweden; the abbot and many monks are murdered by Danes.
- March 6
  - Ferdinand Magellan makes the first European contact with Guam, most likely landing in Tumon.
  - Martin Luther is summoned to appear before the Diet of Worms.
- March 16 – Ferdinand Magellan reaches the Philippines, in eastern Samar. In 1 month 11 days would find himself a surprise
- March 31 – The First Mass in the Philippines is held.

=== April–June ===
- April 7
  - Ferdinand Magellan arrives at Cebu.
  - Martin Luther preaches an inflammatory sermon to students at Erfurt, while on his way to Worms.
- April 16–18 – Martin Luther is examined before Emperor Charles V and the Diet of Worms, where he refuses to recant his writings and allegedly proclaims, "Here I stand", regarding his belief in the Bible alone, as the standard of Christian doctrine.
- April 23 – Revolt of the Comuneros – Battle of Villalar: Castilian royalists defeat the rebels. Juan López de Padilla, Francisco Maldonado, and Juan Bravo are executed the following day as the leaders of the rebels.
- April 26 – Martin Luther leaves Worms and disappears for around a year – he is rumored to be murdered, but is actually in hiding at the Wartburg castle.
- April 27 – Battle of Mactan: Ferdinand Magellan is killed in the Philippines when he confronts Lapulapu, the chief of the island.
- April or May – Battle of Tunmen in Tuen Mun (present-day Hong Kong): The Ming Dynasty navy defeats the Portuguese navy (arguably the first Sino-European battle in world history).
- May 17 – Edward Stafford, 3rd Duke of Buckingham, is executed for treason in Tower Hill.
- May 20 – At the Battle of Pampeluna in Spain, and alliance of forces from French and the Kingdom of Navarre forces defeat those of Spain.
- May 25 – The Diet of Worms ends when Charles V, Holy Roman Emperor issues the Edict of Worms, declaring Martin Luther an outlaw and banning his literature.
- May 27 – After the death of his cousin, Prince Zhu Houcong became the new Ming dynasty Emperor of China, taking the imperial name of the Emperor Jiajing<.
- June 25 – Suleiman the Magnificent begins the siege of Belgrade.
- June 29 or 30 – The oldest surviving dateable document written primarily in the Romanian language: Neacșu's letter, written by a trader from Câmpulung, to Johannes Benkner, the mayor of Brașov, warning that the Ottoman Empire is preparing its troops to cross into Wallachia and Transylvania; the script used is Romanian Cyrillic.
- June 30 – Battle of Esquiroz: French forces under André de Foix, fighting for the exiled King of Navarre Henri d'Albret, are defeated by the Spanish, and forced to abandon their attempt to recover Henri's kingdom.

=== July–September ===
- July 15 — San Juan Bautista is founded as the new capital of the archipelago of Puerto Rico.
- August 13 – Fall of Tenochtitlan: Cuauhtémoc surrenders to Cortés, thus incorporating the Aztec Empire into the Spanish Empire and ending the Late Postclassic period in Mesoamerica.
- August 20 – The Italian War of 1521–1526 breaks out between Charles V, Holy Roman Emperor, and Francis I of France as Henry III of Nassau-Breda leads Imperial troops on an invasion of northeastern France.
- August 29 – Belgrade is captured by the Ottoman army of Suleiman the Magnificent.
- September 12 – In the Italian War, the Holy Roman Empire abandons its siege of the French-controlled city of Parma after 17 days.
- September 15
  - Gazi Husrev Bey replaces Bali-beg Jahjapašić as the Ottoman Governor of Bosnia.
  - Teodosie becomes the new Voivode of Wallachia, at the capital, Targoviste, now in Romania.

=== October–December ===
- October 25 – The Revolt of the Comuneros, an uprising by citizens of the Kingdom of Castile against the rule of Spain's King Carlos I, ends as the comuneros surrender Toledo.
- November 23 – Spanish–German–Papal forces under Prospero Colonna force French Marshal Odet de Lautrec to abandon Milan.
- December 27 – The Zwickau prophets arrive in Wittenberg, disturbing the peace and spreading the idea of rejecting infant baptism.

=== Date unknown ===
- Jacopo Berengario da Carpi publishes Commentaria cum amplissimus additionibus super anatomiam Mundini in Bologna, including observation of the vermiform appendix.
- The Grand Duchy of Ryazan is annexed by the Grand Duchy of Moscow.
- The Swedish Army was founded by Gustav Vasa.

== Births ==
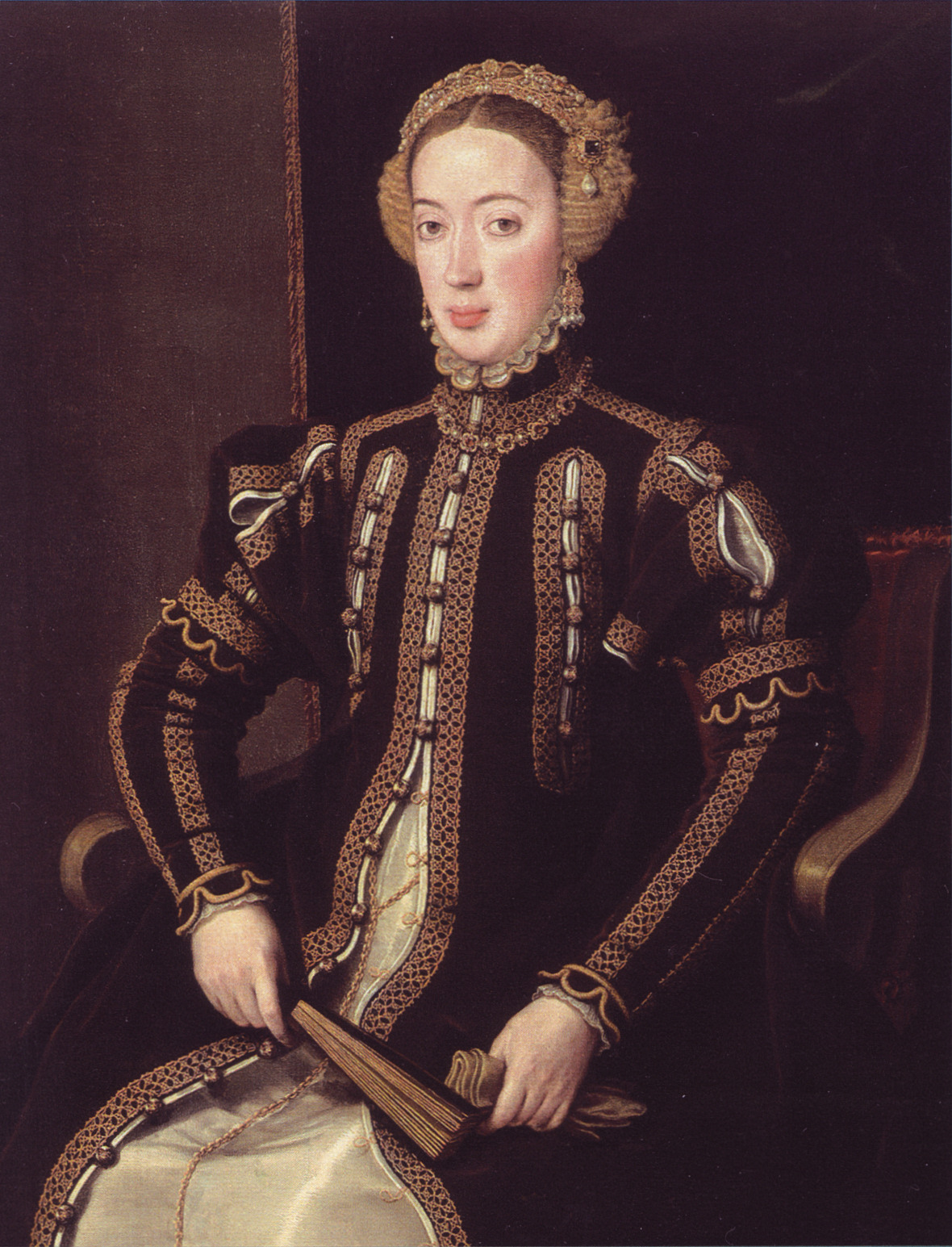
Maria of Portugal, Duchess of Viseu

- March 21 – Maurice, Elector of Saxony (d. 1553)
- April 5 – Francesco Laparelli, Italian architect (d. 1570)
- April 14 – Johann Marbach, German theologian (d. 1581)
- April 18 – François de Coligny d'Andelot, French general (d. 1569)
- May 8 – Petrus Canisius, Dutch Jesuit (d. 1597)
- May 10 – John Ernest, Duke of Saxe-Coburg, (d. 1553)
- June 8 – Maria of Portugal, Duchess of Viseu, daughter of King Manuel I (d. 1577)
- June 21 – John II, Duke of Schleswig-Holstein-Haderslev (d. 1580)
- August 4 – Pope Urban VII (d. 1590)
- August 19 – Lodovico Guicciardini, Italian historian (d. 1589)
- October 1 – Frederick Magnus I, Count of Solms-Laubach, (d. 1561)
- November 21 – Edmund Sheffield, 1st Baron Sheffield, English baron (d. 1549)
- November 29 – Marcantonio Maffei, Italian Catholic archbishop and cardinal (d. 1583)
- December 1 – Takeda Shingen, Japanese warlord (d. 1573)
- December 13 – Pope Sixtus V (d. 1590)
- date unknown
  - Anne Askew, English Protestant martyr (d. 1546)
  - John Aylmer, English divine (d. 1594)
  - Sue Harukata, Japanese retainer and later daimyō under Ōuchi Yoshitaka (d. 1555)
  - Thomas Chaloner, English statesman and poet (d. 1565)
  - Philippe de Monte, Flemish composer (d. 1603)
  - Rokkaku Yoshikata, Japanese daimyō (d. 1598)
  - Thomas Wyatt the Younger, English rebel (d. 1554)
- possible
  - Catherine Howard, fifth queen of Henry VIII of England, (b. between 1518 and 1524; d. 1542)

== Deaths ==
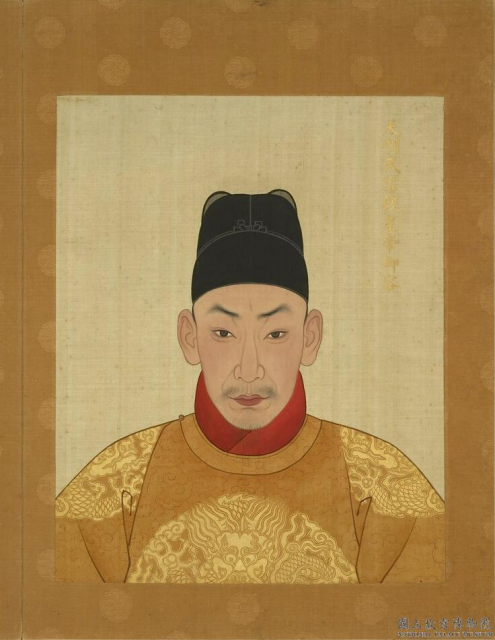
Zhengde Emperor

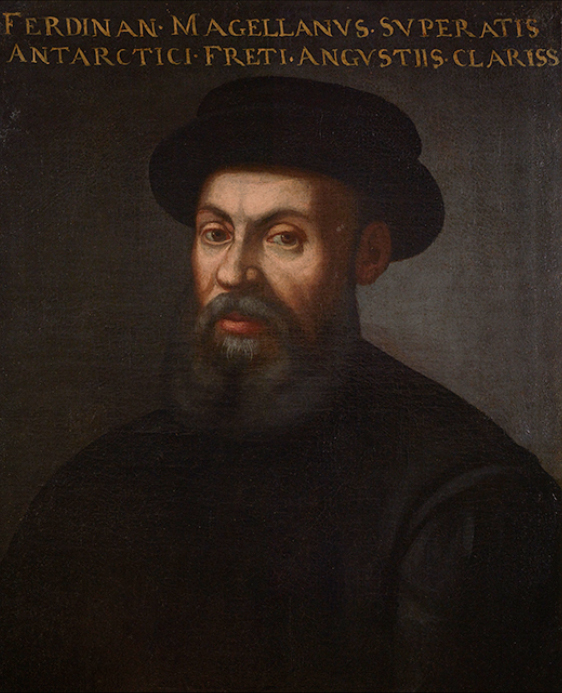
Ferdinand Magellan

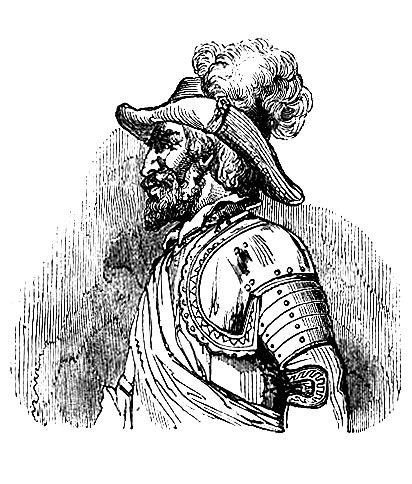
Juan Ponce de León

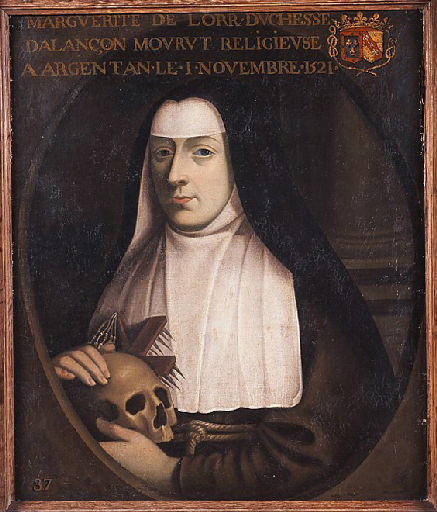
Saint Margaret of Lorraine

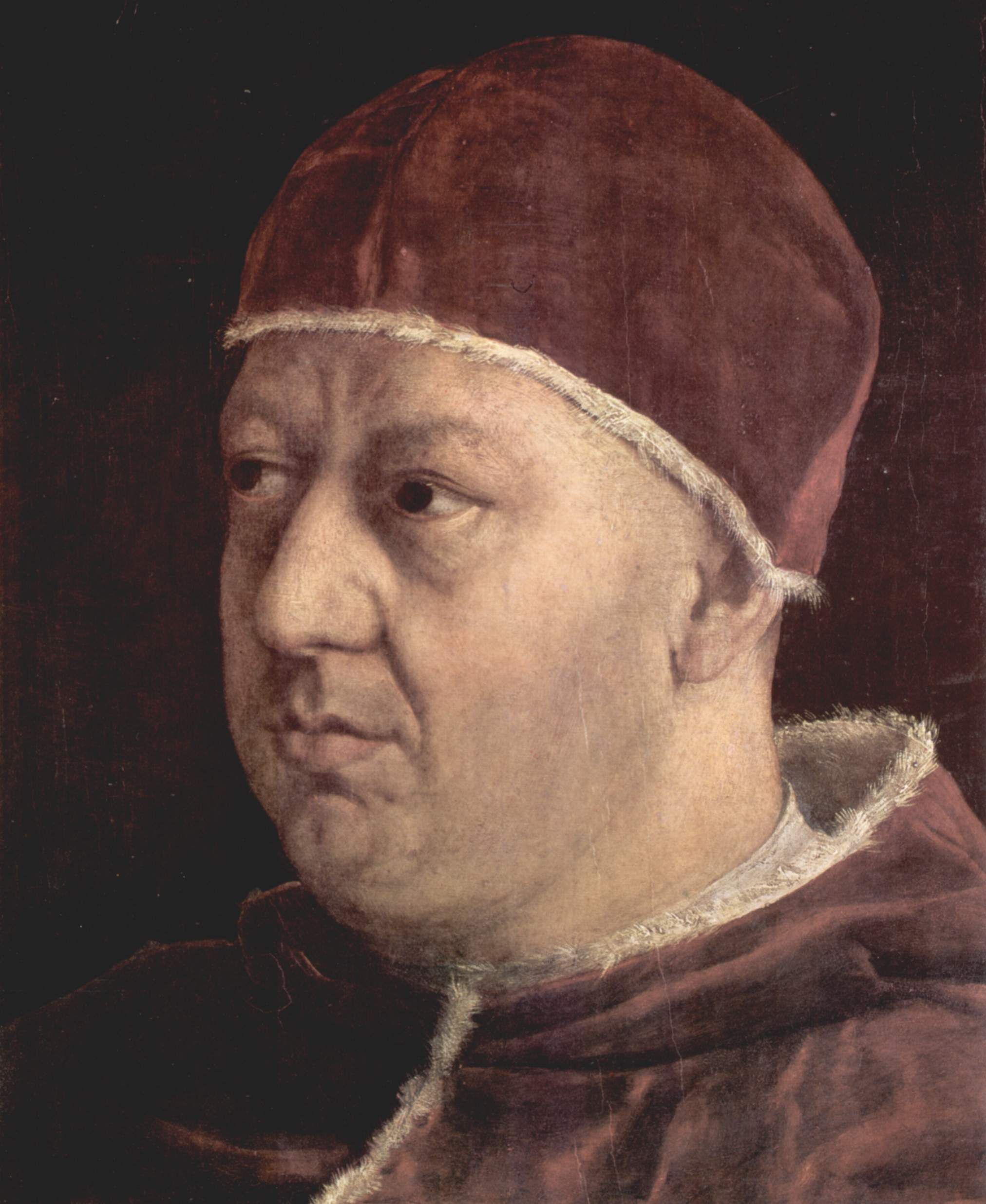
Pope Leo X

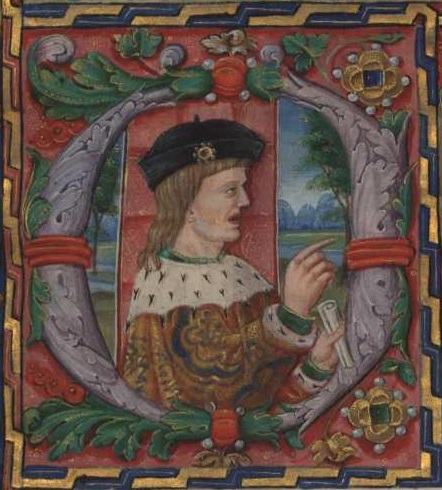
King Manuel I of Portugal

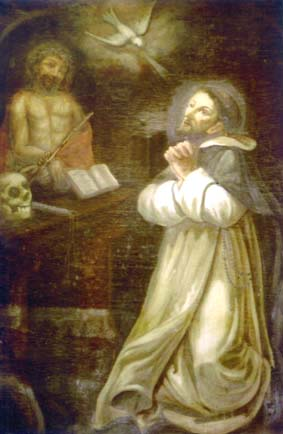
Blessed Domenico Spadafora

- January 6 – Cardinal William de Croÿ (b. 1497)
- January 15 – John II, Duke of Cleves (b. 1458)
- April 20 – Zhengde Emperor of China (b. 1491)
- April 24 – Spanish rebels (executed)
  - Juan López de Padilla
  - Juan Bravo
  - Francisco Maldonado
- April 27 – Ferdinand Magellan, Portuguese explorer (b. 1480)
- April 28 – Suzanne, Duchess of Bourbon (b. 1491)
- May 10 – Sebastian Brant, German humanist and satirist (b. 1457)
- May 17 – Edward Stafford, 3rd Duke of Buckingham (executed) (b. 1478)
- June 15 – Tamás Bakócz, Hungarian Catholic cardinal and statesman (b. 1442)
- June 22 – Leonardo Loredan, Doge of Venice (b. 1436)
- July – Juan Ponce de León, Spanish conquistador (b. 1460)
- July 9 – Raffaele Riario, Italian cardinal (b. 1461)
- August 27 – Josquin des Prez, Flemish composer (b. c. 1450)
- October 7 – Margaret of Anhalt-Köthen, Princess of Anhalt by birth, Duchess consort of Saxony (b. 1494)
- October 22 – Edward Poynings, Lord Deputy to King Henry VII of England (b. 1459)
- October 24 – Robert Fayrfax, English Renaissance composer (b. 1464)
- November 2 – Margaret of Lorraine, French Duchess of Alençon, Roman Catholic nun and blessed (b. 1463)
- December 1 – Pope Leo X (b. 1475)
- December 13 – King Manuel I of Portugal (b. 1469)
- December 21 – Domenico Spadafora, Italian Roman Catholic priest and blessed (b. 1450)
1521 in art

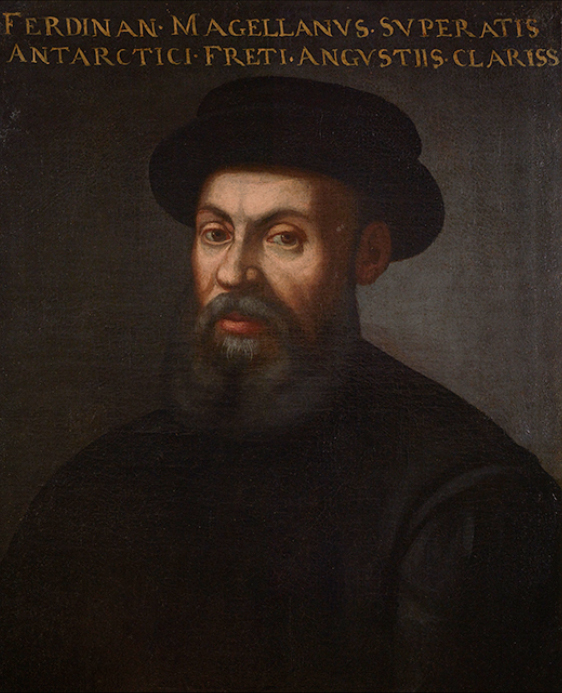
March–April: Ferdinand Magellan's voyage around the world.

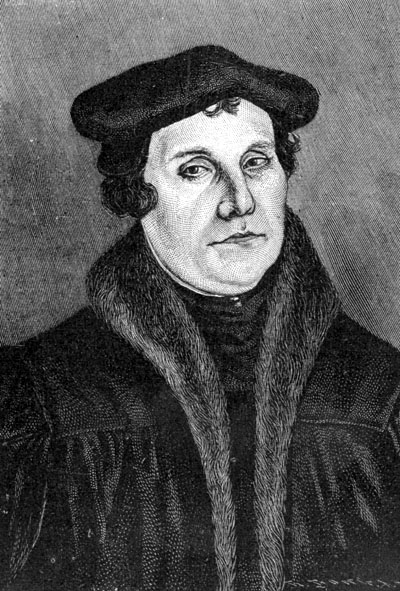
May 25: Martin Luther outlawed.

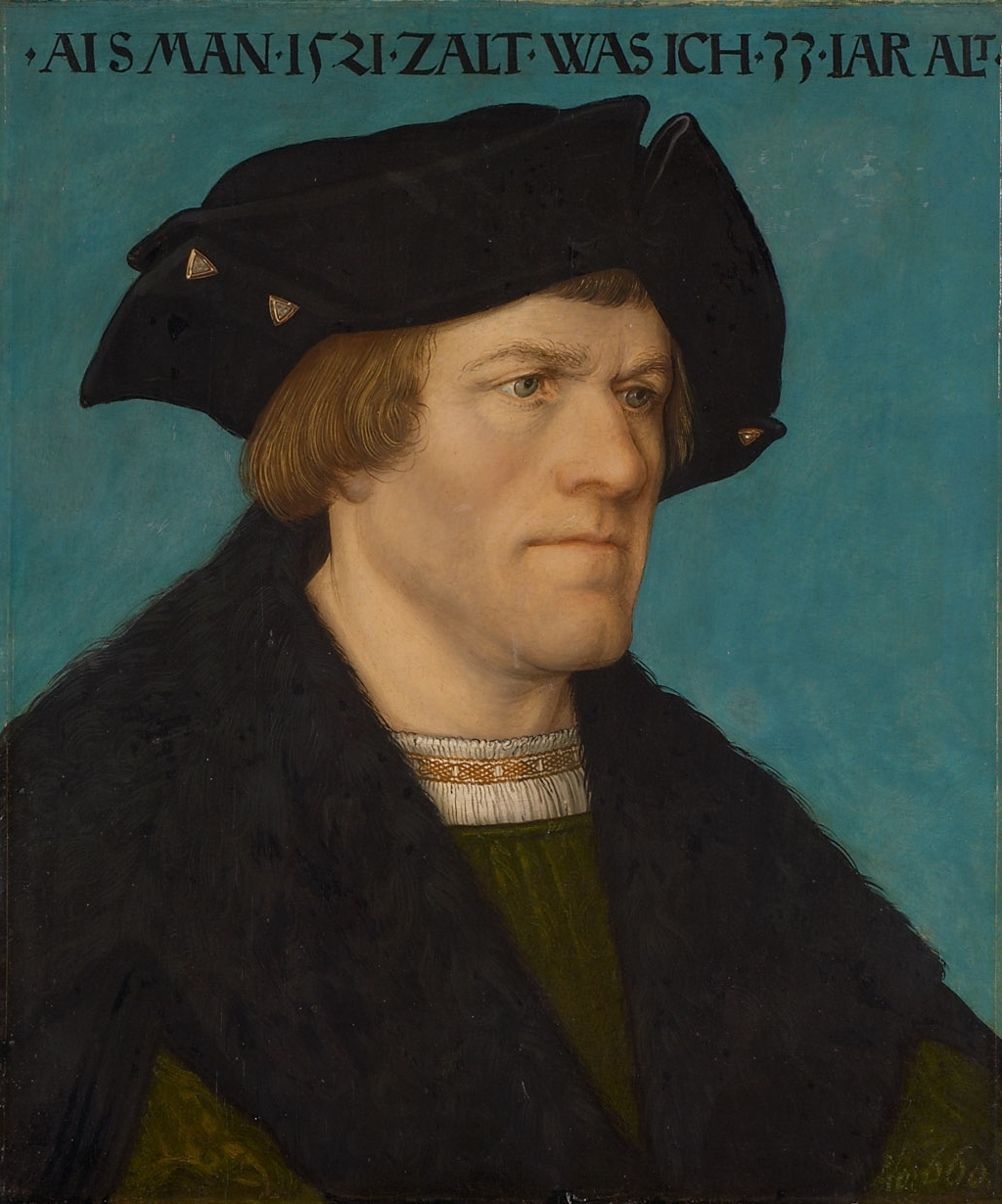
Hans Maler zu Schwaz, Portrait of a beardless man with the inscription:
"ALS MAN. 1521. ZALT. WAS. ICH. 33. IAR ALT"
(mutatis mutandis to English: "as we had in 1521, I was 33 years old)

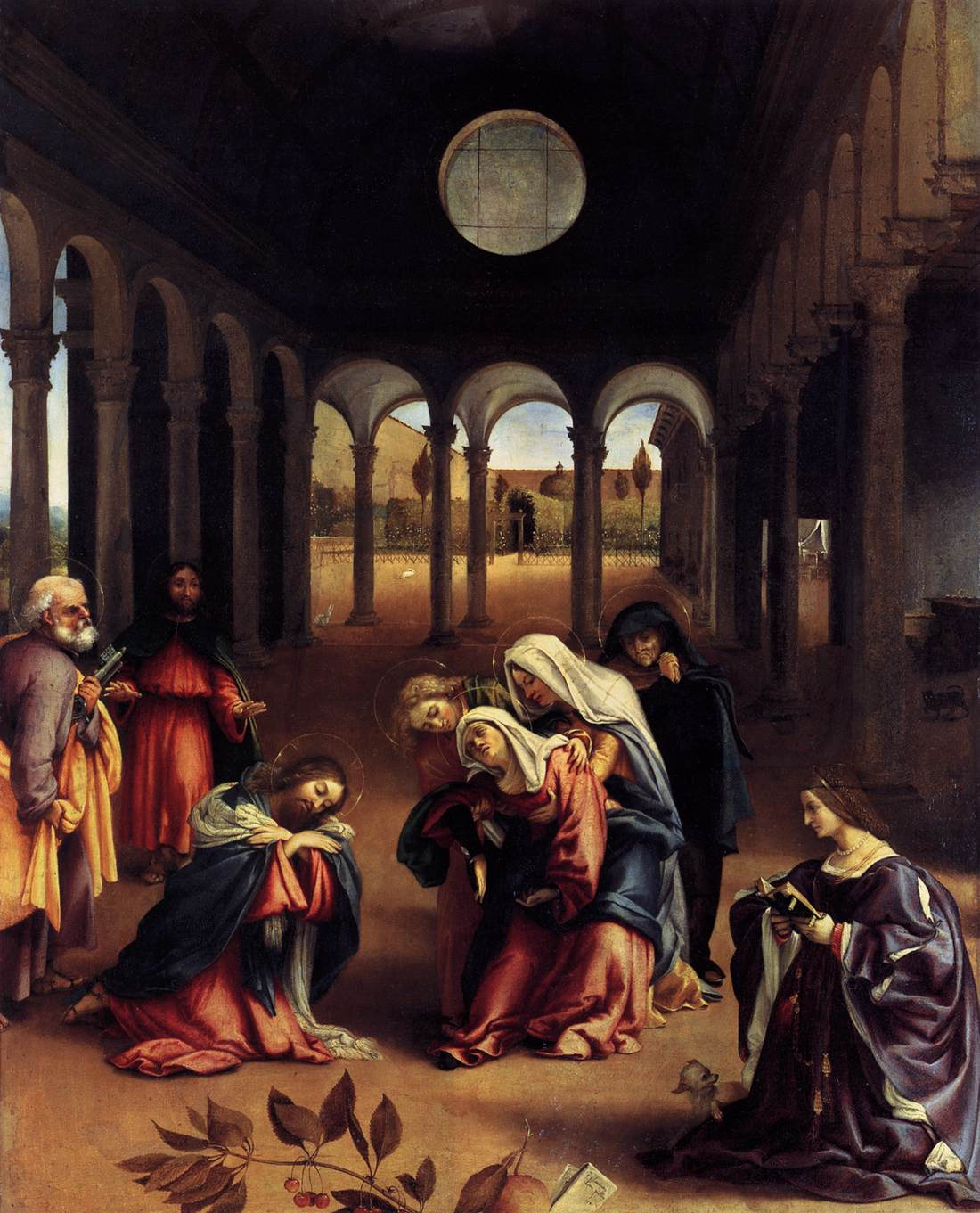
Lorenzo Lotto, Christ Taking Leave of His Mother
