= Castile and León Day =

Holiday celebrated in Castile and León, Spain

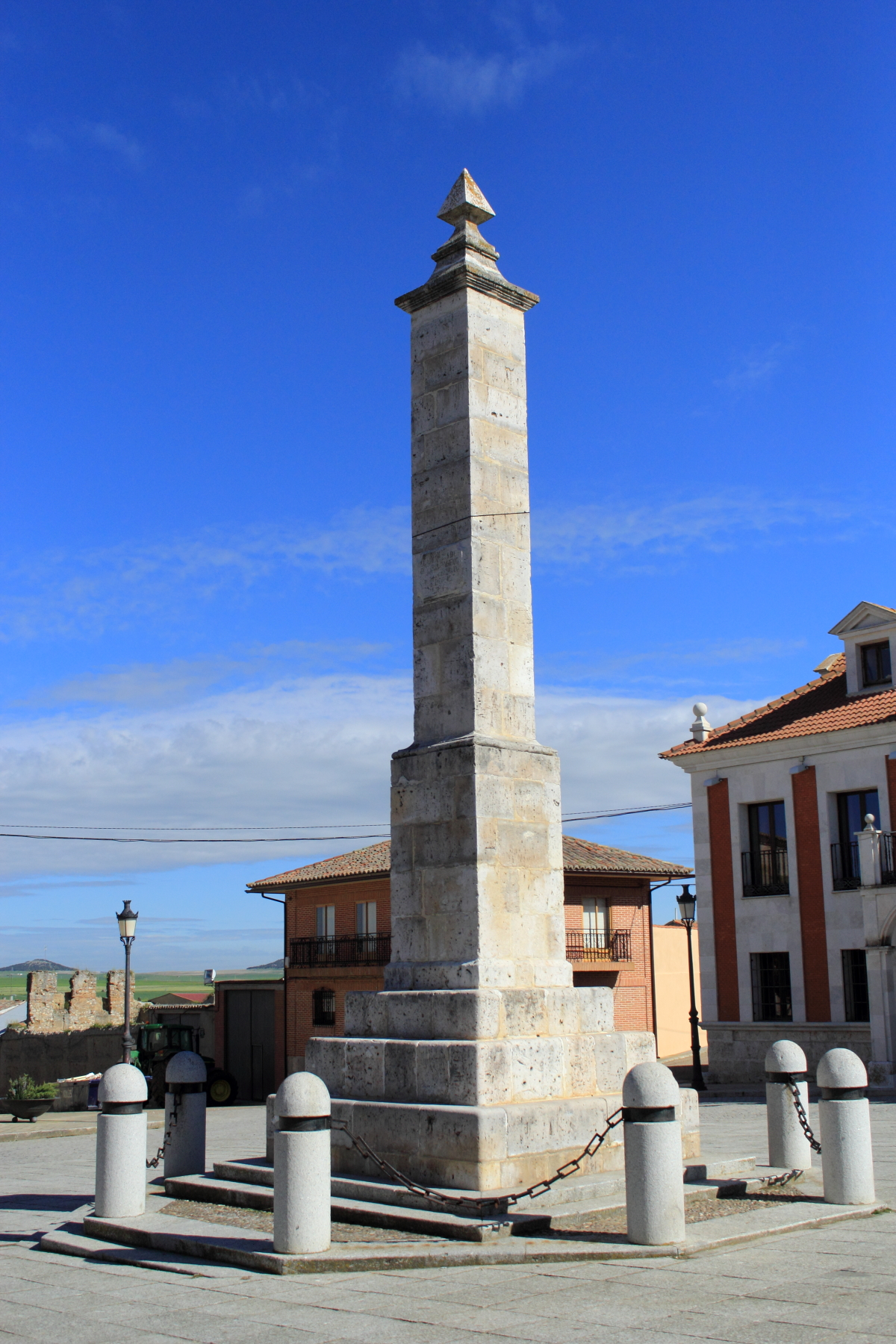
- Monolith "The Obelisk", erected in 1889 in memory of María Pacheco, Juan López de Padilla, Juan Bravo and Francisco Maldonado
- Official name: Spanish: Día de Castilla y León
- Also called: Día Nacional de Castilla (National Day of Castile), Día de Villalar (Villalar Day)
- Observed by: Castile and León, Spain
- Type: Historical, National
- Observances: Concerts, Fairs, Floral offerings, Folkloric dances, Picnics, Political speeches, Street theatre
- Date: 23 April
- Next time: 23 April 2027
- Frequency: annual
- First time: 1976

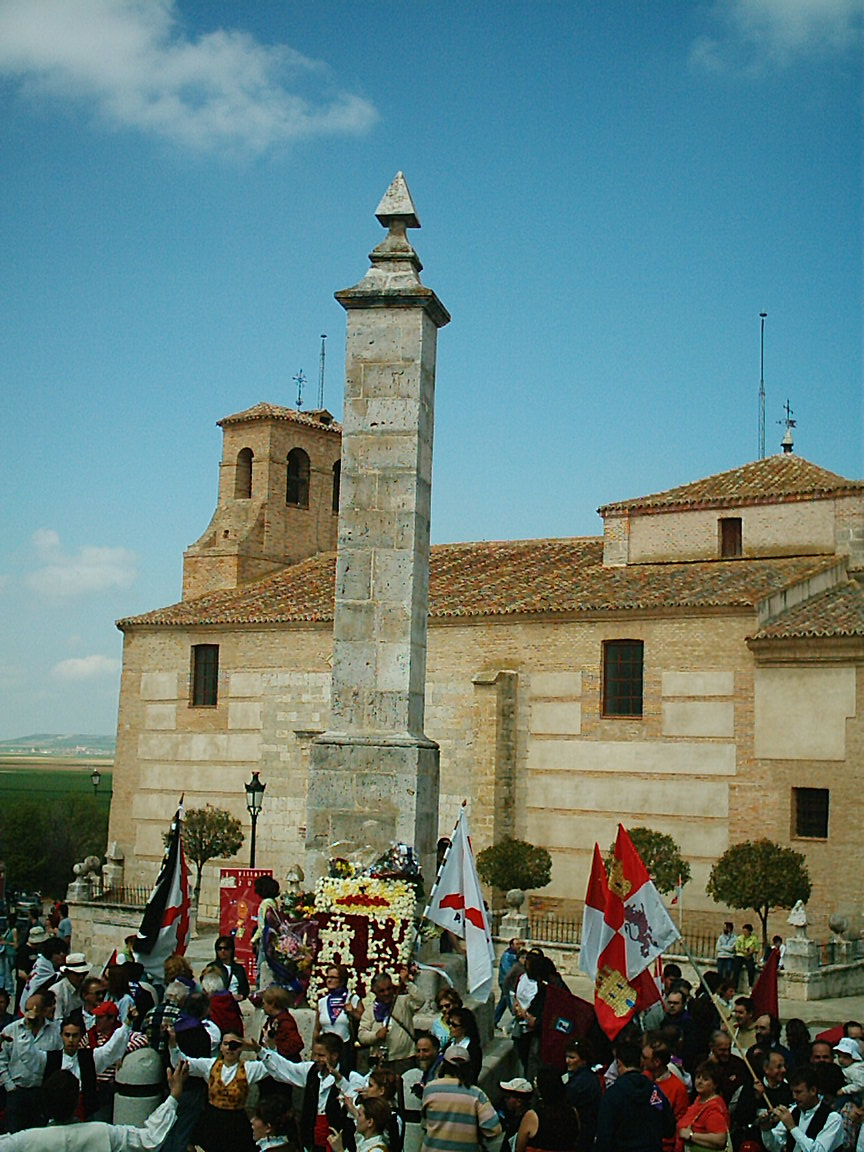
Monolith to the Comuneros in Villalar

Castile and León Day (Spanish: Día de Castilla y León) is a holiday celebrated on 23 April in the autonomous community of Castile and León, a subdivision of Spain. The date is the anniversary of the Battle of Villalar, in which Castilian rebels called Comuneros were dealt a crushing defeat by the royalist forces of King Charles I in the Revolt of the Comuneros on 23 April 1521.

Commemoration of the Battle of Villalar was closely associated with liberal politics in Spain from the late 18th century until the 1970s, as conservatives generally sympathized with the royal government. With the demise of General Franco's government, the day has broadened to a more general celebration of Castilian nationalism rather than only liberal politics. The government of Castile and León established 23 April as an official holiday in 1986, although festivals have been held yearly since a decade earlier at Villalar.

23 April is also St. George's Day, there being some crossover between the two holidays.

== Origins ==
The birth of the Battle of Villalar as a rallying symbol for Spanish liberals dates back to the late 17th and early 18th centuries. León del Arroyal, an illustrious economist and protoliberal, stated that Villalar was "the last breath of Castilian freedom" in the latter half of the 18th century. The Castilian Comuneros received their first major recognition during the Trienio Liberal, the three years of liberal government from 1820-1823. Resistance fighter Juan Martín Díez "El Empecinado" organized an expedition to Villalar to search for the remains of Padilla, Bravo, and Maldonado, the executed leaders of the revolt. These events took its climax with a festival and celebration of the Comuneros Revolt in the plaza of Villalar on 23 April 1821. Members of left-leaning secret societies often referenced the revolt in their names, such as "Los Comuneros" or "Sons of Padilla." They also employed the purple banner, the flag flown by the comuneros rebels. While dormant for a time after the Bourbon Restoration to the Spanish throne, occasional recognition of Villalar and the Comuneros came from some of the short-lived liberal governments of the period. For instance, President Francisco Pi y Margall of the First Spanish Republic stated that "Castile was among the first nations of Spain who lost their freedoms in Villalar under the first king of the House of Austria."

In the early years of the 20th century there were other attempts to celebrate at Villalar. Among them was a proposal by José María Zorita Díez, a liberal deputy for Valladolid, who made a special request for funds to commemorate the Battle of Villalar. There were also various requests and preparations to celebrate the fourth centenary of the Battle in 1923; the city council of Palencia proposed in early 1923 that "on next 23 April, all the representatives of Castile go to the fields of Villalar and swear upon the Castilian Holy Grail, at the scene of the Fall... On the same day and at the same time all the cities of Castile dedicate a minute of silence to the heroes of Villalar." Little came of these attempts to celebrate 23 April, however.

== History and official recognition ==
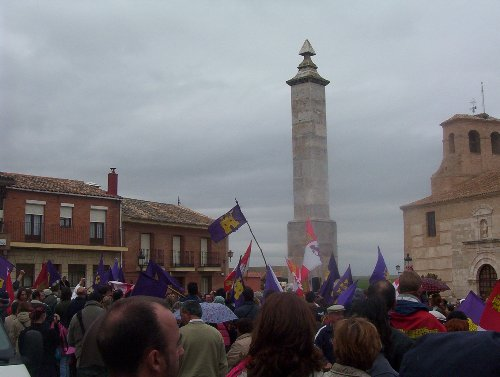
The 2005 celebration in Villalar

By the early 70s, much of the reputation of the Comuneros had been rehabilitated after generally positive portrayals by historians such as José Antonio Maravall, Juan Ignacio Gutiérrez Nieto, and Joseph Pérez. In 1976, a gathering of about 400 people met at Villalar. While they were violently dispersed by the Guardia Civil, the meeting the next year was far larger, with almost 20,000 attendees to celebrate the Battle and organize Castilian groups. The meetings continued on an unofficial basis until 1986, when the government of the then-recently recognized autonomous community of Castile and León granted its official stamp of approval.

On 22 April 1987, a sixteen years-old punk died in Villalar, during a fight between punks and heavys at the town. The victim was stab-wounded twice. The killer was detained on 27 April, and recognized the aggression. On late September that year, the aggressor hanged himself to death in Villanubla Prison, Valladolid, allegedly due to a depression episode.

== Modern observance ==
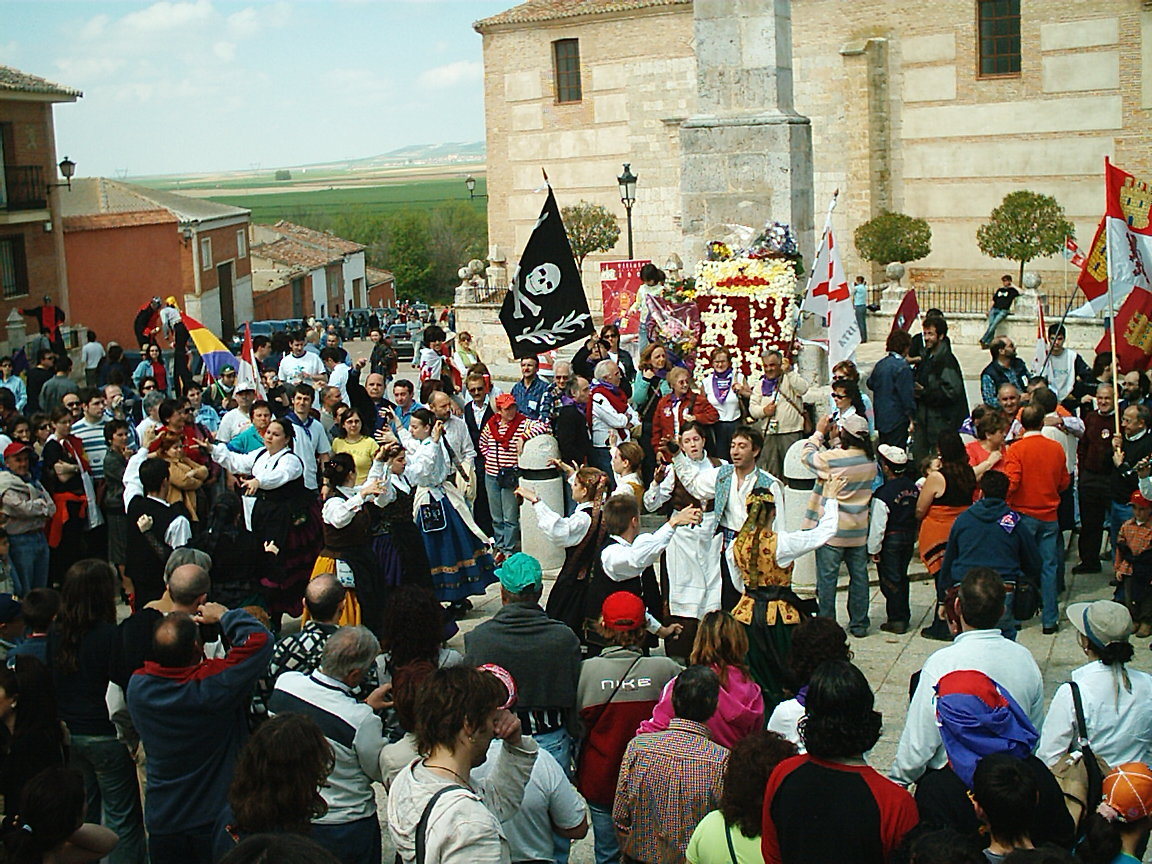
The 2006 floral offering to the Comuneros in Villalar

The acts normally begin on the evening of 22 April, with performances by musical groups and a zone of free camping for the night. On the morning of 23 April the main ceremonies take place alongside the monolith erected in tribute to the Comuneros. Each political party makes a floral offering to the monolith and gives a speech. Throughout the day, political activities and speeches alternate with dances, music concerts, sports, exhibitions, street theatre, and other Castilian-themed recreational activities.

The entity responsible for organizing the infrastructure needed for the celebration in modern times is the "Villalar Foundation of Castile and León."

=== Attendance ===
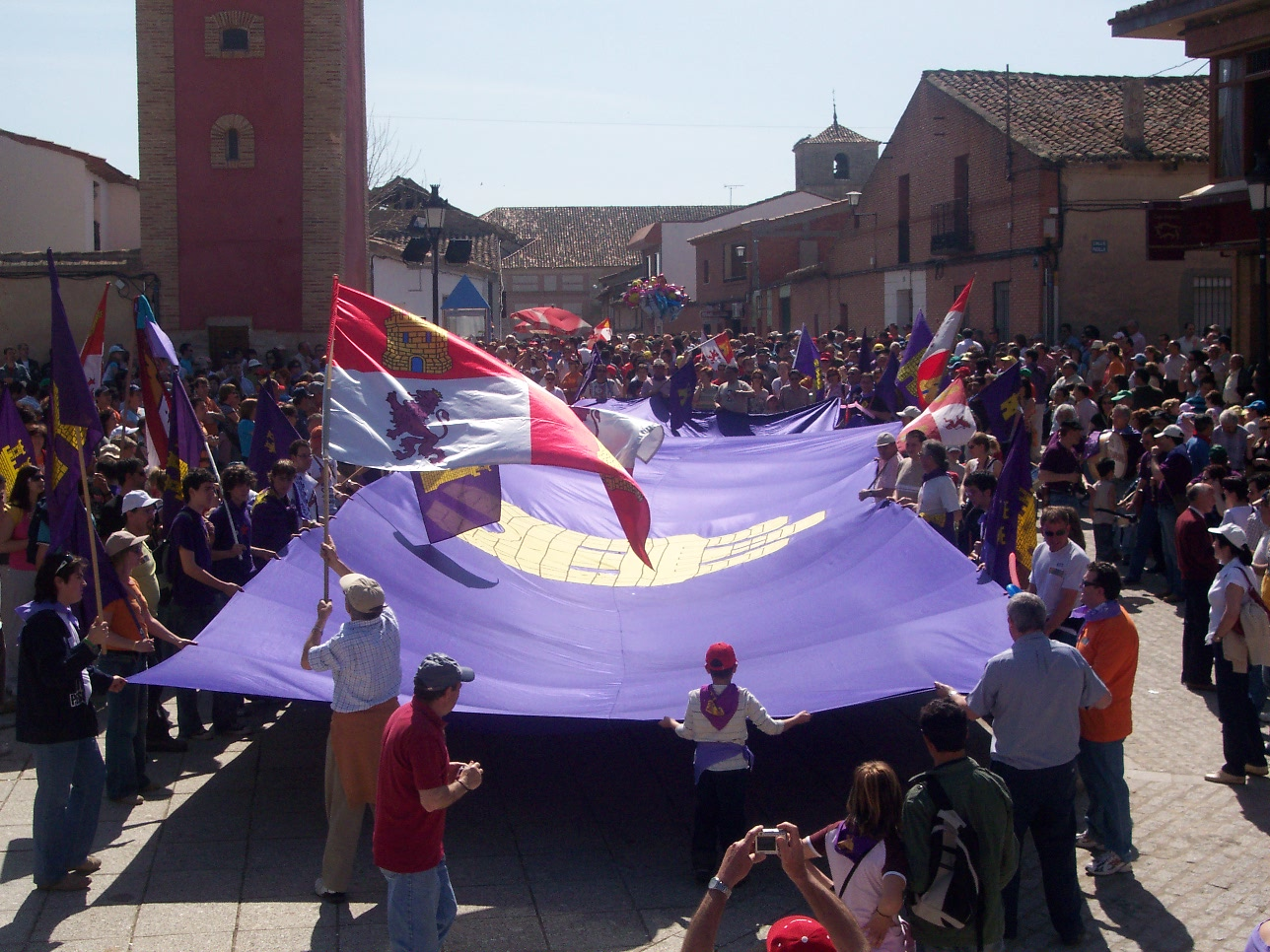
A giant flag of Castile with purple background, the colour attributed to the Comuneros, in the main square of Villalar, 2007

Attendance at Villalar on 23 April year by year, 1976-2013
| Year | Minimum | Maximum |
| 1976 | 400 | 600 |
| 1977 | 15,000 | 25,000 |
| 1978 | 200,000 | 250,000 |
| 1979 | 80,000 | 100,000 |
| 1980 | 30,000 | 50,000 |
| 1981 | 9,000 | 15,000 |
| 1982 | 30,000 | 30,000 |
| 1983 | 10,000 | 10,000 |
| 1984 | 10,000 | 30,000 |
| 1985 | 15,000 | 25,000 |
| 1986 | 4,000 | 10,000 |
| 1987 | 10,000 | 15,000 |
| 1988 | 6,000 | 10,000 |
| 1989 | 2,000 | 3,500 |
| 1990 | 3,000 | 5,000 |
| 1991 | 7,000 | 7,000 |
| 1992 | 5,000 | 10,500 |
| 1993 | 9,000 | 10,000 |
| 1994 | 5,000 | 8,000 |
| 1995 | 3,500 | 3,500 |
| 1996 | 10,000 | 10,000 |
| 1997 | 15,000 | 20,000 |
| 1998 | 20,000 | 20,500 |
| 1999 | 30,000 | 30,500 |
| 2000 | 5,500 | 6,500 |
| 2001 | 18,000 | 20,000 |
| 2002 | 38,000 | 40,500 |
| 2003 | 25,000 | 40,000 |
| 2004 | 25,000 | 35,000 |
| 2005 | 19,000 | 40,000 |
| 2006 | 22,000 | 22,200 |
| 2007 | 25,000 | 25,000 |
| 2008 | 20,000 | 22,000 |
| 2009 | 26,000 | 26,000 |
| 2010 | 20,500 | 25,000 |
| 2011 | 16,000 | 16,000 |
| 2012 | 15,000 | 15,000 |
| 2013 | 20,000 | 20,000 |
Unless otherwise noted, compiled from Source: Pérez y Pérez (2005), p. 317
