= 1531 in Portugal =

- Centuries: 15th; 16th; 17th; 18th
- Decades: 1510s; 1520s; 1530s; 1540s; 1550s
- See also: List of years in Portugal

Events in the year 1531 in Portugal.

== Incumbents ==
- King of Portugal and the Algarves: John III

== Events ==
Location of the 1531 Lisbon earthquake
- 26 January – The Lisbon earthquake and subsequent tsunami resulted in approximately 30,000 deaths.

== Births ==
- 11 November – Manuel, Prince of Portugal (died 1537)

=== Full date missing ===
- António, Prior of Crato, King of Portugal as António I of Portugal for 33 days in 1580 (died 1595)

== Deaths ==
=== Full date missing ===
- Diogo de Arruda, architect (born before 1490)
- María Pacheco, Spanish woman who escaped to Portugal when her husband Juan López de Padilla was killed in 1521 (born about 1496)

== See also ==
- History of Portugal (1415–1578)
