= Juan Bravo =

Castilian nobleman (c.1483–1521)

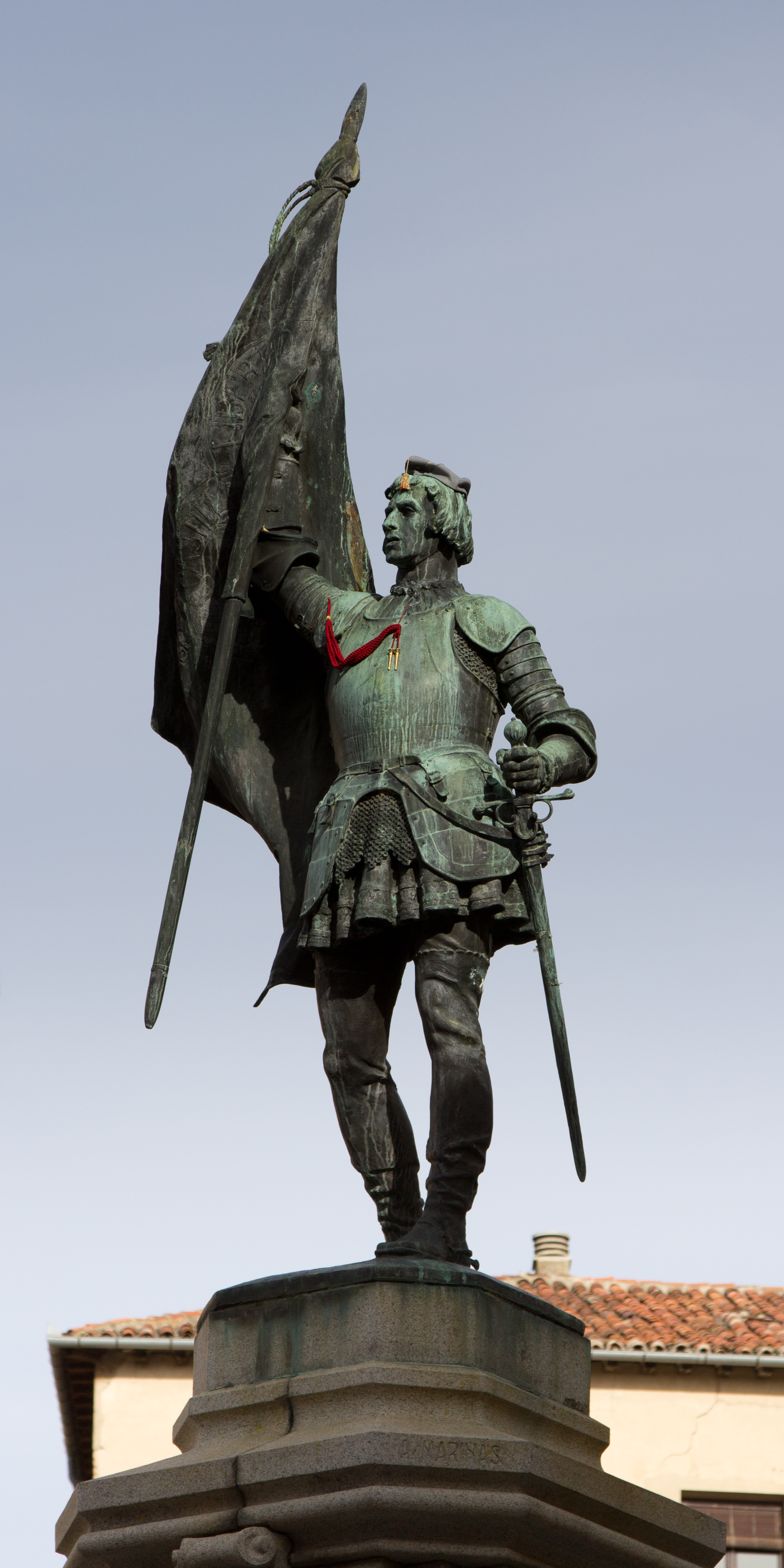
Monument to Juan Bravo in Segovia.

Juan Bravo de Lagunas y Mendoza (c. 1483, Atienza–24 April 1521, Villalar de los Comuneros) was a Castilian Nobleman and one of the leaders of the rebel Comuneros, the local councils that rebelled against Emperor Charles V in the Castilian "Revolt of the Comuneros". He lived and worked in north-central Spain.

== Biography ==
Juan Bravo was born around 1483, in the city of Atienza in Spain. His father was Gonzalo Ortega Bravo de Laguna, the director of the fort, and his mother was María de Mendoza, daughter of the Count of Montagudo. Juan Bravo was the nephew of Juan de Ortega Bravo de Laguna, the bishop of the parishes of Ciudad Rodrigo, Calahorra and Coria and was the second cousin of Luisa de Medrano and the first cousin of her mother Magdalena Bravo de Lagunas y Cienfuegos. In 1504, Juan Bravo was already living in the city of Segovia in central Spain, and a year later he married Catalina del Rio, the only daughter of Diego del Rio, a member of the Council of Segovia, and Isabel de Herrera. They had three children: Gonzalo Bravo del Río, Luis Bravo and María de Mendoza.

After becoming a widower in 1515, Bravo married María Coronel in his hometown of Segovia in 1519.[1] Maria was the daughter of Inigo López Coronel, a member of the Segovia Council and a rich merchant and the great-granddaughter of the converted Jew Abraham Senor Coronel. They had two sons from this marriage, Andrea Bravo de Mendoza and Juan Bravo de Mendoza. Inigo López Coronel bequeathed all his property to his son-in-law Juan Bravo, on the condition that Maria and Juan's children inherit them.

== Political and Military Career ==
Juan Bravo began his political career in June 1516, in La Rioja. He was one of the commanders appointed by Cardinal Cisneros, then regent of the kingdom, to establish an armed body that would exclusively serve the crown. The opposition of the high nobility caused the project to be cancelled, and it is said that the failure of the project pushed Bravo to oppose the new king.

In October 1519 Bravo was appointed head of the militias of Segovia. After he learned about the tax to Emperor Charles V and his departure to Germany on May 29, 1520, Bravo led the rebel forces, and they took control of the city of Medina del Campo and other cities during 1520 and 1521. Juan Bravo continued to lead the Segovia militia throughout the Castilian War of the Communities of Castile and managed the defence against the kingdom's soldiers. However, the Royalist forces held the Alcázar of Segovia and remained there until the end of the rebellion.

Bravo was responsible for the contact with the other rebel cities and with the rebels in them. He went to Tordesias to consult with Juana I, the queen and mother of the emperor, (whom the rebels supported) to try to gain her support, but failed.

Juan Bravo was defeated by royalist forces at the Battle of Villalar on April 23 of that year. He was captured, and the day after the battle, on April 24, 1521, he was beheaded for treason along with two other rebel leaders, in Villalar. He was buried there but with the approval of the authorities, his body was removed from his grave and returned to Segovia at the beginning of June. Civil riots broke out in Segovia. The families of Catalina del Rio, of Maria Coronel as well as his political supporters tried to turn the funeral into a solemn tribute to someone who is considered the protector of the community. The royal authorities found it difficult to contain the angry reaction of the crowd, and finally suppressed it with a heavy hand.

== Legacy ==
- Commemorated, along with the other three leaders of the rebellion, in an anonymous poem called Ode to the Bishop of Samora (1822)
- Juan Bravo El Commonero: A Drama in Four Acts (Madrid: TFM Ruano, 1849)
- Appears in The Execution of the Communards of Castile, oil painting by Antonio Guisbert Pérez (1860)
- Appears in the Battle of Villar by Manuel Piccolo Lopes (1887)
- The Juan Bravo Theater in Segovia, founded in 1917 and named after him
- It is also mentioned in the poem by the Argentine poet Raul González Toñón The Living History Beneath the Immortal Loma (1934)
- A monument was erected in his memory in the old city of Segovia (1921)

- This monument is commemorated in a painting by Lionel Lindsay, from the first half of the twentieth century.
