= Domenico Spadafora =

Italian Roman Catholic priest

Blessed Domenico Spadafora O.P.
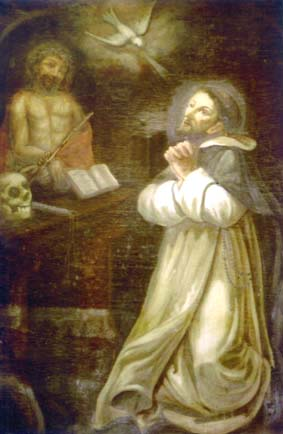
- Painting.

Priest
- Born: 1450; Randazzo, Kingdom of Sicily
- Died: 21 December 1521 (aged 71); Monte Cerignone, Kingdom of Sicily
- Venerated in: Roman Catholic Church
- Beatified: 14 January 1921, Saint Peter's Basilica, Kingdom of Italy by Pope Benedict XV
- Feast: 10 September (Monte Cerignone); 21 December
- Attributes: Dominican habit
- Patronage: Monte Cerignone

Domenico Spadafora (1450 – 21 December 1521) was an Italian Roman Catholic priest and a professed member of the Order of Preachers. Spadafora was a noted evangelist and attracted countless to the Dominican fold while also converting the hearts of others who led dissolute lives. He is best known for being the first superior of a church he oversaw construction of in Monte Cerignone after receiving the papal approval of Pope Alexander VI to commence such work.

Spadaforo received beatification from Pope Benedict XV in 1921 after the pontiff confirmed the late priest's 'cultus' (or popular and widespread devotion) as being enduring.

== Life ==
Domenico Spadafora was born in 1450 in Randazzo to nobles that came from Constantinople. He was born as the third of five children to the Baron of Maletto Giovanni Spadafora and his lower-class wife Marina. His elder brother was Giovanni while he had two sisters - one being Bartolomea - and another brother named Pietro.

He studied in Perugia after moving there in 1477 and was later sent to Padua where he earned his bachelor's degree on 23 June 1479. In Venice on 7 June 1487 he was granted his master's degree in theological studies after a public dissertation alongside eleven other candidates. He joined the Order of Preachers at the convent of Santa Zita in Palermo after returning following the dissertation when his superiors recalled him.

Spadaforo was ordained to the priesthood in 1479. He participated at the General Chapter of the order in Venice in 1487. He was supposed to be assigned to a convent in Messina in 1487 but the Father General of the order Gioacchino Torriani decided to have him as his collaborator in Rome; in 1487 he participated in the General Chapter in Le Mans in the Kingdom of France. Spadaforo became a noted preacher and evangelist and won the hearts of converts that had led dissolute lives - such an example of holiness also prompted countless others to join the Dominican fold as religious themselves. He was known for his intense devotion to the passion of Jesus Christ. He taught theological studies in the Sicilian area.

He founded the convent of Madonna delle Grazie - that housed a miraculous image of the Madonna - in 1491 in Monte Cerignone and served for the remainder of his life as its first superior. This came about when the faithful of the area wanted to enhance the small chapel and thus the Master General of the Dominicans sent for Spadaforo to oversee its renovation. The priest arrived there in the town on 15 September 1491 and set off on foot to Rome in 1492 to receive papal approval for this work. At this point Pope Innocent VII died and Pope Alexander VI was elected in a chain of events that postponed their meeting until 22 February 1493 when papal permission was granted; he returned with the decree of approval in 1493. Construction of the church commenced in 1494 and the work concluded in 1491. The Bishop Marco Vigerio della Rovere consecrated the new church on 16 July 1498.

Domenico Spadaforo died in his cell on 21 December 1521 after his health deteriorated during the previous few months. He died after the celebration of Mass and asking the forgiveness of his brother Dominicans for his mistakes; the ailing priest also received the last sacraments and died at sunset as his fellow brothers sang the "Salve Regina".

=== Exhumation ===
The priest's remains were exhumed in 1545 and were deemed to be incorrupt and moved once again in 1653 after the convent he was interred in was suppressed - the remains were instead taken to the Santa Maria in Recluso church. His remains were relocated on 3 October 1677. The remains were relocated once more on 4 April 2005 to the Chiesa della Santissima Trinità.

== Beatification ==
The beatification process was initiated in April 1920 and on 12 January 1921 the members of the Congregation of Rites voted in favor of approving the local 'cultus' (or popular devotion) of the late priest without the need for following the normal canonical process.

His beatification was confirmed on 14 January 1921 after Pope Benedict XV granted formal approval to the recognition of the 'cultus'.

The process for subsequent sanctification was revitalized decades later when the diocesan process of canonization opened on 10 September 2006 in the Diocese of San Marino-Montefeltro when the Bishop Luigi Negri inaugurated the process. The diocesan process concluded on 14 September 2008 and the Congregation for the Causes of Saints validated the process on 17 July 2009.

The current postulator assigned to the cause - since 2006 - is Father Cristoforo M. Bialowas.
