= Nydala Abbey =

Former Cisterian monastery in Småland, Sweden

Coordinates: 57°19′22.76″N 14°20′28.57″E

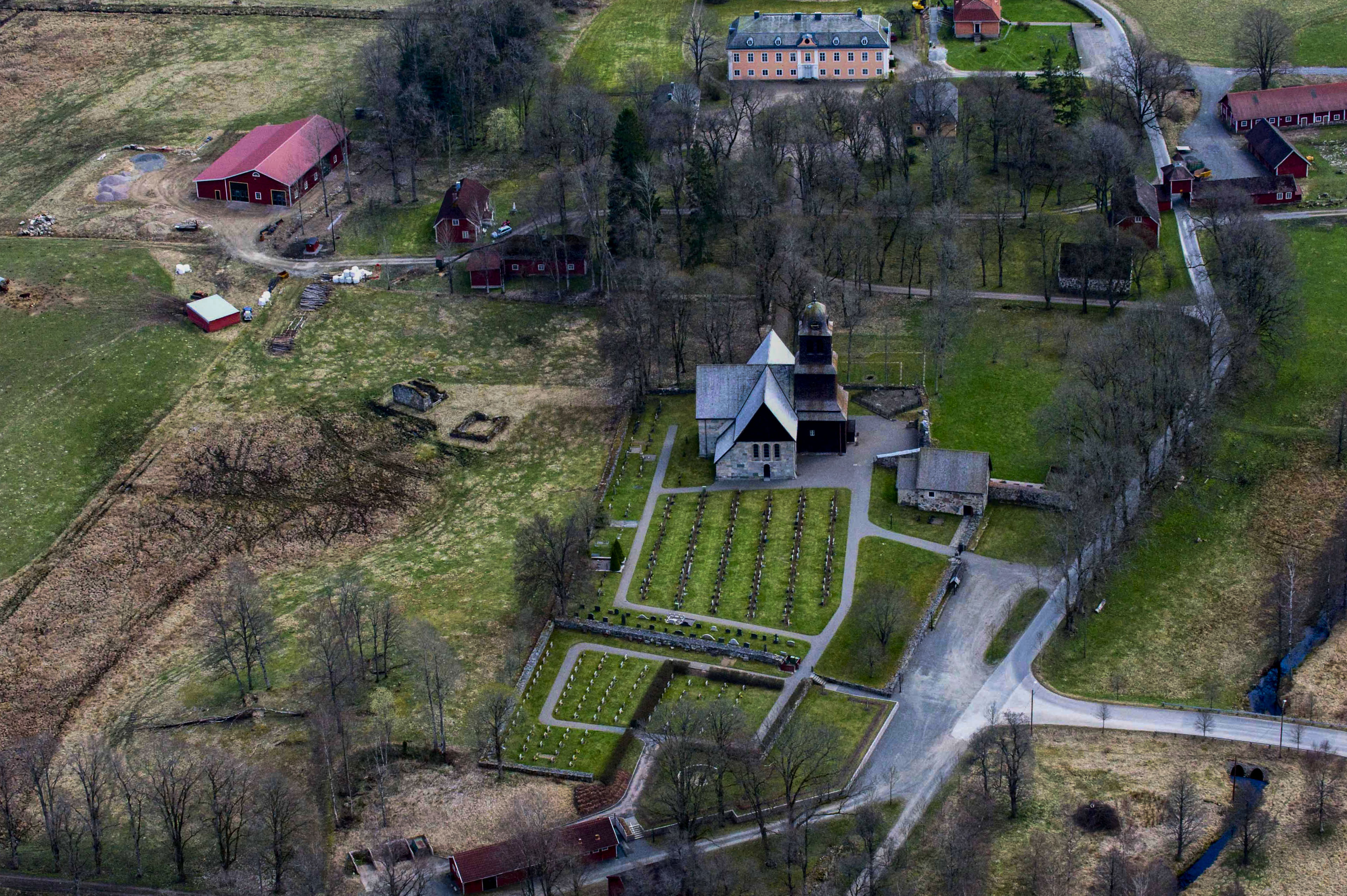
Aerial view of the abbey. In the centre of the picture is the church and the renovated gatehouse chapel. To the left some ruins of the medieval abbey can be seen, while at the top of the picture Nydala Manor is discernible.

Nydala Abbey (Swedish: Nydala kloster) was a Cistercian monastery in the province of Småland, Sweden, near the lake Rusken. Although the abbey ceased to operate in the 16th century, its church was renovated and converted into a Protestant church during the 17th century and is still in use. The church belongs to the Church of Sweden and is part of the Diocese of Växjö.

== History ==
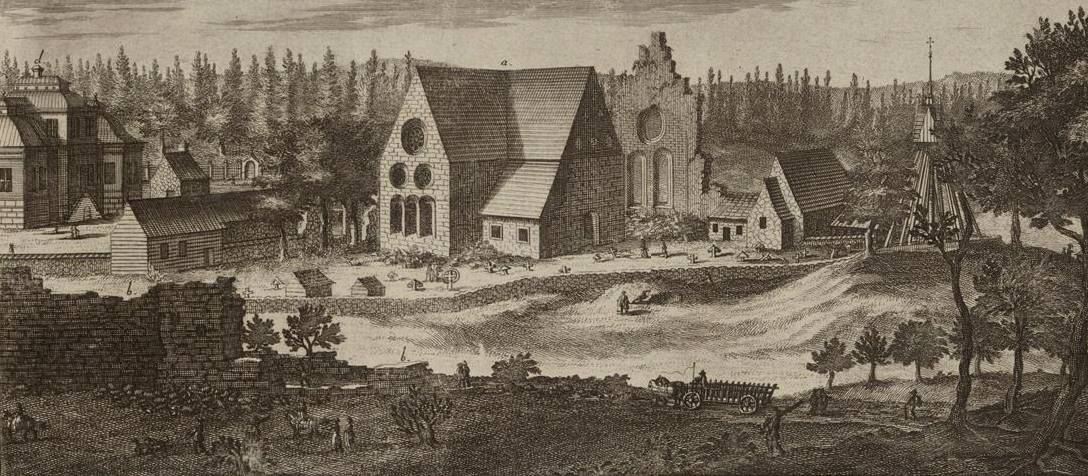
Engraving showing the site of Nydala Abbey in the late 17th century. From Suecia Antiqua et Hodierna by Erik Dahlbergh.

Nydala (from Swedish ny, meaning new, and dal, meaning valley) was called Sancta Maria de Nova Valle or just Nova Vallis in Latin. It was founded in 1143 by Cistercian monks sent out from Clairvaux Abbey in France. Together with Alvastra and Roma Abbey, it is one of the oldest Cistercian abbeys in Sweden. It is furthermore unique in Sweden in that the Cistercian ideal of almost complete isolation was respected: the abbey was built in an area away from any settlement. The abbey took slightly over a hundred years to complete, and the church was not inaugurated until 1266. Rather little is known about the abbey's active period during the Middle Ages. It has been described as "once rich and powerful". As late as 1503, a letter of protection for the abbey was issued by the Pope Julius II.

In 1521, the King Christian II lodged in the abbey during his return journey from Stockholm and the Stockholm Bloodbath. Although treated well by the monks, on leaving the abbey he had the abbot and five of the monks drowned in the Nydala Abbey Bloodbath, and plundered the church. The event could possibly be explained by the fact that the abbey may have been run and populated by members of the Swedish nobility that formed part of the resistance against Christian II. Soon after, in 1527 during the Swedish Reformation, King Gustavus Vasa appropriated the abbey and confiscated its remaining valuables in accordance with the Reduction of Gustav I of Sweden. The Swedish Crown confiscated its lands, and from some of these were formed a Crown Estate manor which would later become Nydala Manor, located nearby. The local peasants resisted these changes and murdered the first administrator that the Crown sent to take over the abbey. The abbey suffered again during the Northern Seven Years' War, when it was burnt and pillaged by Danish troops in 1568.

During the 1680s, parts of the medieval church were renovated and began to be used as a Lutheran parish church. The church was re-inaugurated in 1688.

In 1952 the former gatehouse chapel of the abbey, the so-called "farmers' church", was renovated. The main church was renovated in 1964–67.

== Architecture ==
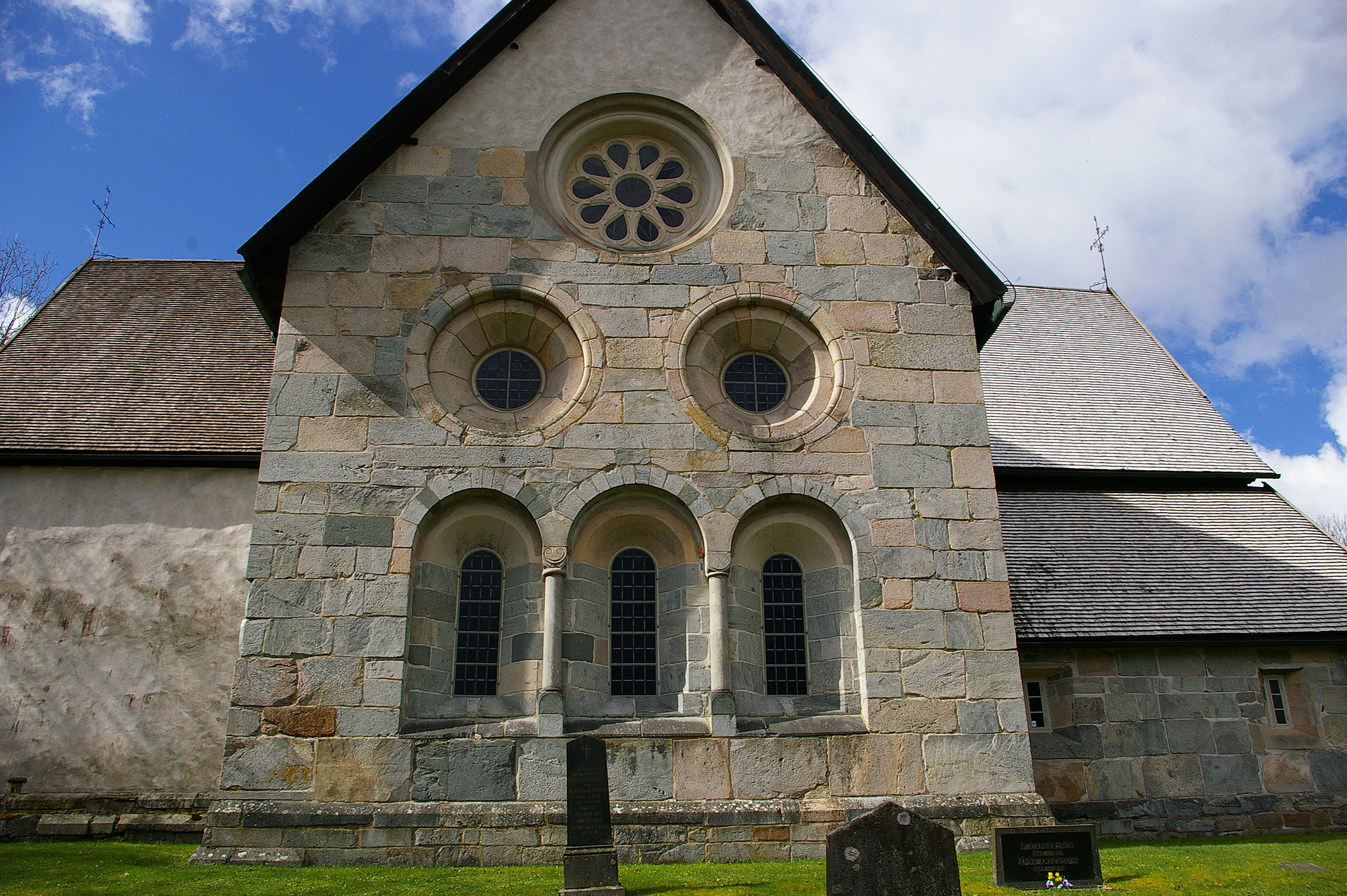
Nydala Abbey, view of the eastern façade of the church

The presently visible church consist of the easternmost parts of the medieval abbey church. The western part was torn down during the renovation during the 17th century. Apart from the original choir and transept, a northern and southern chapel also remain of the original church. One of these have been converted into a sacristy. Two further such chapels have disappeared during the course of time.

The church was built according to the ideas and ideals of Cistercian architecture as developed in France. It was from the outset characterised by simplicity and austerity in form and decoration. The building material is grey gneiss. Especially the eastern end of the church retains several fine details and displays much of its original medieval character. Internally, many of the church fittings date from the Baroque era, including the altarpiece and the pulpit. The pews and the organ platform are decorated by Pehr Hörberg.

The church originally formed one side of a quadrangle or courtyard surrounded on the other sides by buildings of which nothing but a few ruins remains today, and the abbey was surrounded by a wall. The aforementioned gatehouse chapel still survives. Another building nearby which may be medieval may have contained the abbey stables. The wooden bell tower was built during the early 18th century. In 2004, a project was initiated to reconstruct a medieval abbey garden next to the church.

== Nydala Manor ==
Nydala Manor is located just north of the former abbey complex. The first manor was built around 1650, but in its present shape the building dates from 1790, built in a so-called Gustavian style. The manor is one of the finest representatives of the style in Jönköping County.
