= Battle of Villalar =

1521 battle during the Revolt of the Comuneros

Coordinates: 41.5500°N 5.1333°W

- Part of the Revolt of the Comuneros
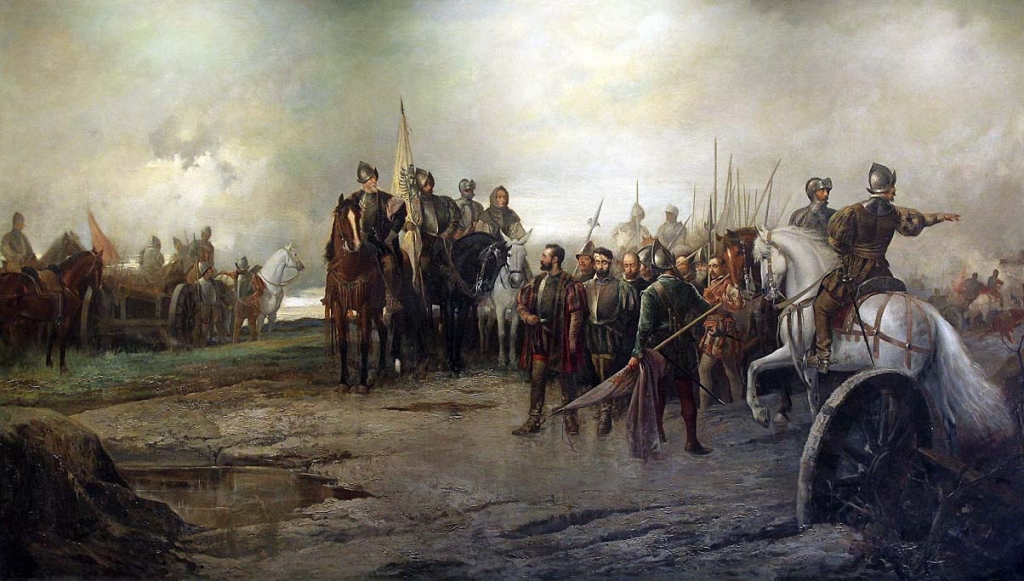
- A 19th century work by Manuel Picolo López depicting the Battle of Villalar.
Date	23 April 1521
Location	Villalar, Crown of Castile
Result	Royalist victory

Belligerents
Royalist Castilians	Comuneros

Commanders and leaders
Íñigo Fernández	Juan López de Padilla (POW) (executed); Francisco Maldonado (POW) (executed); Juan Bravo (POW) (executed)

Strength
8,400 men: 6,000 infantry; 2,400 cavalry	7,400 men: 7,000 infantry; 400 cavalry

Casualties and losses
20–30 dead	500–1,000 dead

The Battle of Villalar was a battle in the Revolt of the Comuneros fought on 23 April 1521 near the town of Villalar in Valladolid province, Spain. The royalist supporters of King Charles I won a crushing victory over the comuneros rebels. Three of the most important rebel leaders were captured, Juan de Padilla, Juan Bravo, and Francisco Maldonado. They were executed the next day, effectively ending armed resistance to Charles I.

== Background ==
In late March 1521, the royalist side moved to combine their armies and threaten Torrelobatón, a rebel stronghold. The Constable of Castile began to move his troops (including soldiers recently transferred from the defense of Navarre) southwest from Burgos to meet with the Admiral's forces near Tordesillas. This was possible due to the comunero-aligned Count of Salvatierra's force being caught up in the siege of Medina de Pomar; the Count's forces had previously been enough of a threat to force the Constable to maintain a large army to defend Burgos. The Constable's army had approximately 3,000 infantry, 600 cavalry, 2 cannons, 2 culverin, and 5 light artillery pieces. His army took up positions in Becerril de Campos, near Palencia. Meanwhile, the comuneros reinforced their troops at Torrelobatón, which was far less secure than the comuneros preferred. Their forces were suffering from desertions, and the presence of royalist artillery would make Torrelobatón's castle vulnerable. They had two strategic possibilities: prevent the Constable and Admiral from uniting their forces by striking at the Constable while he was still on the field, or carry out low-level harrying operations to try to slow the Constable down. The comuneros did neither, and thus allowed the Constable to approach nearly unchecked. The commander of the comunero armies, Juan de Padilla, considered withdrawing to Toro to seek reinforcements in early April, but wavered. He delayed his decision until the early hours of 23 April, losing considerable time and allowing the royalists to unite their forces in Peñaflor.

== Battle ==
The Royalist army pursued the Comuneros. As had been the case through most of the war, the Royalists had a strong advantage in cavalry, with their army consisting of 6,000 infantry and 2,400 cavalry against Padilla's 7,000 infantry and 400 cavalry. Heavy rain slowed Padilla's infantry more than the royalist cavalry and rendered the primitive firearms of the rebels' 1,000 arquebusiers nearly useless. Padilla hoped to reach the relative safety of Toro and the heights of Vega de Valdetronco, but his infantry was too slow. He gave battle with the harrying royalist cavalry at the town of Villalar.

The Comuneros set up their artillery to try to blunt the cavalry charge, but this failed. According to some reports, the artillery did more damage to the comuneros than the royalist cavalry. Sources differ on the reasons behind this. According to the account of Pedro de Alcocer (a friend of the Padillas), the Comuneros were betrayed; the artillery and some 300 soldiers had been bought off by the royalists prior to the battle, and switched sides. The artillery intentionally fired high and destroyed their powder. A slightly more subdued theory blames the rain for the ineffectiveness of the Comunero artillery. Finally, it is possible that in the heat of the battle, the artillerymen simply panicked and made mistakes.

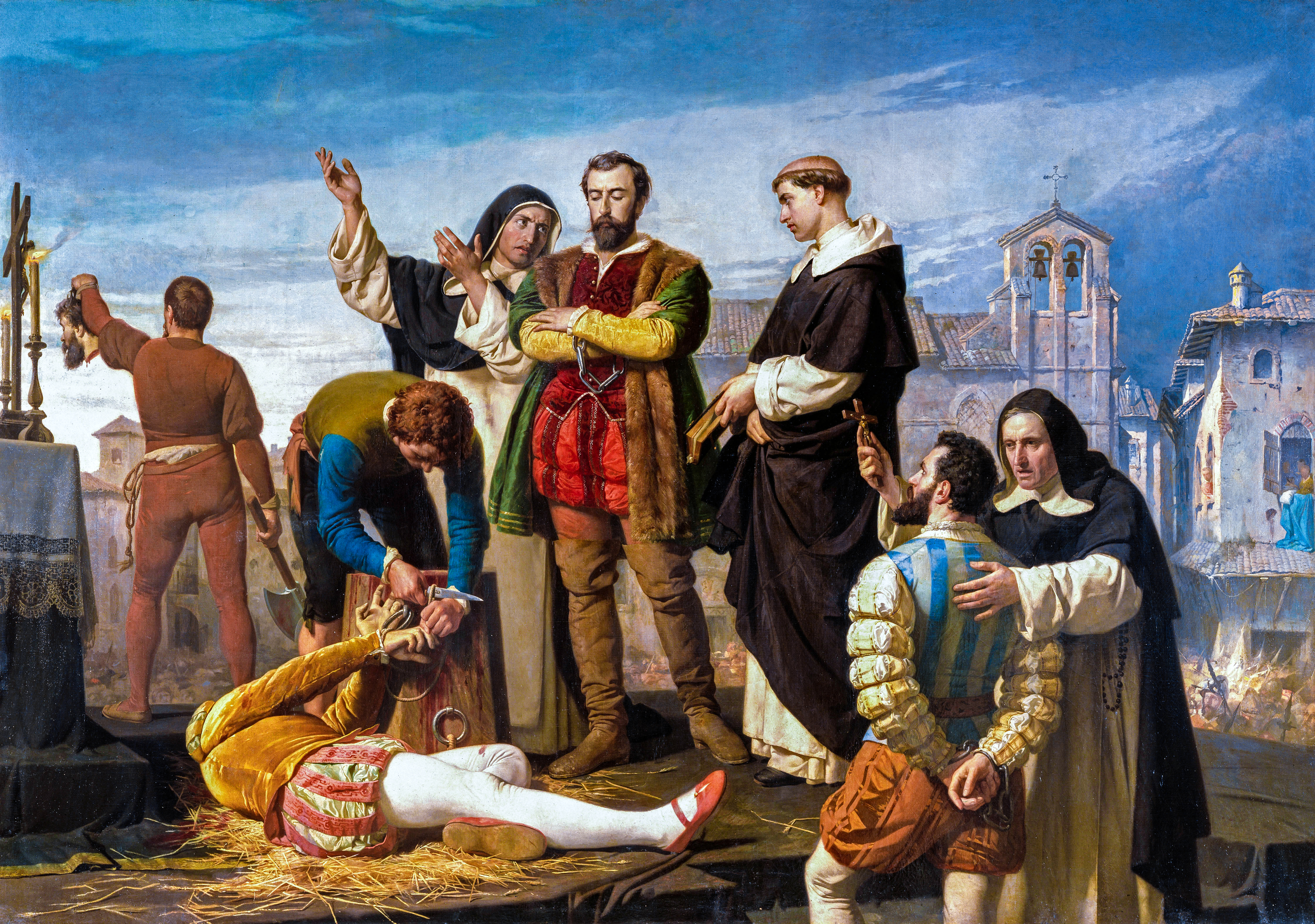
Execution of the Comuneros of Castile, by Antonio Gisbert.

The cavalry charges scattered the rebel ranks thus ending the battle and becoming a slaughter. There were an estimated 500–1,000 rebel casualties and many desertions. The three most important leaders of the rebellion were captured: Juan de Padilla, Juan Bravo, and Francisco Maldonado. They were beheaded the next morning in the Plaza of Villalar, in front of a large portion of the Royalist noblemen. The remains of the rebel army at Villalar fragmented, with some attempting to join Acuña's army near Toledo and others fleeing to Portugal. The rebellion was struck a crippling blow.

== Aftermath ==
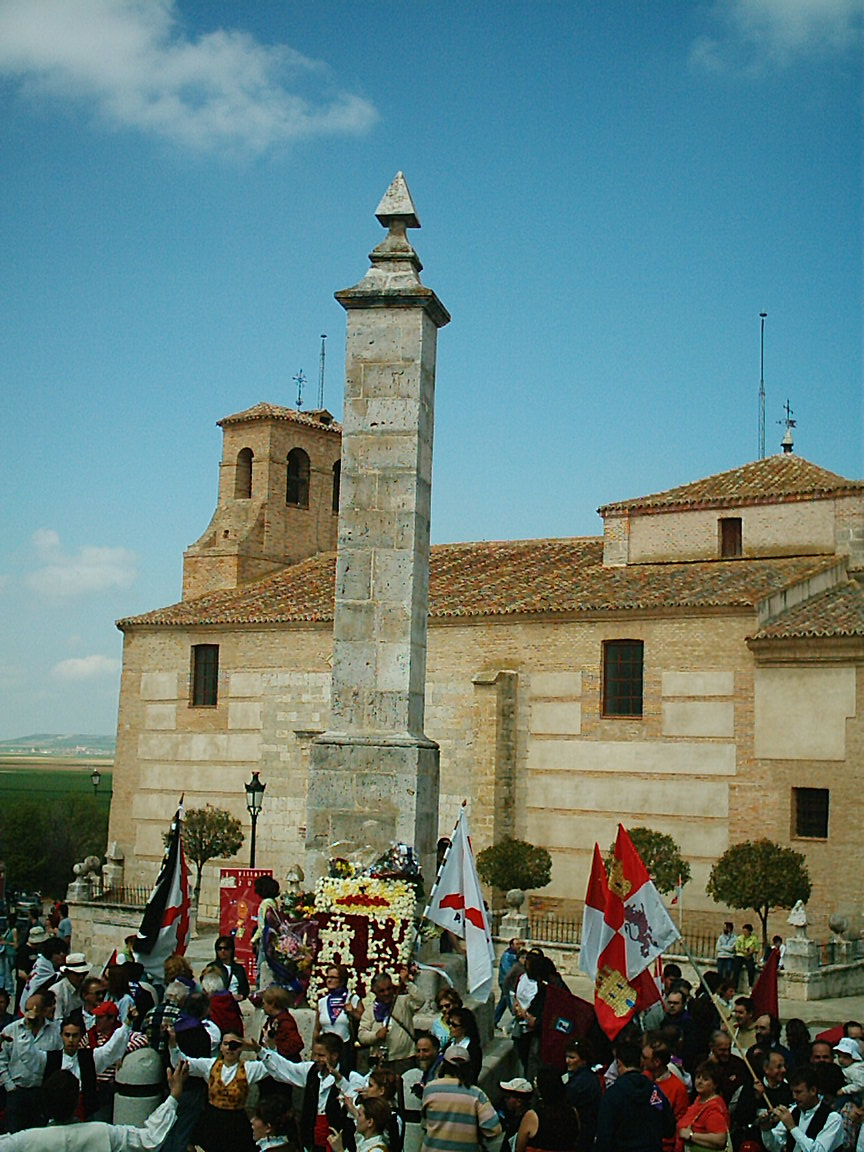
A floral offering at Villalar, on Castile and León Day, 23 April 2006.

Demoralized, and without leaders or an army, the rebel cities of Old Castile soon surrendered to the Constable's armies. It took slightly longer for the Constable's armies to march south to New Castile and retake Madrid. They likely would have taken Toledo as well, but a French invasion of Spanish-controlled Navarre meant that the army needed to immediately be recalled north to fight the French and Navarrese. As a result, the Revolt stretched out several months more, with Toledo resisting until October.

== Legacy ==
The Battle of Villalar would later be claimed by Spanish liberals as the blow that extinguished Castilian liberties in favor of autocratic Spanish monarchy. This view started in the 1820s, as Juan Martín Díez "El Empecinado", a nationalistic liberal military leader during the Peninsular War, led an expedition to find and exhume the remains of the three Castilian leaders executed in 1521. Later, some city councils called for celebrations at Villalar in the 1920s. After the end of Franco's dictatorship, this view became more generalized. The autonomous community of Castile and León made 23 April the official holiday of Castile and León Day in 1986, although it had been popularly celebrated since 1976. It is celebrated yearly at Villalar, which has since the Second Spanish Republic renamed itself Villalar de los Comuneros, honouring the Castilian rebels.
