= María Pacheco =

Castilian revolutionary leader (1496–1531)

Doña María Pacheco La Valerosa
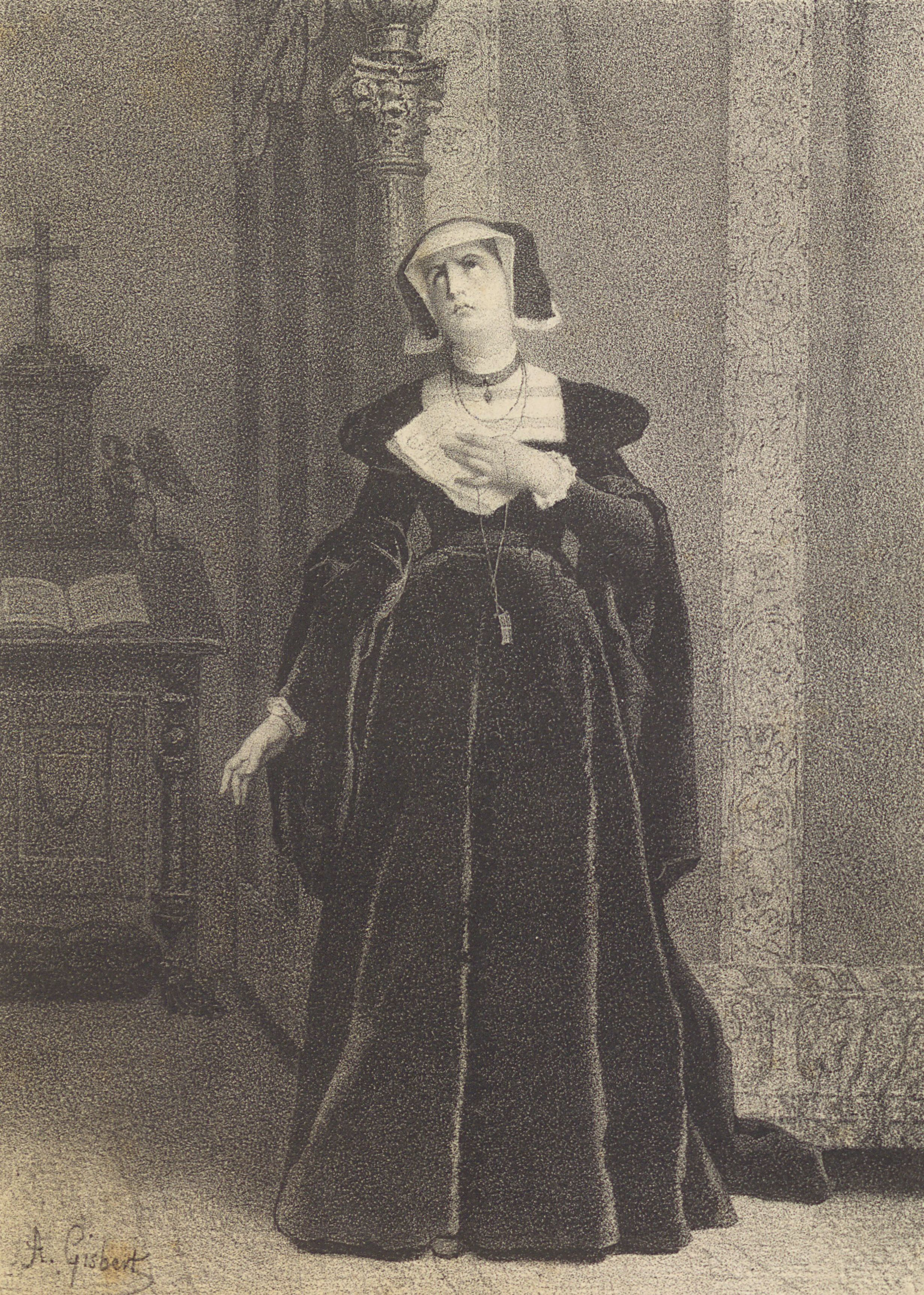
- 1868 lithograph of Pacheco

Leader of the Comunidad de Toledo
- In office April 1521 – February 1522

Personal details
- Born: María López de Mendoza y Pacheco c. 1496 Granada, Kingdom of Granada
- Died: March 1531 (aged 34–35) Porto, Kingdom of Portugal
- Resting place: Porto Cathedral
- Spouse: Juan López de Padilla (m. 1515; died 1521)
- Children: Pedro López de Padilla (c. 1516–1523)
- Parents: Íñigo López de Mendoza (father); Francisca Pacheco (mother)
- Family: House of Mendoza

María López de Mendoza y Pacheco (c. 1496–1531) was a Castilian revolutionary who led the Revolt of the Comuneros in the Kingdom of Toledo.

Born into the House of Mendoza in the Kingdom of Granada, she was given a classical education and oversaw management of the palace of Alhambra. Her father, Íñigo López de Mendoza, a proponent of religious tolerance and secular authority against the Spanish Inquisition, arranged her to be married to Juan López de Padilla, an hidalgo from the Kingdom of Toledo. There she took over management of the Padilla estate, while her husband campaigned for the rights of the petty nobility against the foreign rule of Carlos I.

Following the outbreak of the Revolt of the Comuneros in 1520, she attempted to get her brother elected as the Archbishop of Toledo, but was blocked by another faction of the comuneros. After the comunero defeat at the Battle of Villalar, her husband was executed and she subsequently took command of the revolt in Toledo. She drew popular support for the cause and oversaw the reinforcement of the city's defences, ultimately resulting in negotiations ending with the royalists granting Toledo generous concessions. When the royalists reneged on the agreed terms, Toledo revolted again. As royalists called for Pacheco's head, she fled the city in disguise. She went into exile in Portugal, where she died.

She was denounced for insanity and witchcraft by contemporary Castilian chroniclers, while the Castilian state demolished her headquarters and salted the earth, leaving behind a monument to the defeat of the comuneros. In the modern period, her legacy has been reinterpreted, depicting her as an early advocate of social equality and human rights.

== Biography ==
=== Early life and family ===
María Pacheco was born c. 1496, in the palace of the Alhambra, in the Kingdom of Granada. She was the daughter of Íñigo López de Mendoza, the Count of Tendilla, and Francisca Pacheco. Her mother died in 1507, while María was still a child. She was raised by her father, an intellectual of the Spanish Renaissance, who provided his daughter with an education. Taught by Hernán Núñez and Peter Martyr d'Anghiera, she was educated in the Latin and Greek languages, as well as mathematics, history, poetry and Christian scripture. She also studied the classical politics.

By the time María entered her adolescence, the House of Mendoza was already losing its political and economic influence in Granada, in part as Mendoza was an opponent of the Spanish Inquisition. Despite their loyalty to Fernando V, which had cost them land holdings and significant military expenses, the Mendozas were largely snubbed by the monarch. Mendoza thus sought an alliance with the Padilla family, which commanded the Order of Calatrava and presided over the Council of Orders, and which had declared its loyalty to Juana of Castile.

Although López de Mendoza still considered himself loyal to Fernando, he shared the Padillas' fidelity to the House of Trastámara against the rising House of Habsburg and a desire to protect the autonomy of the Kingdom of Toledo from the Crown of Castile. Pacheco herself took up this anti-Habsburg sentiment, as she considered the legitimacy of the Spanish monarchy to be based in its attention to the welfare of the country, and particularly the Spanish nobility.

=== Marriage to Padilla ===
By 1509, Mendoza was already considering the formalisation of his alliance with the Padillas by marrying his daughter off to the family. As he had a tender love for María, and wanted to spare her the effects of her older sister's unhappy marriage, he wanted to ensure she was set up with a suitable partner. He found his desired match in Juan de Padilla. In November 1510, a dowry was finally agreed, on the condition that Pacheco renounce her inheritance to her husband. When López de Padilla finally arrived in Granada on 14 August 1511, Pacheco had not yet met her betrothed and was apparently apprehensive about the arranged marriage. The couple were officially engaged the following day, in a ceremony attended by the Padillas and Mendozas, as well as the royal treasurer.

As all this came at a great expense to him, Mendoza requested that Fernando appoint him as tax administrator for the Kingdom of Granada, which would provide him with the means he thought necessary to provide his daughter with a good wedding, but the King rejected his request. In 1514, they began making preparations for the wedding; the expenses of the event weighed heavily on Mendoza, who increasingly resented Fernando for his lack of support. He was unable to provide his daughter with a silk wedding dress or gold jewellery, and requested that his guests dress modestly. He continued to request that Fernando help finance the event, but was repeatedly rebuffed, causing him great anxiety and financial stress, as he was forced to sell his jewellery and go into debt to "everyone in the city" in order to pay for the wedding.

The wedding was finally held on 18 January 1515, in the middle of the winter. The wedding was attended by 150 people and Pacheco's fiancé was greeted by "everyone in the city who could ride a horse". Morisco officials from Albaicín also blessed the event, as a sign of respect that the citizens of Granada had for Mendoza. He was keen to report this to Fernando, in a display of the success of his religious tolerance against Fernando's policy of religious persecution. After the wedding, Pacheco and her new husband left for Porcuna, in the Kingdom of Toledo. Although saddened by his daughter leaving, Mendoza was satisfied that she would be treated well by the Padillas.

Not long after arriving in Porcuna, Padilla left to attend to business, leaving Pacheco in charge of the local commandery. Already experienced in management, having run the affairs at the Alhambra after her mother's death, Pacheco took over the Padilla family's enterprises. She also kept her father informed of his enemies' activities at King Fernando's court, and acted as an intermediary between the Mendozas and Padillas, placing her at the centre of the two families' plans and aspirations. Little documentary information of her activities exist in the years following her father's death in July 1515; during this time, she cultivated her influence in the Kingdom of Toledo, rising to a prominent position that eventually saw her in command of the city of Toledo.

=== Revolutionary leadership ===
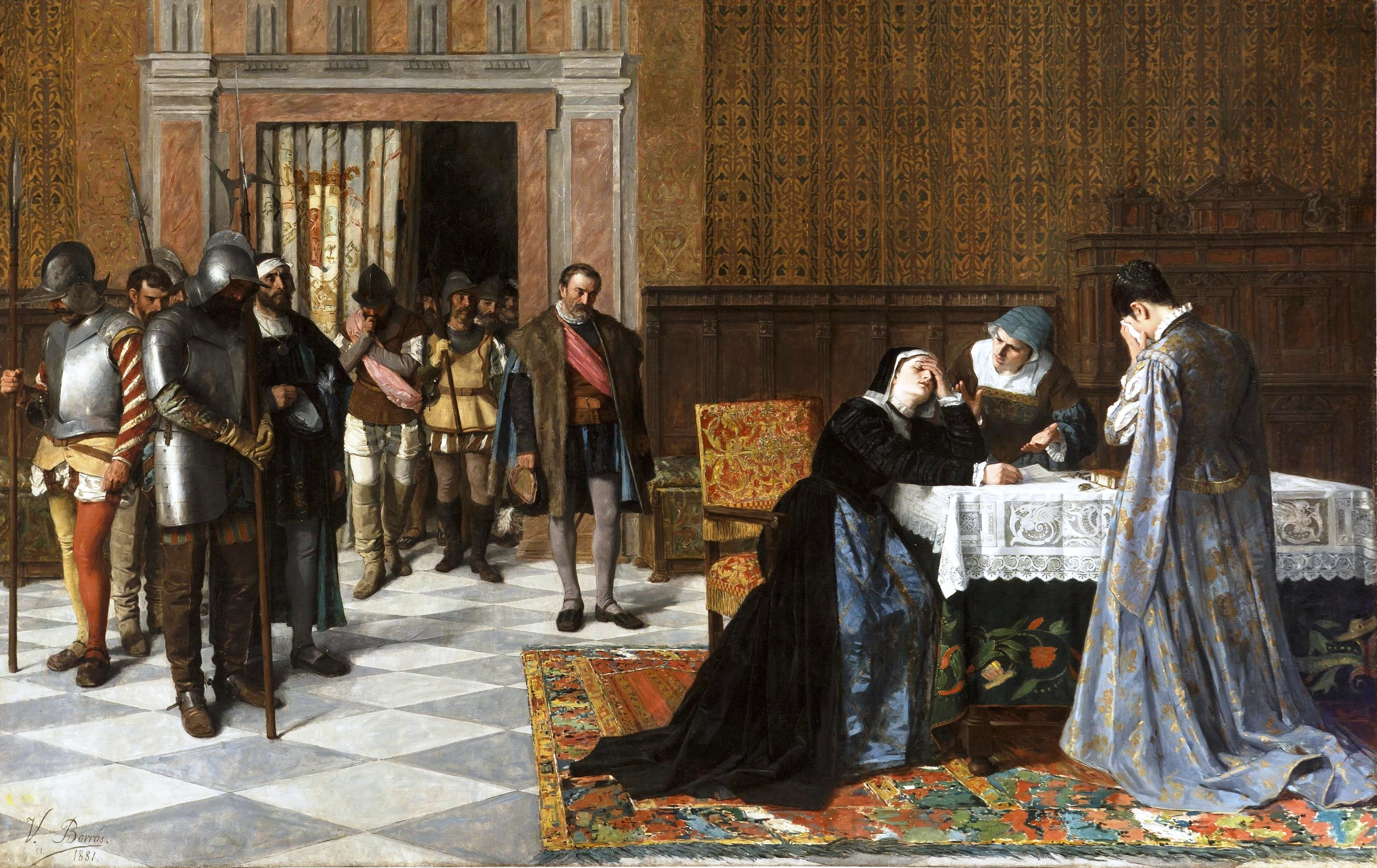
María Pacheco receiving news of her husband's execution, depicted in an 1881 painting by Vicente Borrás y Mompó

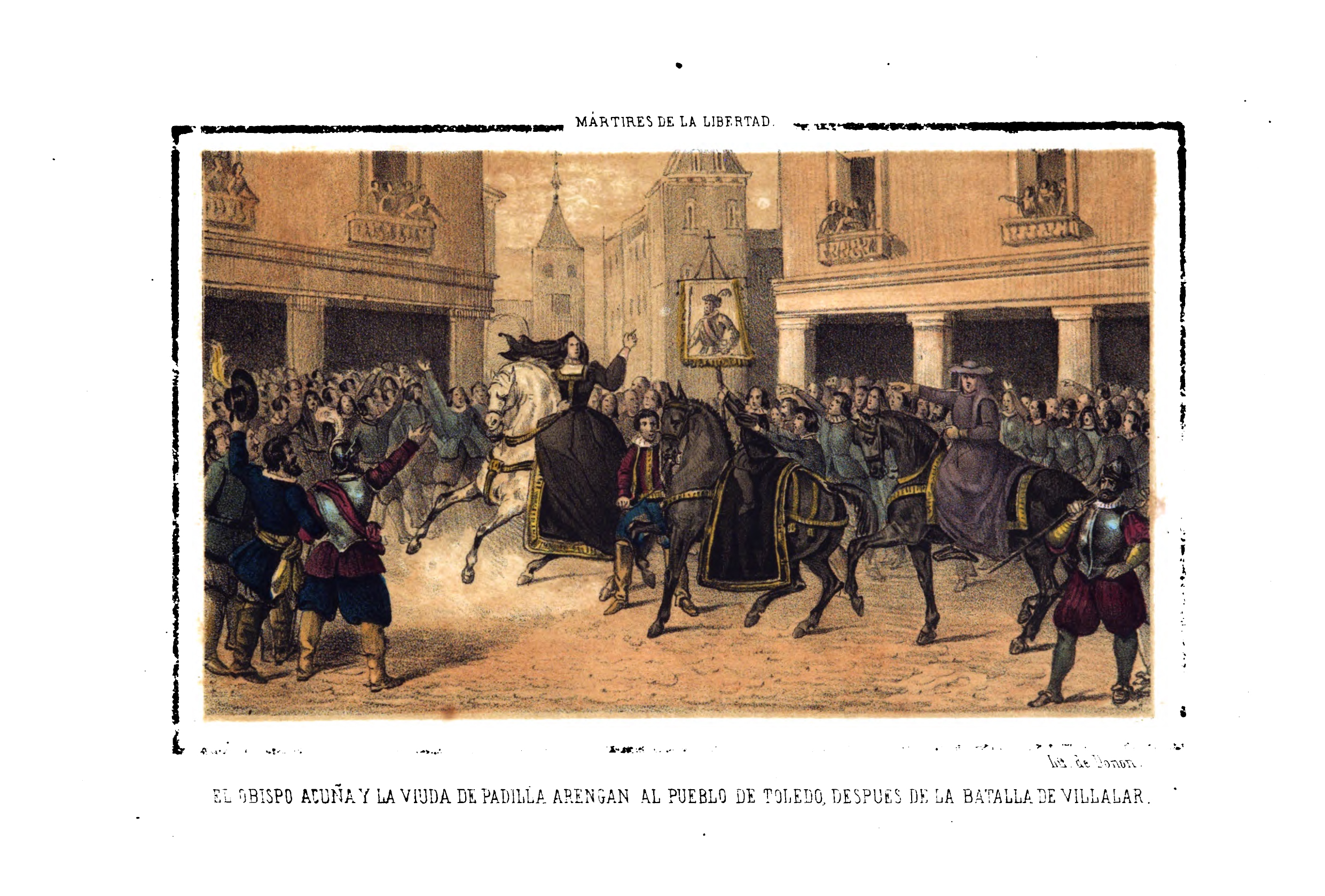
María Pacheco's demonstration in Toledo, rallying the city to her banner after her husband's execution, depicted in an 1853 lithograph by Julio Donón

Following the coronation of Carlos I as King of Castile, the Flemish Jean Sauvage was appointed as the country's chancellor. The Padillas, who advocated for Toledan autonomy and were opponents of foreign rule, resisted the new administration. Juan de Padilla defended the rites of the hidalgos (petty nobility) and the urban poor against the monarchy and the barons, gaining him substantial support in Toledo, where he led the Revolt of the Comuneros against the Crown.

In January 1521, after the death of the Flemish William de Croÿ, the Archbishop of Toledo, Pacheco seized the opportunity to promote a member of her own family to the position. Pacheco's own father had advocated for a strong secular authority over the Church and had advised his daughter on how to pursue this policy. She actively campaigned for the election of her brother Francisco de Mendoza, attempting to garner support before Carlos I was able to act against her. But a different faction of the comuneros opposed her moves and invited Antonio Osorio de Acuña, the Bishop of Zamora, to contest the election and limit Pacheco's power in Toledo. Although she feared Acuña's arrival would challenge her "uncontested authority", the Bishop offered an exchange, in which she would support his election bid in return for her husband being appointed as commander of the Order of Santiago. Despite their agreement, Acuña was ultimately unable to consolidate clerical power in the city. Meanwhile, Pacheco continued her movements to advance her family's interests in Toledo.

After the defeat of the comuneros at the Battle of Villalar in April 1521, Pacheco's husband Juan de Padilla was executed by the royalist forces. Pacheco immediately began crafting her public appearances in order to sway Toledan public opinion further in her favour: she kept herself clothed in mourning dress, brought her son with her and carried a painting of her late husband as she passed through the city's streets. Her denunciation of her husband's execution for his defence of the city won her popular support, which secured her position as the city's leader. She seized the alcázar of Toledo, from which she appointed new officials, imposed taxes and oversaw the city's defences, ordering that church bells be melted down in order to make cannons. Unable to lead the revolt and raise her son at the same time, she sent him out of the city to be cared for by his uncle; he died two years later.

Pacheco's leading role on the side of the comuneros contrasts with that of her brothers Antonio and Luis, who both fought on the side of the royalists in the Kingdom of Granada. Pacheco herself adhered to her family's legacy of resistance to foreign monarchs and maintained an intransigent commitment to the comunero cause, the latter of which saw her dubbed "La Valerosa" (English: The Courageous) by the historian Prudencio de Sandoval. Pacheco held the monarchy to be dependent on the support of the Castilian nobility and needed to maintain its patronage, or risk losing their support. She thus believed that Carlos ought to be compelled to uphold Castilian noble rites by armed resistance.

=== Defeat, exile and death ===
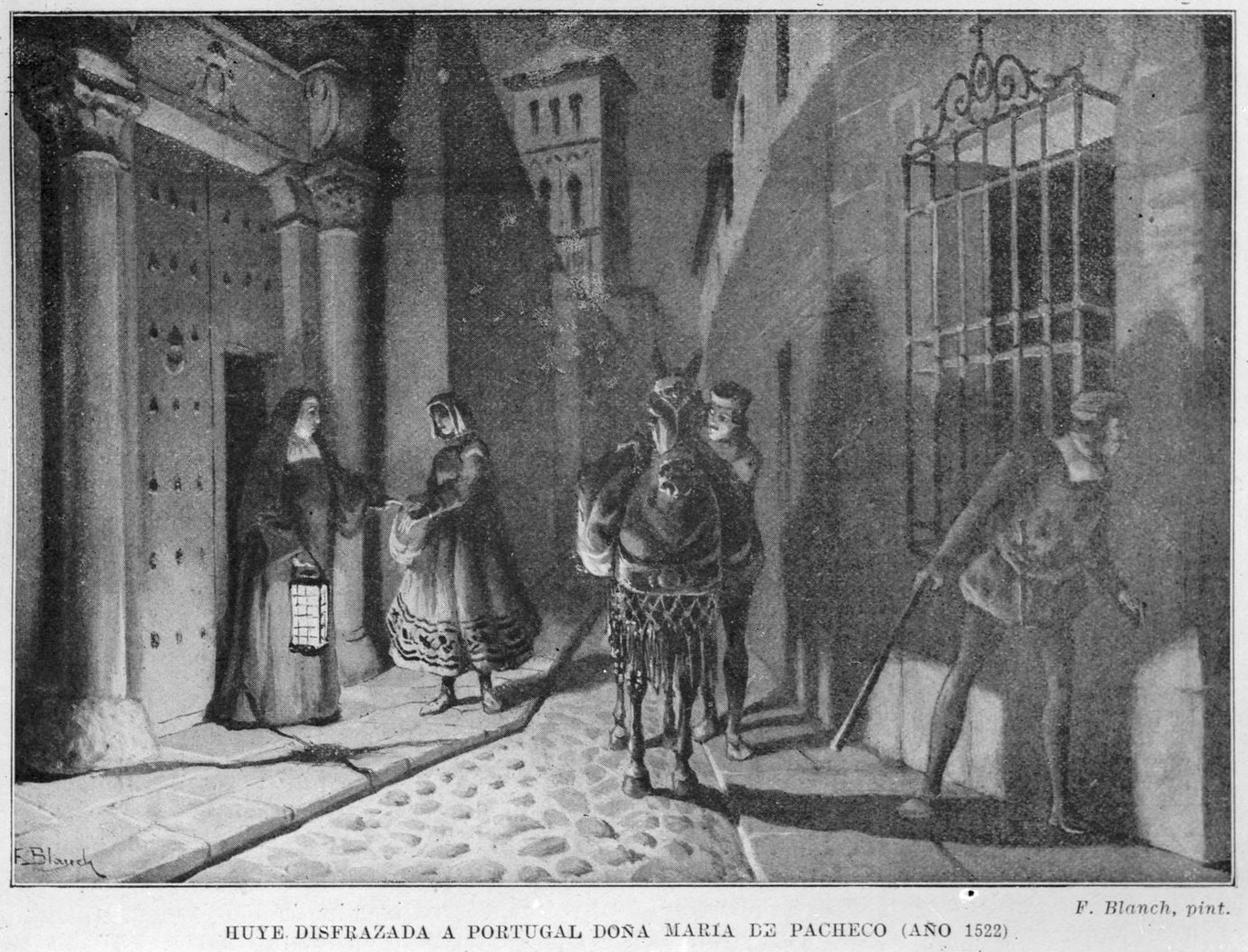
Illustration of María Pacheco, in disguise, fleeing into exile in Portugal, depicted by Francisco Blanch Sintes (1920s)

As Carlos brought more aristocrats over to the royalist side, the comuneros faced increasing demoralisation. Despite the tide of the conflict changing in favour of the royalists, Pacheco managed to rally Toledo into maintaining its resistance, even after the rest of Castile was pacified. From May 1521 to February 1522, she was the unquestioned leader of the city and was seen to have embodied the spirit of the comuneros. In October 1521, the French invasion of Navarre forced the royalists to the negotiating table. Pacheco secured advantageous terms for Toledo's surrender, including the return of the Padillas' sequestered property and a royal allowance, the latter of which was petitioned for by her brother Luis.

After the Navarre conflict ended, the comuneros feared that the royalists would go back on the terms won in October. By the beginning of 1522, royalists were calling for the terms to be renegotiated and for the "authority of His Majesty" to be preserved. Pacheco re-fortified Toledo, pledging not to disarm until Carlos himself ratified the original treaty. On Candlemas, the night of 2 February 1522, riots broke out after news broke that the Dutch Adriaan Florensz Boeyens had been elected as pope. Pacheco gave one final speech to the city from her balcony, proclaiming that the promised pardon had been rescinded by the royalists.

After royalists began to call for Pacheco's head, the comuneros committed themselves to a last stand against the royalists. Pacheco herself fled the city, disguised as a peasant. Pacheco's sister and brother-in-law secured her escape to Portugal, where she fell into poverty and social isolation. While she earned a meager living as a Latin teacher, she repeatedly appealed to Carlos for amnesty, but was denied each time. María Pacheco ultimately died in her Portuguese exile, in 1531. Her body was buried in the Porto Cathedral.

== Legacy ==
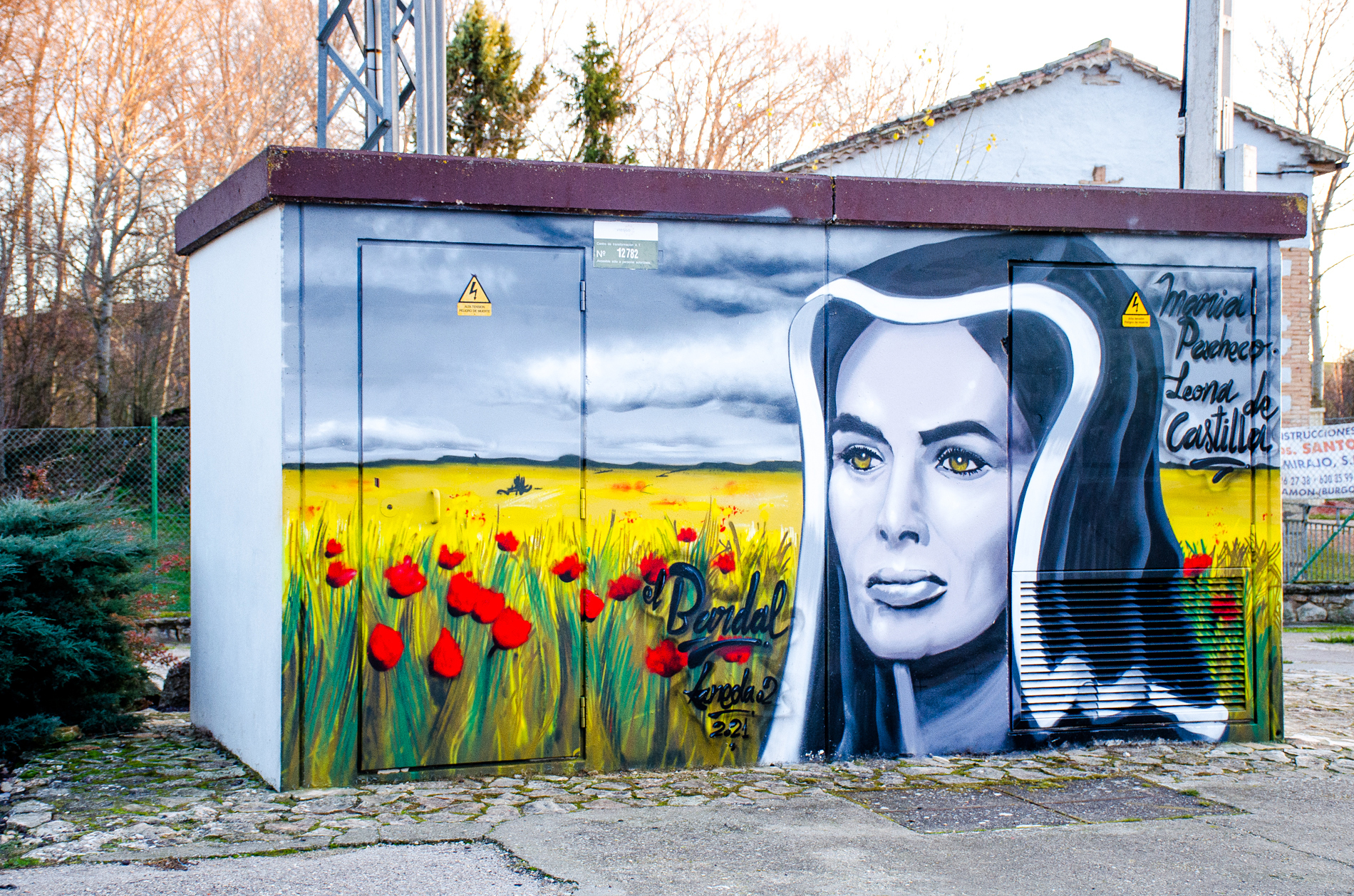
Mural dedicated to María Pacheco, in Villadiego (2021)

Following the defeat of the Revolt of the Comuneros, Habsburg rule was cemented in Castile. In Toledo, the comuneros headquarters were demolished, a monument condemning Pacheco's revolt was raised in the city centre, and salt was ploughed into the earth, preventing plants from growing in the Plaza de Padilla up into the 21st century. Pacheco has variously been depicted throughout history as either a hero and a villain. She was strongly disliked by contemporary chroniclers, due to her transgressions of traditional gender roles by taking up political and military command. Peter Martyr d'Anghiera described her as the "husband of her husband" and depicted her as insane, while Alonzo de Santa Cruz alleged her to have been a practitioner of witchcraft; both of these interpretations were taken up by Antonio de Guevara.

Historian Stephanie Fink De Backer highlighted her among other Castilian rebel women, such as Juana Pimentel, as well as the Castilian queens Isabel and Juana, as examples of exceptional women leaders of the medieval period. Historian Temma Kaplan compared Pacheco and her husband to the Sikh leader Guru Nanak, and English levellers John Lilburne and Elizabeth Lilburne, as examples of advocates of social equality and human rights during the early modern period.

== Bibliography ==
- Fink De Backer, Stephanie (2004). "Rebel with a Cause: The Marriage of María Pacheco and the Formation of Mendoza Identity". In Nader, Helen (ed.). Power and Gender in Renaissance Spain: Eight Women of the Mendoza Family, 1450-1650. University of Illinois Press. pp. 71–92. ISBN 0-252-02868-6.
- Fleming, Gillian B. (2018). "Vengeance (1520-1522)". Juana I: Legitimacy and Conflict in Sixteenth-Century Castile. Palgrave Macmillan. pp. 257–277. doi:10.1007/978-3-319-74347-9. ISBN 978-3-319-74346-2.
- Haliczer, Stephen (1981). "The Royalist Revival and the Collapse of the Revolution". The Comuneros of Castile: the Forging of a Revolution, 1475-1521. University of Wisconsin Press. pp. 180–206. ISBN 0-299-08500-7.
- Kaplan, Temma (2015). "Prophetic Movements and Cities of Promise". Democracy: A World History. Oxford University Press. pp. 18–30. ISBN 978-0-19-517676-6.
- Pérez, Joseph (2018). "María Pacheco". Real Academia de la Historia (in Spanish).
