= Nydala Abbey Bloodbath =

Coordinates: 57°19′22.76″N 14°20′28.57″E

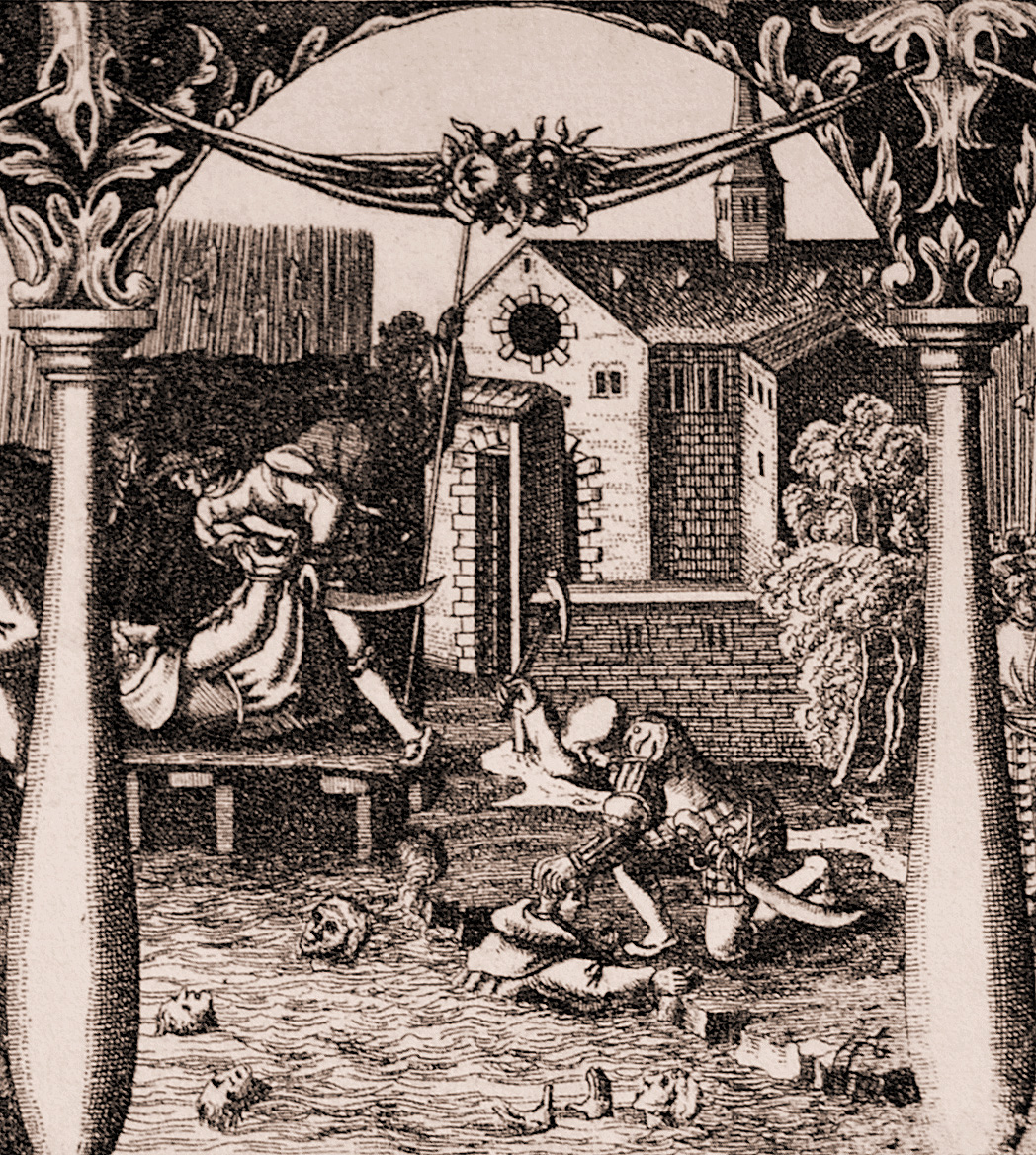
Nydala Abbey Bloodbath

Nydala Abbey Bloodbath (Swedish: Blodbadet i Nydala kloster) in Nydala Abbey, Sweden, on 2 February 1521 was the execution of the abbot and several monks at Nydala Abbey performed by the Danish army on the orders of Christian II of Denmark during their way back to Denmark from the Stockholm Bloodbath, during the Swedish War of Liberation.

The Bloodbath was used by the Swedes to portray Christian II as an evil tyrant during the Swedish War of Liberation, as it was said that the monks were executed without cause or trial by the king. In practice, however, the monks may have been executed because they had cooperated with the Swedes against Christian II, and as the king is confirmed to have been in Denmark the following day, he was most likely not present in Nydala when his army executed the monks.
