= Francisco Maldonado (rebel) =

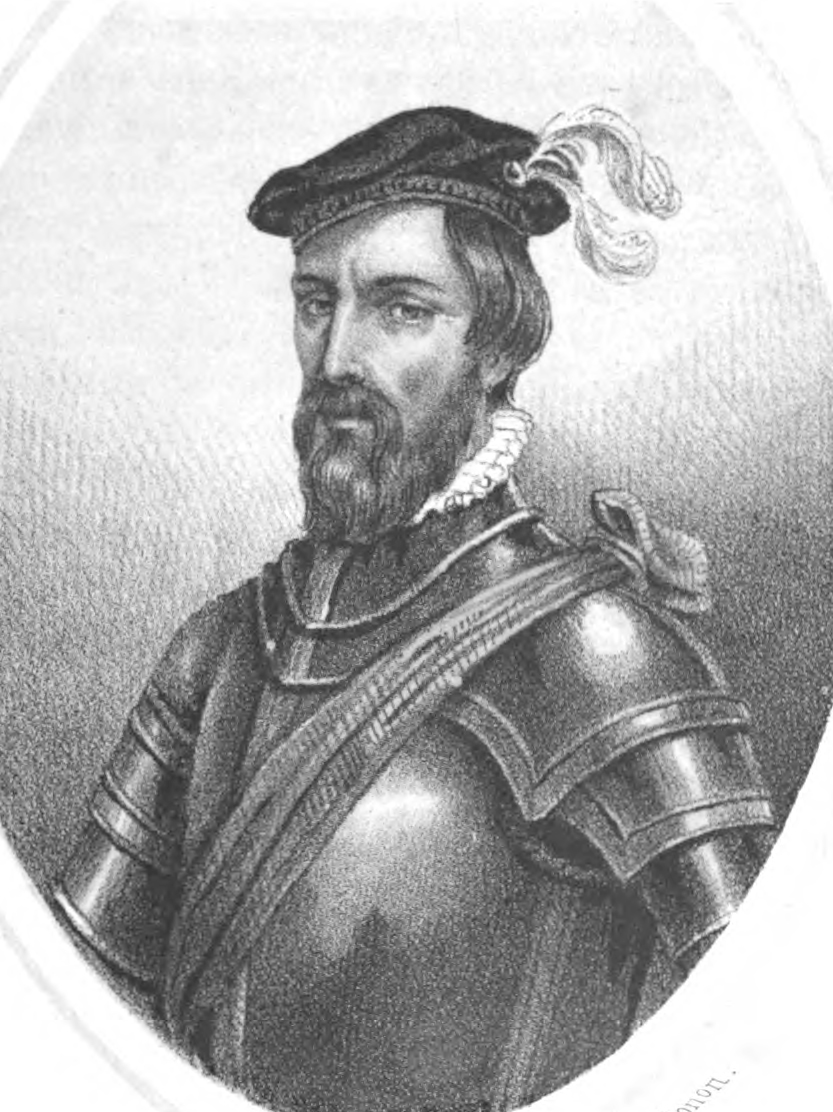

Francisco Maldonado (c. 1480 in Salamanca – 24 April 1521) was a leader of the rebel Comuneros from Salamanca in the Revolt of the Comuneros. He was captured at the Battle of Villalar, and beheaded the following day.
