= Juan López de Padilla =

Castilian leader (1490–1521)

- Captain General of Toledo
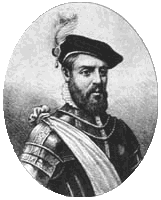
- 19th century portrait of Juan López de Padilla
- Born: 10 November 1490; Toledo, Crown of Castile
- Died: 24 April 1521 (aged 31); Villalar, Crown of Castile
- Buried: La Mejorada monastery, Olmedo
- Spouse: María Pacheco
- Father: Pedro López de Padilla
- Occupation: Hidalgo and revolutionary leader

Juan López de Padilla (1490 – 24 April 1521) was an insurrectionary leader in the Castilian War of the Communities, where the people of Castile made a stand against policies of the Holy Roman Emperor Charles V and his Flemish ministers.

== Life ==
Padilla was born in Toledo, Spain, the eldest son of the commendator of Castile. In 1520, after the Castilian deputies had demanded in vain Charles V's return to Castile, regard for cortes' rights and the administration of their economy by Spaniards, a "holy junta" was formed with Padilla as its head. At first, the junta attempted to establish a national government in the name of Juana of Castile, but lost the support of the nobility when it abolished their privileges and asserted democracy. Though the nobles' army subsequently captured Tordesillas, Padilla led the capture of Torrelobatón and other towns, but any advantage gained was neutralized by the junta after it granted an armistice. When hostilities resumed, their army was comprehensively defeated near Villalar, on 23 April 1521 and Padilla taken prisoner. He was publicly beheaded the following day.

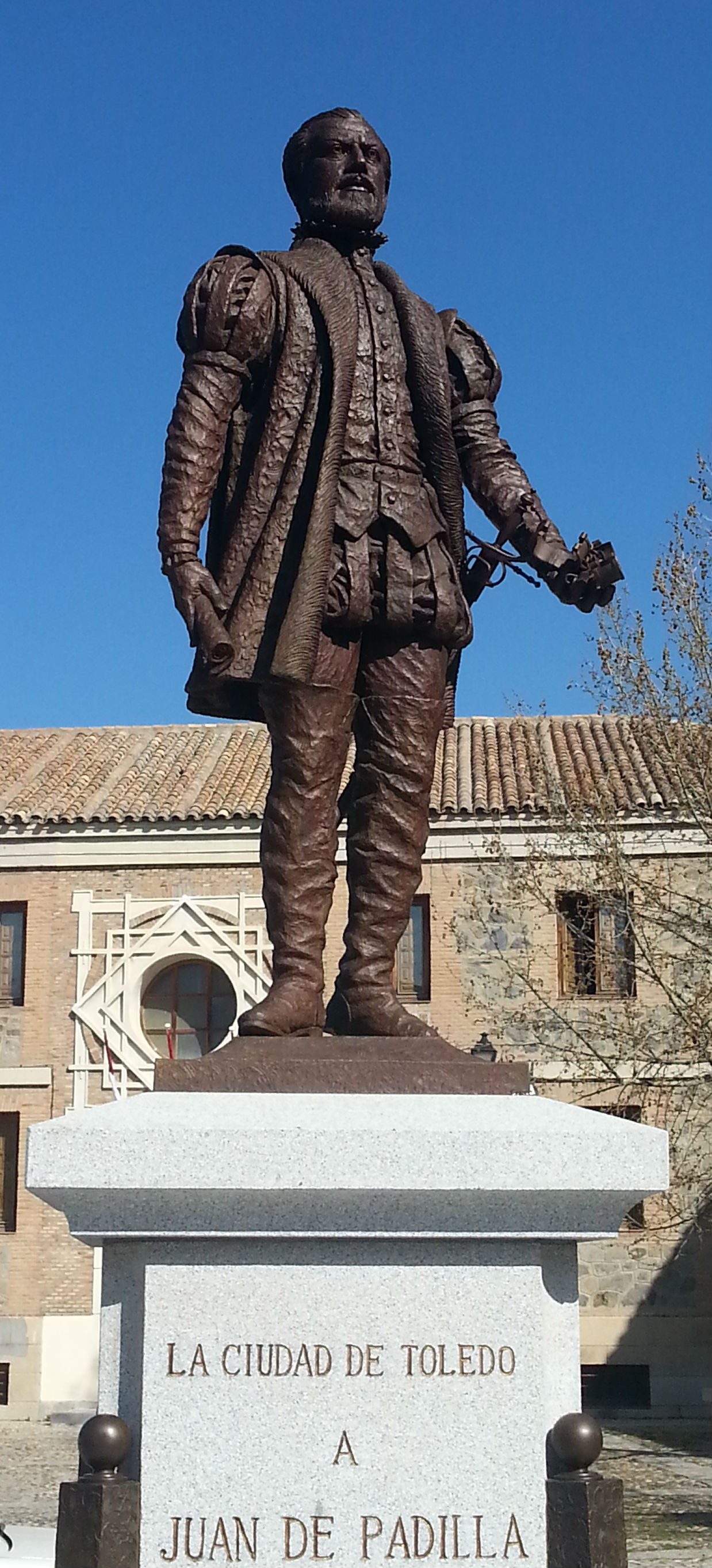
Bronze sculpture of Juan de Padilla, Toledo work of sculptor Julio Martín de Vidales

Afterwards, Padilla's wife, Doña María Pacheco, defended Toledo against the royal troops for six months, but ultimately took refuge in Portugal.

== Eponyms ==
- Juan de Padilla high school, in Illescas, Toledo.
- Juan de Padilla street, in Aranda de Duero, Burgos
- Juan de Padilla street, in Burgos
- Juan de Padilla street, in Málaga
- Juan de Padilla street, in Sevilla
- Juan de Padilla street, in Torrejón de la Calzada, Madrid

== Sources ==
- Chisholm, Hugh, ed. (1911). "Padilla, Juan Lopez de" . Encyclopædia Britannica. Vol. 20 (11th ed.). Cambridge University Press. p. 444.
