= Villalar de los Comuneros =

Coordinates: 41°33′N 5°08′W

Villalar de los Comuneros, Spain
- Flag Coat of arms

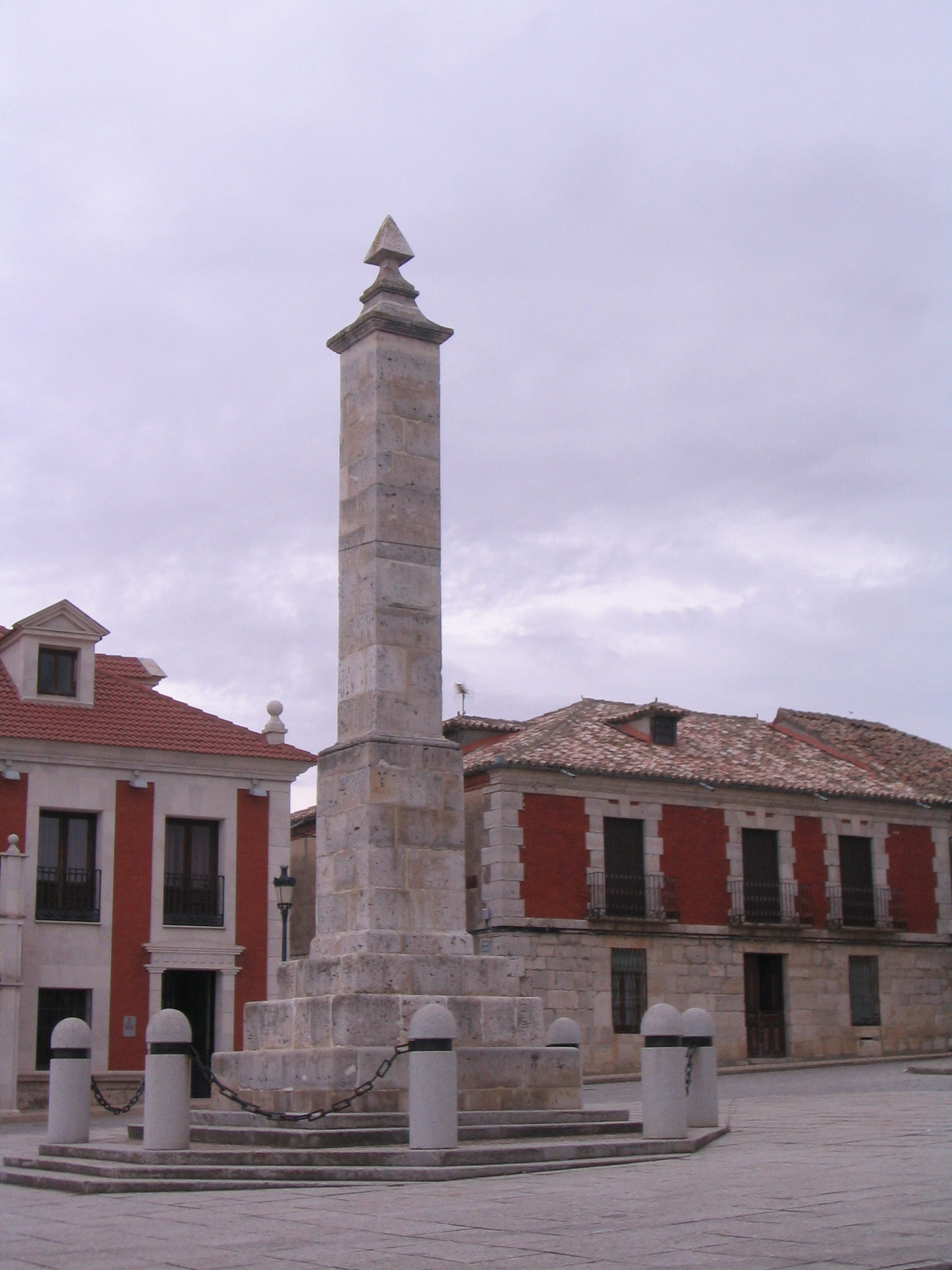
- Monument to the Comuneros in Villalar
- Country: Spain
- Autonomous community: Castile and León
- Province: Valladolid
- Municipality: Villalar de los Comuneros

Area
  - Total: 42.74 km^{2} (16.50 sq mi)
- Elevation: 712 m (2,336 ft)

Population (2025-01-01)
  - Total: 469
  - Density: 11.0/km^{2} (28.4/sq mi)
- Time zone: UTC+1 (CET)
  - Summer (DST): UTC+2 (CEST)

Villalar de los Comuneros is a municipality located in the province of Valladolid, Castile and León, Spain. According to the 2004 census (INE), the municipality had a population of 449 inhabitants.

In its vicinity there was a crucial defeat of the rebels in the Castilian War of the Communities in 1521, the Battle of Villalar.

== See also ==
- Revolt of the Comuneros
- Cuisine of the province of Valladolid
