= William Mark =

British consul in Spain (1782-1849)

British Consul in Málaga
- In office 1824–1837
- Succeeded by: William Penrose Mark

Personal details
- Born: 6 March 1782 Berwick-upon-Tweed, England
- Died: 13 January 1849 (aged 66) Alhaurín el Grande, Spain
- Spouse: Emma Bedwell
- Occupation: Consul, naval accountant
- Known for: Founding the English Cemetery, Málaga

William Mark (Berwick-upon-Tweed, 6 March 1782 - Alhaurín el Grande, 13 January 1849) was a British consul and governor of the British colony in southern Spain, as well as the founder of the English Cemetery in Malaga.

== Early years ==
Born into a large, poor family, at the age of eleven he was taken into the home of a textile merchant who taught him the trade. When he was eighteen, he enlisted in the British Royal Navy, where he was well regarded for his knowledge of accountancy.

Three years after enlisting in the Navy, he was invited to dine on the Victory, where he met Admiral Horatio Nelson, under whom he served for some months. This episode was widely celebrated by Mark, who wrote a book about his experiences in the service of the Admiral.

In 1808 he was posted as an accountant to Gibraltar, where he met Emma Bedwell, whom he married in 1810.

== Diplomatic career ==
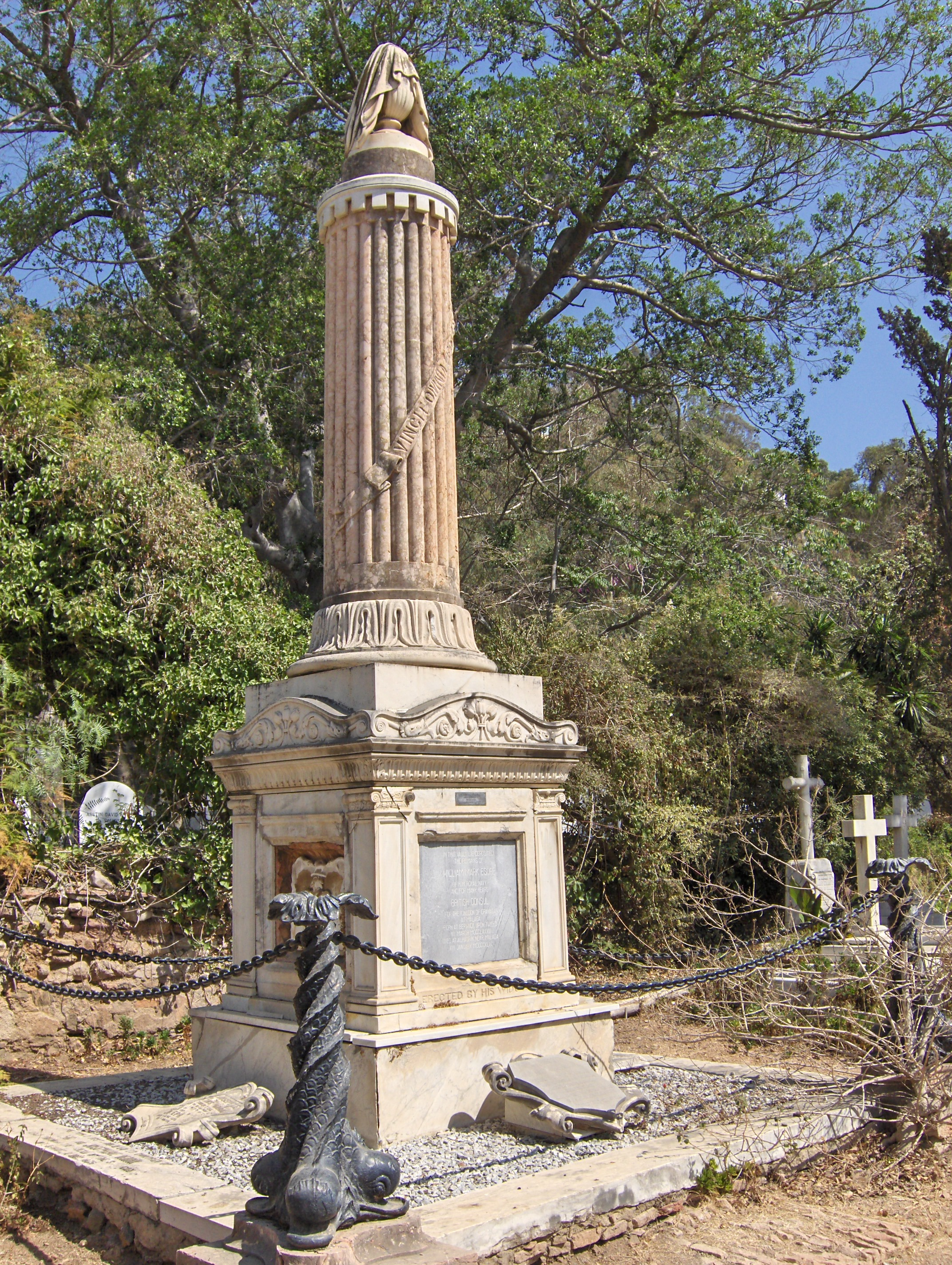
William Mark's funerary monument in the English Cemetery in Malaga.

He was assigned to Malaga to succeed the elderly incumbent consul. Mark and his family arrived in Malaga in 1816, although he did not take up his post as consul until 1824.

Thanks to his efforts as consul to the then governor of Malaga, José Manso, he managed to obtain the concession of a burial place for the British colony in the English Cemetery of Malaga, making it the first of the Anglican Protestant cemeteries to be established in Spain.

Also thanks to his dealings with the Spanish authorities, he managed to rescue the body of young Robert Boyd, who had been shot on the beach of San Andrés, in Málaga, as a result of his participation in the pronunciamiento of the General José María Torrijos. Boyd's body was the second to be buried in the English Cemetery.

He served as consul until 1837. He was succeeded by his son, William Penrose Mark, as consul and governor of the British colony in Spain.

== Death ==
Died in Alhaurín el Grande, near Málaga, on 13 January 1849 and was buried in the English Cemetery in Malaga, where he has a funerary monument.

In 2007, the crypt where his grave is located along with seven other members of the Mark family was discovered by chance underneath the monument to his memory. In addition to William Mark's grave, the crypt also contained the graves of his wife Emma B. Mark (Emma Bedwell), three of his children, the wife of one of them and a one-day-old grandson of William Mark.
