= Robert Boyd (military officer) =

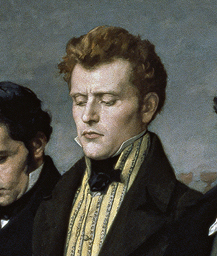
- Robert Boyd portrayed by Antonio Gisbert in the canvas Execution of Torrijos and his Companions on the Beach at Málaga (1887-88).

Robert Boyd (Londonderry, 7 December 1805 - Málaga, 11 December 1831) was a former officer of Irish origin in the army of the British East India Company who accompanied General José María de Torrijos in his insurrection against the absolutism of Ferdinand VII, and was shot on 11 December 1831 on the beaches of San Andrés. Robert Boyd is depicted in the painting by Antonio Gisbert entitled Execution of Torrijos and his Companions on the Beach at Málaga.

== Early life ==
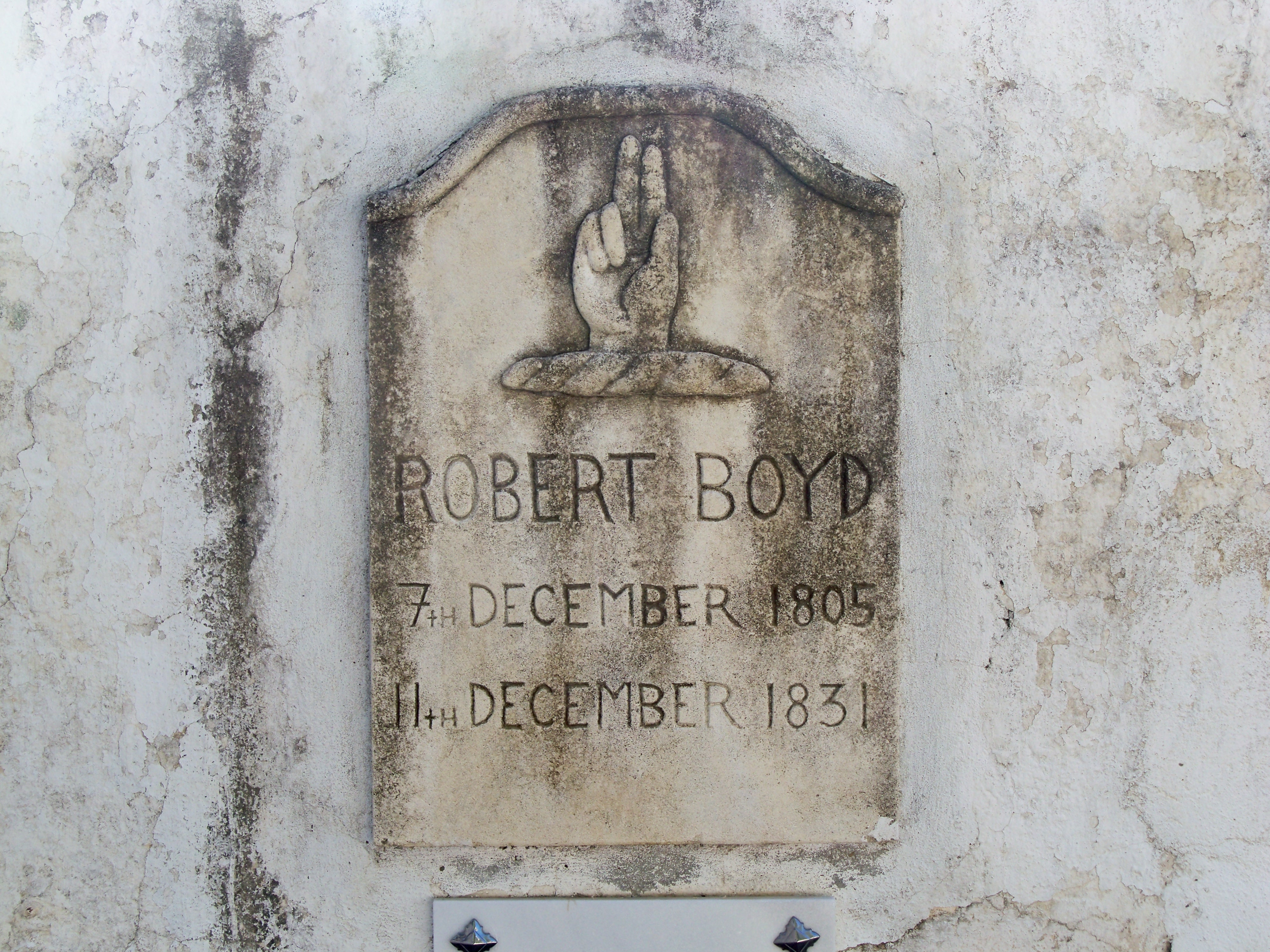
Gravestone dedicated to Robert Boyd in the original enclosure of the English Cemetery in Malaga.

He was the third of four siblings from a wealthy family, the son of Archibald Boyd, treasurer of Londonderry, and Anne McNeill, a native of Scotland.

In 1824, on his nineteenth birthday, Robert decided to enlist in the army, serving as a cadet in the army of the British East India Company. In 1826 he rose to the rank of lieutenant and was posted as a volunteer to the 65th Native Infantry Regiment in the city of Mutra, India, later moving to Agra. There he enlisted as a volunteer to fight in the Greek War of Independence against the Ottoman Empire.

== Torrijos' pronunciamiento ==
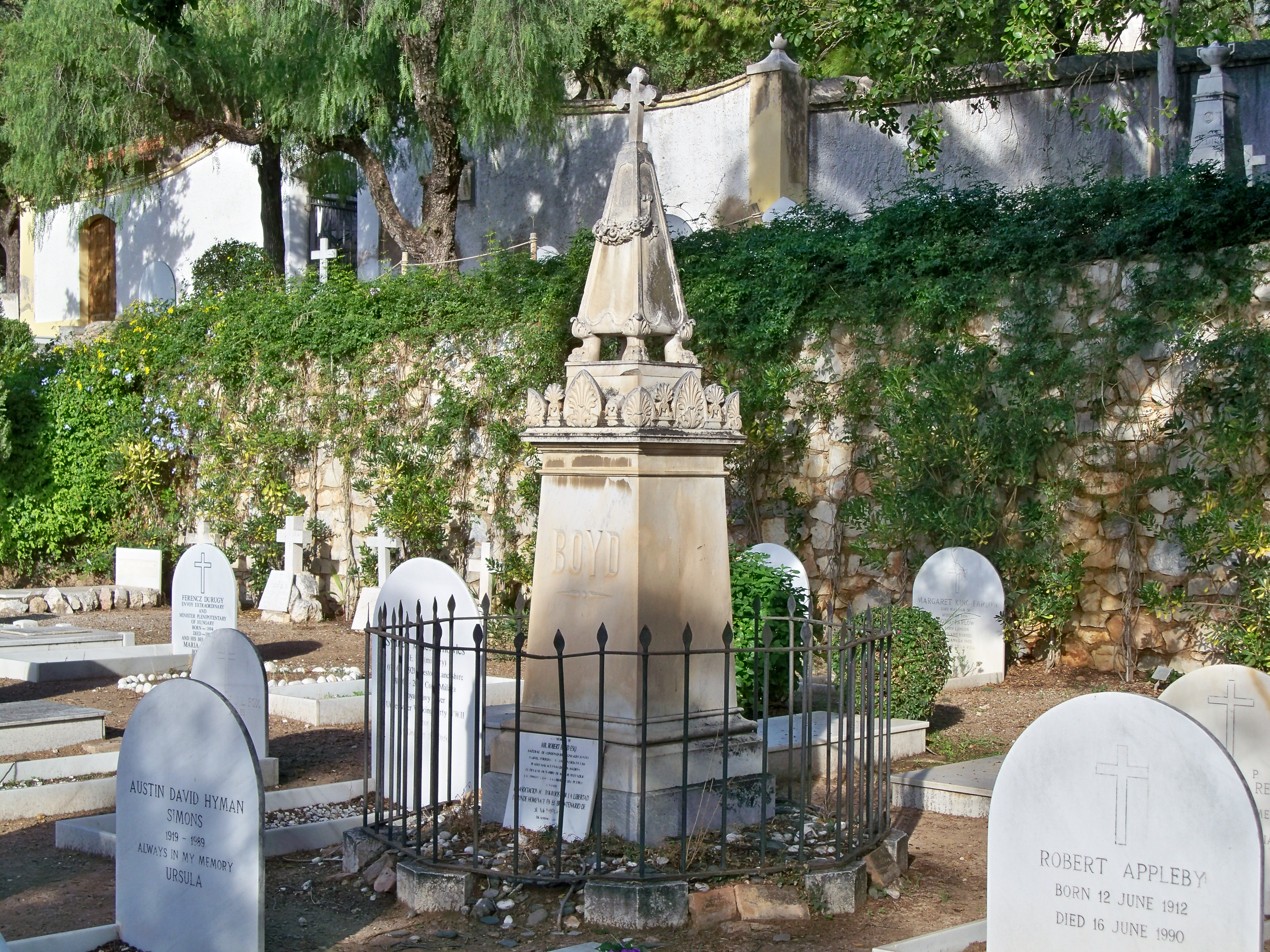
Cenotaph to Robert Boyd at the English Cemetery in Málaga.

In 1829, he returned to his hometown, eager for adventure with the large inheritance he had received, some four or five thousand pounds. His cousin John Sterling, son of the influential editor of The Times, had organised a group of young intellectuals called "The Cambridge Apostles" who were engaged in collaborating with the Spanish general José María de Torrijos, exiled in London, in his conspiracy to overthrow the absolutist regime of the monarch Ferdinand VII. Boyd decided to join the plans of the Spanish liberals and to earmark the inheritance for their cause, in addition to his own participation in the enterprise, letting Torrijos know "that his existence and his assets were the patrimony of liberty, which he did not consider the prerogative of certain peoples, but the beneficent goddess that should reign over all the earth".

After the failure of the conspiracy and Torrijos's pronunciamiento, Boyd was eventually shot with the rest of his comrades on the beach of San Andrés on 11 December 1831. Robert wrote a last letter to his brother William from the refectory of the Convent of San Andrés, where they were confined.

His body was buried by the British Consul William Mark in the English Cemetery in Málaga, which had been completed four months earlier. Robert Boyd was the second person buried in the English Cemetery, the first within the walls of the primitive cemetery.

== Acknowledgement ==
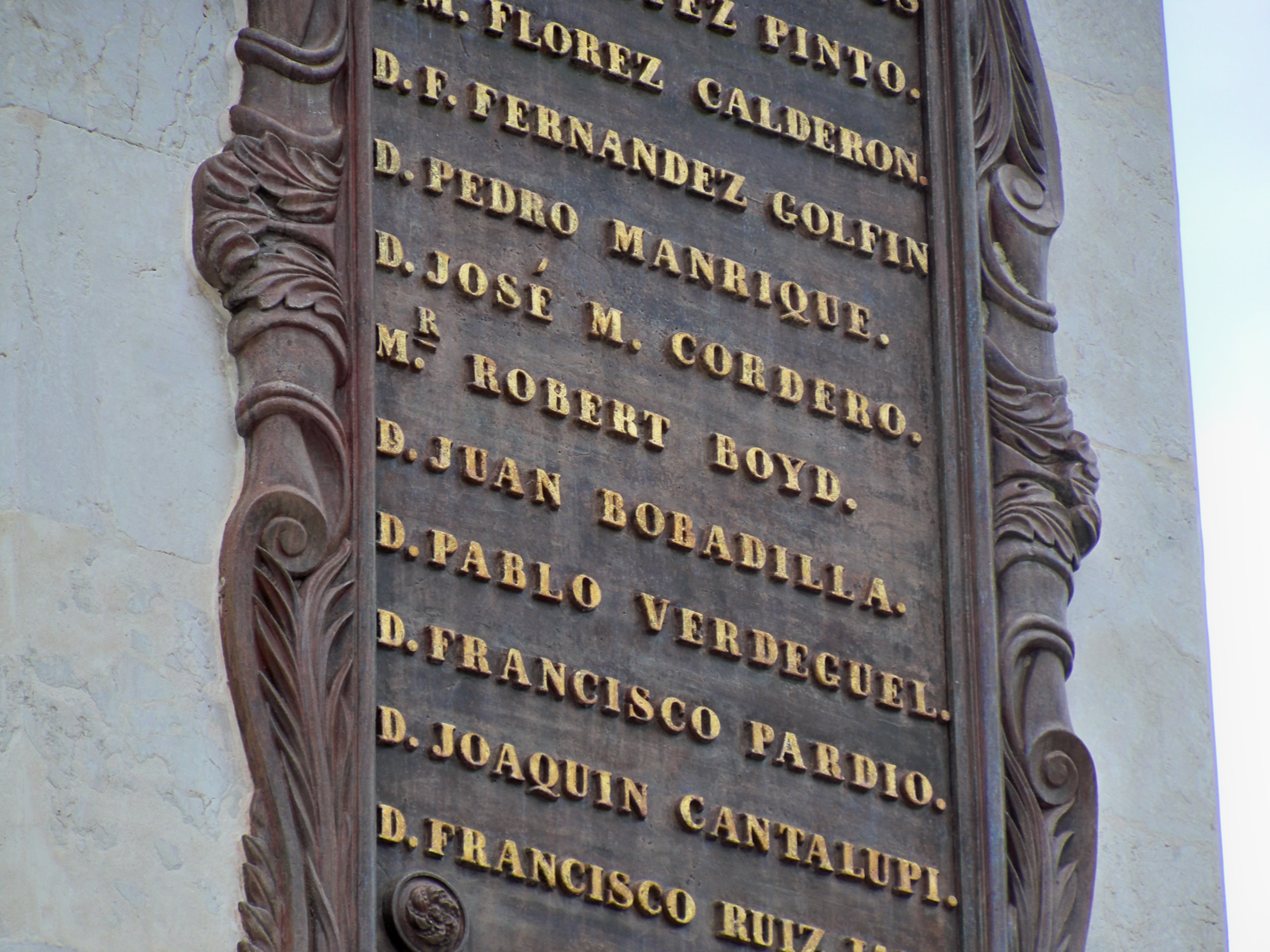
Name of Robert Boyd on the monument to the general Torrijos in Plaza de la Merced, Málaga.

His name appears on the monument to Torrijos in the Plaza de la Merced in Málaga. He also has a cenotaph in the English Cemetery, and a gravestone and a commemorative plaque installed by the association Torrijos 1931 in 2004 next to the place where it is believed that his tomb may be, within the primitive enclosure of the cemetery.

On 31 January 2002, the Málaga City Council approved the dedication of a street in the Huelin neighbourhood, although it was not inaugurated until 6 December 2004.

St Augustine's Church in Derry, Boyd's home town, has a memorial to his attempt to overthrow absolutism in Spain.

In 2021, the University of Malaga established Spain-Ireland awards. This included the Robert Boyd Award to be granted to research works focused on the historical relations between Spain and Ireland.
