= Military rebellion =

Military rebellion may refer to:

- Coup d'état, an illegal deposition of a government
- Pronunciamiento, a form of military rebellion or coup d'état peculiar to Spain and the Spanish American republics
