= Spanish Eclectic =

Spanish Eclectic may refer to:

- Eclecticism in architecture, a style of architecture
- Spanish Eclecticism, a style or painting
