= Anthony Coningham Sterling =

British Army officer and historian (1805–1871)

Sir Anthony Coningham Sterling KCB
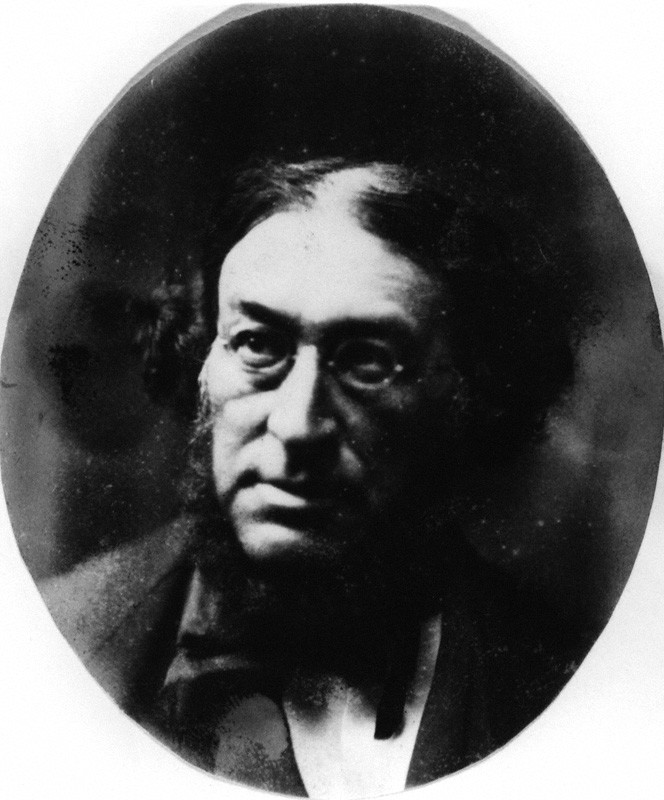
- Born: 1805; Dundalk, County Louth, Ireland
- Died: 1 March 1871 (aged 65–66); Knightsbridge, London
- Education: Trinity College, Cambridge
- Military career
- Allegiance: United Kingdom
- Branch: British Army
- Rank: Colonel
- Conflicts: Alma; Balaklava; Inkerman; Siege of Sevastopol
- Awards: Legion of Honour

Colonel Sir Anthony Coningham Sterling KCB (1805 – 1 March 1871) was a British Army officer and historian, author of The Highland Brigade in the Crimea.

== Life ==
Sterling, eldest son of Captain Edward Sterling, by Hester, daughter of John Coningham of Derry, was born at Dundalk in 1805. John Sterling, the man of letters, was a younger brother.

After keeping some terms at Trinity College, Cambridge, he was on 18 February 1826 gazetted ensign in the 24th Foot. From 21 March 1834 to 5 December 1843 he was a captain in the 73rd Foot, and was then placed on half-pay. He was on active service during the Crimean campaign of 1854–5, first as brigade major of the Highland brigade and afterwards as assistant adjutant-general to the Highland division, including the battles of the Alma, Balaklava, and Inkerman, and the siege of Sebastopol. He received the medal with four clasps, the order of the Legion of Honour, the Turkish medal, and the fourth class of the Medjidie.

On 17 October 1857 he sold his commission, retiring with the rank of colonel; but during 1858–1859 he was again employed as military secretary to Sir Colin Campbell, 1st Baron Clyde, in the suppression of the Indian Rebellion of 1857, and received a medal with clasp. In 1861 Lord Clyde accused Sterling of wilfully neglecting to insert the name of Colonel Pakenham in a list of persons recommended for reward by the bestowal of the KCB at the close of the mutiny. This led to many letters, which are given in Correspondence concerning Charges made by Lord Clyde against Sir Anthony Sterling, March 1861 (privately printed 1863). He was gazetted CB on 5 July 1855, and KCB on 21 July 1860.

He died at 3 South Place, Knightsbridge, London, on 1 March 1871, having married in 1829 Charlotte, daughter of Major-General Joseph Baird; she died on 10 April 1863.

== Works ==
Sterling was the author of:

- Russia under Nicholas I, a translation, 1841
- Letters from the Army in the Crimea, written by a Staff Officer, 1857
- The Story of the Highland Brigade in the Crimea, founded on Letters written during 1854, 1855, and 1856 by Lieut.-Col. A. Sterling, a Staff Officer who was there, 1895.

== Sources ==
- Boase, George C. (1898). "Sterling, Sir Anthony Coningham (1805–1871), army officer and historian". Dictionary of National Biography Vol. LIV. Smith, Elder & Co.
