= Edward Sterling =

British journalist

Edward Sterling (1773 – 1847) was a British journalist.

== Life ==
He was the son of the Rev. Anthony Sterling, and was born at Waterford. He was educated at Trinity College Dublin. Called to the Irish Bar, he fought as a militia captain at the Battle of Vinegar Hill, and then volunteered with his company into the line. On the break-up of his regiment he went to Scotland and took to farming at Kames Castle.

In 1810, Sterling and his family moved to Llanblethian in the Vale of Glamorgan, and during his residence there Edward Sterling, under the signature of "Vetus," contributed a number of letters to The Times. These were reprinted in 1812, and a second series in 1814. In that year he moved to Paris, but on the escape of Napoleon from Elba in 1815 took up residence in London, obtaining a position on the staff of The Times; and during the late years of Thomas Barnes's administration he was practically editor. His fiery, emphatic and oracular mode of writing conferred those characteristics on The Times which were recognized in the nickname, the "Thunderer."

== Family ==
In 1804 Sterling married Hester Coningham. Her uncle Walter Coningham (died 1830) had made a fortune through the sugar plantations of St Vincent, and his money, based on slave labour, supported the Sterlings. The couple had seven children, of whom five died young, The remaining sons were:

- Colonel Sir Anthony Coningham Sterling (1805–1871). He served in the Crimean War and as military secretary to Lord Clyde during the Indian Mutiny; and was the author of The Highland Brigade in the Crimea and other books.
- John Sterling (1806–1844), man of letters.
