= John Sterling (author) =

Scottish author (1806–1844)

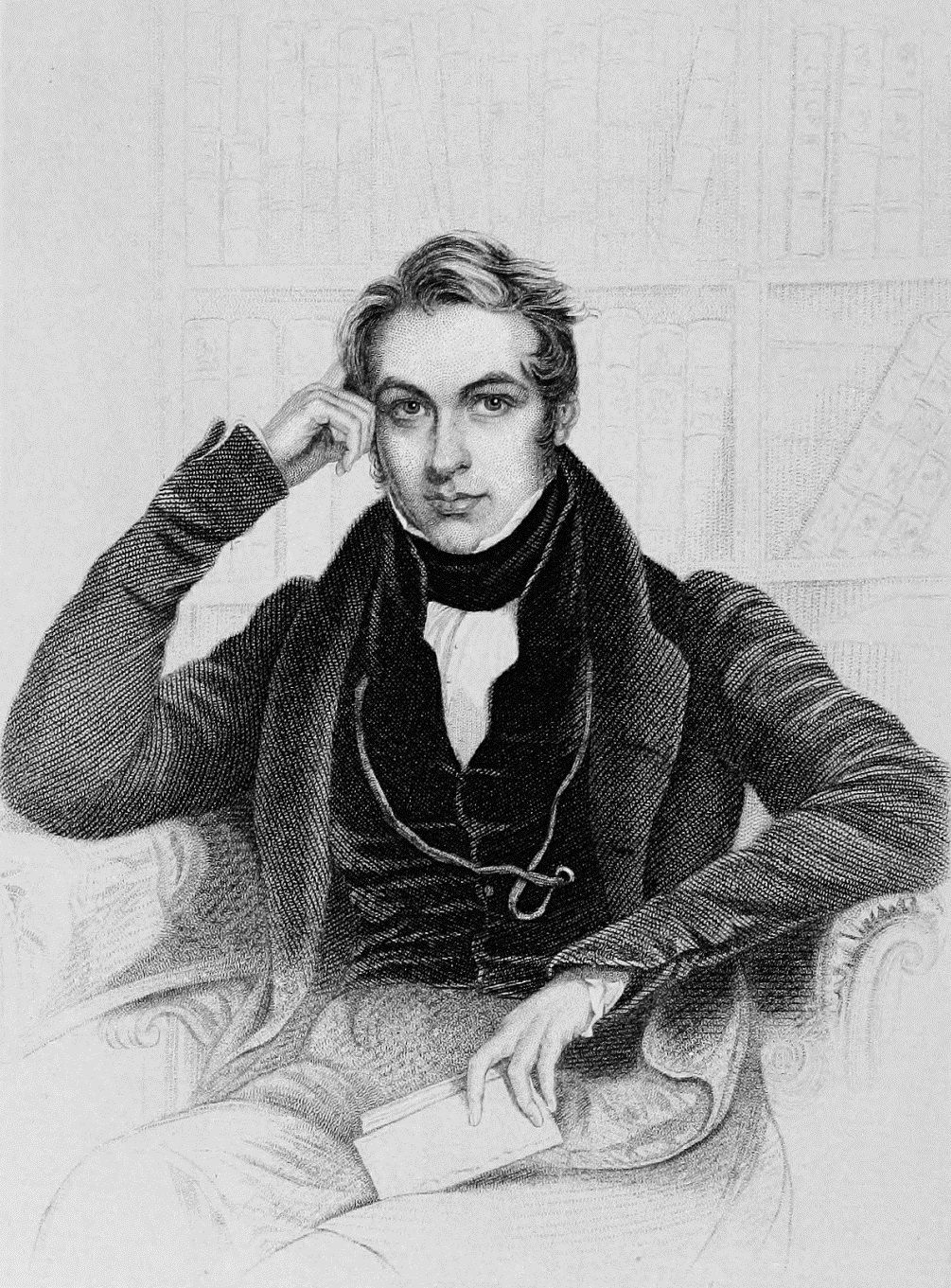
Portrait of John Sterling, 1830

John Sterling (20 July 1806 – 18 September 1844) was a Scottish writer.

== Life ==
Sterling was born at Kames Castle on the Isle of Bute, the son of Edward Sterling. After studying for a year at the University of Glasgow, he in 1824 entered Trinity College, Cambridge, where he had for tutor Julius Charles Hare. At Cambridge he took part in the debates of the Cambridge Union Society, and became a member of the Cambridge Apostles, forming friendships with Frederick Denison Maurice and Richard Trench. He moved to Trinity Hall with the intention of graduating in law but left the university without taking a degree.

During the next four years, Sterling resided chiefly in London, employing himself actively in literature and making a number of literary friends. With F. D. Maurice he purchased the Athenaeum magazine in 1828 from James Silk Buckingham, but the enterprise was not a financial success. He also formed an intimacy with the Spanish revolutionary General Torrijos, in whose unfortunate expedition he took an active interest. He raised funds for Spanish liberal exiles to carry out their plans for insurrection, and his words influenced young Robert Boyd to give his family inheritance to Torrijos's cause. On 2 November 1830, at Christ Church, Marylebone, Sterling married Susannah, daughter of Lieutenant-General Charles Barton (1760–1819) and his wife Susannah.

Shortly after his marriage in 1830 symptoms of tuberculosis induced Sterling to take up his residence on the island of St Vincent, where he had inherited some property, and he remained there for fifteen months before returning to England. While at St Vincent he wrote "So far as I see, the Slaves here are cunning, deceitful and idle; without any great aptitude for ferocious crimes, and with very little scruple at committing others. But I have seen them much only in very favorable circumstances. They are, as a body, decidedly unfit for freedom; and if left, as at present, completely in the hands of their masters, will never become so, unless through the agency of the Methodists." After spending some time on the Continent in June 1834, Sterling was ordained and became curate at Hurstmonceux, where his old tutor Julius Hare was vicar. Acting on the advice of his physician, he resigned from his clerical duties in the following February, but, according to Carlyle, the primary cause was a divergence from the opinions of the Church. There remained to him the "resource of the pen," but, having to "live all the rest of his days as in continual flight for his very existence," his literary achievements were necessarily fragmentary.

In 1841 Sterling moved to Falmouth, and lectured to the Royal Cornwall Polytechnic Society. He died at Ventnor on 18 September 1844, his wife having died in the preceding year.

== Works ==
Sterling published in 1833 Arthur Coningsby, a novel, which attracted little attention, and his Poems (1839), the Election, a Poem (1841), and Strafford, a tragedy (1843), were not more successful. He had, however, established a connection in 1837 with Blackwood's Magazine, to which he contributed a variety of papers and several tales. Among these papers were allegorical fantasy stories such as "The Onyx Ring", "Land and Sea", "A Chronicle of England" and "The Palace of Morgana."

John Sterling's papers were given to the joint care of Thomas Carlyle and Hare. Essays and Tales, by John Sterling collected and edited, with a memoir of his life, by Julius Charles Hare, appeared in 1848 in two volumes. Carlyle was dissatisfied with the Memoir and wrote a vivid Life (1851).

Sterling corresponded with John Stuart Mill, who had attended the informal beginnings of his 'Sterling Club'.

== Family ==
His son, Major-General John Barton Sterling (1840–1926), after entering the navy, went into the army in 1861, and had a distinguished career (wounded at Tel-el-Kebir in 1882), both as a soldier and as a writer on military subjects. He commanded the Coldstream Guards until his retirement in 1901. He was a member of the Athenaeum Club and the Royal Yacht Squadron.
