= The Execution of the Comuneros of Castile =

Painting by Antonio Gisbert

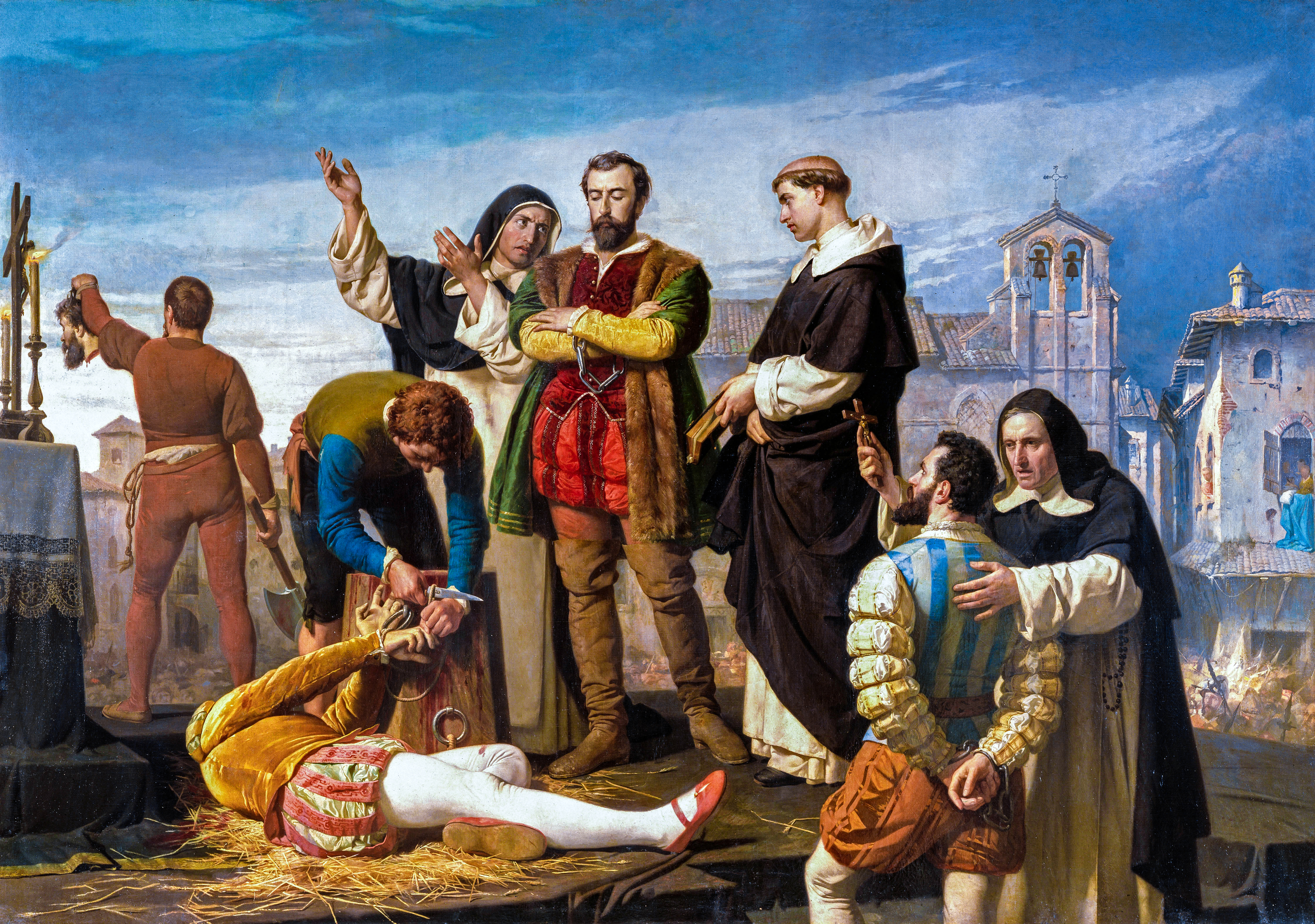
- Artist: Antonio Gisbert Pérez
- Year: 1860
- Medium: Oil on canvas
- Dimensions: 255 cm × 365 cm (100 in × 144 in)
- Location: Palacio de las Cortes; Madrid

The Execution of the Comuneros of Castile (Spanish: Ejecución de los comuneros de Castilla) is a history painting by Antonio Gisbert, from 1860.

Gisbert painted the oil on canvas in Rome. He presented the painting to the 1860 National Exhibition of Fine Arts, where he won a first-class medal. The Congress of Deputies purchased the painting for 80,000 reales. The painting depicts the execution of the three leaders of the Revolt of the Comuneros on 24 April 1521 in Villalar. Traditionally exhibited at the Palacio de las Cortes in Madrid, the painting was temporarily moved to the seat of the Cortes of Castile and León in Valladolid in occasion of the 500th anniversary of the depicted event in 2021.
