= Execution of Torrijos and his Companions on the Beach at Málaga =

1888 painting by Antonio Gisbert Pérez

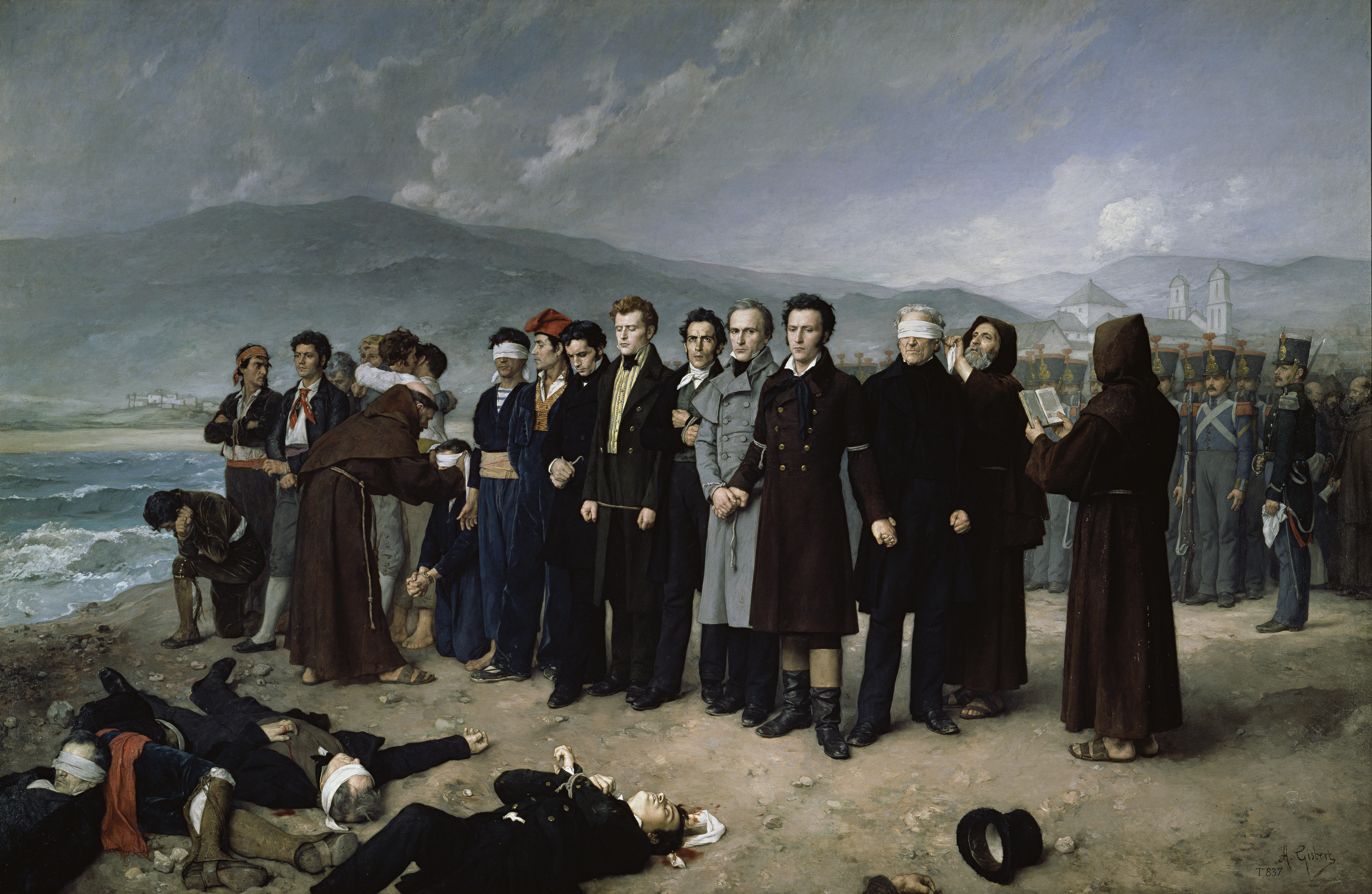
- Artist: Antonio Gisbert Pérez
- Year: 1888
- Medium: Oil on canvas
- Dimensions: 390 cm × 601 cm (150 in × 237 in)
- Location: Museo del Prado; Madrid

The Execution of Torrijos and his Companions on the Beach at Málaga (Spanish: Fusilamiento de Torrijos y sus compañeros en las playas de Málaga) is a painting by Antonio Gisbert Pérez. It is considered to be one of the finest pieces of Spanish history painting from the 19th century. Commissioned by Prime Minister Práxedes Mateo Sagasta in 1886, Gisbert completed in 1888; It has been used as vehicle for conveying the Spanish nation building from a perspective of the defence of Liberty.

On 11 December 1831, following direct orders from Ferdinand VII and without any sort of trial, José María Torrijos was executed on the beach of Málaga, together with other companions (such as Manuel Flores Calderón and Francisco Fernández Golfín), including both military and civilians. The painting depicts the scene. Today, it is displayed in Madrid's Museo del Prado.

== Description and characteristics ==
José María de Torrijos y Uriarte, also known as General Torrijos, was a Spanish liberal soldier and politician remembered above all for his bitter fight against the absolutism that King Ferdinand VII wanted to impose, which cost Torrijos prison and exile.

An outstanding military man who became captain general of Valencia, field marshal and minister of war during the Liberal Triennium (1820–1823), Torrijos prepared the so-called Torrijos pronouncement from his exile in England (1824–1830), where he lived thanks in part to the aid granted by the Duke of Wellington to the Spanish exiles who had fought under his command in the Spanish War of Independence. On December 2, 1831, together with sixty of his closest associates, he landed on the beaches of Malaga from Gibraltar. There he was betrayed by Governor Vicente González Moreno, who had promised him his support, and they were captured by absolutist troops. Eight days later, on December 11 and without trial, Torrijos was shot along with forty-eight of his companions on the beaches of Malaga.

In the painting, the prisoners are lined up with their hands tied, while some friars are busy blindfolding them and trying to offer the condemned one last consolation. Behind them the firing squad awaits orders, while in the foreground, on the ground, some men lie already dead in a clearly Goyesque detail.

Torrijos is in the center of the composition, standing out slightly from the rest of the characters. To his left, holding his hand, is an elderly man, Francisco Fernández Golfín, former Minister of War, and to the right, holding his hand, Manuel Flores Calderón, dressed in a pale frock coat. To his right are Colonel López Pinto, the English officer Robert Boyd and Francisco Borja Pardio.
