= Spanish Eclecticism =

Movement among Spanish painters from 1845-1890

Spanish Eclecticism was a movement among Spanish painters from 1845 to 1890. It was named after the tendency by artists to select from among multiple established styles of that era. A sensibility of relative renewal dominated the rest of Europe, while in Spain, Realism and Impressionism were slow to take hold. The movement is also said to be associated with the idea that models and innovations had run their course.

== Criticism ==
Detractors consider it to be among the least brilliant periods in Spanish painting, in which there was a highly respectable level of skill, but no significant advancement of the form. This extends as far as the claim that practitioners used enormous canvases, of many meters in surface area, to give importance to something which didn't have any.

== Themes ==
Spanish history was a predominant theme, especially from the Middle Ages and the reign of the Catholic Monarchs (Reyes Católicos). Anecdotal and sentimental scenes were the most popular, depicting highpoints of Spanish history with a human perspective, though not venturing beyond the earthly specifics of the subject. The style was frequently boosted by official establishments such as the Salones de Otoño (Salons of Autumn) and the Spanish Academy itself, which was chiefly interested in rigorous drawing and historical documentation.

== Development ==
The subject of landscapes gained prominence with Spanish Romanticism until it became almost exclusive around the time of the Belgian painter Carlos de Haes, the first professor of landscape painting at the Spanish Academy. At the same time, a Catalan tendency toward urban and bourgeois scenes was developing. It eventually culminated in Catalan Pre-impressionism, which arrived with Marià Fortuny and Eduardo Rosales. Fortuny was credited with creating the tableautin (small tableau), a diminutive format depicting a comic or pleasant theme mainly intended to adorn the interior of a home.

== Artists ==
The movement was exemplified by Francisco Pradilla Ortiz and Cano de la Peña. Two others, Antonio Gisbert and José Casado del Alisal, were exponents of the bipartisan front for the imperial political regime of the time.

== Sources and references ==
- Artehistoria.com Spanish Eclecticism article (in Spanish)
- Entry for Marià Fortuny i Marsal in Gran Enciclopèdia Catalana (in Catalan)
- Artehistoria.com biography of Mariano Fortuny (in Spanish)
- Artehistoria.com biography of Eduardo Rosales (in Spanish)
- Artehistoria.com article on Spanish Romanticism (in Spanish)
- Artehistoria.com article on Carlos de Haes (in Spanish)
- Artehistoria.com article on Jose Casado del Alisal (in Spanish)
- Artehistoria.com article on Antonio Gisbert (in Spanish)
