= Antonio Gisbert =

Spanish artist (1834–1901)

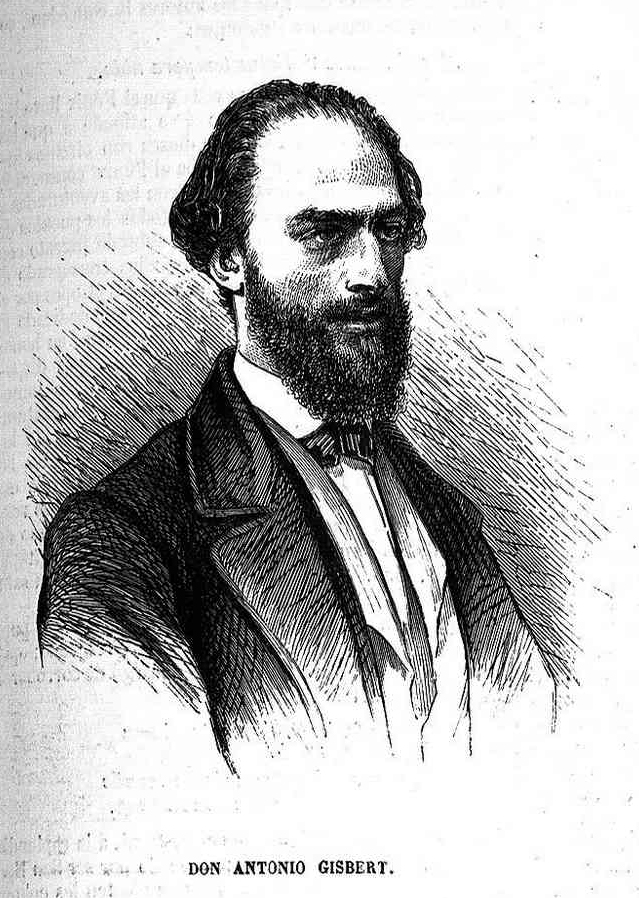
Antonio Gisbert; from El Museo Universal (1880)

Antonio Gisbert Pérez (19 December 1834 – 27 November 1901) was a Spanish artist situated on the cusp between the realist and romantic movements in art. He was known for painting pictures of important events in a country's history in a realistic style, yet clearly with a political aim as well; his variance in styles puts him in the Spanish eclectic school of painters. He generally tried to promote liberal causes in his politics and paintings.

== Career ==
Gisbert was born in Alcoy on December 19, 1834. He began his artistic studies at the Real Academia de Bellas Artes de San Fernando in Madrid in 1846, working under José de Madrazo.

Gisbert became the Director of the Museo del Prado in Madrid in 1868. He stayed in that position until 1873, when he resigned because of opposition to the new First Spanish Republic. He moved permanently to Paris and died there on November 27, 1901.

== Works ==
- El fusilamiento de Torrijos y sus compañeros en la playa de Málaga ("The Execution of Torrijos and his companions at Málaga Beach"), his best-known work. It was made in 1888, and resides in the Museo del Prado.
- Los Comuneros de Castilla ("The Comuneros of Castile", variously translated otherwise as "The Execution of the Comuneros of Castile" or "Comuneros on the Scaffold"), an oil-on-canvas work which he debuted at the Exposición Nacional of 1860 where it won first prize.
- María de Molina presenta a su hijo Fernando IV en las Cortes de Valladolid de 1295 (1863).
- Retrato de Salustiano Olózaga (1867)
- El rey Amadeo I ante el cadáver del general Prim (Amadeo I in front of the coffin of General Prim)
- Retrato del rey Amadeo I de España (Portrait of King Amadeo I of Spain)
- Partida de Cristóbal Colón (Departure of Christopher Columbus)

== Gallery ==
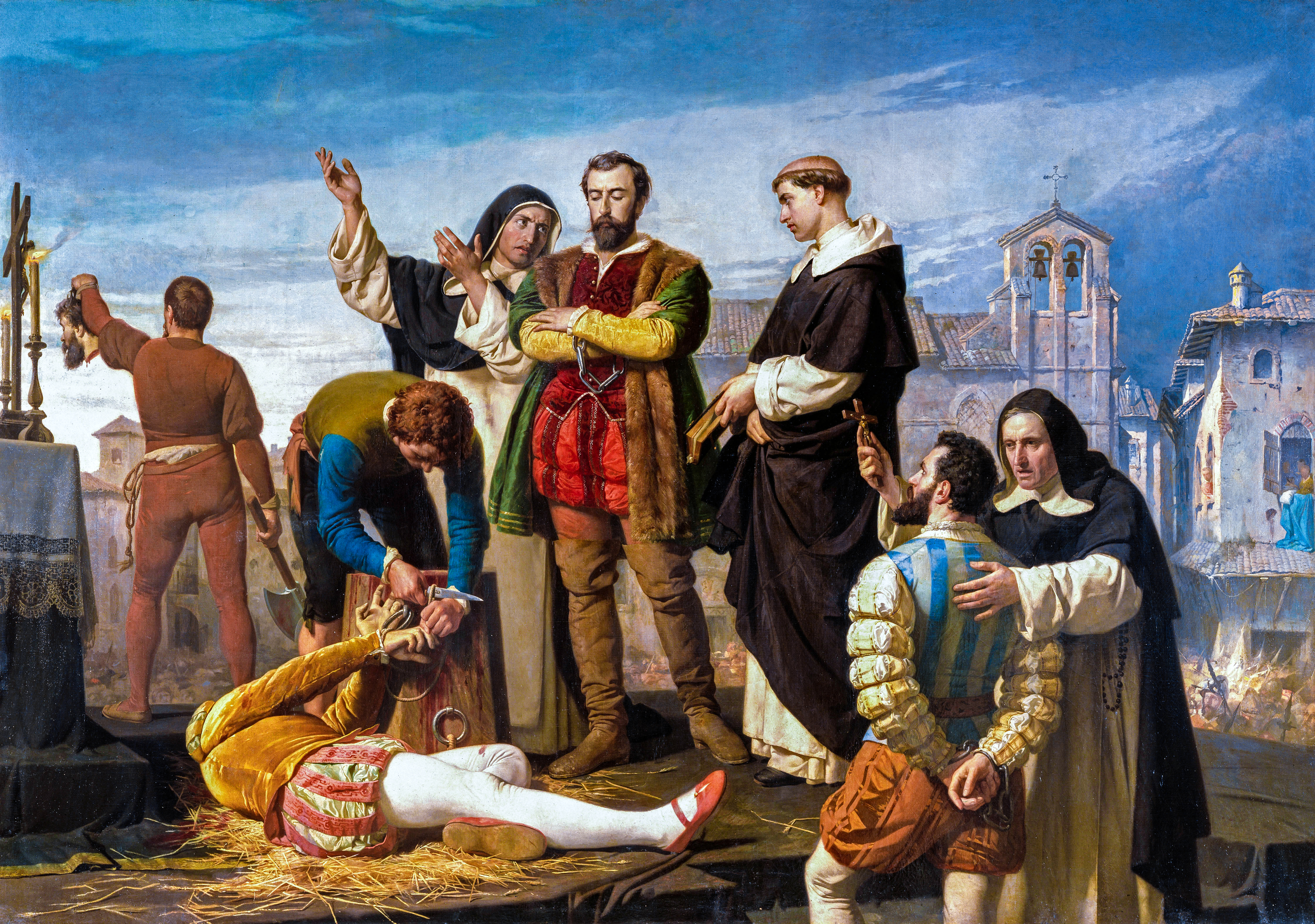
The Execution of the Comuneros of Castile (1860)

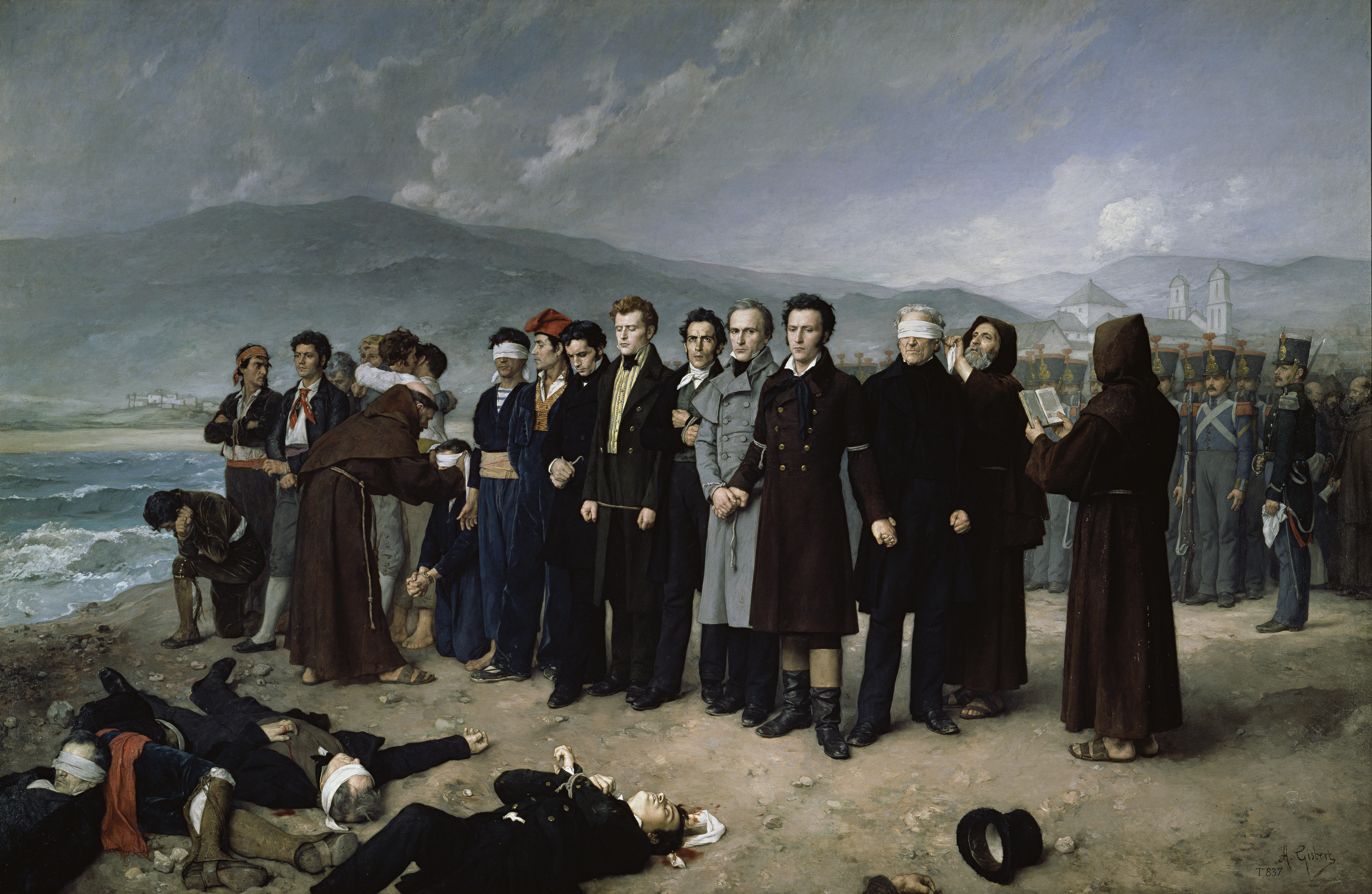
The Execution of Torrijos and his Companions at Málaga Beach (1888)

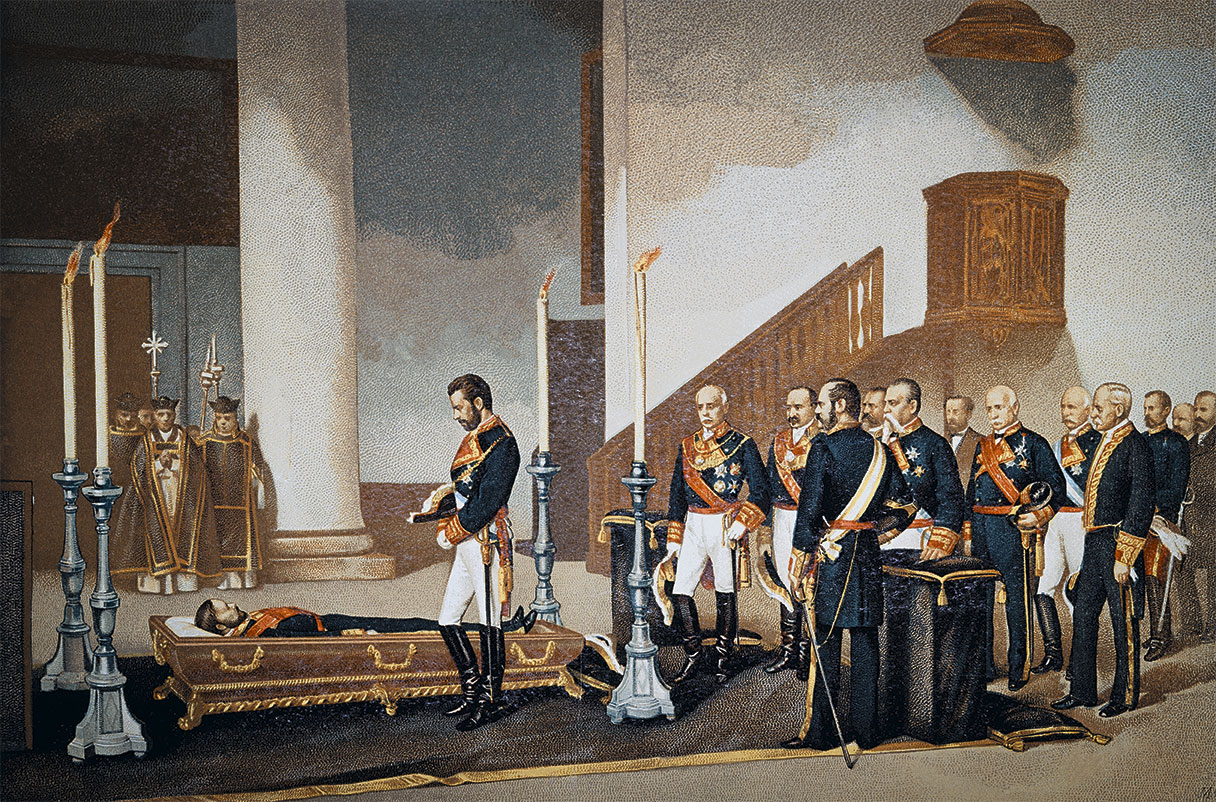
Amadeo I in front of the coffin of General Prim (1870)
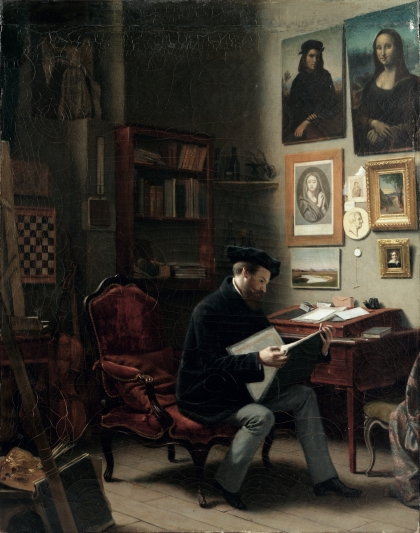
Self-portrait (1865)

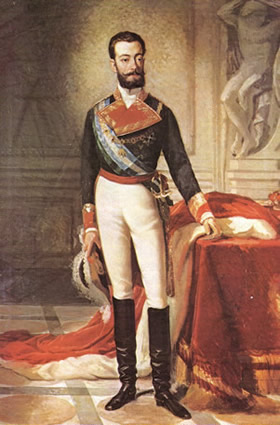
Portrait of Amadeo I
