= English Cemetery, Málaga =

Anglican cemetery of Málaga

Coordinates: 36.7212°N 4.4071°W

English Cemetery in Málaga Cementerio Inglés de Málaga
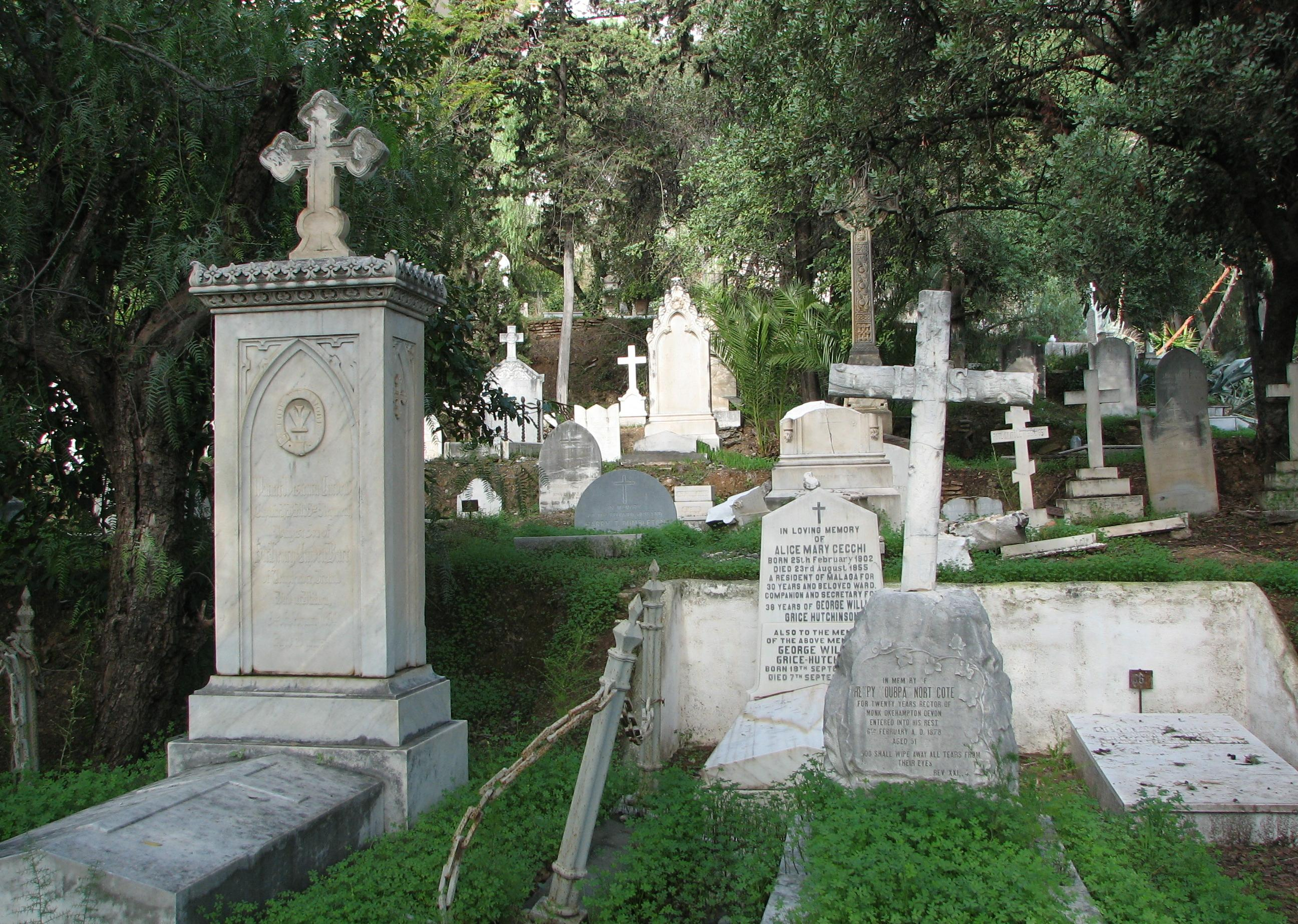
- Interactive map of English Cemetery in Málaga; Cementerio Inglés de Málaga

Details
- Established: 1831
- Location: Málaga
- Country: Spain
- Type: Anglican cemetery
- No. of interments: 1,000 +
- Website: Official website

The English Cemetery in Málaga (Spanish: Cementerio Inglés de Málaga), or Anglican Cemetery, or Cemetery of St George, is the oldest non-Roman Catholic Christian cemetery established on mainland Spain.

== History and description ==
The English Cemetery in Málaga, where St George's Anglican Church stands, is the result of the inspiration and concern of William Mark, who was British Consul in Málaga from 1824 until 1836. In the eight years he had lived in Málaga before his appointment as Consul, he had looked "with great disgust" on the way Protestants had to be buried on the sea shore at dead of night, because those who professed a creed other than Catholicism could not be buried in consecrated ground, namely in the parish churches, monasteries and cemeteries of Málaga.

Due to his persistent efforts, Mark was finally given permission to create a permanent cemetery on the Vélez road outside the walls of the city, thanks to the Royal Order of Ferdinand VII, issued on 11 April 1830. The adjoining mortuary is now the church library.

During the years immediately after 1830, the cemetery was greatly extended, and in 1839–40 a "lodge temple" was built in classical style with a small chapel and incorporating the cemetery guard's dwelling. With its fine Doric columns, this structure was adapted and enlarged in 1890–91 to become the present St George's Anglican Church.

In 1856, a gatehouse was constructed in Gothic style at the entrance to the cemetery.

The cemetery covers over 8,000 m^{2} (2.0 acres) and contains more than 1,000 graves. The cemetery is also a botanical garden with a number of unusual specimens of trees and plants. With several well-known people buried there, it has become one of Málaga's historical sites.

In 2005 the cemetery gatehouse, for many years the home of the cemetery gardener, was renovated and now houses a small Visitors' Centre and gift shop as well as providing space for St George's Church lunches and other activities. The Gatehouse is staffed by volunteers, mainly from the church, and is providing a modest but steady income for both the church and the cemetery.

== Ownership and management ==
From its inception, the cemetery was the property of the British Government. However, no funds had been provided for its upkeep for many years. After several years' work, formal registration of the English Cemetery in Málaga Foundation was granted on 13 July 2010. The Foundation is now responsible for the management of the cemetery. Its Board comprises three Spaniards, three Britons, one German and one Italian, and includes three members of St George's Church. (The church is administered by the Chaplaincy). The President of the Board is a former British Consul in Málaga.

== Notable interments ==
Among the notables buried here are:

- Robert Boyd (1805–1831), revolutionary, executed with General Torrijos in a failed attempt to overthrow King Ferdinand VII
- Gerald Brenan (1894–1987), British writer
- Geoffrey Beyts (1908–2000), British Brigadier who informed Elizabeth II she was the Queen on her father's death.
- Marjorie Grice-Hutchinson (1908–2003), English economist
- John Goodnow (1868–1907), United States Consul General, Shanghai
- Jorge Guillén (1893–1984), Spanish poet, a member of the Generation of '27
- Aarne Haapakoski (1904–1961), Finnish writer
- Henry Hamilton Bailey (1894–1961), influential author of surgical textbooks.
- Rowland Langmaid (1897–1956), British seaman, engraver, artist and war artist.
- Gamel Woolsey (1895–1968), American poet and novelist
- Desmond Bristow (1917–2000), British intelligence officer during World War II, head of the Spanish section of the British intelligence service in Spain after the war

and the Captain and some crew of the German corvette SMS Gneisenau, wrecked off Málaga in 1900.

== Gallery ==
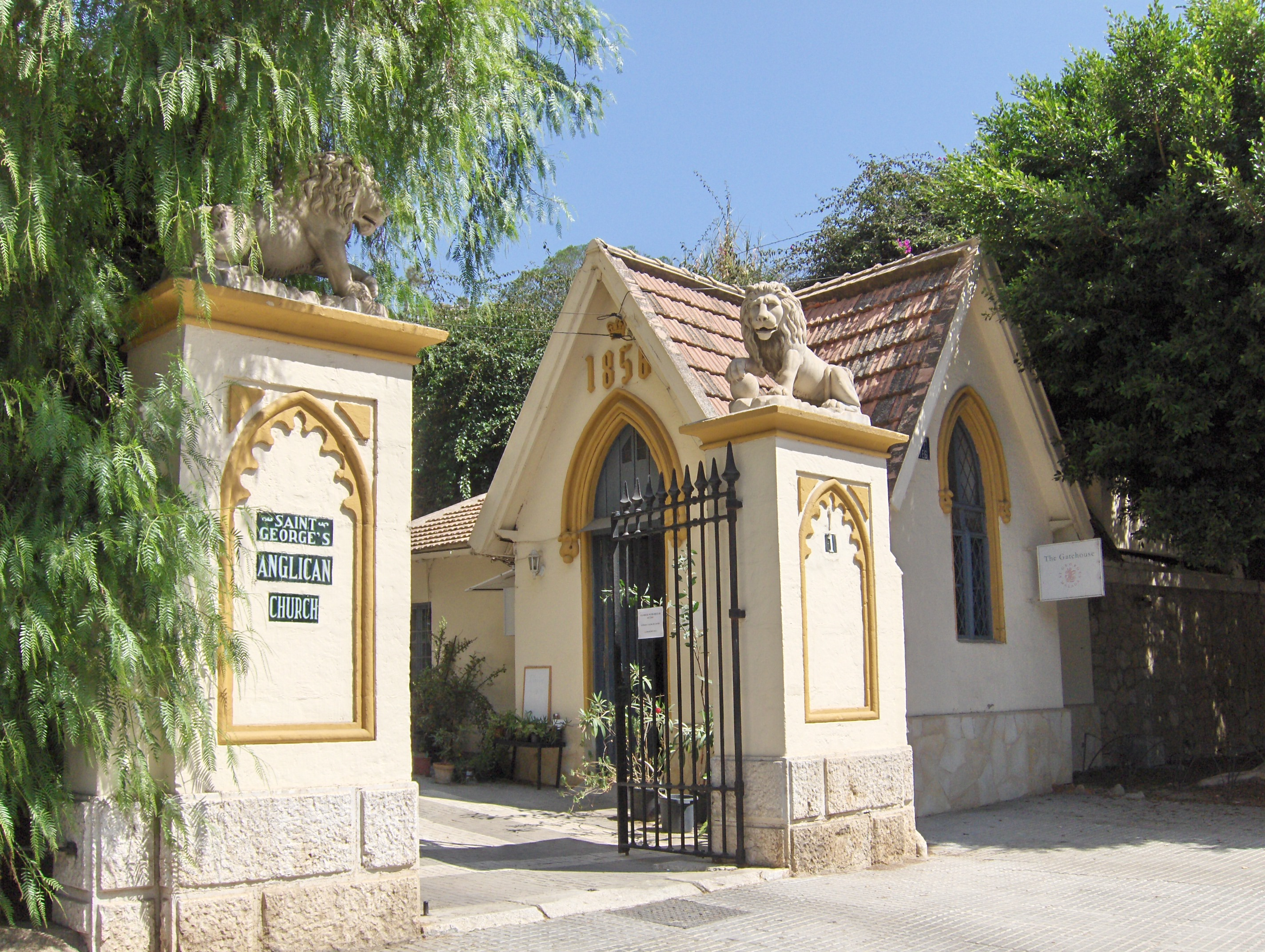
Cemetery entrance

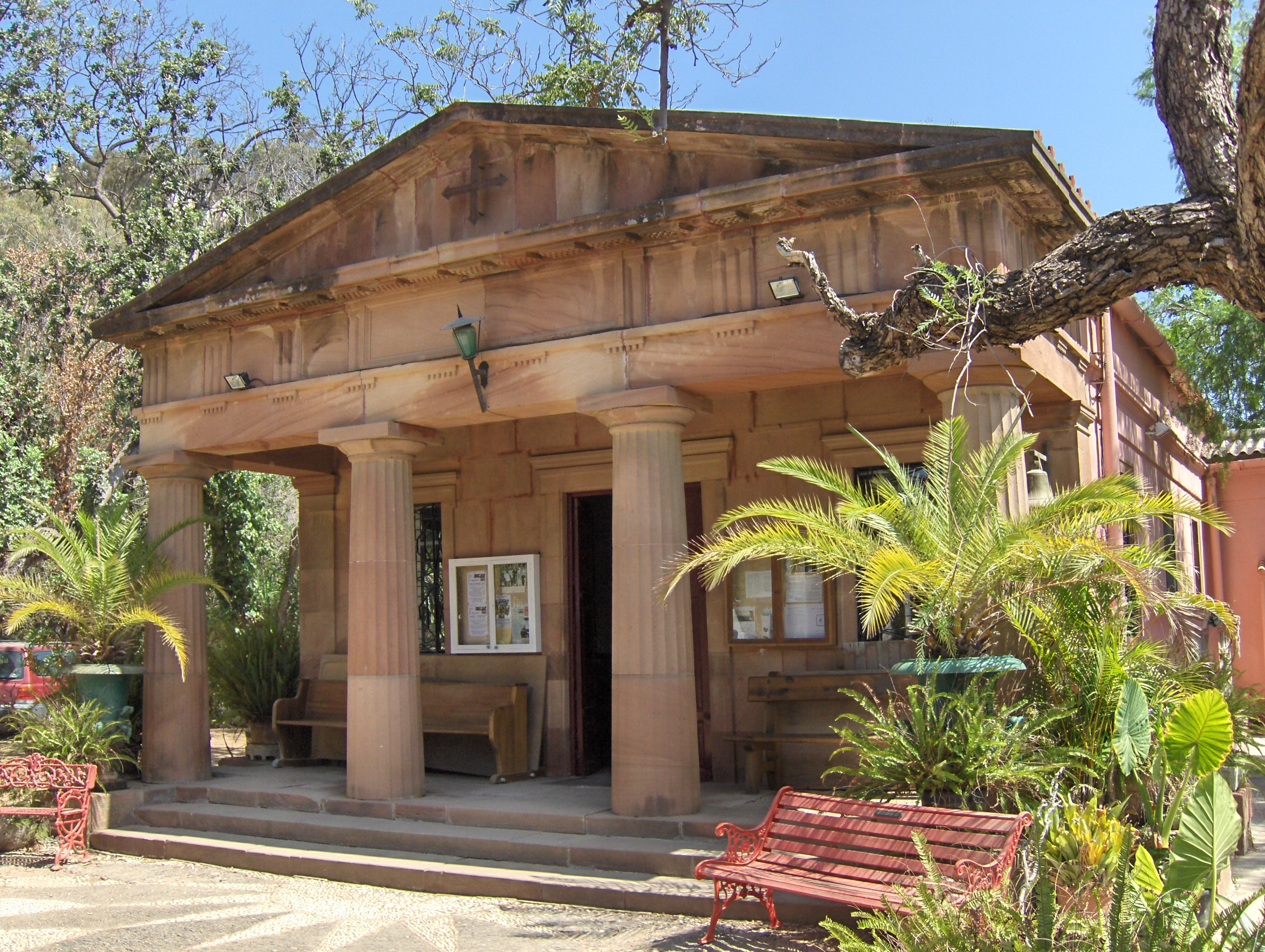
Saint George cemetery chapel

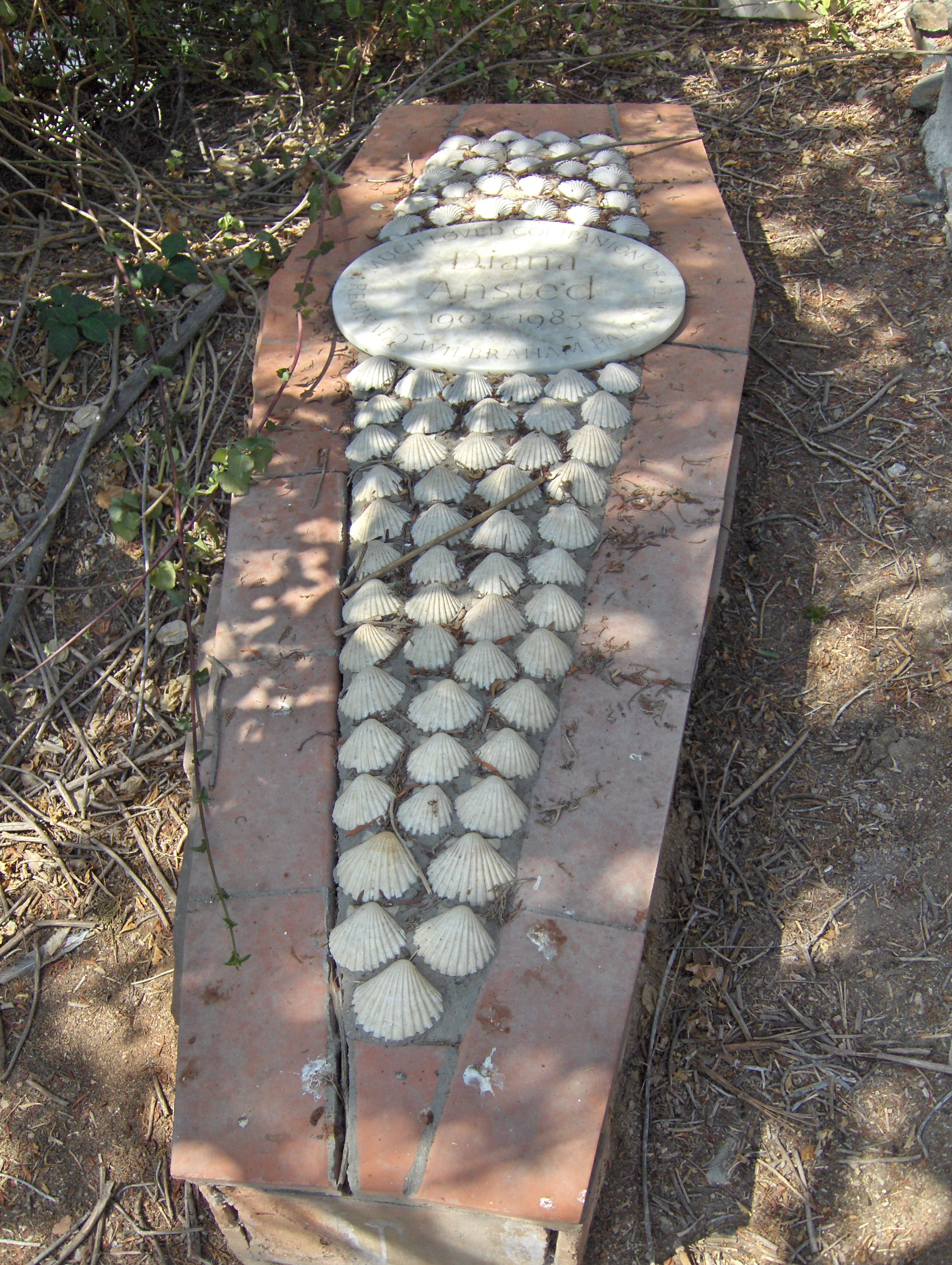
Grave decorated with scallops

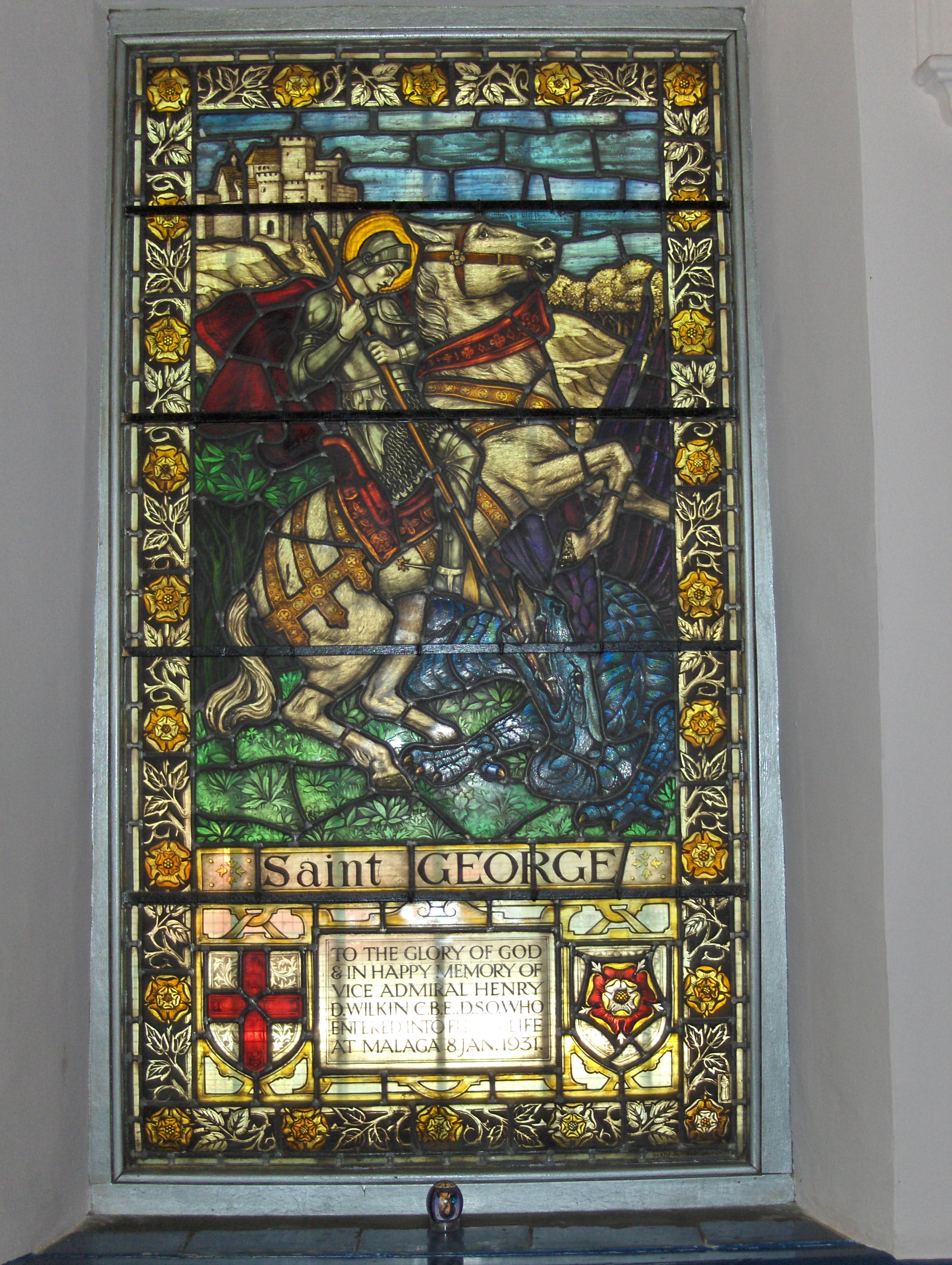
Stained glass of St. George at the cemetery

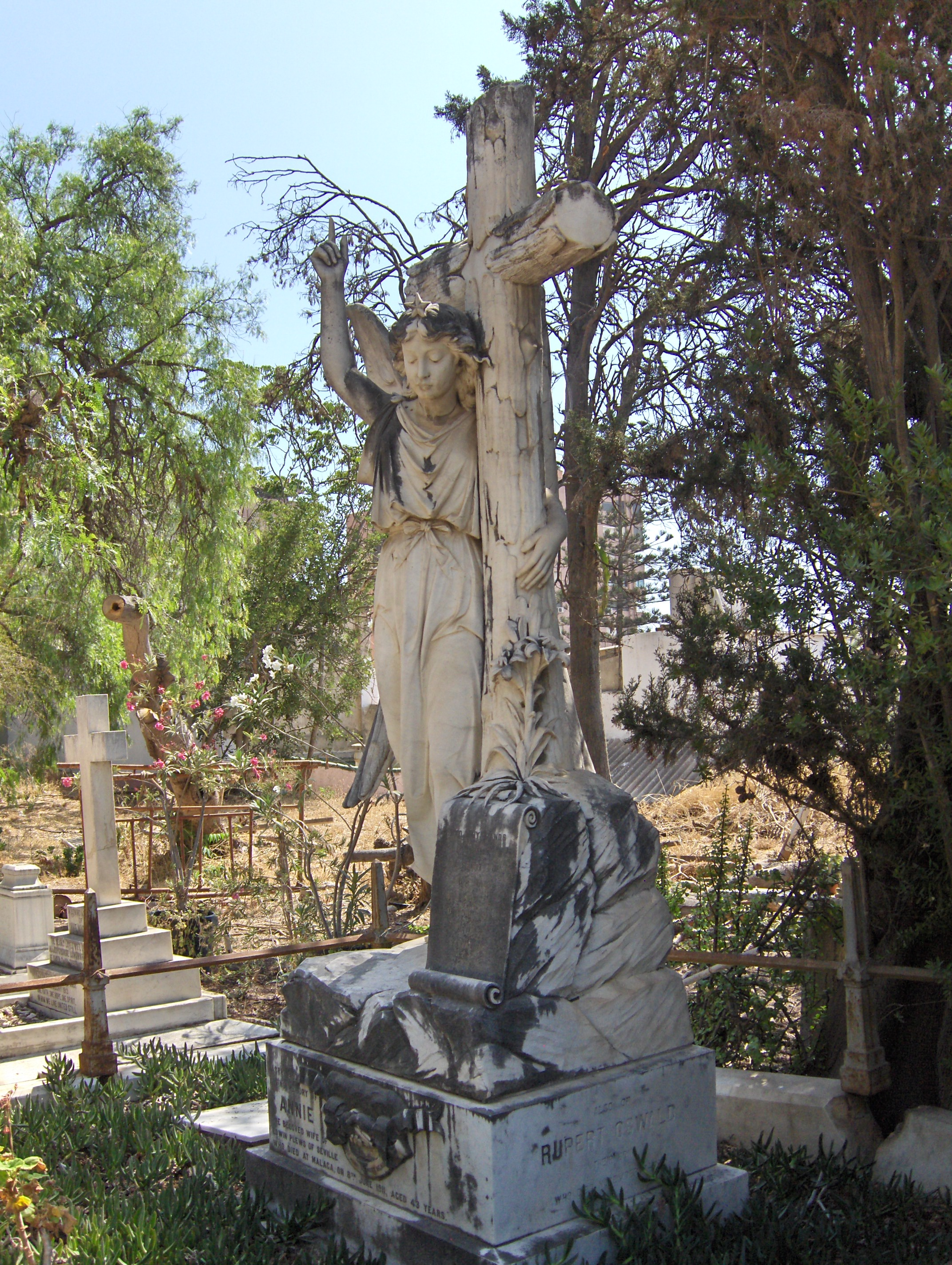
Grave of Mary Ann (Annie) Plews
