= Pronunciamiento =

Spanish and Portuguese term for coups

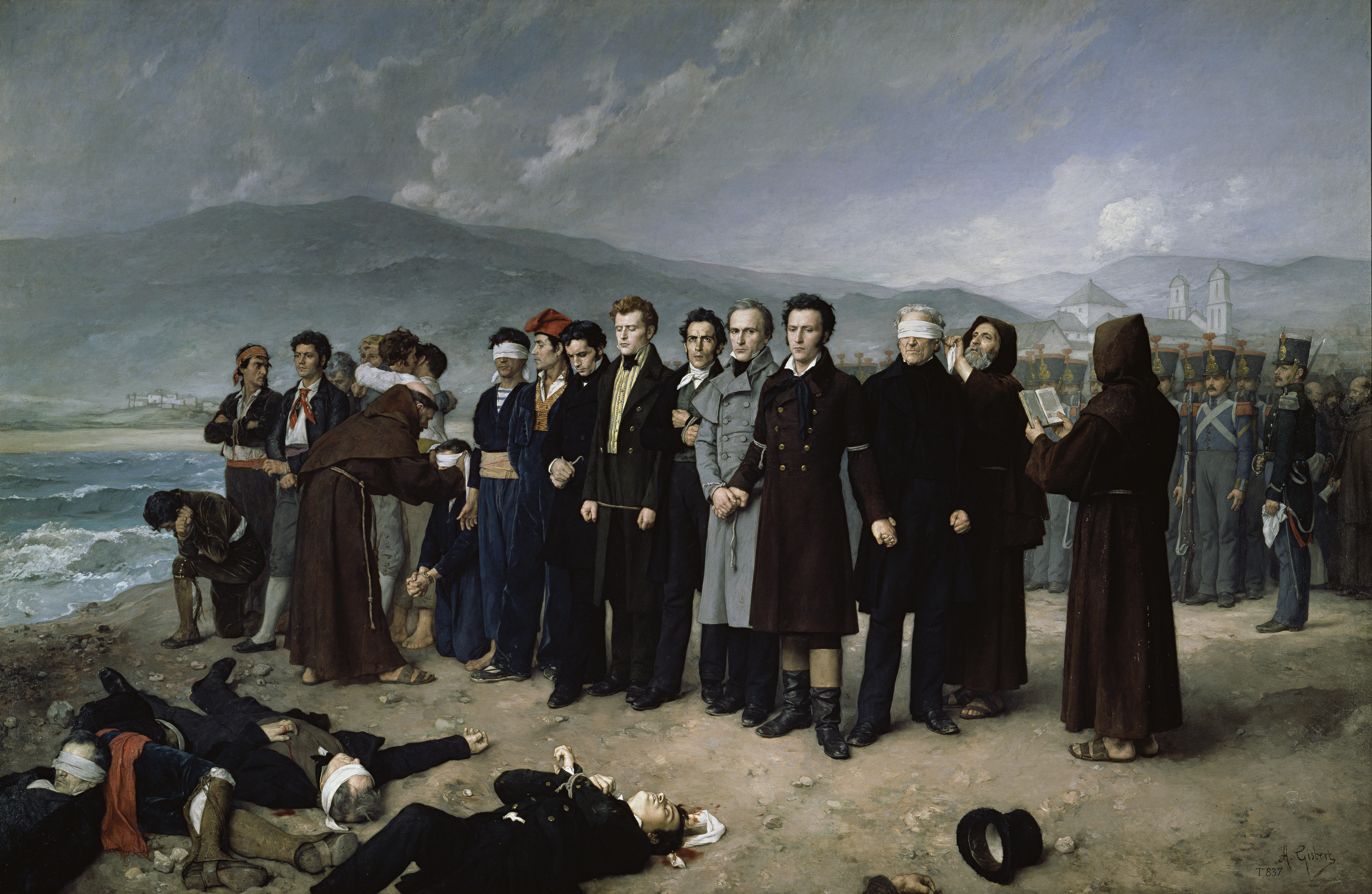
Execution of the leaders of the failed Spanish 1831 pronunciamento under General Torrijos

A pronunciamiento (Note: Spanish: [pɾonunθjaˈmjento], Portuguese: pronunciamento [pɾunũsiɐˈmẽtu]; 'pronouncement') is a form of military rebellion or coup d'état particularly associated with Spain, Portugal and Ibero-America, especially in the 19th century.

== Typology ==
The pronunciamiento is one category of praetorianism: the practice of military figures acting as political actors in their own right, rather than as the politically-neutral instrument of civilian government. In a classic coup d'état a rebel faction which controls some critical element of the armed forces seizes control of the state by a sudden movement, organized and executed in stealth. A pronunciamiento, in contrast, is by definition a public performance designed to rally public opinion to a dissident faction. A group of military officers, often mid-ranking, publicly declare their opposition to the current government (head of state and/or cabinet, who may be legally elected civilians or the result of a previous coup). Pronunciamientos are normally 'bloodless' or close to it, intending to bring about a change in government or regime by threatening violence and publicly demonstrating the lack of support for a given government, rather than the swift actual violence of a normal coup. The goal may be, as in the classic coup, to install one of the military rebels in power. But more often its aim is to tip the balance of public opinion so that a favoured prominent civilian opposition leader might be called to form a government.

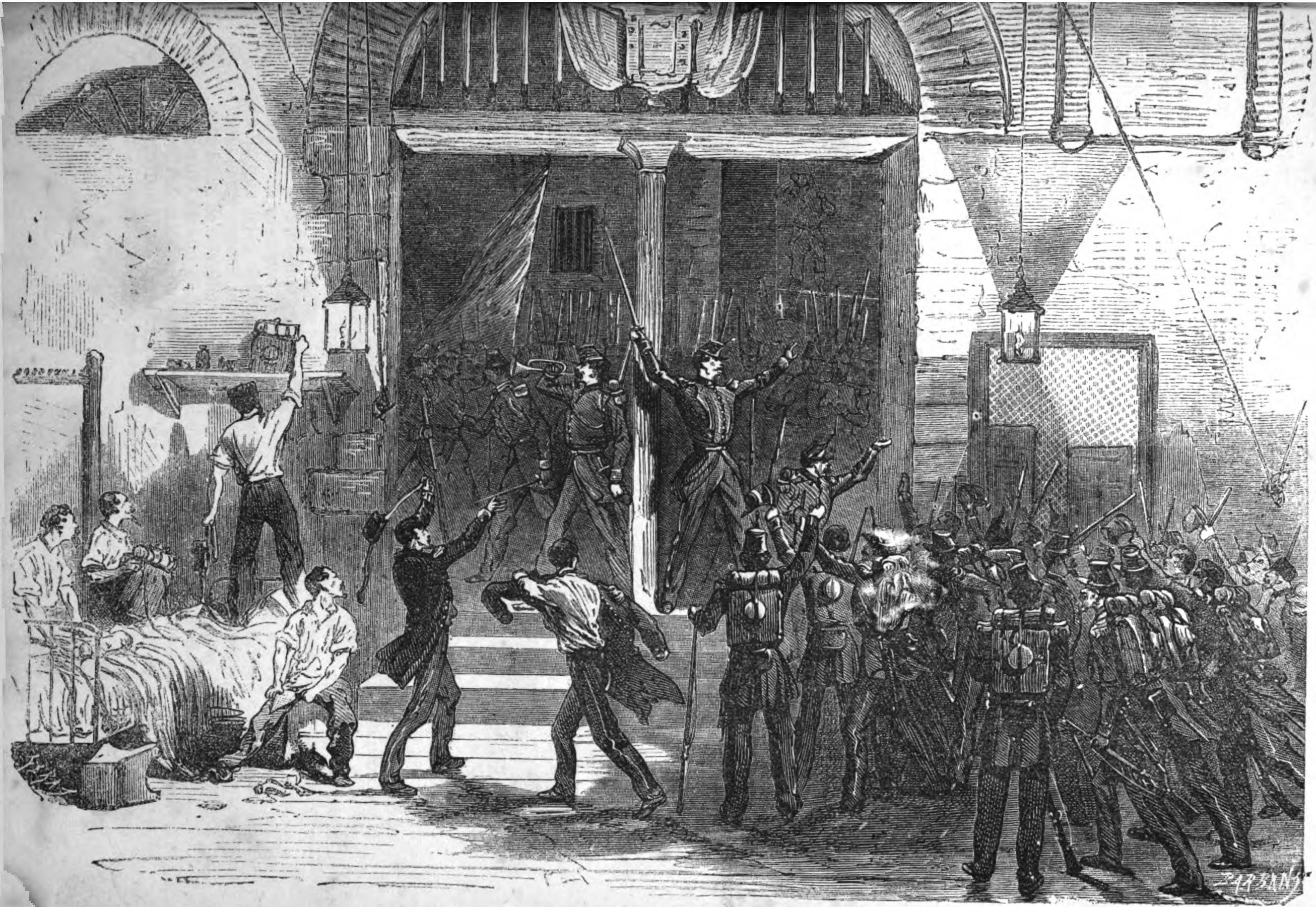
Pronunciamiento in Lisbon.

Stanley Payne characterises the pronunciamiento, in contrast to the "classic military coup", thus:

The pronunciamiento was sometimes oblique and indirect, consisting of no more than strong statements, encouragements, or threats by powerful generals intended to influence the government's policy. However, the most spectacular and important pronunciamientos were those that involved some form of force. Ordinarily, the armed pronunciamiento was a revolt by one section of the Army – sometimes a very small section – which raised the flag of rebellion in its district and hoped that its example would lead other units to rally round, or would at least break the government's nerve.

Generally, a pronunciamento originated with a small number of officers motivated by fear of the current government's persecution of political dissidents, or of its perceived inability to resist invasion or revolution. This small group would then spend a preparatory period "sounding out" the larger community of officers to determine if their views are widely shared. After the pronunciamiento the would-be rebel officers then wait for the rest of the armed forces to declare for or against the government. There is no fighting at this point; if the rebellion has no support the organizers lose. They may have to flee the country or retire from the armed forces, or they may be arrested, and typically they would face a lenient fate. If the bulk of the armed forces declare in favor of the pronunciamiento the government resigns. It is similar to a vote of no confidence, except that it is issued by the armed forces, not by the legislature.

== History ==
The origins of the pronunciamiento lie in the Spanish and Portuguese resistance to Napoleonic rule. The Napoleonic Wars created the conditions for the intervention of the military in a plebiscitary act of 'no confidence' on the presumed behalf of the nation. The wars had brought together large groups of ordinary men from all across a given state, while at the same time exposing them en masse to political ideas. Conscription to fight a foreign occupier or invader subjected individuals from different corners of the multiethnic dynastic state to similar experiences, generating a practical sense of belonging to one same 'nation'. After brief experiences of democratic government and constitutional liberties, 1814–15 saw the restoration of absolute monarchy under dynastic houses such as the Bourbons or Habsburgs. This gave rise to the sentiment that the conscript army of citizen-soldiers (see Levée en masse and Milicia Nacional) was a truer expression of the people and the nation than the monarchs themselves, paving the way for elements within the army to take politics into their own hands.

This process in Spain has been compared to the experience of France during the same period: from Bonaparte's own military-backed coup of 1799, to the participation of liberal generals Lafayette, Gérard and Mouton in the 1830 overthrow of the Bourbon Restoration. The pronunciamiento was also used under parliamentary regimes where the legislature had split into many micro-factions, rendering it impossible for the government to identify the public mood. Elements within the army might then intervene as a 'referendum' to influence parliament or government towards a desired direction.

In Spain, the principle of a segment of the military intervening in politics through a plebiscitary gesture had been generated by the national mass mobilisation of the War of Independence against Bonapartist France. Subsequently, the restoration of the absolute monarchy prompted the liberal General Riego to mount a military rising in 1820, demanding the restoration of the Constitution of 1812. For the next half-century a cycle of military interventions, both pronunciamientos and classic coup d'états, would occur whenever Spain entered a deadlocked political crisis. Intervention could come from generals associated with the Radical-democratic left (Prim), the Liberal centre-left (Espartero), the conservative-liberal centre (O'Donnell) or the Conservative-liberal right (Narváez, Martínez Campos). This particular fifty-year cycle came to a fifty-year close with the Bourbon Restoration of 1874.

== Examples ==
- The first modern pronunciamiento in Spanish history was that of Lieutenant-Colonel Rafael Riego against the absolute powers of King Ferdinand VII, in 1820.
- Another prominent pronunciamiento was the successful rebellion of September 1868 against Isabella II of Spain, by Generals Juan Prim and Francisco Serrano, initiating the Six Democratic Years and First Republic.
- The First Republic ended with the pronunciamiento of General Martínez Campos in 1874, leading to the First Bourbon Restoration.
- The unsuccessful 1932 rebellion against the Spanish Republic by José Sanjurjo (known as the Sanjurjada), was also an example. However, the Spanish coup of July 1936 that initiated the Spanish Civil War was not. Hugh Thomas writes that "Mola's plans were made clear in a circular in April. The planned rising was to be no pronunciamiento of the old style. Two branches of the plot, one civil, one military, were to be set up in all the provinces of Spain."
- In Mexico, where such declarations were often quite detailed, formal, and issued as written texts, they were given the name of plans. The most famous one was spoken, the Grito de Dolores (Cry of Dolores) of Miguel Hidalgo y Costilla in 1810, which initiated the Mexican War of Independence.Mexico experienced more than 1,500 pronunciamientos between 1821 and the Plan of Tuxtepec in 1876, when Porfirio Díaz's successful revolt against President Sebastián Lerdo de Tejada led to a consolidation of central state power that brought the practice to a virtual end.

Outside of the Hispanophone and Lusophone world, events that have been termed a "pronunciamiento" include:

- The 1815 'Flight of the Eagle', Napoleon Bonaparte's march on Paris while converting to his cause the royalist soldiers dispatched to intercept him;
- The Greek Goudi Pronunciamiento of 1909, a proclamation by the officers of the Military League that power be handed to the Liberal leader Venizelos;
- General Charles de Gaulle's Appeal of 18 June 1940, a proclamation urging military and civilian disobedience against the Vichy Regime;
- The 1961 Algiers Putsch by French generals against De Gaulle's planned decolonisation of Algeria;
- The Turkish Military Memorandums of 1971 (a proclamation by right-wing nationalist officers against the Demirel government) and 1997 (by secularist liberal officers against the Islamist Erbakan government).

== See also ==
- Caesarism
- Neo-Bonapartism
- Spanish coup of July 1936
