= José María de Torrijos y Uriarte =

Spanish general (1791–1831)

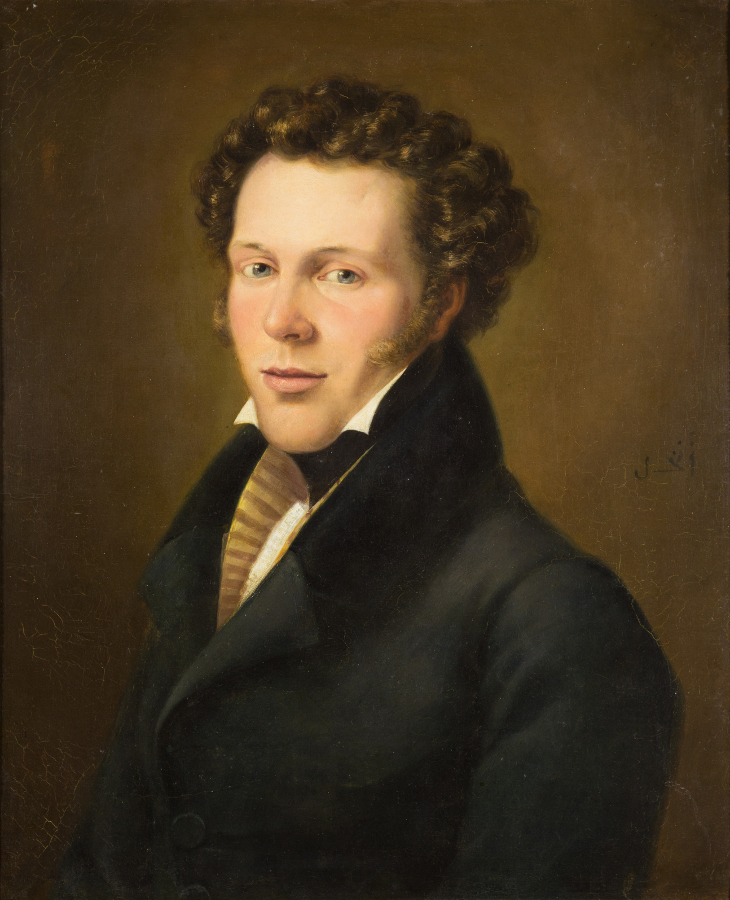
- José María Torrijos in a portrait by Ángel Saavedra
- Born: 20 March 1791; Madrid, Spain
- Died: 11 December 1831 (aged 40); Málaga, Spain
- Military career
- Allegiance: Spain
- Rank: General
- Conflicts: Spanish War of Independence
- Awards: Earl of Torrijos, posthumously Count of Torrijos {posthumously)

José María Torrijos y Uriarte (20 March 1791 – 11 December 1831), Count of Torrijos, a title granted posthumously by the Queen regent of Spain, also known as General Torrijos, was a Spanish Liberal soldier. He fought in the Spanish War of Independence, and after the restoration of absolutism by Ferdinand VII in 1814 he participated in the 1817 pronunciamiento of John Van Halen that sought to restore the Constitution of 1812, for which he spent two years in prison until he was released after the triumph of the Riego uprising in 1820. He returned to fight the French when the Hundred Thousand Sons of Saint Louis invaded Spain to restore the absolute power of Ferdinand VII, and when they triumphed, ending the Trienio Liberal, he was exiled to England.

In England, Torrijos prepared and led an expedition, landing on the coast of Málaga from Gibraltar on 2 December 1831, with sixty men accompanying him. However, they fell into the trap that had been laid for them by the absolutist authorities and were arrested. Nine days later, on 11 December, Torrijos and 48 of his fellow survivors were shot without trial on the beach of San Andres de Málaga, an event immortalised by a sonnet by José de Espronceda entitled To the death of Torrijos and his Companions, by Enrique Gil y Carrasco's A la memoria del General Torrijos, and by a well-known 1888 painting by Antonio Gisbert. "This tragic end to his life explains why he has gone down in history, quite rightly, as a great symbol of the struggle against despotism and tyranny, with the epic nobility and serenity characteristic of the romantic hero, immortalised in the famous painting [by Gisbert]." The city of Málaga erected a monument to Torrijos and his companions in the Plaza de la Merced, next to the birthplace of the painter Pablo Picasso. Beneath the monument to Torrijos in the middle of the square are the tombs of 48 of the 49 men shot; one of them, British, was buried in the English cemetery of Málaga.

== Biography ==
=== Childhood and youth ===
Torrijos was born on 20 March 1791, in Madrid to a family of Andalusian bureaucrats in the service of the monarchy. He was the third of four children born to Cristóbal de Torrijos y Chacón, of Seville, and Maria Petronila Uriarte y Borja, of El Puerto de Santa María. His paternal grandfather, Bernardo de Torrijos, was from Málaga, and belonged to the Royal Council and was prosecutor of the Royal Chancery of Granada. His father was knight of the Order of Carlos III and valet of King Carlos IV. Thanks to the position he held, José María served for ten years as the king's page. He decided on a military career and, at the age of thirteen, he entered the Academy of Engineers where he specialised in engineering.

=== War of Independence (1808–1814) ===
Torrijos' participation in the War of Independence began the same day that the war began, 2 May 1808. He came to the aid of the officers Luis Daoiz and Pedro Velarde who ran out of ammunition in the artillery park of Madrid. They sent him to negotiate with the French general Gobert but in the middle of the mission, the popular anti-French revolt erupted in the capital and so he was arrested. He was only saved from being shot by the intervention of a field helper who knew Joachim Murat. At that time he was seventeen and had the rank of captain.

He later joined the defence of Valencia, Murcia and Catalonia, being "one of the few military officers from the old army who led the national resistance in the name of the liberal principles of liberty and independence. This choice set him apart from the pro-French and collaborationist camp chosen by many Enlightenment thinkers and clearly put him at odds with absolutism." In 1810, at nineteen years old, he reached the rank of lieutenant colonel. He was taken prisoner by the French, after being wounded, but escaped and returned to fight in the war, "establishing himself as a soldier of great courage and valour". He was appreciated by the two sides – the French general Suchet offered him the chance to defect, and the British Doyle asked of the Cortes of Cadiz that he be given a distinguished command in the reorganised forces in the Island of Leon. He was under the orders of the Duke of Wellington in the decisive Battle of Vitoria, that led to the end of the war. Three months earlier, in March 1813, he had married Luisa Carlota Sáenz de Viniegra, daughter of an honorary intendant of the army, with whom he had a daughter in 1815 who died shortly after birth. Torrijos ended the war with the rank of brigadier general at only twenty-three years of age.

=== Failed plot against Ferdinand VII and prison (1817–1820) ===
After the return of Ferdinand VII and the restoration of the Absolute Monarchy in 1814, Torrijos was appointed military governor of Murcia, Cartagena and Alicante, receiving in 1816 the Great Cross of San Fernando for his military merits. But Torrijos soon became involved in the liberal conspiratorial plot that was intended to finally end the absolute power of the king and reinstate the Constitution of Cadiz. In order to do so he apparently joined the Masonry by adopting the name "Aristogiton".

The conspiracy in which he participated was led by Juan Van Halen, and was going to take place in the area under his command. He engaged in the attempt to enlist Lorraine who was in charge, with the help of his friend the Lieutenant Colonel Juan López Pinto, and contacted various clandestine liberal groups in his territory. But Torrijos was discovered and detained on 26 December 1817, first imprisoned in the Santa Barbara Castle Alicante and then in the prison of the Inquisition of Murcia. There he spent the next two years, although he did not give up conspiratorial activity thanks to his wife who visited him in jail and sent him clandestine papers, as she narrated herself, "either putting the papers inside meat bones, or in the handles of silverware or in the hem of tablecloths and napkins." For his part Van Halen escaped in 1818 from the prisons of the Holy Office.

=== The Liberal Triennium (1820–1823) ===
He left the prison thanks to the triumph of the Rafael del Riego uprising that, on 29 February 1820, led to the proclamation of the Constitution of 1812 in Murcia. King Fernando VII, after being forced to accept constitutional monarchy, tried to win Torrijos to his side and offered to transfer him to Madrid with the position of colonel of the regiment that bore his name, but Torrijos flatly refused, which led to his being sidelined from any responsibility by the "moderate" liberal governments.

He supported the patriotic societies defended by the liberals "exaltados" and was inducted in June 1820 into the famous Fontana de Oro and in the Lovers of the Constitutional Order. Torrijos and other "exalted" Liberals created a secret society known as La Comunería, whose purpose was to defend the Constitution, and which shortly before the end of Trienio was split between a "radical" sector linked to the newspaper El Zurriago and that of the "constitutional comuneros", of which Torrijos was a part.

When the royalist uprisings took place, Torrijos participated in the war against the royalist parties in Navarre and in Catalonia, where he was the lieutenant of General Francisco Espoz y Mina, which earned him promotion to Field Marshall by order of the "exalted" government of Evaristo San Miguel. Shortly thereafter, on 28 February 1823, he was appointed Minister of War but failed to take office when the king revoked the "exalted" government of which Torrijos was a part.

When the invasion of the Hundred Thousand Sons of Saint Louis sent by the Holy Alliance to restore the absolute power of King Ferdinand VII, began in May 1823, he acted under the orders of general Ballesteros. But the latter, so that Torrijos would not oppose his intended plan of not offering any resistance to the enemy, sent him to Cartagena in commande of the VIII Military District. There he defended the square along with Francisco Valdés and Juan López Pinto until a month after the government and the Cortes had capitulated to the Duke of Angoulême in September 1823, after the fall of the Trocadero fort in Cádiz (which would later give its name to a famous square in Paris). Thus Torrijos in Cartagena, along with Espoz y Mina in Barcelona, were the last military that resisted. In the act of surrender to the French troops signed on 3 November 1823. It had been a month since Ferdinand VII had restored absolutism. Torrijos ensured that officers who went into exile would receive their salaries in emigration, in accordance with their status as refugees, not as political prisoners. "He surrendered with full honours: his weapons were confiscated, but no one was executed, no prisoners were taken, and there were no reprisals. On the contrary, a few days later, on 7 November 1823, Rafael del Riego was executed in the Plaza de la Cebada in Madrid. He became the symbol of the liberals' defeat at the hands of the Holy Alliance. On 18 November Torrijos and his wife embarked for Marseille, arriving on 1 December. Thus began an exile that would irreversibly change their lives."

=== Exile in England (1824–1830) ===
He stayed only five months in France because of the hostility shown by the government to the Spanish liberal exiles, who were heavily guarded by the police and who were not allowed to reside in the border departments with Spain. At that time Torrijos claimed for himself and for his subordinates the salary stipulated in the agreement of surrender of Cartagena, but the government refused to pay. They would only get paid after the revolution of 1830 triumphed in France. He came into contact with General Lafayette, deputy and one of the main leaders of the liberal opposition to the monarchy of Louis XVIII, with whom he maintained an active correspondence which created a long friendship.

On 24 April 1824, Torrijos and his wife embarked for England, and during the first two years lived in a modest house in Blackheath until at the end of 1826 they moved to London. During that time he lived with the help of his former commander the Duke of Wellington, then British Prime Minister, which continued until July 1829 when it was withdrawn because of his increased conspiratorial activity. As this grant was not very large, he had to work as a translator. He translated the Memoirs of Napoleon from French into Castilian, preceded by an introduction – in which he showed his admiration for Bonaparte as the creator of a "national" army, among other reasons – and supplemented by numerous notes; and from English into Spanish the Memoirs of General Miller, who had participated in the Peruvian war. Torrijos had personally met General Miller in 1812 during the campaigns of the Spanish War of Independence. In the prologue of the latter Torrijos emphasised that Miller had left his land to fight for the freedom "of South America", without even knowing the language, and that "he always served the country he had adopted, doing as he should, abstracting himself from people and parties".

A few months after moving to London, the most radical Spanish liberal exiles created on February 1, 1827, a governing board for the uprising in Spain, which was presided over by Torrijos, thus becoming the top leader of this "exalted" liberal sector that had distanced itself from the more moderate positions of Francisco Espoz y Mina, until then the leader of the liberals exiled in England and who at that time was sceptical about the possibilities of success of a pronunciamiento in Spain against the absolutism of Ferdinand VII.

=== The pronouncement of 1831 ===
In May 1830 Torrijos presented his plan for the insurrection, consisting penetration "in circumference" into the Peninsula to attack the centre, Madrid, from several points. This would begin the "break", that is to say, the entry into Spain of the conspirators in London led by himself would be the signal for the uprising. On 16 July 1830, the London board was dissolved. An Executive Commission of the uprising was created, appointed on an interim basis until the nation was "freely assembled", led by Torrijos himself, as the chief military officer, and by Manuel Flores Calderón, former president of the Cortes del Trienio Liberal as the civil authority. Torrijos and his followers arrived in Gibraltar at the beginning of September via Paris and Marseilles. In Gibraltar they remained for a whole year until the end of November 1831, and from there Torrijos promoted several insurrectional conquests in February and March 1831, which were answered by a brutal repression by the absolutist government of Ferdinand VII, whose most famous victim was Mariana Pineda, who was executed in Granada on 26 May 1831.

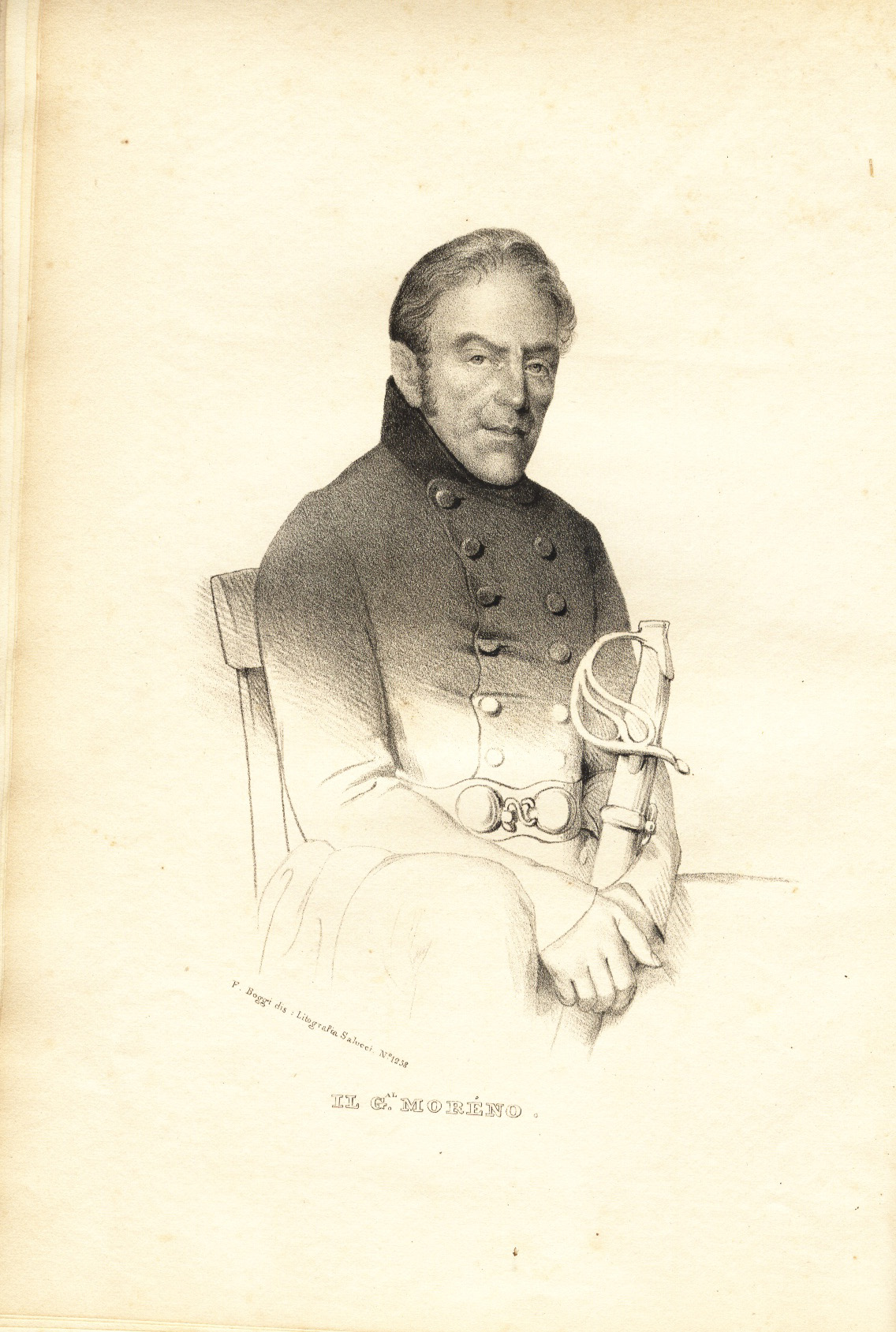
Drawing of Vicente González Moreno, Viriato, by Isidoro Magués

In September 1831 the captain general of Andalusia proposed to the government "to seize the revolutionary caudillo Torrijos by surprise or stratagem". The main protagonist of this would be the governor of Málaga, Vicente González Moreno, who starting the previous month had initiated an active correspondence with Torrijos under the pseudonym of Viriato, posing as a liberal who assured him that the best place for the landing would be the coast of Málaga, where he would have secured the support of the garrisons and where all the liberals were willing to second him."

Unfortunately Torrijos paid more attention to Viriato, and to some genuine liberals who also wrote him encouraging him, than to the Junta de Málaga which tried to dissuade him from landing on those shores if he did not have enough forces.

On 30 November, two boats with sixty men, led by Torrijos, departed from Gibraltar. This was sufficient for the project, as the landing was not of a military nature; they only intended to set foot on Spanish soil and "declare" their position, which would constitute the "break" that would unleash the liberal uprising throughout Spain. They had printed a Manifesto to the Nation, in addition to several proclamations. "As symbolic elements, uniforms, tricolor flags (red and yellow, with two blue-blue stripes) and emblems with arms of Spain. Their mottos: "Patria, Libertad e Independencia", and the cry of "Long live the freedom!"

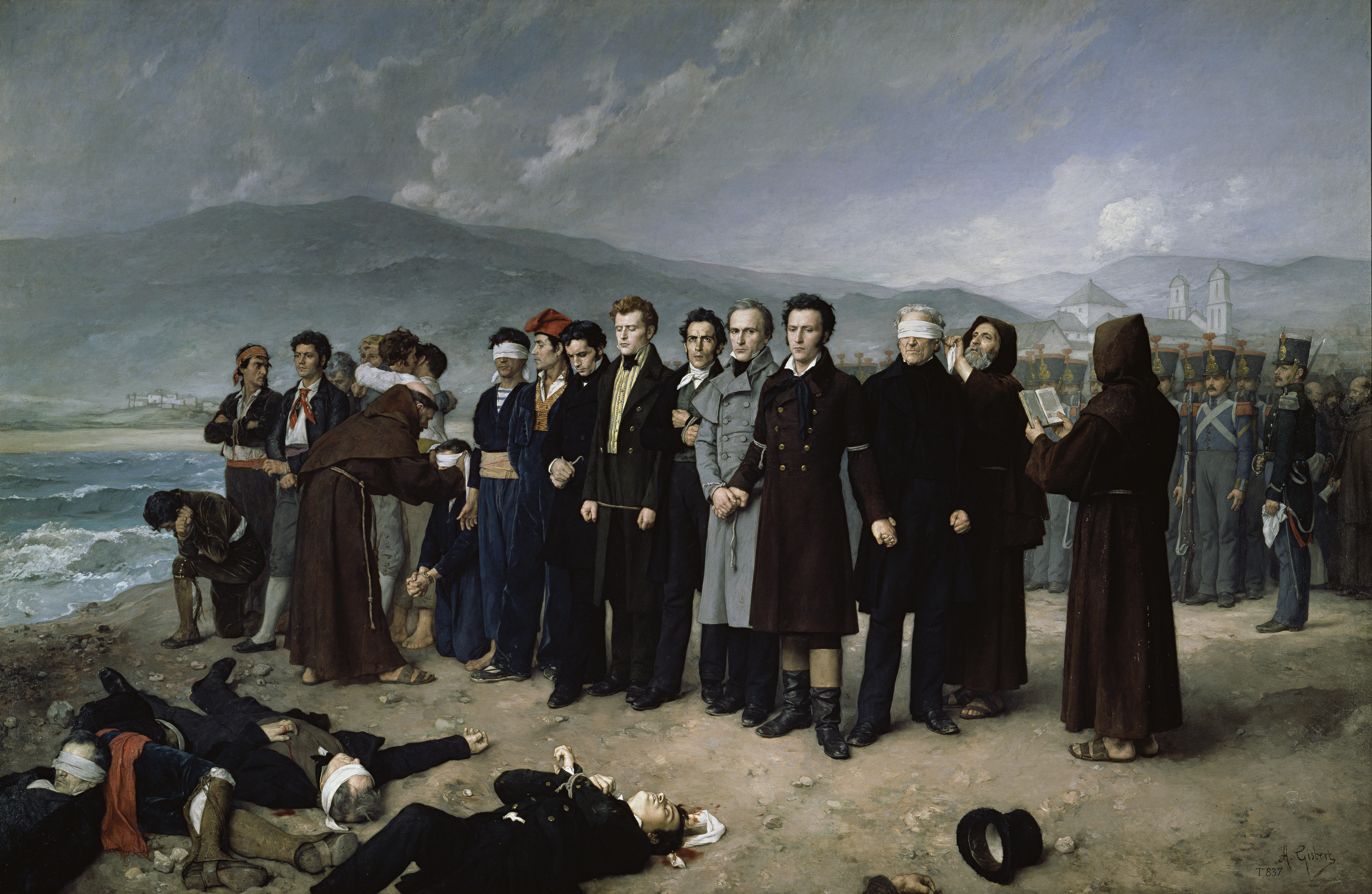
The execution of Torrijos and his companions on the beach of San Andrés (Málaga) by Antonio Gisbert Pérez (1888), Museum of the Prado

On the morning of 2 December, they saw the city of Málaga, after almost forty hours of travel. Arriving at the coast they were surprised by the ship Neptune, which opened fire on the liberals. With no more shelter than the land itself, Torrijos and his men hurried to the beach of El Charcón. Then Torrijos' group began its way towards the Sierra de Mijas. When they were near the town of Mijas, formations appeared ready to block their path and capture them, so Torrijos ordered his men to skirt around the town. After several days of walking, they descended along the north slope of the Sierra de Mijas and entered the Guadalhorce valley towards Alhaurín de la Torre, located twenty kilometres from Málaga. They took refuge in the Torre Alquería estate of the Count of Mollina in Alhaurín de la Torre. With the first light of day on 4 December 1831, royalist volunteers from Coín fired their weapons to indicate that the liberals had been located and were surrounded. Then the attack began, and the Liberals returned fire. Torrijos finally decided to surrender and hope that in Málaga the course of events had changed.

The group was taken prisoner and marched to the Convent of San Andrés, where they spent their last hours. At 11:30 in the morning on Sunday 11 December, Torrijos and his 48 companions were executed. They were shot without trial in two groups on the San Andrés beach of Málaga. "In the first one was Torrijos, who was not allowed to send for the execution squad, as he had requested." A monument honours the memory of the companions who were shot with General Torrijos.

== Bibliography ==
- Castells, Irene (2000). "José María Torrijos (1791–1831). Conspirador romántico". In Burdiel, Isabel; Pérez Ledesma, Manuel (eds.). Liberales, agitadores y conspiradores. Biografías heterodoxas del siglo XIX [Liberals, agitators, and conspirators: Heterodox biographies of the 19th century] (in Spanish). Madrid: Espasa-Calpe. ISBN 978-8423960484.
- Del Pino Chica, Enrique (2001). Campo de retama [Retama field] (in Spanish). Alhulia. ISBN 978-8495136756.
