= Walls of Segovia =

- Murallas de Segovia
- Segovia, Castile and León, Spain
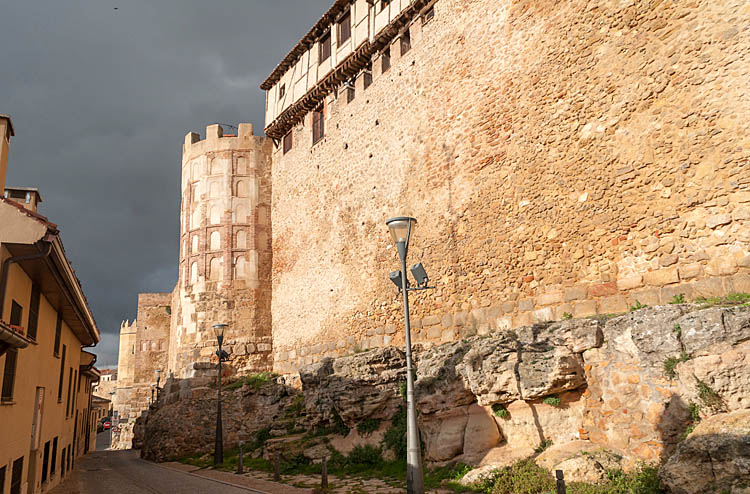
- View of the city walls

Site information
- Type: City wall
- Condition: Mostly intact

Location
- Coordinates: 40°57′4.52″N 4°7′43.64″W
- Height: 9 m (30 ft)
- Length: 2,250 m (7,380 ft)

Site history
- Built: c. 11th–12th centuries
- Built by: Kingdom of Castile
- Events

UNESCO World Heritage Site
- Type: Cultural
- Criteria: i, iii, iv
- Designated: 1985 (9th session)
- Part of: Old Town of Segovia and its Aqueduct
- Reference no.: 311
- Region: Europe and North America

The walls of Segovia (Spanish: Murallas de Segovia) are the remains of the medieval city walls surrounding Segovia in Castile and León, Spain.

The walls of the Castilian city of Segovia complete a circuit of about 2,250 metres (7,380 ft) in length, with an average height of 9 metres (30 ft) and an average thickness of 2.5 metres (8 ft 2 in). They are built out of many different materials, with some parts of great antiquity, although most date back to the 11th and 12th centuries, which major renovations in subsequent centuries. From the Alcázar to the gate of Santiago, there are two circular towers and a rectangular one. The Puerta de Santiago, which has a rectangular plan, has a horseshoe arch. The wall continues to the north of the city's historic centre, dominating the Eresma River, until it reaches the gate of San Cebrián, which has a crucifix at its entrance.

From this point the wall, raised on rock, continues in an easterly direction until the former San Juan gate. This was an ornamental arch built in the 16th century, and it was demolished in 1888 due to urban needs. The wall continues to the south and then to the west, in a section that included the Postigo del Consuelo, the Portillo de la Canaleja and the gates of San Martín, la Luna and del Sol. Continuing towards the west, one arrives at the Puerta de San Andrés, which has a square and a polygonal tower. From there the wall continues to close its perimeter at the Alcázar.

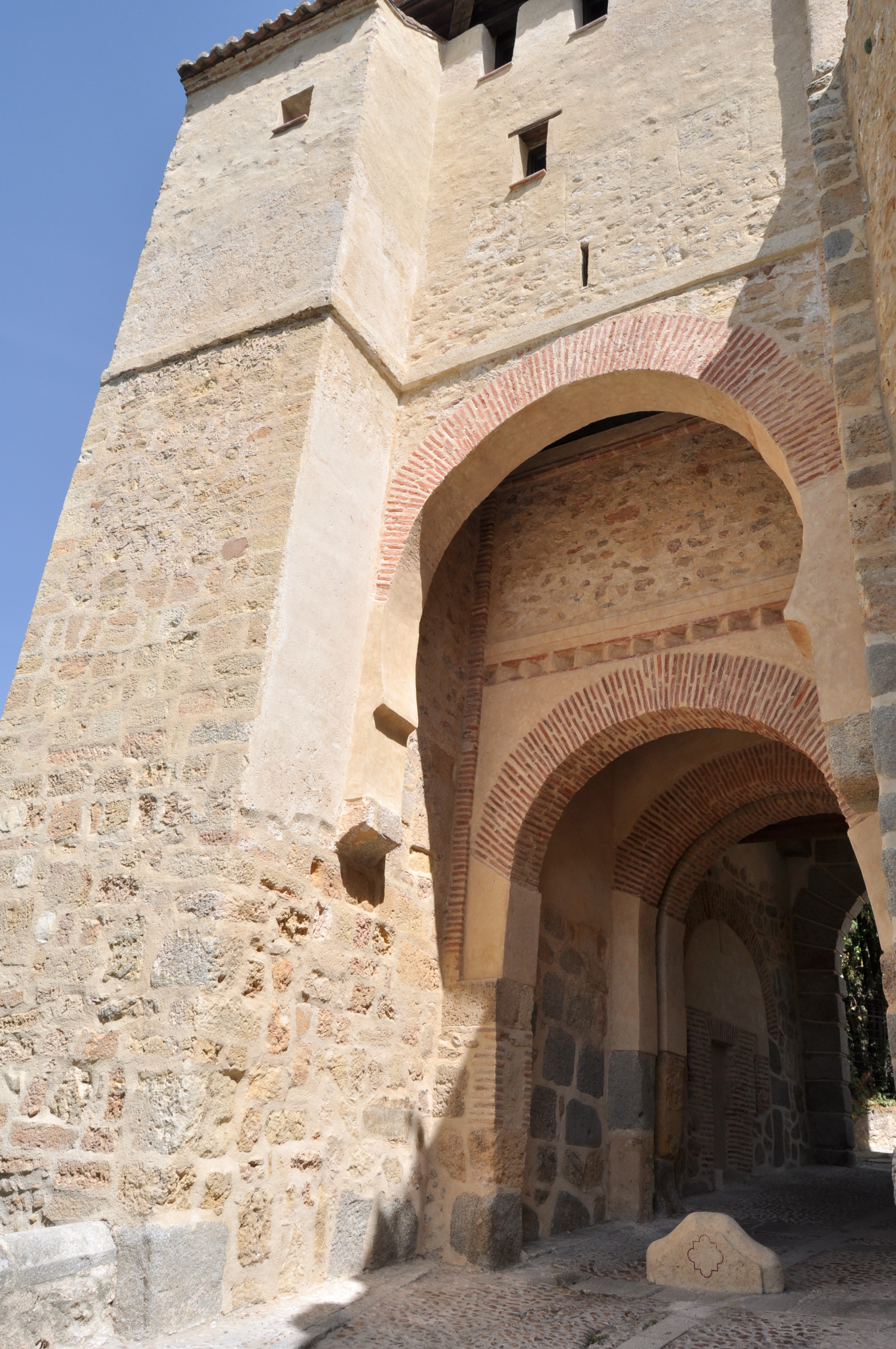
Puerta de Santiago

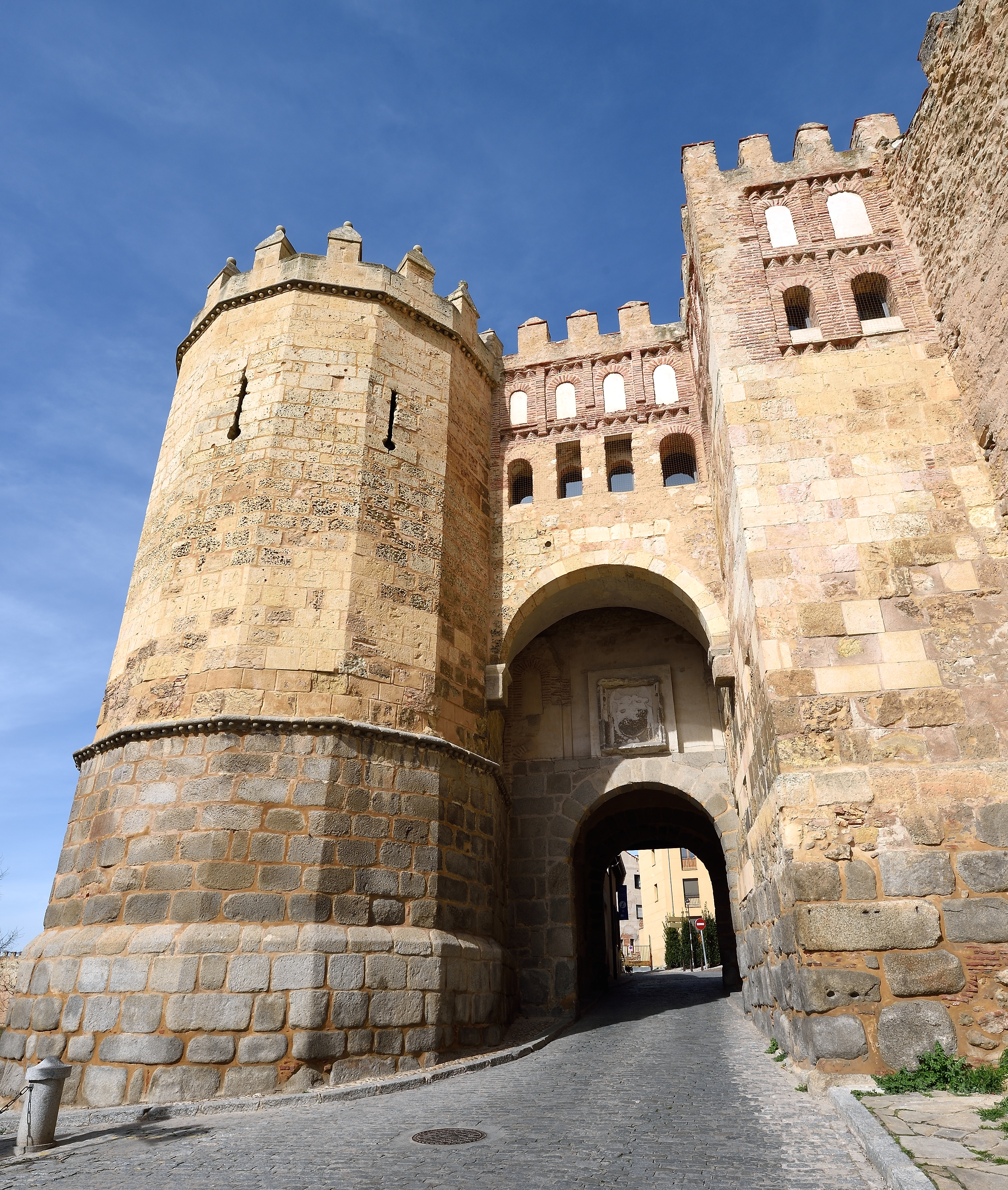
Puerta de San Andrés

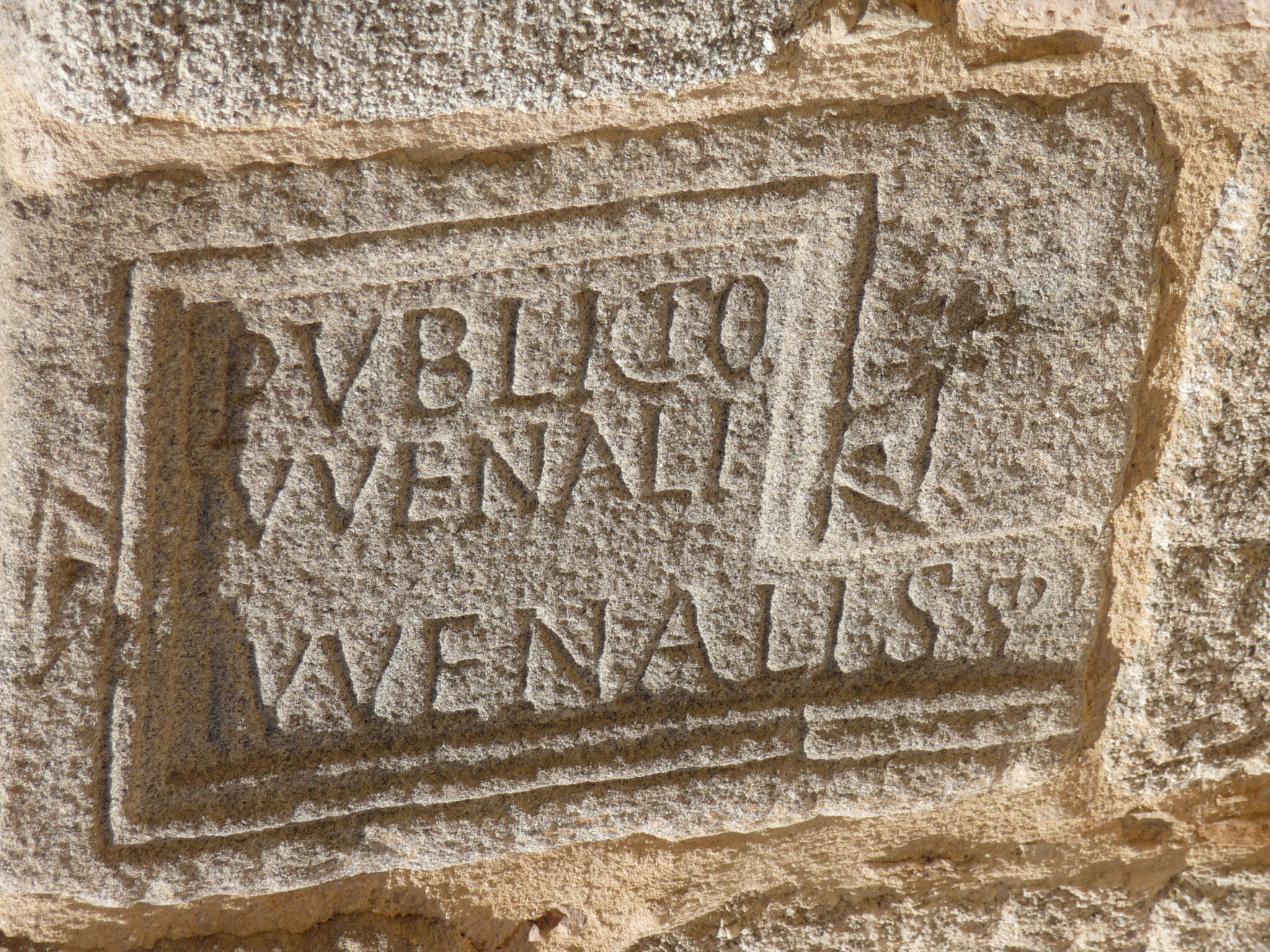
Roman inscription within a wall tower
