= Puerta de Santiago (Segovia) =

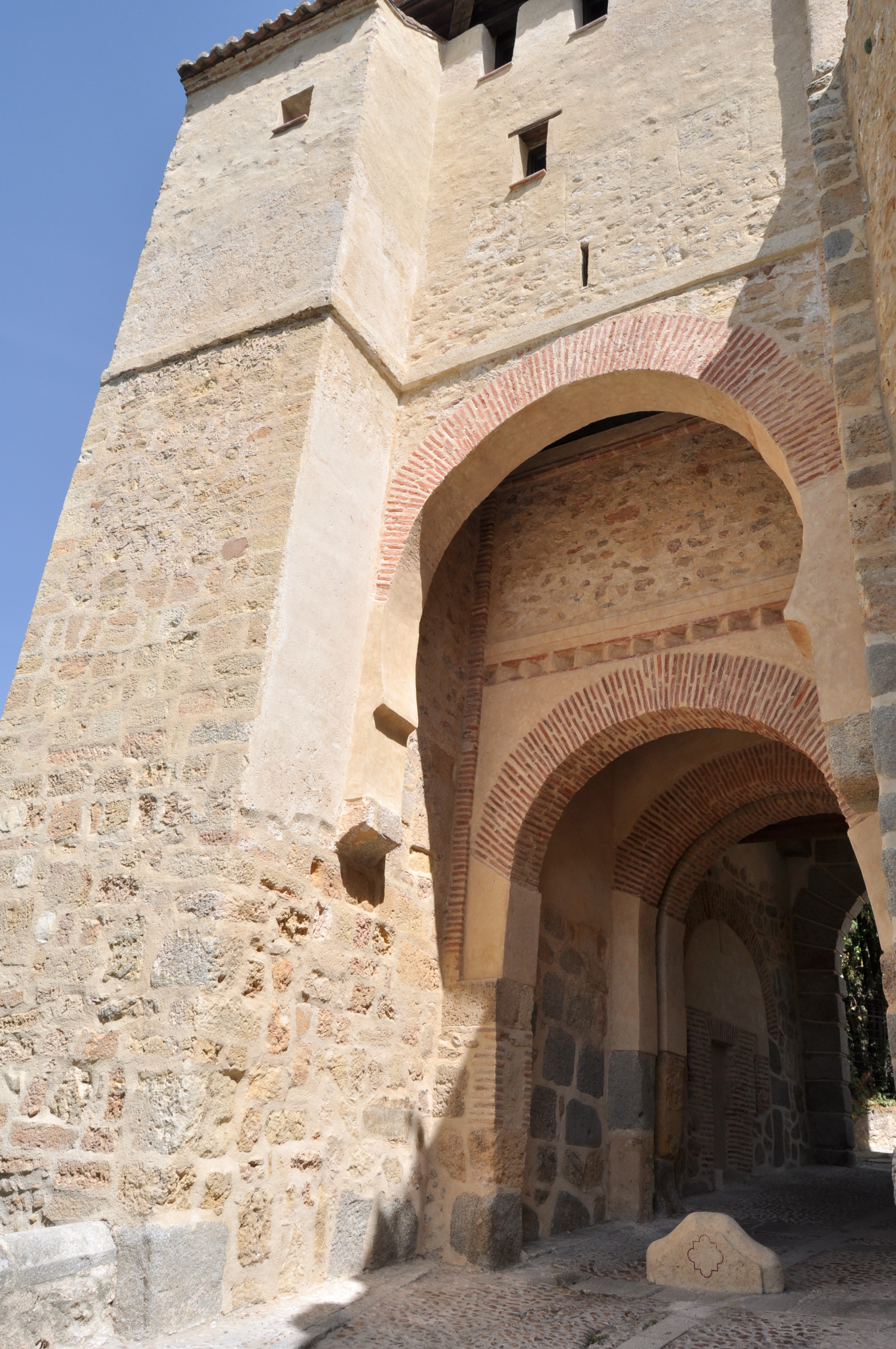
- West façade of the gate
- Interactive map of the Puerta de Santiago area

General information
- Status: Intact
- Type: City gate
- Architectural style: Mudéjar
- Location: Segovia, Castile and León, Spain
- Coordinates: 40°57′12″N 4°7′40″W
- Construction started: c. 13th century
- Completed: c. 16th–17th centuries

The Puerta de Santiago (Spanish for "Gate of Saint James") is a city gate in Segovia, Castile and León, Spain, forming part of the city's medieval fortifications.

== Description ==
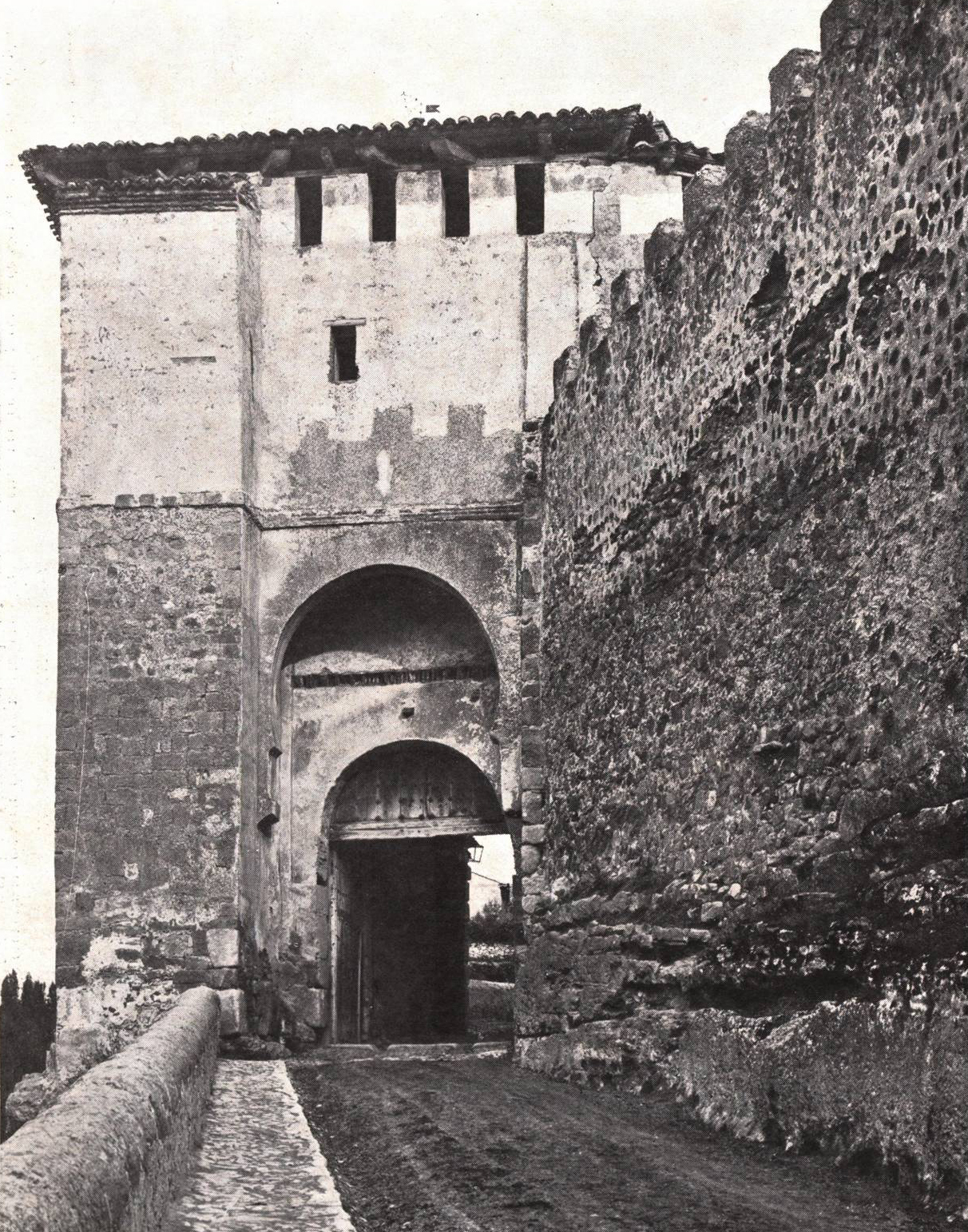
Photograph of the gate in c. 1870

The gate is located in front of the paseo de San Juan de la Cruz and it forms part of the walls of Segovia. Its name is derived from its proximity to the former church of Santiago, which was demolished in 1836. The church was located to the north of the gate, just outside the walls next to the Casa de la Moneda. Originally it was used as a shelter for beggars and travelers without resources. The gate is built in the Mudéjar style, providing a strong and solid appearance, with the lower part having rusticated ashlar. It has a characteristic horseshoe arch that opens to the neighbourhood of San Marcos. The passage within the arch contains a deteriorated statue of the Virgin of the Way.

The Puerta de Santiago is the best preserved gate in the walls of Segovia. In its current construction, successive interventions can be seen, with the west façade dating back to the 13th century and the east façade with granite ashlar blocks and the remains of a decorative frame dating back to the late 16th and early 17th centuries.

On 26 August 2012, the Tourism Area of the City of Segovia organised the first guided tours of the monument, which have since been held every Sunday. The rehabilitation was carried out by the Historical Heritage Foundation of Castile and León with the collaboration of the Ministry of Development. Its interior will house a puppet museum of the Francisco Peralta collection.
