= Jacob of Nisibis =

Syriac Christian bishop and saint (died 337/338 or 350)

Saint Jacob of Nisibis
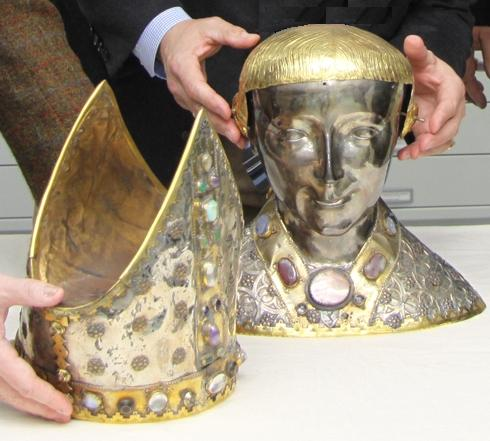
- Head reliquary of St. Jacob of Nisibis, Hildesheim

Bishop of Nisibis
- Born: Nisibis, Roman Empire (modern-day Nusaybin, Mardin, Turkey)
- Died: 337/338 or 350; Nisibis, Roman Empire (modern-day Nusaybin, Mardin, Turkey)
- Venerated in: Church of the East; Eastern Orthodox Church; Oriental Orthodox Church; Eastern Catholic Churches; Roman Catholic Church
- Major shrine: Church of Saint Jacob of Nisibis
- Feast: Friday after the First Sunday of Qaitha (Church of the East); 13 January & 31 October (Eastern Orthodox Church); 26 January (Ethiopian Orthodox); 15 July (Syriac Orthodox Church & Roman Catholic Church); 18 Tobi (Coptic Orthodox Church)

Jacob of Nisibis (Syriac: ܝܥܩܘܒ ܢܨܝܒܢܝܐ, Yaʿqôḇ Nṣîḇnāyâ; Greek: Ἅγιος Ἰάκωβος Ἐπίσκοπος Μυγδονίας; Armenian: Յակոբ Մծբնայ Yakob Mtsbnay), also known as Jacob of Mygdonia, (Note: Antiochia Mygdonia was a Seleucid colony in ancient Mesopotamia. In the classical Roman period it was known as Nisibis. Today it is the Turkish town of Nusaybin.) Jacob the Great, and James of Nisibis, was a hermit, grazer and the bishop of Nisibis until his death.

He was lauded as the "Moses of Mesopotamia", and was the spiritual father of the renowned writer and theologian Ephrem the Syrian. Jacob was present at the first ecumenical council at Nicaea, and is venerated as a saint by the Church of the East, Eastern Orthodox Church, Oriental Orthodox Church, Roman Catholic Church, and Eastern Catholic Churches.

== Biography ==
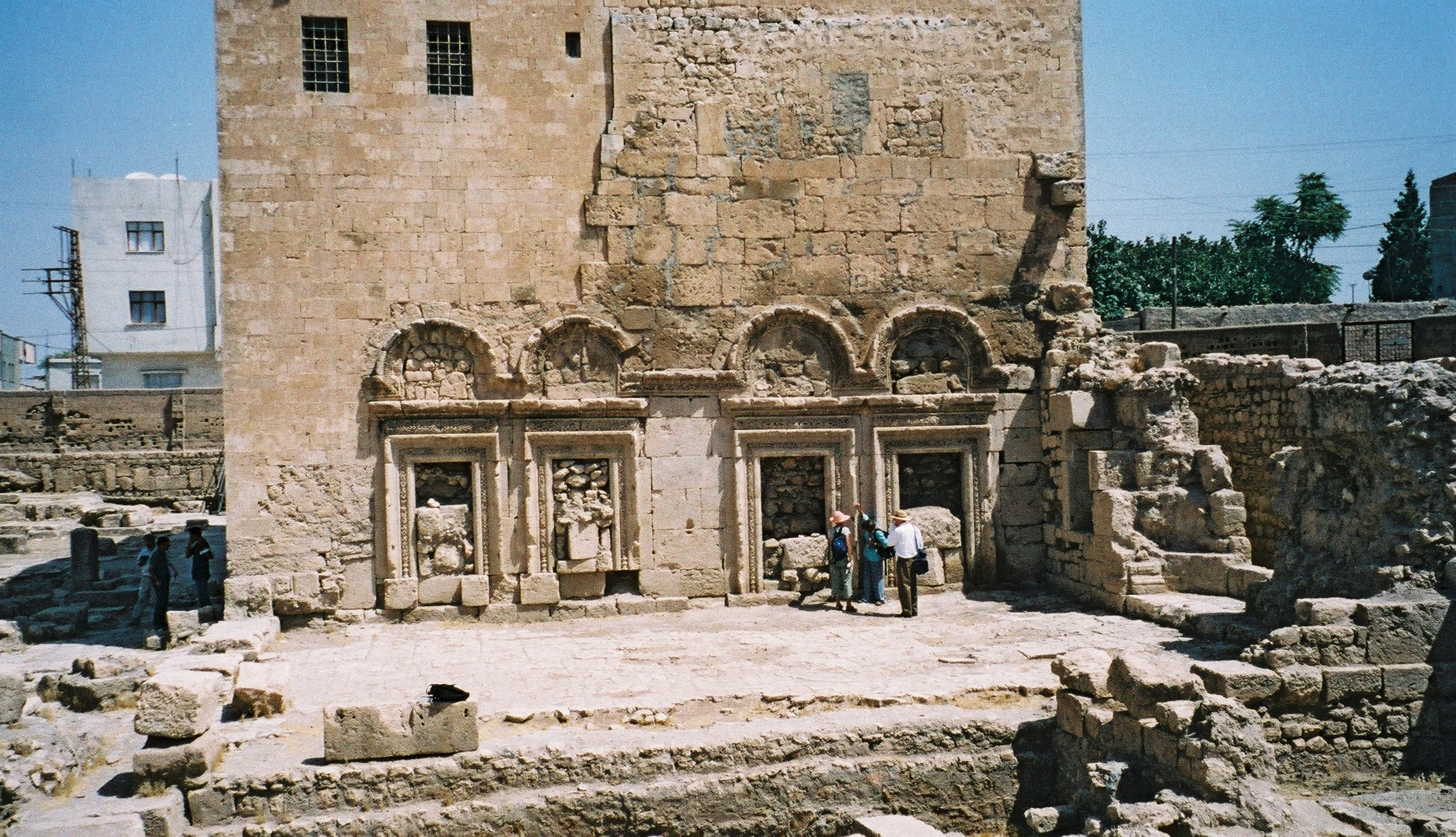
The newly excavated Church of Saint Jacob of Nisibis.

Jacob was the son of prince Gefal, and was born in the city of Nisibis in Mesopotamia in the 3rd century AD. It is claimed that he was a relative of Gregory the Illuminator. Jacob earned the title "Confessor of the Faith" for his suffering during persecution by Emperor Maximian. Jacob became an anchorite in c. 280 in the mountains near Nisibis where, according to Theodoret of Cyrrhus, he survived on herbs and fruits, and chose to wear no clothes, build shelter, or light fires for warmth. Jacob became famous, and received visits from Sheria, bishop of Arbela (r. 304–316), according to the Chronicle of Arbela.

It is stated in legend that Jacob resolved to climb Mount Qardu, traditionally believed to be the resting place of Noah's Ark, and recover a fragment of the ark upon hearing from the hermit Maroukeh that local people doubted the Great Flood. Jacob ascended the mountain and rested close to the summit; in his sleep, an angel placed a fragment of the ark close to him, and instructed him to awake. He brought the relic to the hermit Maroukeh and, according to Jacob's hagiography, a sacred spring appeared where he had rested, reputed to have healing properties.

A number of miracles are credited to Jacob by Theodoret in Historia Religiosa (Religious History), in which he had a boulder explode beside a Persian judge who had given an unjust judgement. Also, in one incident, Jacob cursed boastful, promiscuous women by a spring so that their hair became white, and the spring disappeared. The women subsequently repented, and the spring returned; however, the women's hair remained white. Additionally, a group of people attempted to deceive him whereby they asked for money to fund the burial of a man they had lain down and covered with a sheet with the illusion of death; consequently, the man died, and the people repented and thus the man was resurrected as a result of Jacob's prayers.

Disagreement exists as to the date of his consecration as bishop of Nisibis as it is argued it took place in c. 300, and he is recorded as the city's first bishop by Ephrem the Syrian. However, Jacob is credited as the successor of Babu, the first bishop of Nisibis (r. 300–309), by the Catholic Encyclopedia, who Ephrem states was in fact Jacob's successor. In his Chronography, Elijah of Nisibis states that Jacob was consecrated bishop in 308.

The Chronicle of Edessa states that he constructed the first church in Nisibis in c. 313 – c. 320. Miles, Bishop of Susa, is said to have contributed a large quantity of silk from Adiabene to the church's construction. The foundation of the School of Nisibis is also attributed to Jacob. Jacob attended the First Council of Nicaea in 325 and opposed Arius. Ephrem purportedly accompanied Jacob to the council; this, however, is considered apocryphal. Jacob attended the funeral of Metrophanes of Byzantium in 326.

Jacob was present at the siege of Nisibis by Shapur II, Shah of Iran, in 337/338, (Note: From 337-350, Shapur II attacked Nisibis on three occasions, as it was the great city of Northern Mesopotamia and the bulwark of the eastern provinces: the first Siege of Nisibis took place in 338; the second in 346; and the third in 350, lasting three months.) and according to Theodoret, with encouragement from the city's population and Ephrem, Jacob ascended the walls and prayed for the city, and cursed the besiegers. The Martyrologium Hieronymianum relates that he died on 15 July, the thirtieth day of the siege, according to the Chronicle of 724. Gennadius and Ephrem record that Jacob was buried within the walls of Nisibis. Theodoret adds that the Iranian army was afflicted by a swarm of gnats and flies summoned by Jacob, and Shapur II subsequently abandoned the siege.

Jacob is counted amongst the signatories of the Council of Antioch in 341; however, his presence at the council is unrecorded in other sources. In 350, according to the Chronicon Paschale, Jacob helped defend Nisibis against Shapur II again, and as he was wearing the imperial regalia, was confused for Emperor Constantius II. Shapur II challenged him to fight outside the city, where it was revealed he was an apparition and the Iranian army withdrew as a result.

== Relics ==
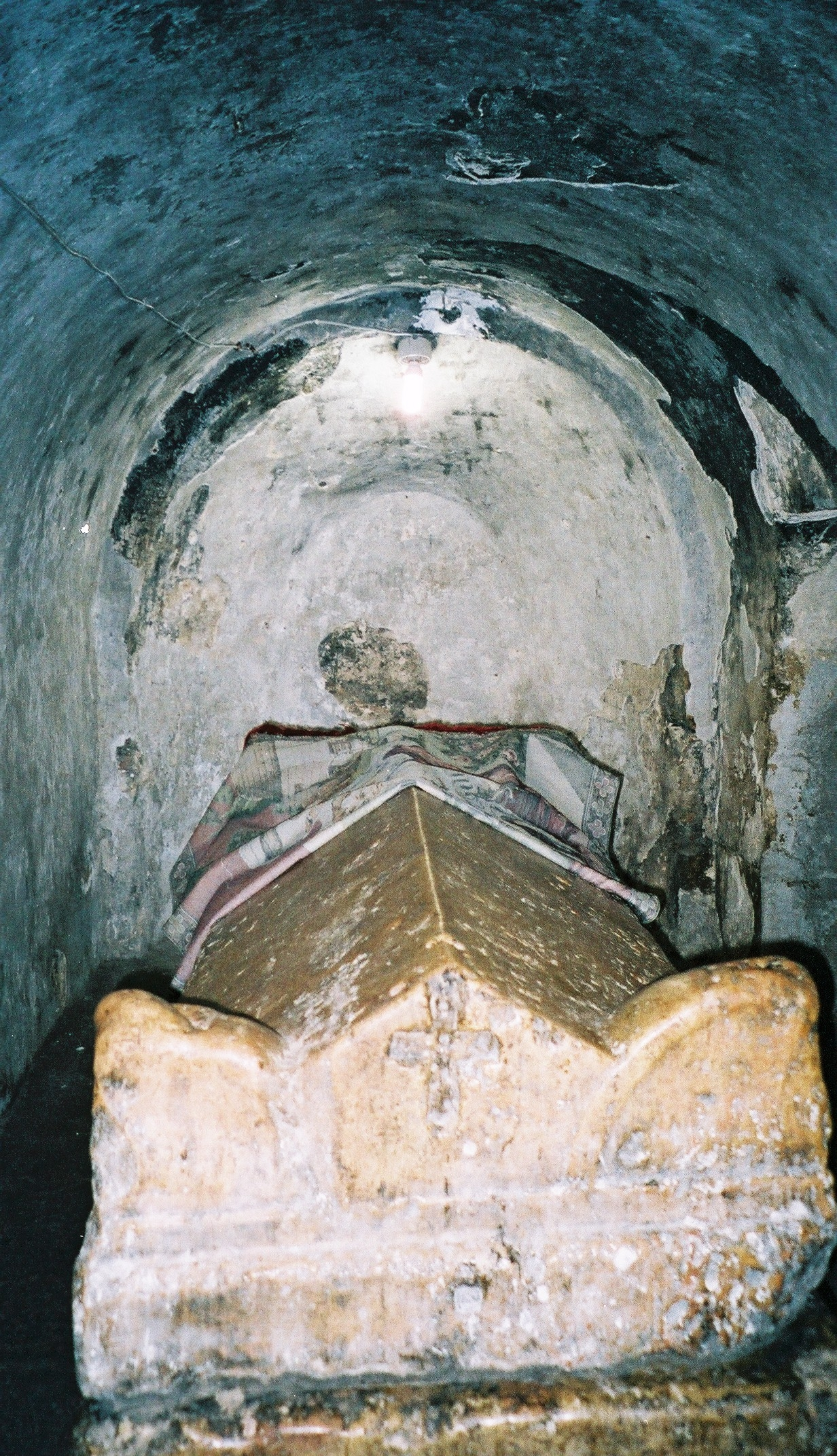
Tomb of Saint Jacob of Nisibis of Church of Saint Jacob of Nisibis

The Tomb of Saint Jacob of Nisibis located at the newly-excavated Church of Saint Jacob of Nisibis in Turkey.

The fragment of Noah's Ark discovered by Jacob was later brought to Etchmiadzin Cathedral in Armenia.

Theodoret relates that the Jacob's bones were transferred from Nisibis to Edessa following the city's cession to Iran on 22 August 363. His relics were later moved to Constantinople in 970, according to the Menologion of the Armenians at Venice.

Fragments of the Jacob's skull were donated to Hildesheim Cathedral in Germany in 1367 by Lippold von Steinberg after the Battle of Dinklar.

In 2018, his relics were brought from the Armenian Church of Saint George in Plovdiv, Bulgaria, to Canada, where they were taken to the Armenian Church of Saint Gregory the Illuminator in Montreal on 17 June, and the Armenian Church of the Holy Trinity in Toronto on 24 June.

== Works ==
Several homilies previously attributed to Jacob by Gennadius of Massilia and others are now understood to be the work of Aphraates. The misidentification arose from Aphraates' assumption of the name Jacob upon becoming bishop. Letters and canons, as well as other works, formerly attributed to Jacob are known to be written in a later period.

== Bibliography ==
- Albert, Francis X.E. (1907). "Aphraates". The Catholic Encyclopedia. New York: Robert Appleton Company.
- Brown, Peter (1971). "The Rise and Function of the Holy Man in Late Antiquity". The Journal of Roman Studies, Vol. 61. Society for the Promotion of Roman Studies. pp. 80–101.
- Bundy, David (2000). "Vision for the City: Nisibis in Ephrem's Hymns on Nicomedia". Religions of Late Antiquity in Practice. Princeton University Press. pp. 189–206.
- Bundy, David (2013). "Jacob of Nisibis". Encyclopedia of Early Christianity, ed. Everett Ferguson. Routledge. p. 602.
- Burgess, R. W. (1988). "The Dates of the First Siege of Nisibis and the Death of James of Nisibis". Byzantion, Vol. 69, No. 1. Peeters Publishers. pp. 7–17.
- Cross, Frank Leslie; Livingstone, Elizabeth A. (2005). The Oxford Dictionary of the Christian Church. Oxford University Press.
- Frend, W. H. C. (1972). "The Monks and the Survival of the East Roman Empire in the Fifth Century". Past & Present, No. 54. Oxford University Press. pp. 3–24.
- Harvey, Susan Ashbrook (2005). "Julian Saba and Early Christianity". Wilderness: Essays in Honour of Frances Young. A&C Black. pp. 120–134.
- Hinson, E. Glenn (1995). The Church Triumphant: A History of Christianity Up to 1300. Mercer University Press.
- Lightfoot, C. S. (1988). "Facts and Fiction: The Third Siege of Nisibis (A.D. 350)". Historia: Zeitschrift für Alte Geschichte, Bd. 37, H. 1. Franz Steiner Verlag. pp. 105–125.
- Mathews, Edward G. (2006). "A First Glance at the Armenian Prayers Attributed to Surb Eprem Xorin Asorwoy". Worship Traditions in Armenia and the Neighboring Christian East. St Vladimir's Seminary Press. pp. 161–175.
- Vailhé, Siméon (1911). "Nisibis". The Catholic Encyclopedia. New York: Robert Appleton Company.
- Venables, Edmund (1911). "Jacobus, bp. of Nisibis" . In Wace, Henry; Piercy, William C. (eds.). Dictionary of Christian Biography and Literature to the End of the Sixth Century (3rd ed.). London: John Murray.
- Vööbus, Arthur (1951). "The Origin of Monasticism in Mesopotamia". Church History, Vol. 20, No. 4. Cambridge University Press. pp. 27–37.
- Whitby, Michael (1998). "Deus Nobiscum: Christianity, Warfare and Morale in Late Antiquity". Bulletin of the Institute of Classical Studies. Supplement, No. 71. Wiley. pp. 191–208.
