= Puerta de San Andrés =

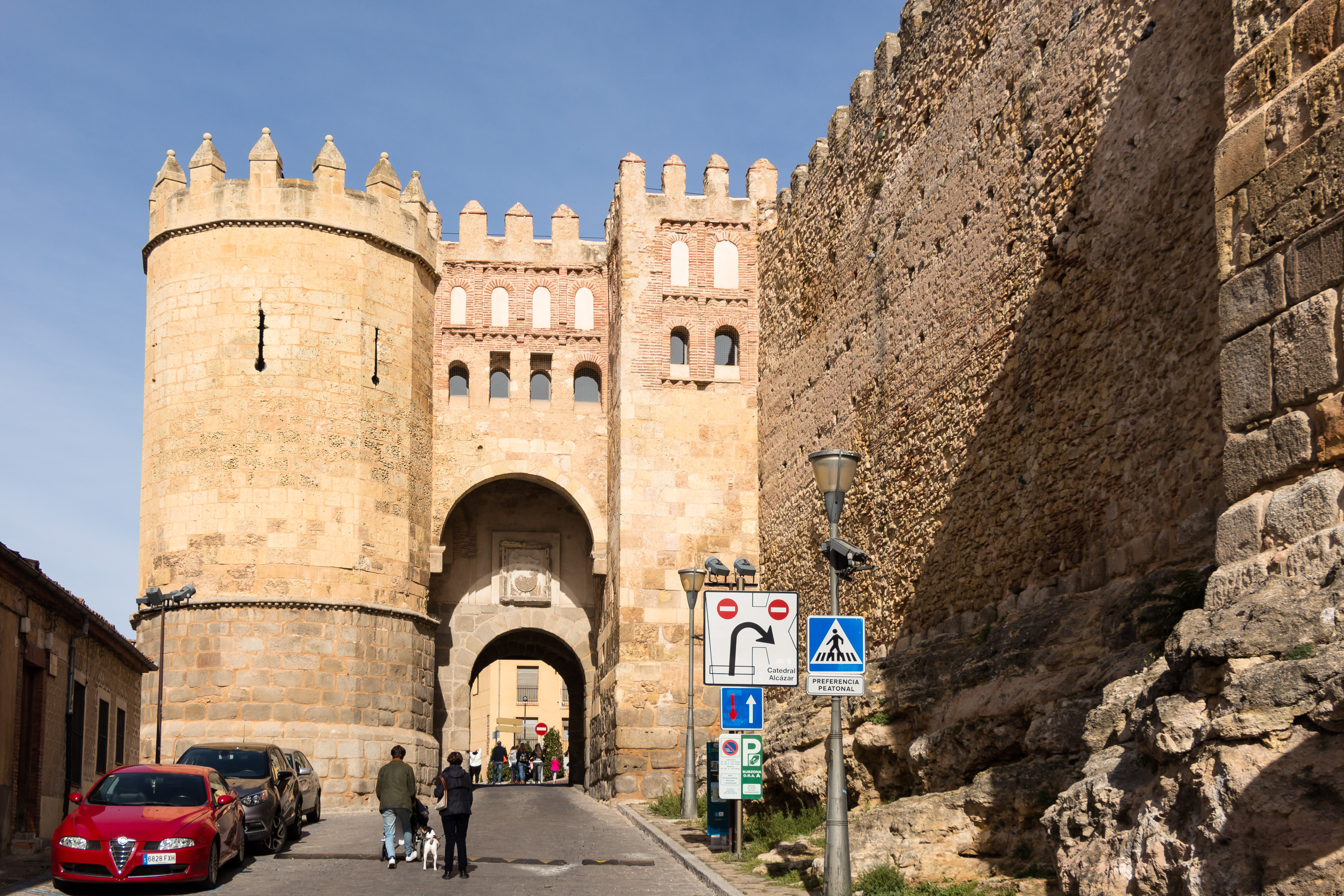
- View of the Puerta de San Andrés
- Alternative names: Puerta de la Judería; Puerta del Socorro

General information
- Status: Intact
- Type: City gate
- Location: Segovia, Castile and León, Spain
- Coordinates: 40°56′59.20″N 4°7′37.71″W
- Completed: c. 15th century

Design and construction
- Architect(s): Juan Guas (possibly)

The Puerta de San Andrés (Spanish for "Gate of Saint Andrew") is a city gate in Segovia, Castile and León, Spain, forming part of the city's medieval fortifications. It is listed as a Bien de Interés Cultural.

== Description ==
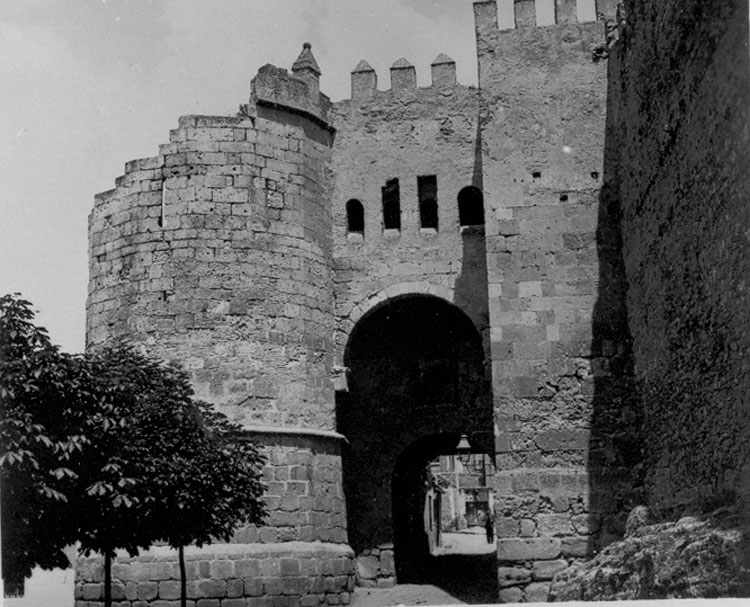
Old photograph of the gate, showing damage to one of the towers

The gateway has also been known as the Puerta de la Judería or the Puerta del Socorro, and it is located on the south side of the walls of Segovia. It has two towers, one square and one polygonal, an arch, a gallery of irregular windows, loopholes, cornices, pyramidal battlements and heraldic shields. It is located in a strategic position overlooking the Río Clamores. It has been speculated that its construction could have been carried out by the master stonemason Juan Guas.

By the end of the 19th century, the polygonal wall tower had deteriorated and part of it had collapsed, and it was still in ruins as of 1947. It was later restored back to its original appearance.

On 3 June 1931 it was declared a Monumento Histórico-Artístico, through a decree published in the Gaceta de Madrid signed by the President of the Provisional Government of the Second Spanish Republic, Niceto Alcalá-Zamora, and the Minister of Public Instruction and Fine Arts, Marcelino Domingo. It is currently classified as a Bien de Interés Cultural.
