= Zeynel Abidin Mosque Complex =

Historic religious building complex in Nusaybin, Mardin, Turkey

Zeynel Abiddin Mosque Complex (Turkish: Zeynel Abidin Camii ve Külliyesi) is a historic religious building complex in Nusaybin, Mardin Province, southeastern Turkey.

It is located in the Nusaybin district of Mardin Province at 37°04′02″N 41°12′51″E. Zeynel Abidin and his sister Sitti Zeynep are known as 13th-generation grandchildren of Muhammad, and he is not to be confused with Ali ibn Husayn al-Sajjad / Zayn al-Abidin who is known by the same name. According to an inscription, the complex was built in 1159, during the Zengid dynasty. It consists of a mosque, built in the place where the church of Santa Febronia of Nisibis, Christian martyr, a medrese (school) and tombs of both Zeynel Abidin and his sister Sitti Zeynep.

The building material of the L-plan mosque complex is rough stone. The mimbar, mihrab and the minaret are later additions. The tombs of Zeynel Abidin and Sitti Zeynep are located at the southeast of the mosque.

== World Heritage Status ==
This site, together with the nearby Mor Yakup Church, was added to the UNESCO World Heritage Tentative List on April 15, 2014, in the Cultural category.
