= Church of Saint Jacob of Nisibis =

Mar Yakov Church (Mor Yakub Church)
- Church of Saint Jacob in Nisibis
- Mor Yakup Kilisesi
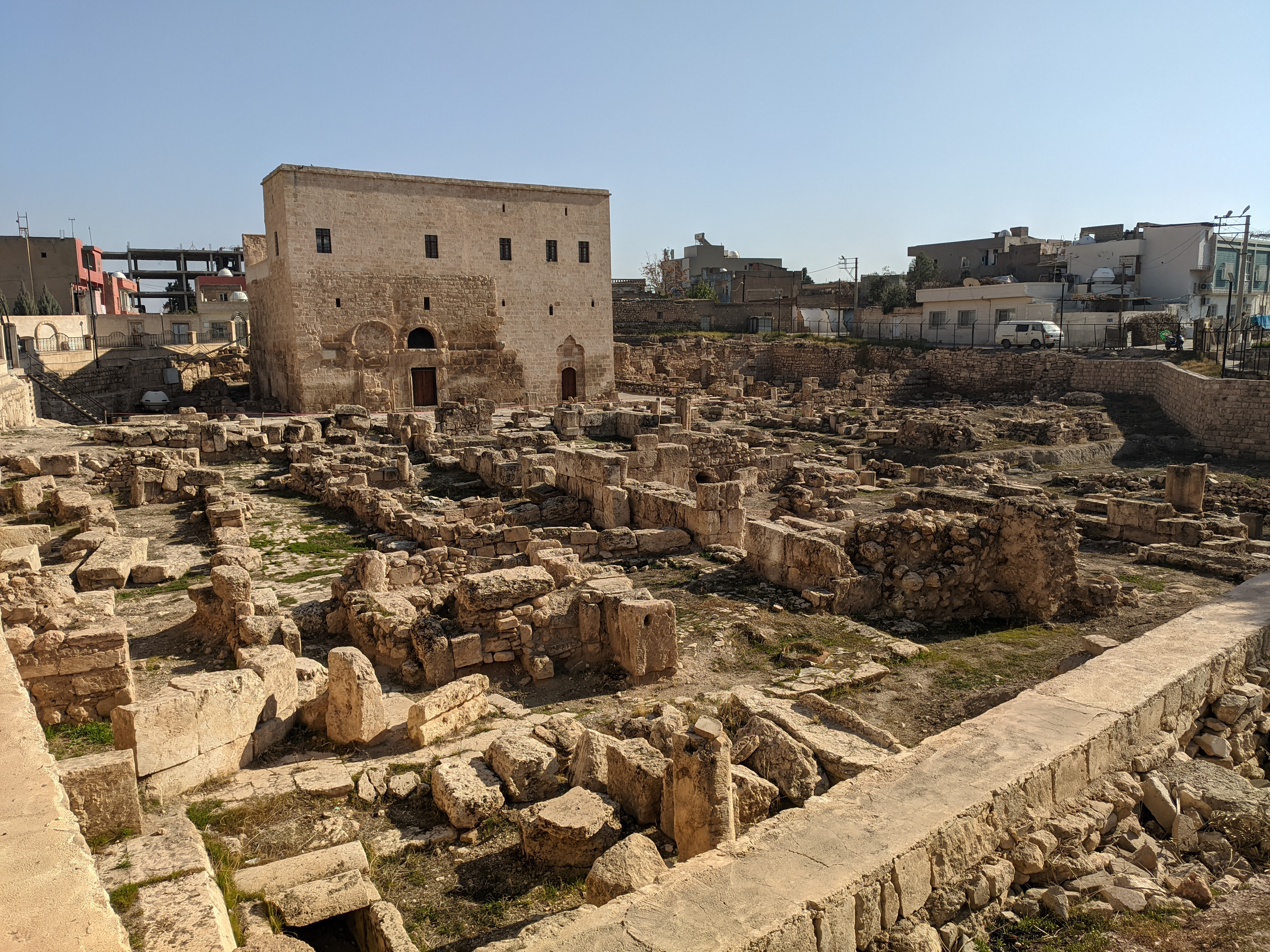
- Church of Saint Jacob and the surrounding excavation site (January 2023)

- Location of the church in Turkey.
- 37°04′01″N 41°12′55″E
- Location: Nusaybin
- Country: Turkey
- Denomination: Syriac Orthodox or, Church of the East

History
- Status: Church
- Dedication: Jacob of Nisibis

Architecture
- Style: Late Roman and Early Byzantium architecture
- Groundbreaking: 313
- Completed: 320; 1706 years ago

Administration
- District: Nusaybin
- Province: Mardin

Mar Yakov Church or Mor Yakup Church (Syriac: ܥܕܬܐ ܕܡܪܝ ܝܥܩܘܒ ܕܨܝܒܝܢ Idto d-Mor Ya'qub d-Nsibin, Turkish: Mor Yakup Kilisesi), also known as the Church of Saint Jacob in Nisibis, is a historic church in Nusaybin, southeastern Turkey. Archaeological excavations revealed that the 4th-century church building was originally the baptistery of a cathedral, which no longer exists. It is not determined whether this church belonged to Syriac Orthodox Church or the Church of the East, but it is under the jurisdiction of the Syriac Orthodox Church which it is most likely linked to.

== History ==
The historical church is located in Nusaybin ilçe (district), formerly Nisibis, either of the Mardin Province of the Syriac Orthodox Church or the Nisibis province of the Church of the East, in southeastern Turkey. It is situated around 100 m (330 ft) east of the Zeynel Abidin Mosque Complex. The church is dedicated to Syriac Jacob of Nisibis, who became bishop of Nisibis by appointment of the Episcopal congress, convened in Virgin Mary Church of Diyarbakır in 309, and was later venerated saint (Turkish: Mor Yakup). The church was built by Jacob of Nisibis between 313–320. It is one of the oldest churches in Upper Mesopotamia.

According to some inscriptions and texts, the church was built as the baptistery of a cathedral at that place. However, it was converted to a church after the cathedral and some other buildings were ruined.

The church was destroyed, its treasures pillaged and its library, which contained around 1,000 volumes, was also ruined by Nur al-Din Zengi in 1171.

== Architecture ==
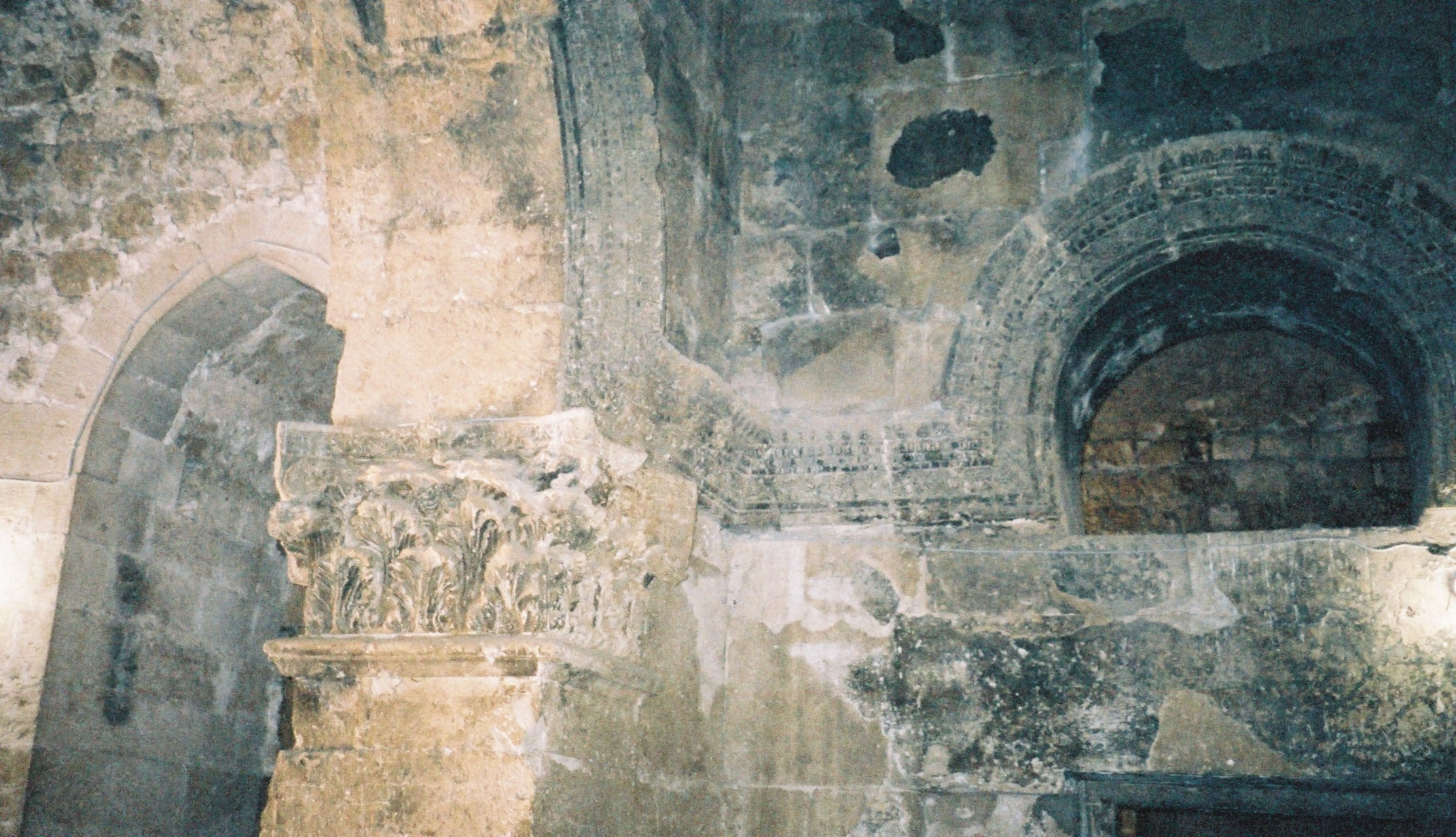
A view from the interior of the Church of Saint Jacob

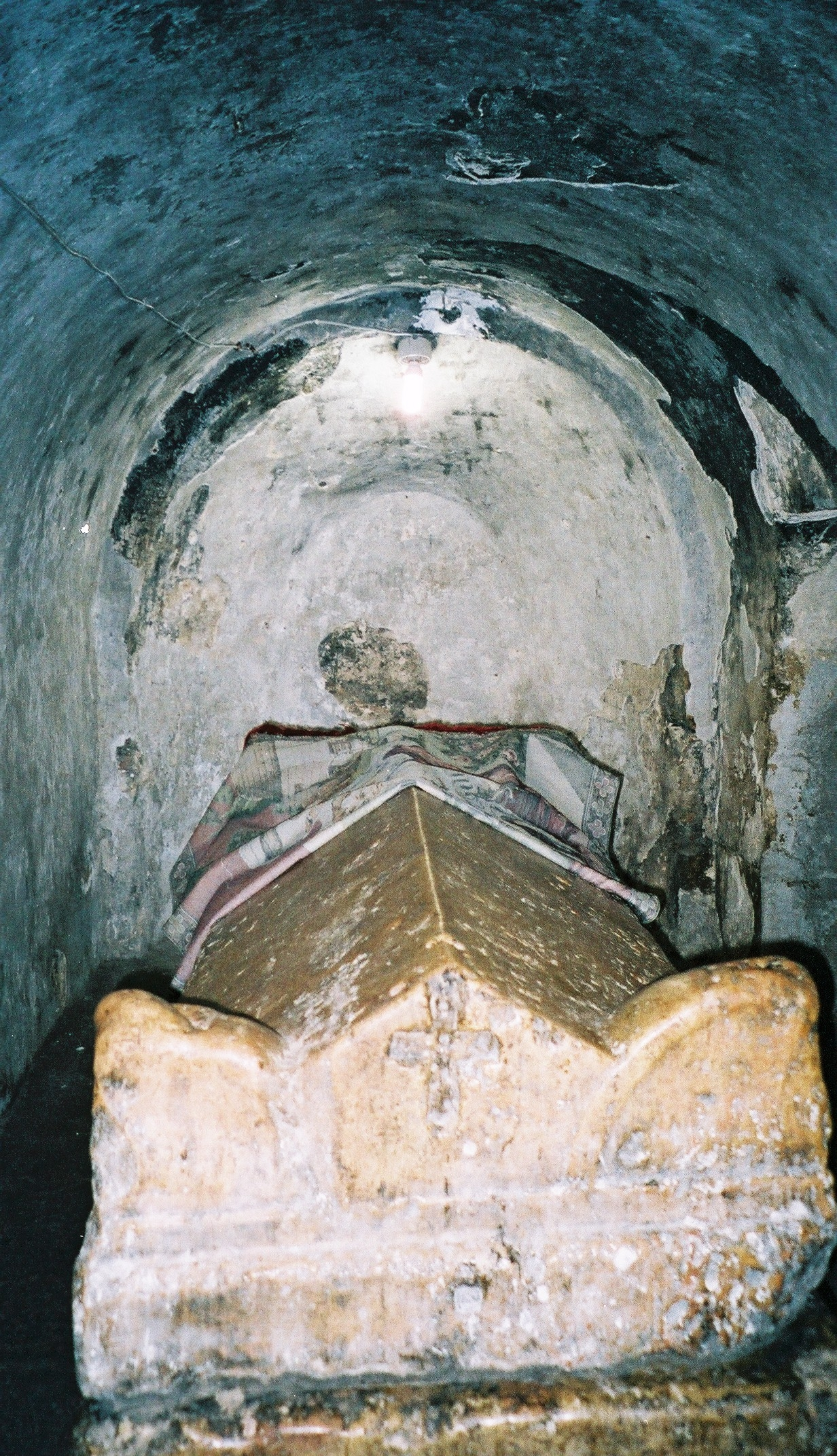
Tomb of Saint Jacob of Nisibis

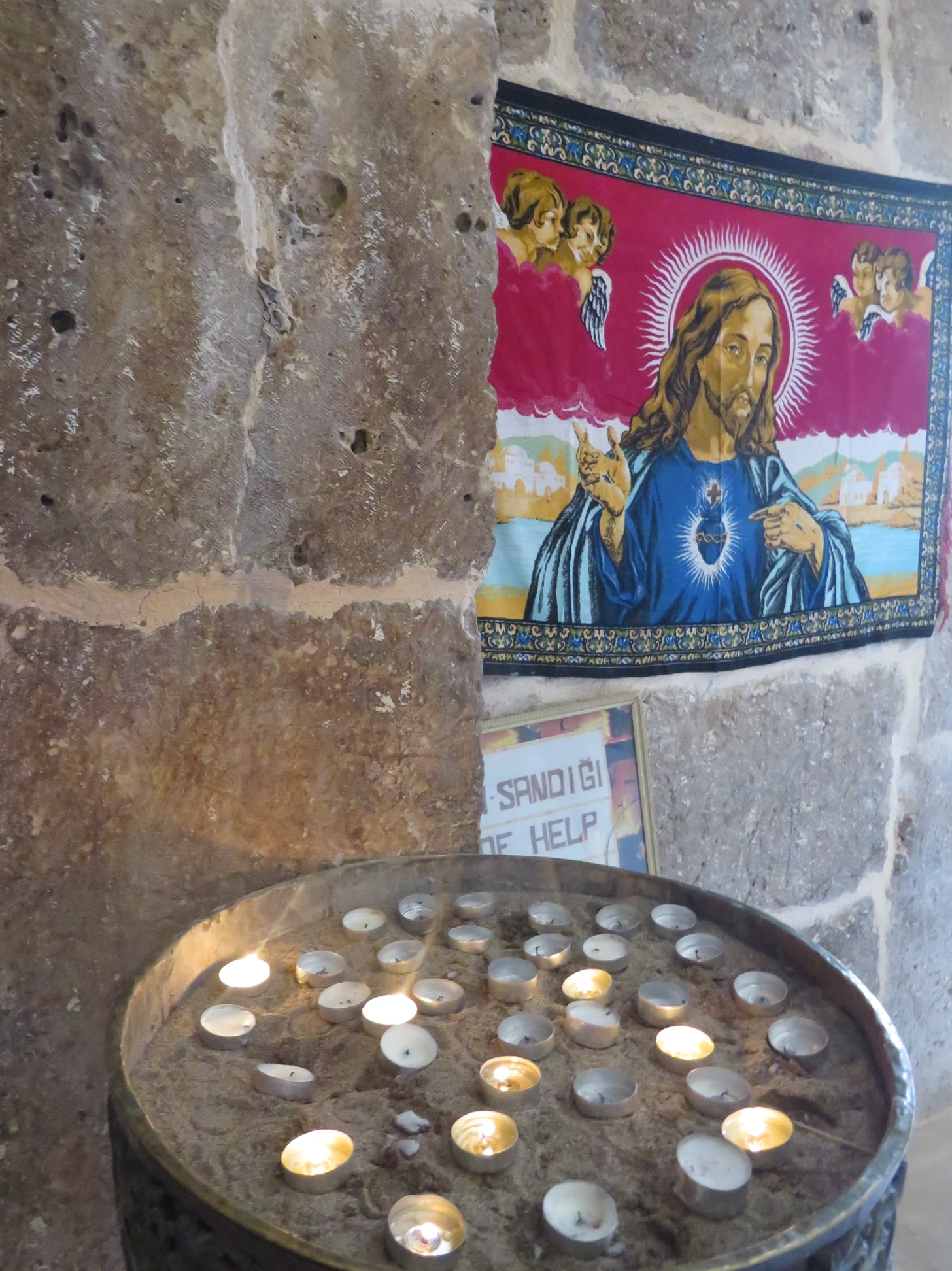
Church of Saint Jacob of Nisibis

The church building features the characteristics of Late Roman and Early Byzantium architecture. It consists of two sections.

In the southern building, there are two separate parts with two opposed buttresses. A square place of 7 m × 7 m (23 ft × 23 ft) with two doorways in the northern and southern walls is situated in the eastern part. Its eastern wall has an apse. On the west side, an arch opening leads to the western part of the southern section. The eastern part features wall decorations and friezes on the arches and apse's niche. Corinthian helmets decorate all the buttresses except those facing west. It is likely that the middle and western buttresses were added later. The western part of the building has arched doors decorated with fine ornaments on the northern and southern walls. Eight of the doors in the northern and southern walls have horseshoe-like arches. The arches and the pillars are decorated with ornaments. An inscription in Ancient Greek found on the middle frieze reads: "This baptistery was built with the contribution of priest Akepsyma in 571 (359/360) when Volagesus was metropolitan. Let them be remembered before God". A dome, dated back to 1872 according to an inscription of it, covers the eastern square room. A chamber was added on the western side the same year. Beneath the eastern square room's floor, there is crypt containing a sarcophagus, which is believed to belong to Mor Yakup.

The northern section of the building was constructed by using the north wall of the southern section. The construction method of the buttresses in this section, which is also observed in many church buildings in Tur Abdin in the same region, indicates that this part was built in the 8th century. It has the dimensions 7 m × 9.5 m (23 ft × 31 ft).

A third nave is situated on a mosaic-covered platform in front of the southern section.

== Excavation and restoration ==
A project for the restoration of the church building started in 2000. It was carried out by ÇEKÜL, the cultural heritage foundation, in collaboration with the Municipality of Nusaybin and the Ministry of Culture and Tourism.

Excavation works were carried out in the area between the church and the mosque as well as in the churchyard. After the removal of some 0.30–0.50 m (1 ft 0 in – 1 ft 8 in)-deep dirt, column pedestals were unearthed, and placed on a ground of fine-cut limestone. A masonry well of 1.50 m (4 ft 11 in) depth still containing water has three different superimposed well tops, most likely due to the rising of the ground level with the dirt during all the years before. In the eastern section of the northern yard, a stone-covered platform is situated reachable by three stairs. A sarcophagus with acroterion was discovered under the platform. The eastern yard is covered with trees. Graves spreading the entire area were found in the western yard after the removal of nearly 7 m (23 ft)-thick dirt. The graves were dug in the east-west direction and were built in rubble masonry or spolia. The skeletons are found laying on the back, arms crossed on the chest and heads turned facing east. In particular, children's graves and items were found such as glass bracelets, and necklaces made of various beads and trims. Graves with late-period characteristics reveal the Christian burial customs of Assyrian people.

Seven residences, which were illegally built in the area between the church and the mosque, were dispossessed by the Ministry of Culture and Tourism and demolished when it appeared in 2007 and 2008 that annex buildings of the church were reaching out towards the mosque. The foundation of the nonexistent Nisibis Cathedral, which was one of the biggest church buildings in the Middle East, and architectural structures of the Artuqids era (1101–1409) were unearthed. Excavations continued until 2014 in an area of 5,000 m^{2} (54,000 sq ft). Thousands of ceramic, metal, glass, and stone artifacts unearthed during the 15-year-long excavations were included in the findings of 2017 and were analyzed and registered by a group of archeologists, art historians, and conservator-restorers of the Mardin Museum.

== World Heritage Site status ==
The church site, together with the nearby Zeynel Abidin Mosque Complex was added to the UNESCO World Heritage Site Tentative List on April 15, 2014, in the Cultural category.
