= Horseshoe arch =

Emblematic arch common in Moorish architecture

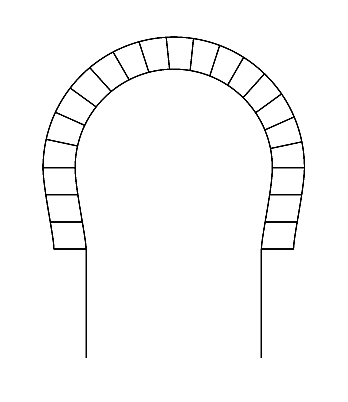
Horseshoe arch

The horseshoe arch (Arabic: قوس حدوة الحصان; Spanish: arco de herradura), also called the Moorish arch and the keyhole arch, is a type of arch in which the circular curve is continued below the horizontal line of its diameter, so that the opening at the bottom of the arch is narrower than the arch's full span. Evidence for the earliest uses of this form are found in Late Antique and Sasanian architecture, and it was then used in Spain by the Visigoths. But in the 19th century, perhaps when these earlier uses had not been realized, it became emblematic of Islamic architecture, especially Moorish architecture and Mozarabic art in Iberia. It also made later appearances in Moorish Revival and Art Nouveau styles. Horseshoe arches can take rounded, pointed or lobed form.

== History ==
=== Origins and early uses ===
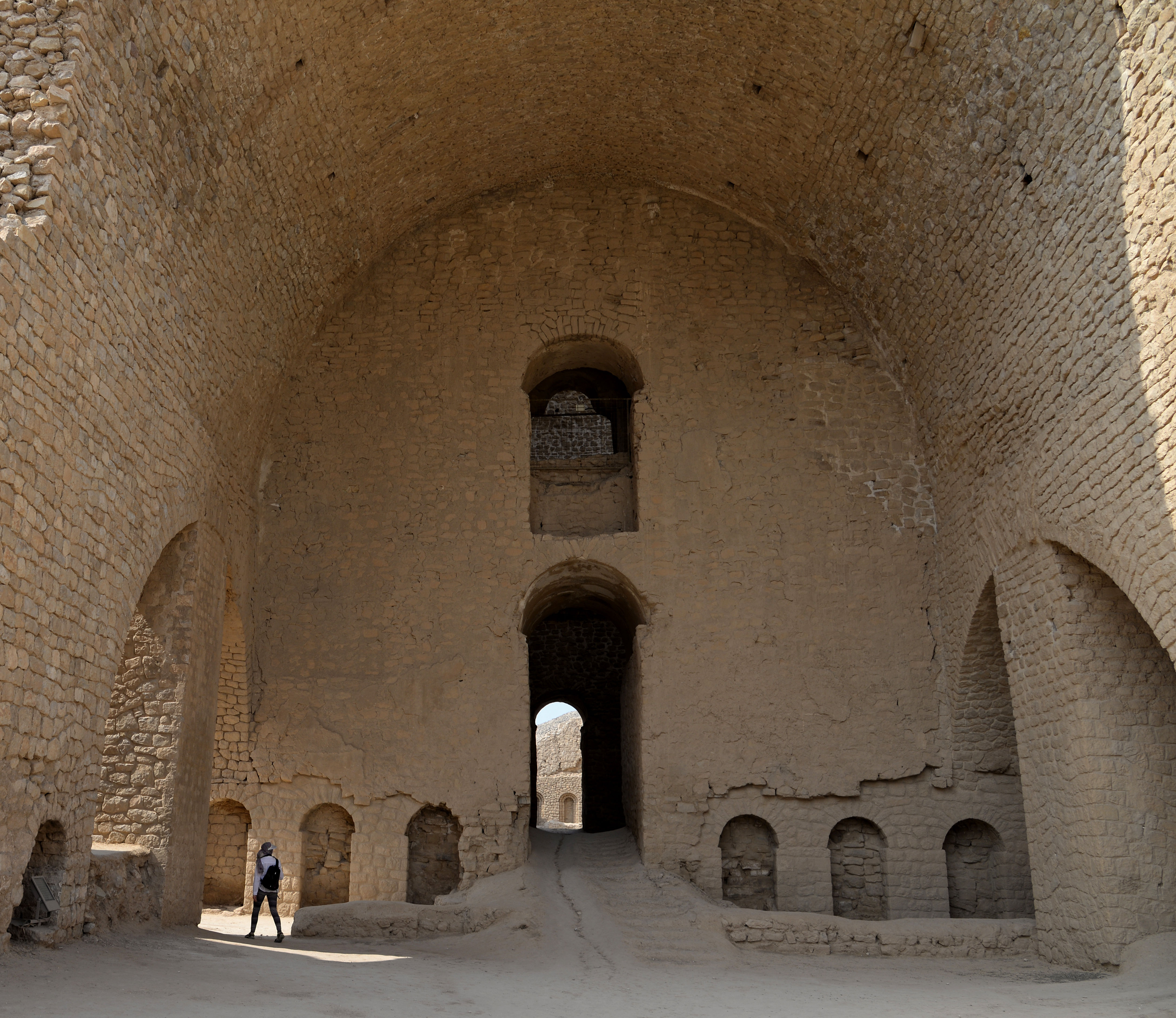
Horseshoe arches in the Palace of Ardashir (3rd century CE), in which the springers of the arches are set back

The origins of the horseshoe arch are complicated. It appeared in pre-Islamic Sasanian architecture such as the Taq-i Kasra in present-day Iraq and the Palace of Ardashir in southwestern Iran (3rd century CE). It also appeared in Late Roman or Byzantine architecture, as well as in Roman Spain. In Byzantine Syria, the form was used in the Baptistery of Saint Jacob at Nusaybin (4th century CE) and in Qasr Ibn Wardan (564 CE).

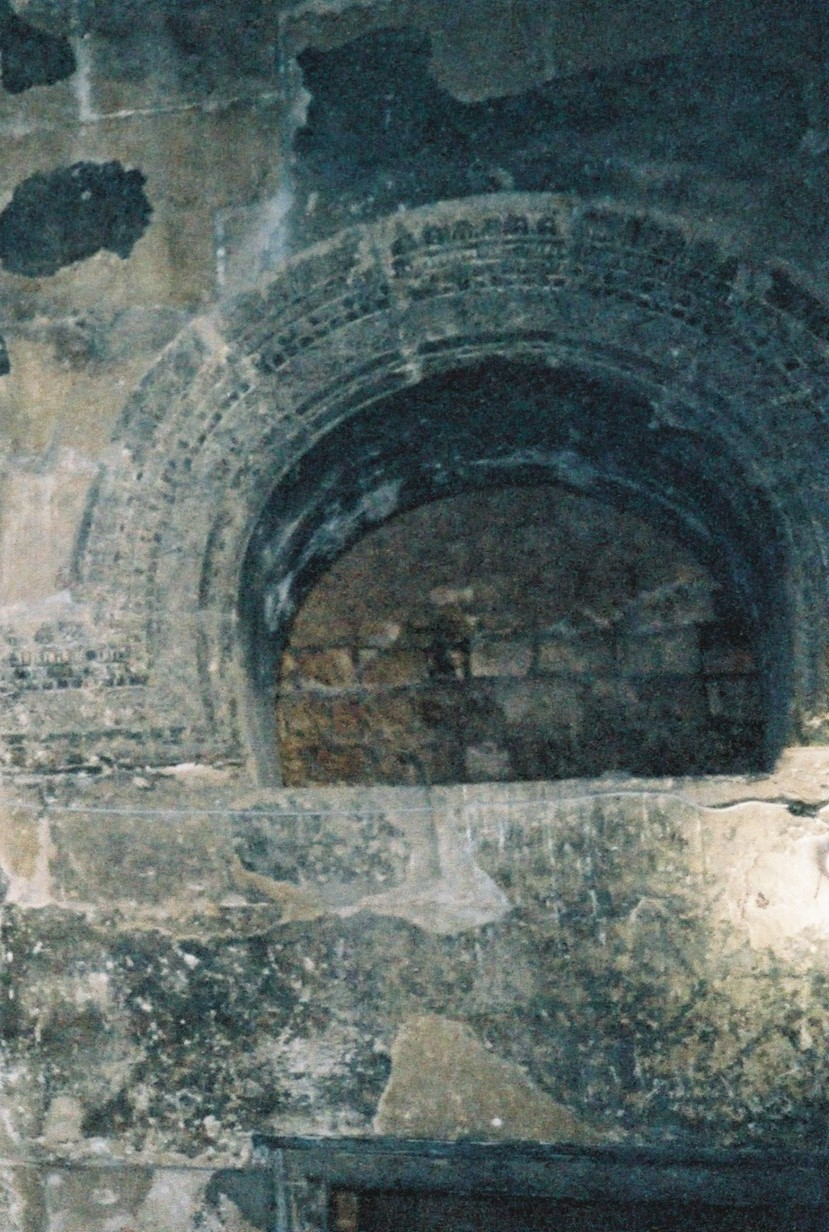
A horseshoe arch in the Church of Saint Jacob at Nusaybin

Another possible origin of the horseshoe arch motif is India, where rock-cut temples with mildly incurved horseshoe arches survive from early periods, though these were sculpted in rock rather than constructed, and probably imitate earlier forms in wood. For example, horseshoe arch shapes are found in parts of the Ajanta Caves and Karla Caves dating from around the 1st century BCE to 1st century CE.

Horseshoe arches made of baked brick have been found in the so-called Tomb of the Brick Arches in Aksum (present-day Ethiopia), built during the Kingdom of Aksum and tentatively dated to the 4th century CE. In a 1991 publication, archeologist Stuart C. Munro-Hay suggests that these could be evidence that transmission of architectural ideas took place via routes not previously considered by scholars. He suggests that the brick-built horseshoe arches could have been an Aksumite innovation based on ideas transmitted via trade with India.

Further evidence of their use is also found in early Christian architecture in Byzantine Anatolia and became characteristic of Christian architecture in Cappadocia, though the origins of this regional feature are sometimes debated. (Note: In a 1997 study, art historians Thomas F. Mathews and Annie-Christine Mathews Daskalakis argued that this feature of Cappadocian architecture was likely derived later from contemporary architecture in the neighboring Islamic world. Historians J. Eric Cooper and Michael J. Decker expressed a similar view in which the use of arcades of horseshoe arches on Cappadocian façades was inspired by Islamic architectural models, reflecting the cosmopolitan nature of Cappadocia in this era. Multiple other scholars, such as Nicole Thierry, Robert Ousterhout, and Philipp Niewöhner cite Mathews and Mathews Daskalakis in their discussion of horseshoe arches in the region but they suggest that the evidence points instead to earlier antecedents in Late Antique architecture.) An early example of its use in Anatolia is found at the Alahan Monastery in present-day southern Turkey, dating most likely from the 5th century CE. In Visigothic Spain, horseshoe arches are found, for example, in of the Church of Santa Eulalia de Boveda near Lugo and the Church of Santa Maria de Melque near Toledo. Some tombstones from that period have been found in the north of Spain with horseshoe arches in them, eliciting speculation about a pre-Roman local Celtic tradition.

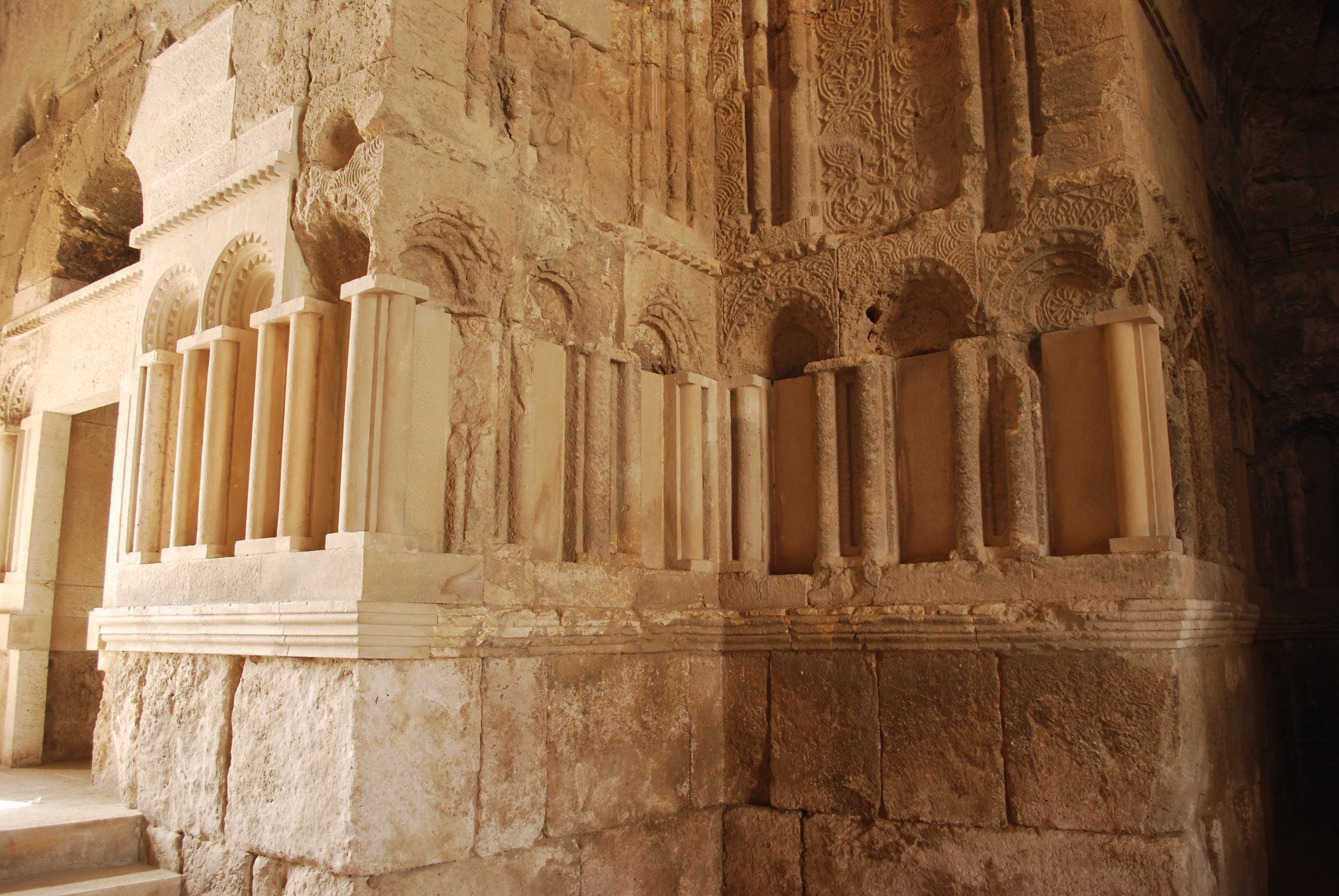
Horseshoe arches in the Umayyad palace at the Citadel of Amman (early 8th century, partially restored)

In early Islamic architecture, some horseshoe arches appeared in Umayyad architecture of the 7th to 8th centuries. They are found in the Umayyad Mosque of Damascus, though their horseshoe shape is not very pronounced. They are also found in the Umayyad Palace at the Amman Citadel in present-day Jordan.

According to Giovanni Teresio Rivoira, an archeologist writing in the early 20th century, the pointed variant of the horseshoe arch is of Islamic origin. According to Rivoira, this type of arch was first used in the Ibn Tulun Mosque, completed in 879. Wijdan Ali also describes this as the first systematic use of the pointed variant. Horseshoe arches of a slightly pointed form were also used in Aghlabid architecture of the 9th century, including the Great Mosque of Kairouan (circa 836) and the Mosque of Ibn Khayrun (866).

=== Development in the Iberian Peninsula and the Maghreb ===
It was in Al-Andalus (on the Iberian Peninsula) and western North Africa (the Maghreb) that horseshoe arches developed their characteristic form. Prior to the Muslim invasion of Spain, the Visigoths of the Iberian Peninsula used them in their architecture. Although it is possible that Andalusi architecture borrowed the horseshoe arch from Umayyad Syria, these local precedents make it just as likely that it developed locally instead. The "Moorish" arch, however, was of a slightly different and more sophisticated form than the Visigothic arch, being less flat and more circular.

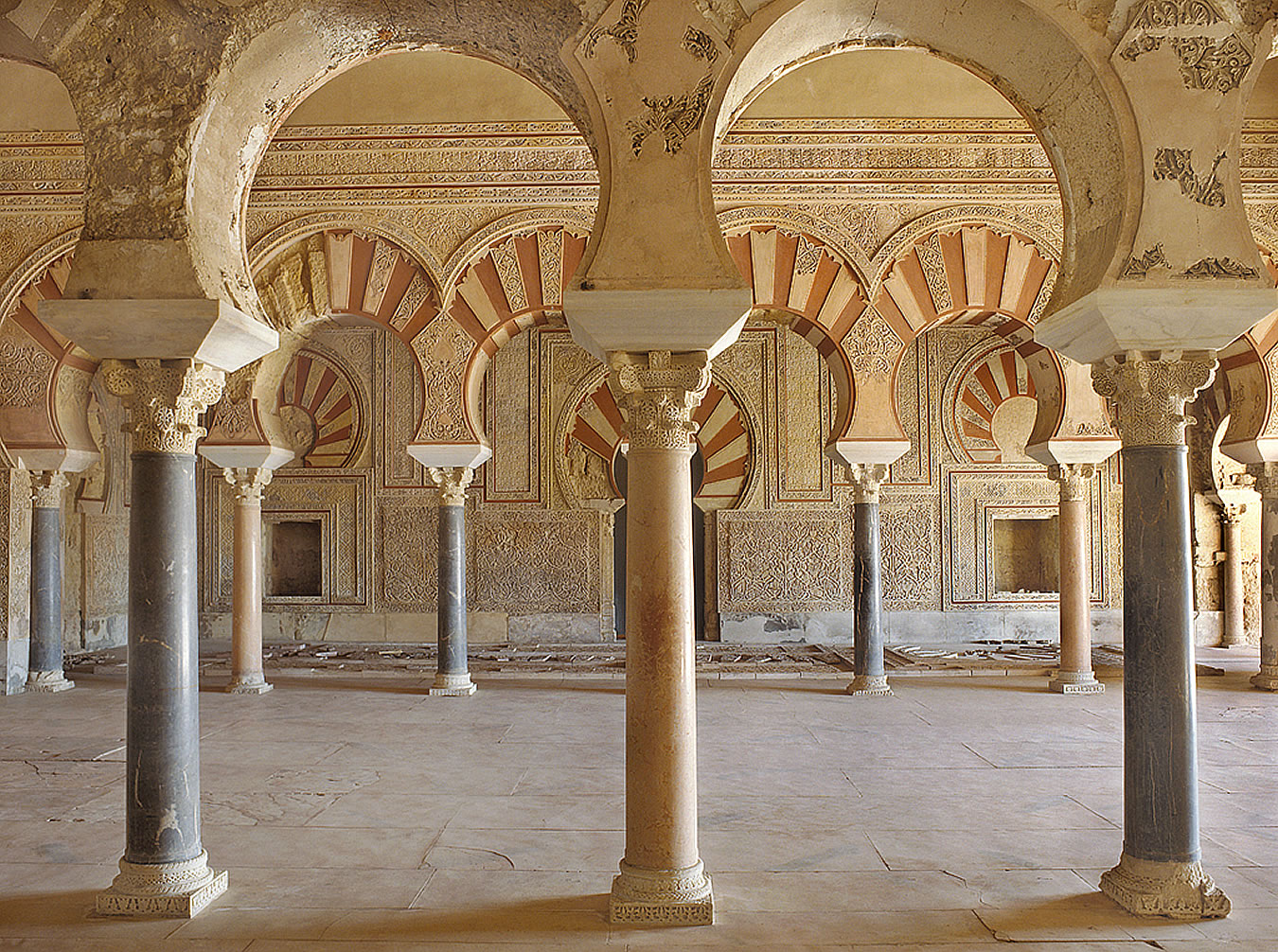
Reception hall of Madinat al-Zahra, Spain, with horseshoe arches typical of the 10th-century Caliphal period

The Umayyads of Al-Andalus, starting with the Emirate period, used horseshoe arches prominently and ubiquitously, often enclosing them in an alfiz (rectangular frame) to accentuate the effect of its shape. This can be seen at a large scale in their major work, the Great Mosque of Córdoba. Its most distinctive form, however, was consolidated in the 10th century during the Caliphal period, as seen at Madinat al-Zahra, where the arches consist of about three quarters of a circle and are framed in an alfiz. The Córdoban style of horseshoe arch spread all over the Caliphate and adjacent areas, and was adopted by the successor Muslim emirates of the peninsula, the taifas, as well as by the architecture of the Maghreb under subsequent dynasties. Its use remained especially consistent in the form of mosque mihrabs.

In the northern Iberian Peninsula, where Asturias and other Christian kingdoms ruled, the use of horseshoe arches continued under the influence of previous Visigothic architecture and of contemporary Islamic architecture. The addition of an alfiz around horseshoe arches was one detail more specifically borrowed from Islamic styles. Starting in the 9th century, some Mozarabs (Christians living under Muslim rule) left al-Andalus and settled in the northern Christian territories, (Note: The term "Mozarabic" is also applied to the culture of communities outside Al-Andalus, in the northern Christian territories, where Christians from al-Andalus immigrated and resettled, particularly in the 10th century. However, the term reboplación, among other alternatives, can be used to refer to this culture.) where they contributed to popularizing this form locally, as exemplified by San Miguel de Escalada (10th century). The Mozarabs also incorporated horseshoe arches into their art, such as in illuminated manuscripts.

Under the Almoravids (11th-12th centuries), the first pointed horseshoe arches began to appear in the region and then became more widespread during the Almohad period (12th-13th centuries). This pointed horseshoe arch is likely of North African origin. Art historian Georges Marçais attributed it in particular to Ifriqiya (present-day Tunisia), where it was present in earlier Aghlabid and Fatimid architecture.

As Muslim rule retreated in Al-Andalus, the Mudéjar style, which developed from the 12th to the 16th centuries under Spanish Christian rule, continued the tradition of horseshoe arches in the Iberian Peninsula. Horseshoe arches also continued to be used in the Maghreb, in the architecture of Morocco, Algeria, and Tunisia.

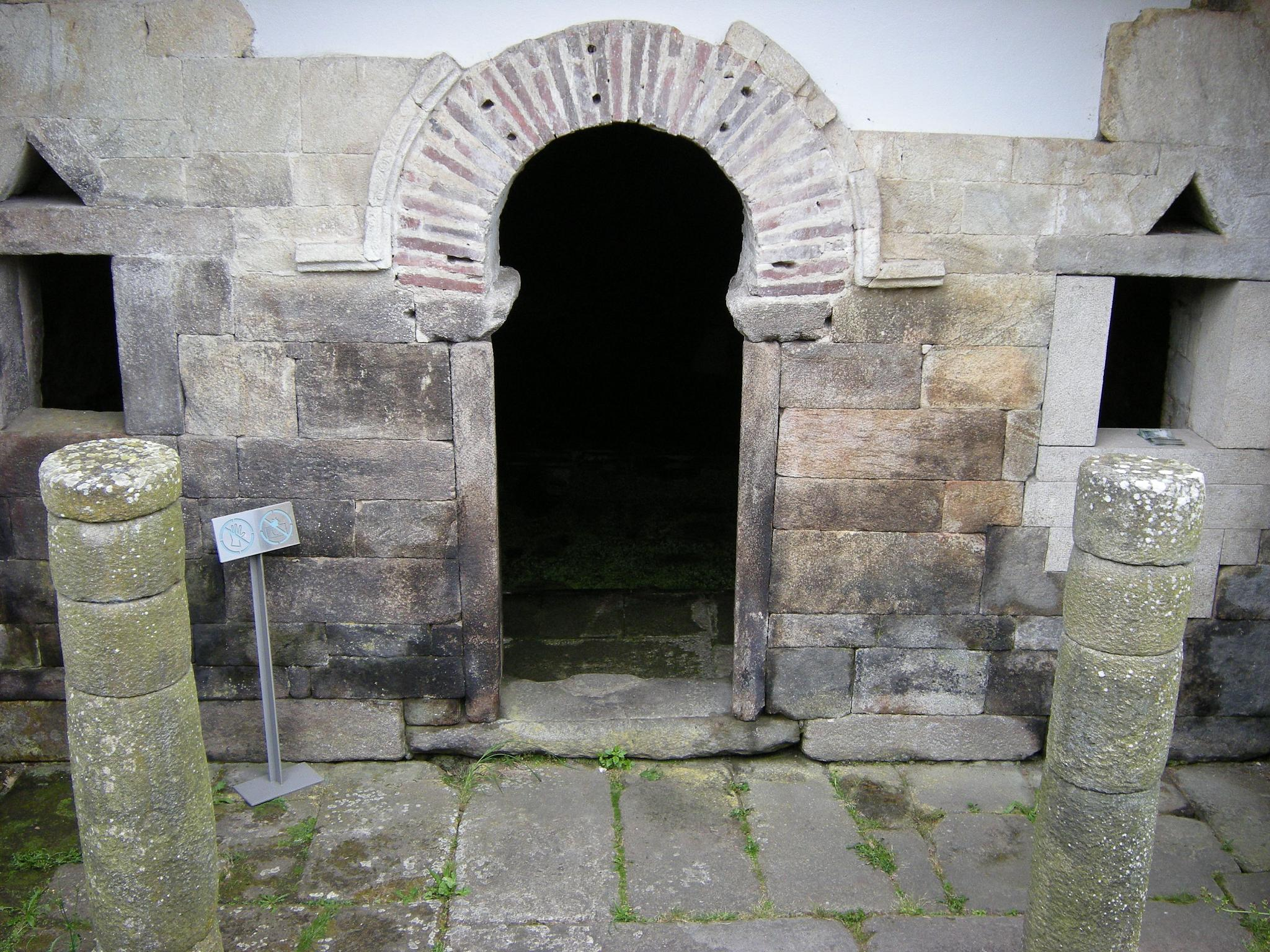
Church of Santa Eulalia de Bóveda near Lugo, Spain (4th-5th century), early Christian or Visigothic period

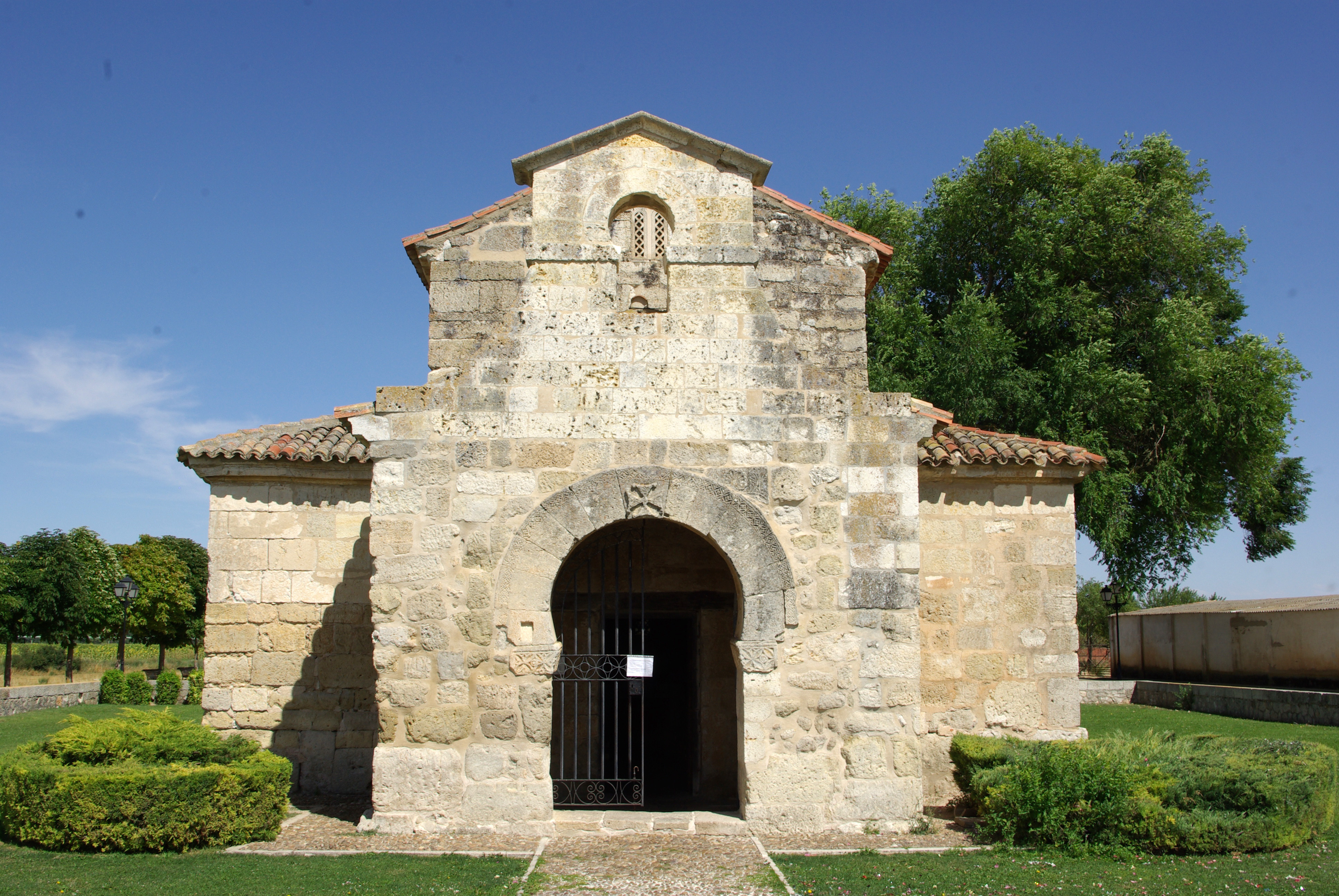
Church of San Juan de Baños in Spain (mid-7th century)

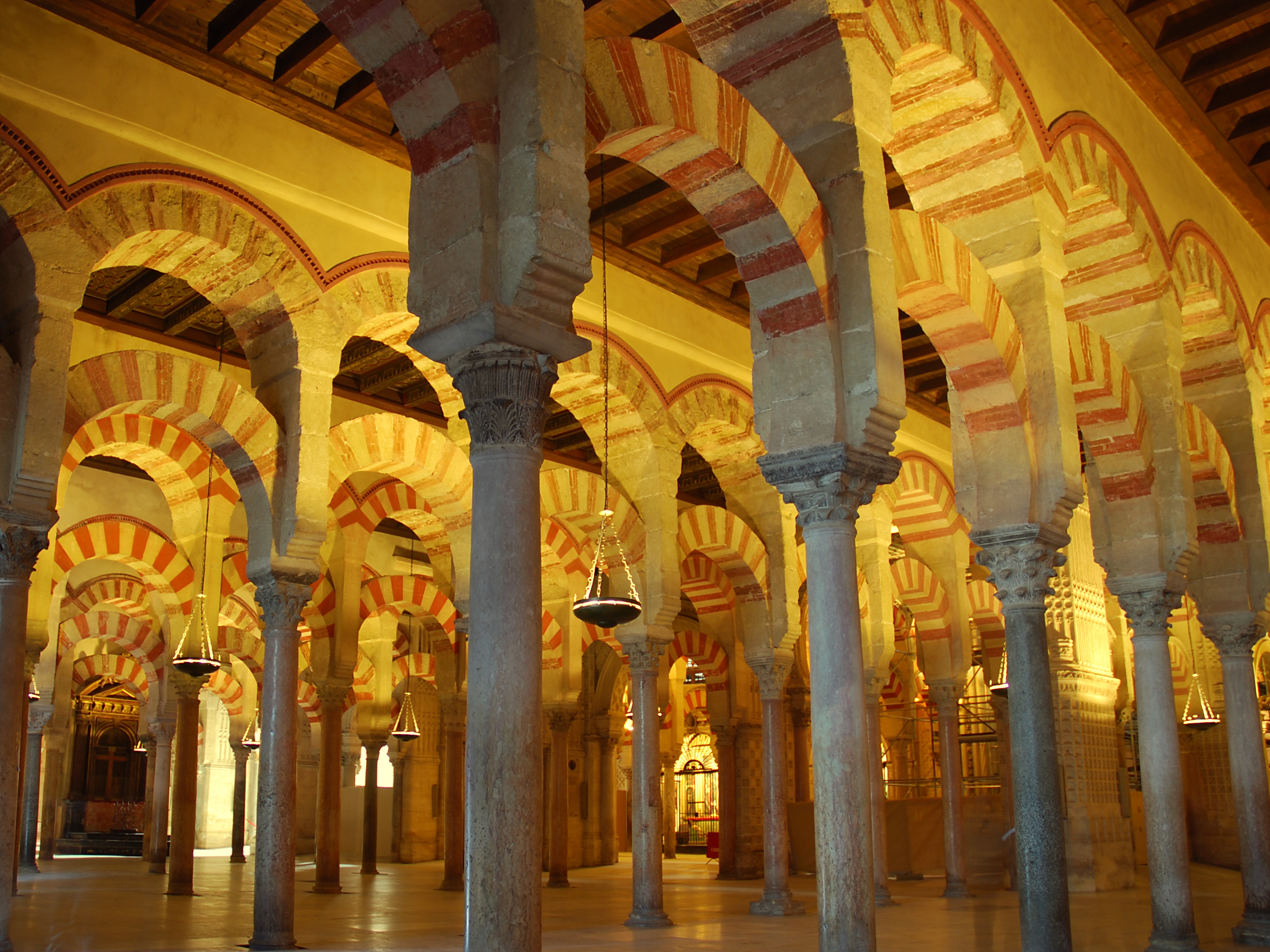
Prayer hall of the Great Mosque of Córdoba, Spain (late 8th century)

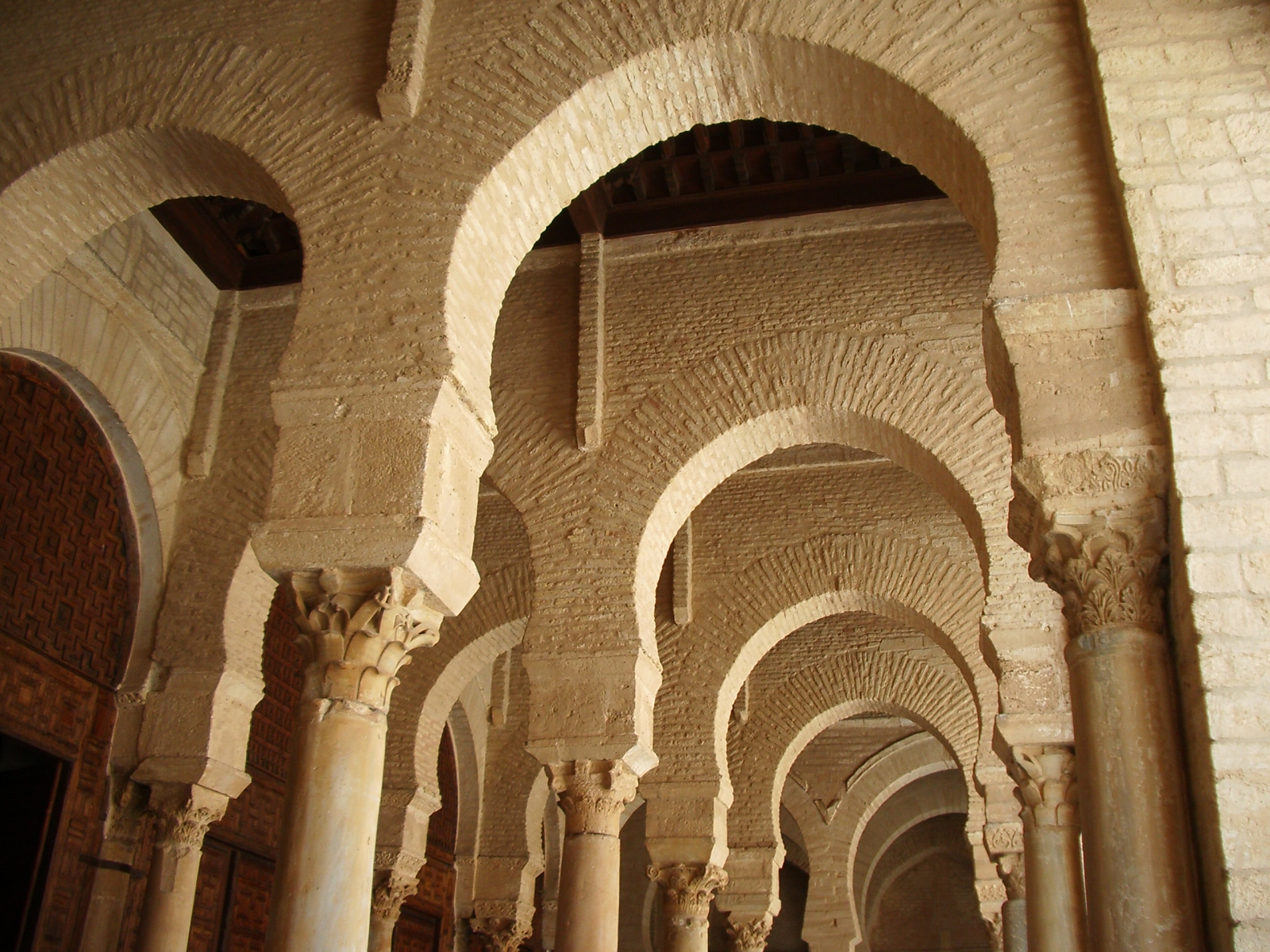
Horseshoe arches in the Great Mosque of Kairouan, Tunisia (9th century)

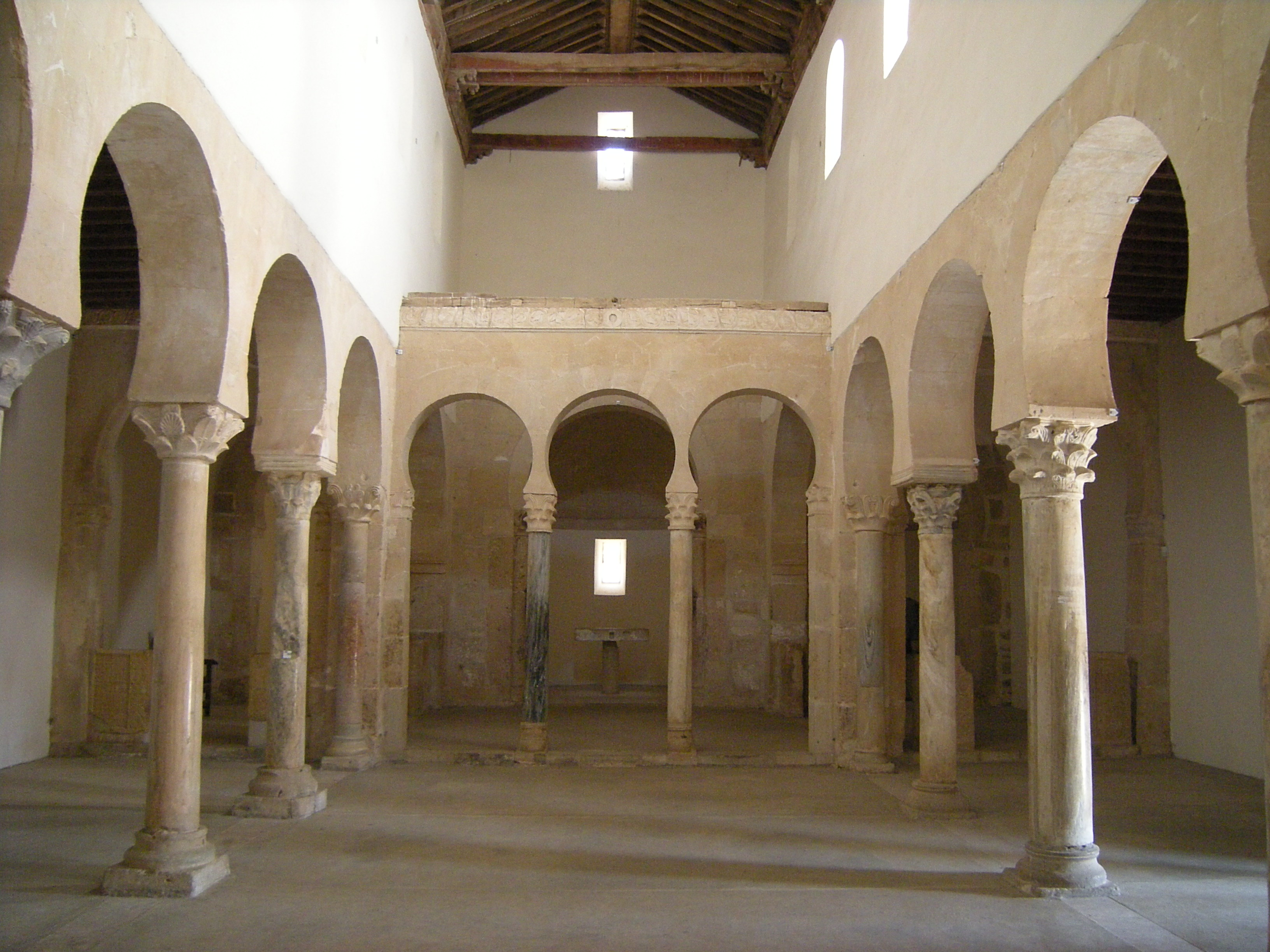
Church of San Miguel de Escalada near León, Spain (10th century); an example of Mozarabic or Repoblación architecture

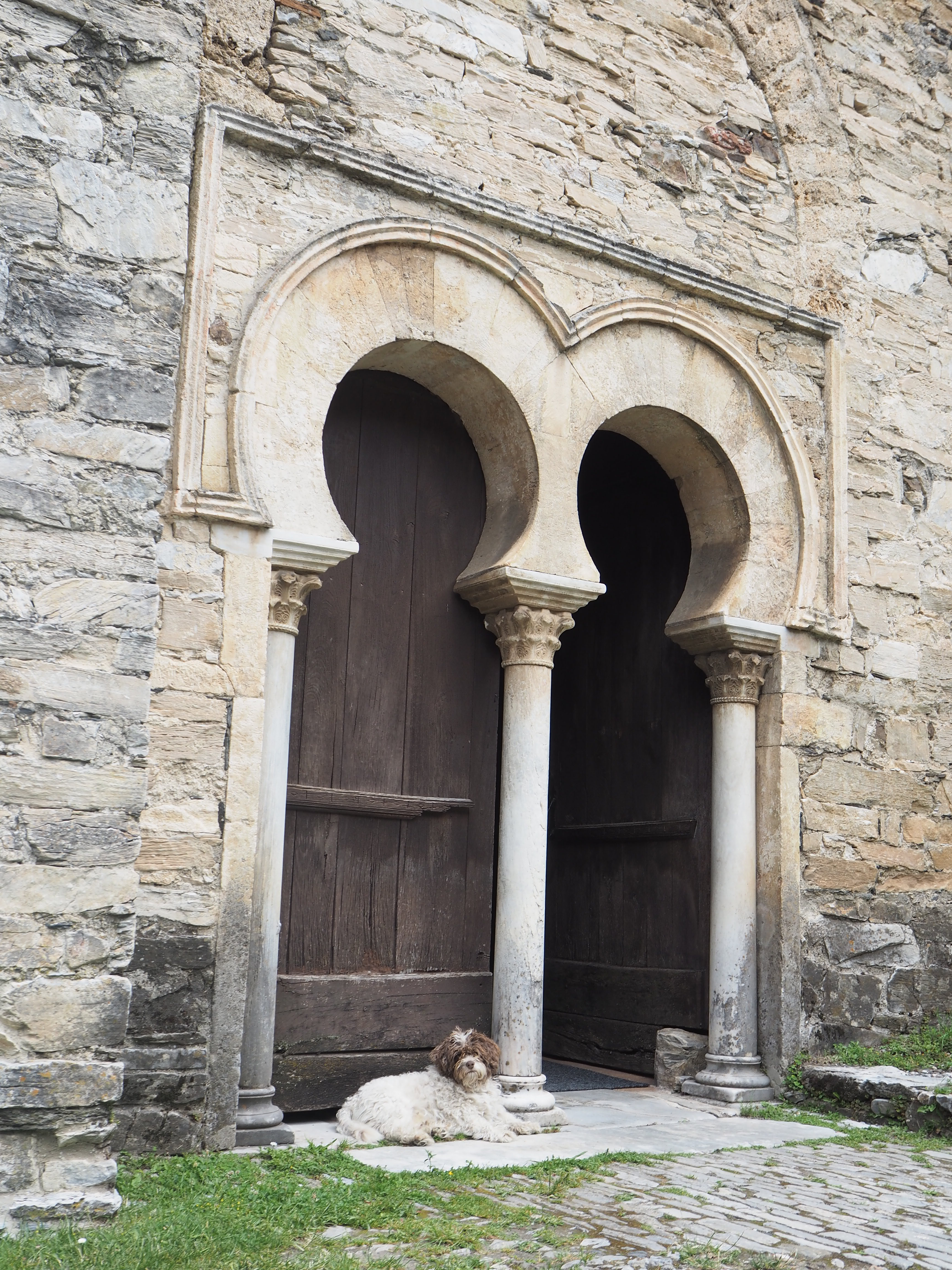
Arches with alfiz in the Mozarabic Church of Santiago de Peñalba (10th century)

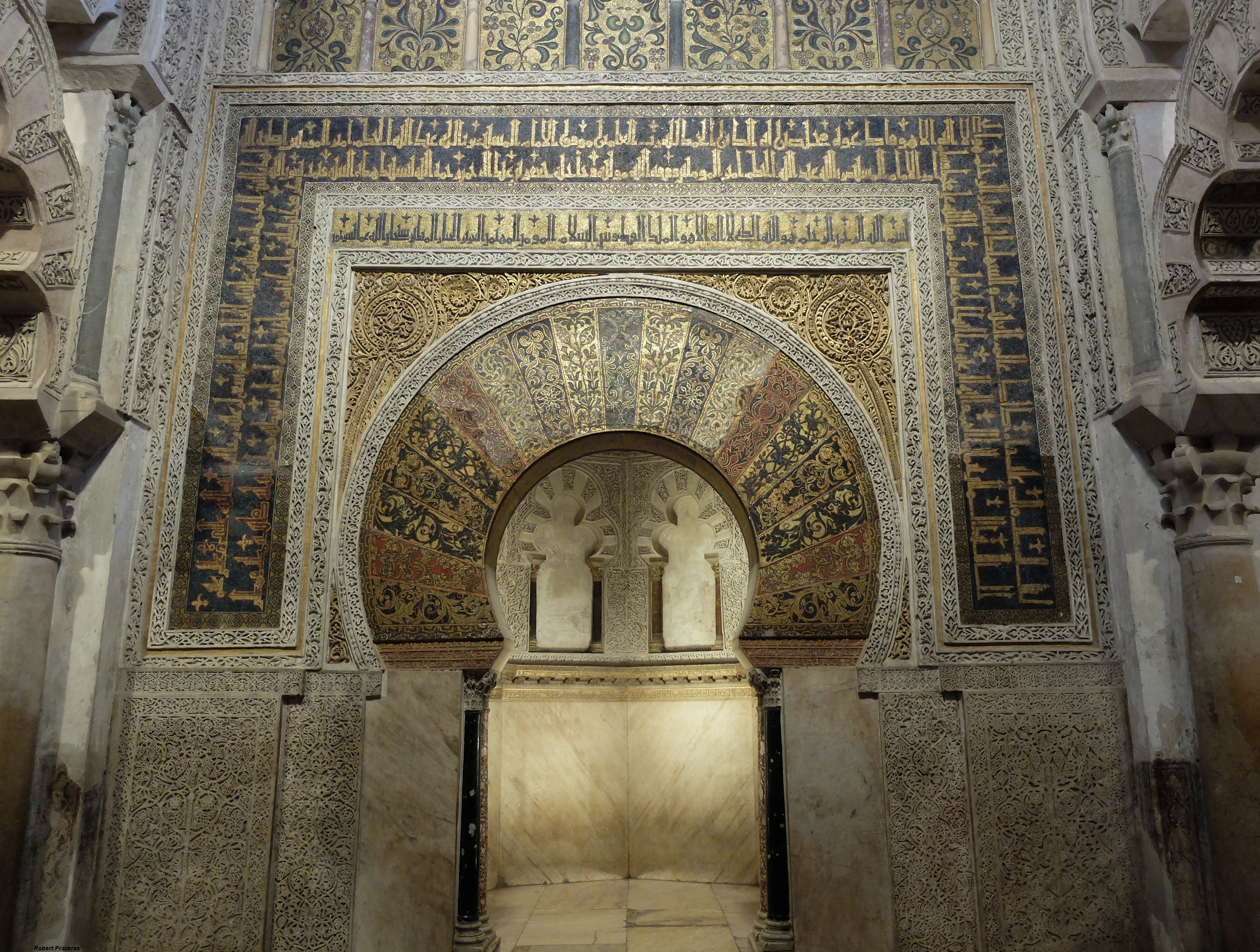
Mihrab of the Great Mosque of Córdoba (10th century), with horseshoe arch opening surrounded by a rectangular alfiz

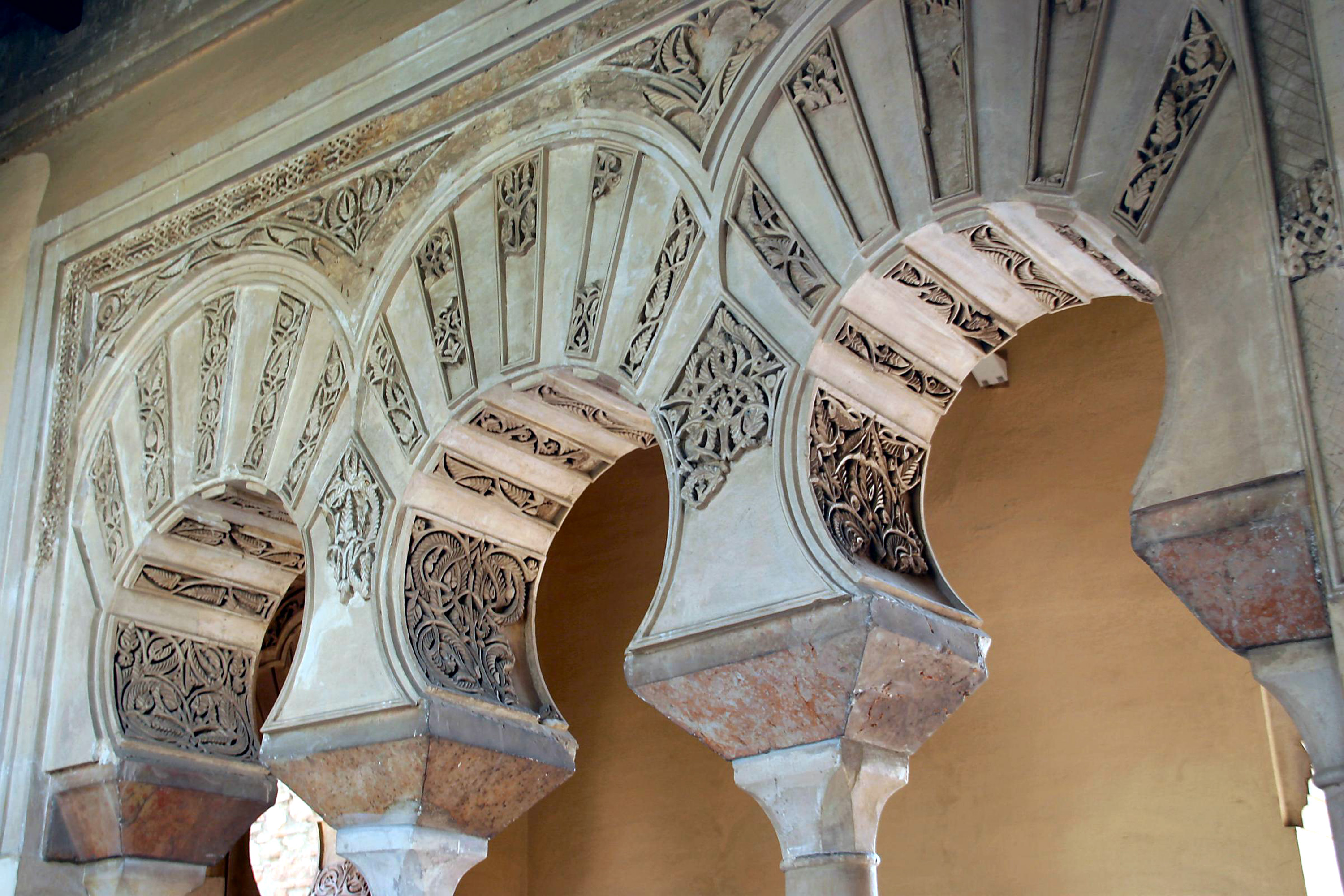
Caliphal-style arches of the Taifa palace (11th century) in the Alcazaba of Málaga, Spain

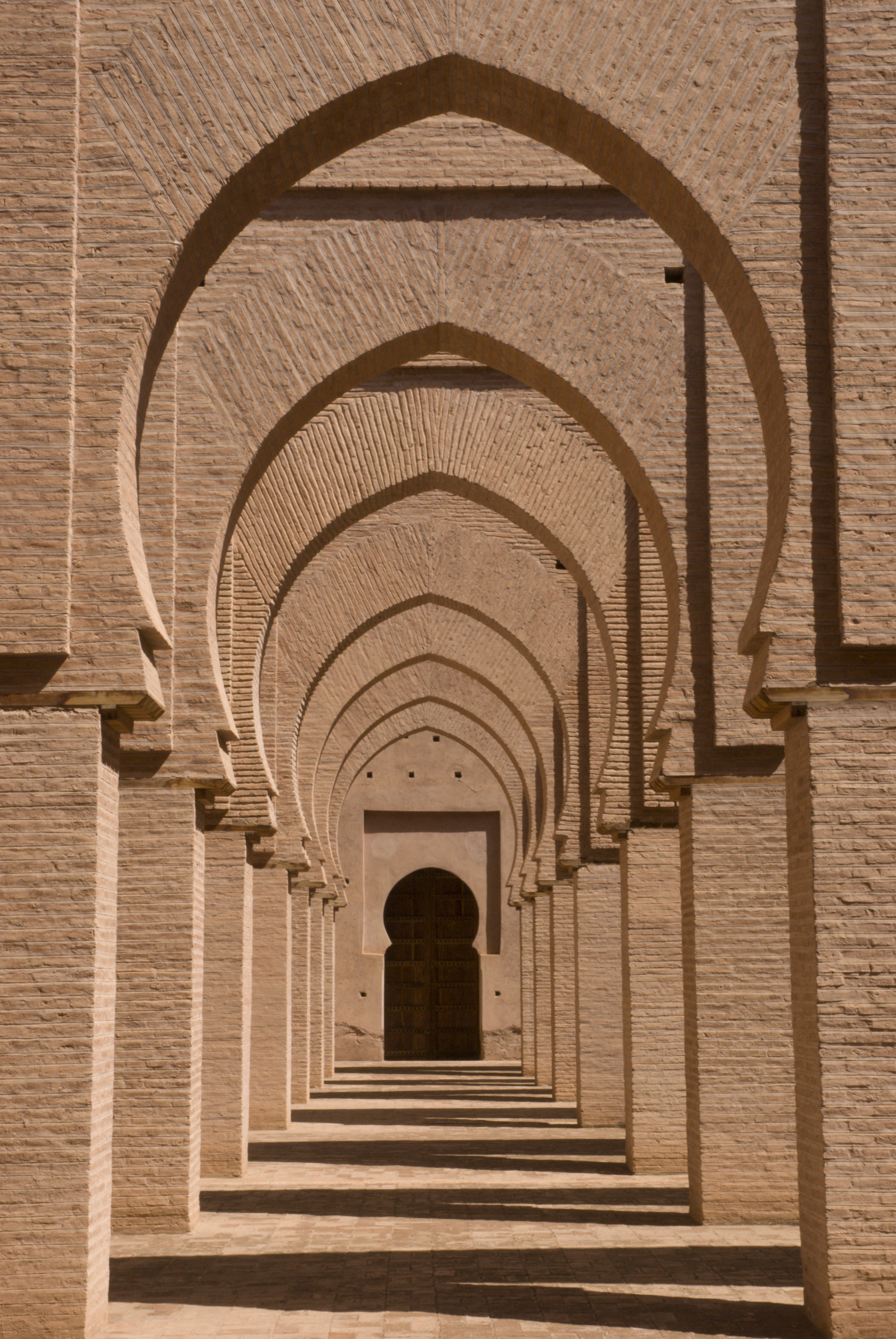
Pointed horseshoe arches in the Mosque of Tinmal, Morocco (12th century), typical of the Almohad period and afterwards

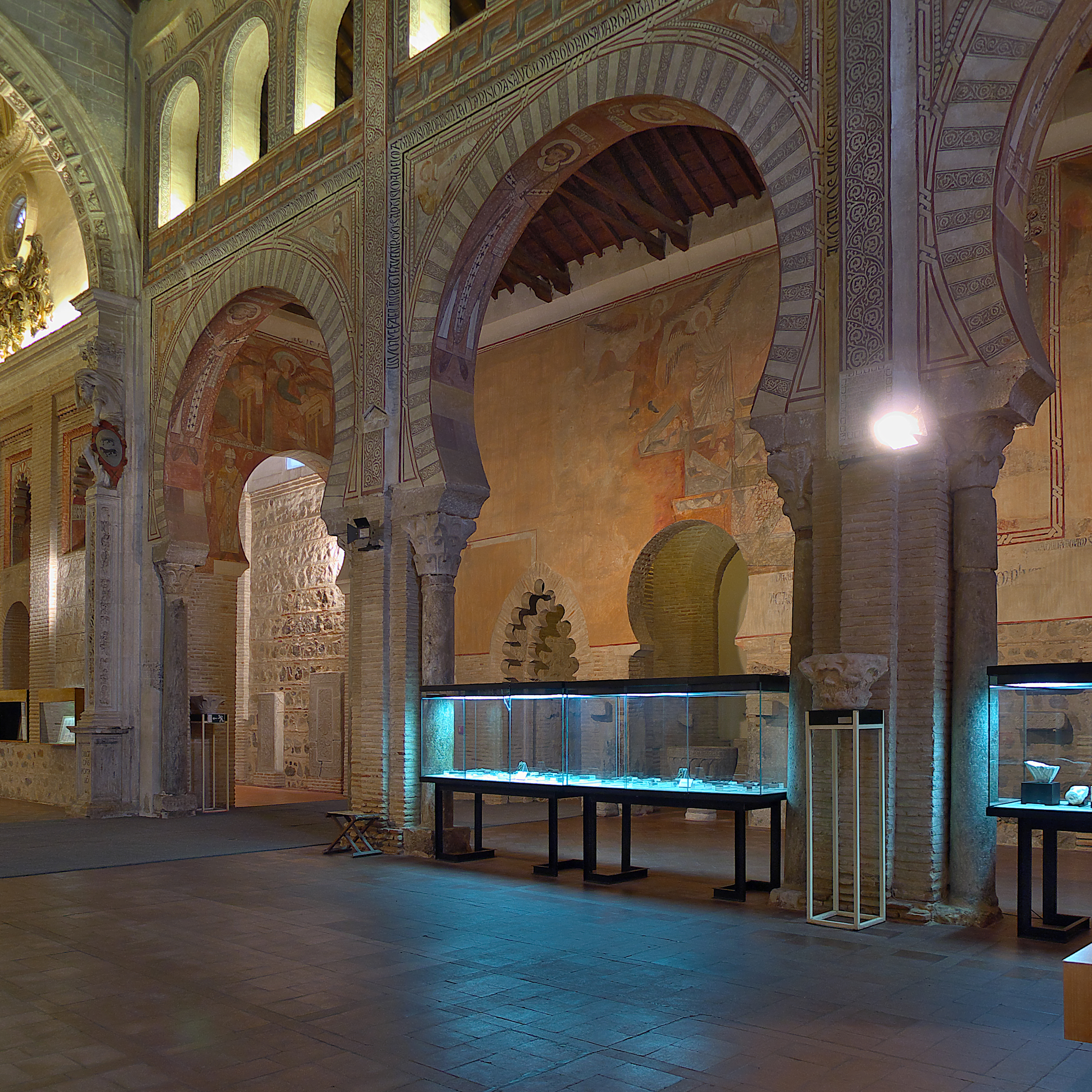
Mudéjar architecture in the Church of San Roman in Toledo, Spain (12th or 13th century)

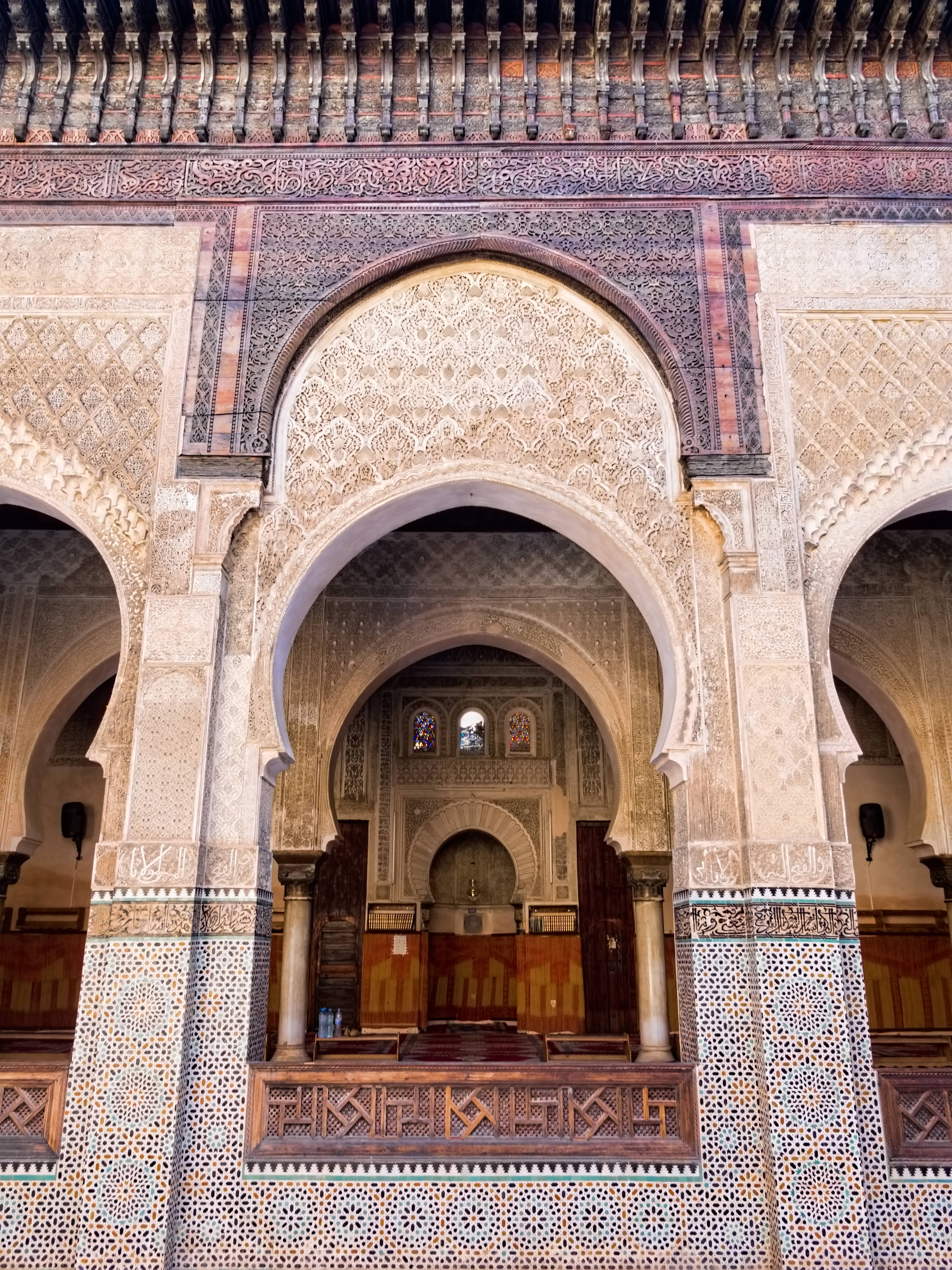
Bou Inania Madrasa of Fez, Morocco (14th century), from the Marinid period

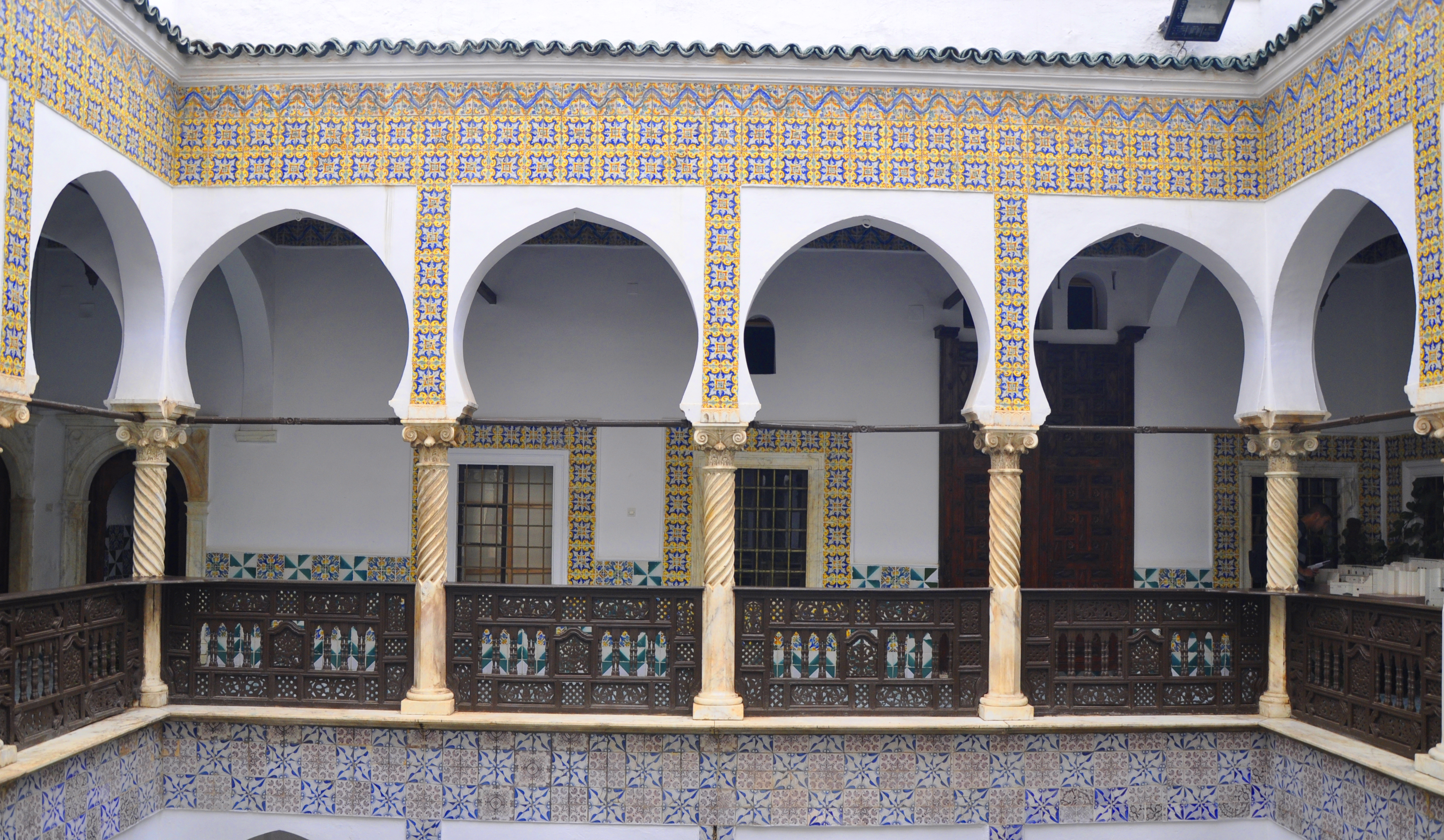
Pointed horseshoe arches in Dar Mustapha Pasha in Algiers, Algeria (1799)

=== Use in other parts of the Islamic world ===
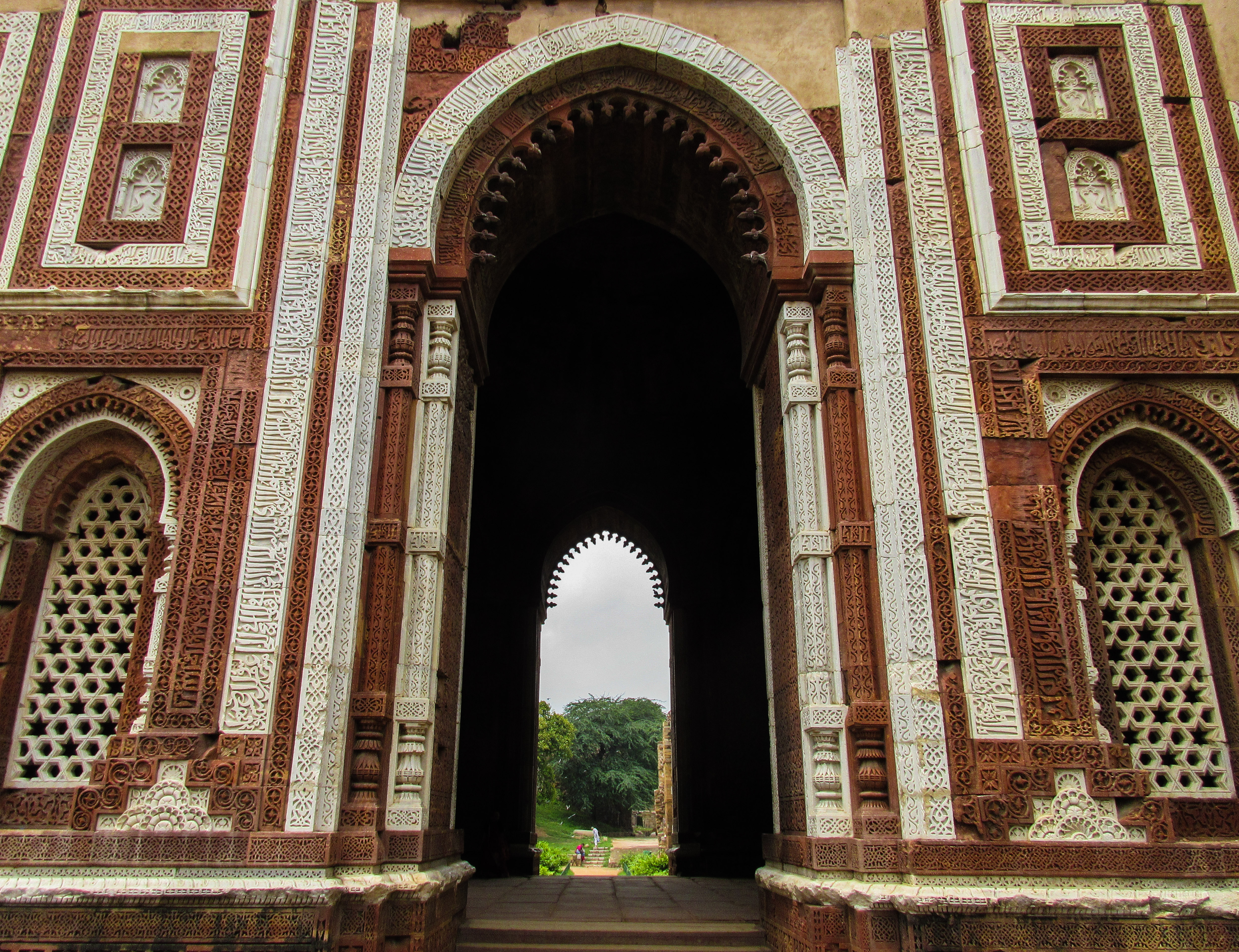
Horseshoe arches at the Alai Darwaza gate in the Qutb Minar Complex, Delhi (1311)

Horseshoe arches were also common in Ghurid and Ghaznavid architecture (11th-13th centuries) in Central Asia, though in this region they had sharp pointed apexes, in contrast with those of the western Islamic world. Sometimes they were cusped or given multifoil flourishes. Around the same time or not long afterward, they begin to appear as far east as India, in Indo-Islamic architecture, such as in the Alai Darwaza gatehouse (dating from 1311) at the Qutb Complex in Delhi, though they were not a consistent feature in India.

Some pointed arches with a slightly horseshoe shape appear in Ayyubid architecture in Syria. It appears, exceptionally, in some instances of Mamluk architecture. For example, it appears in some details of the Sultan Qalawun Complex in Cairo, built in 1285. Andalusi-style horseshoe arches are also found alongside the minaret of the Mosque of Ibn Tulun in Cairo, probably dating from 13th-century renovations ordered by Sultan Lajin to the older 9th-century mosque.

=== Use in Moorish revival architecture ===
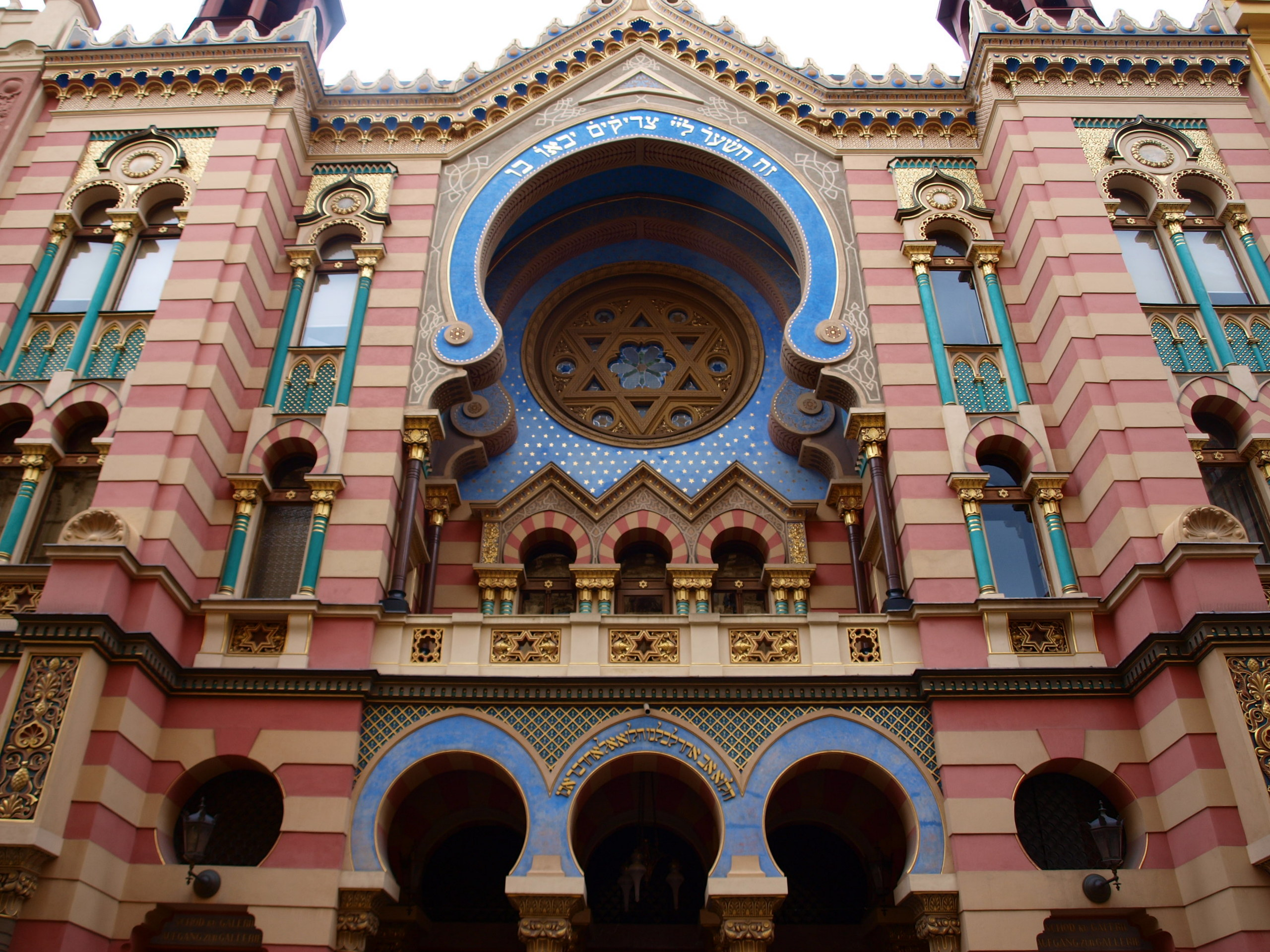
Jerusalem Synagogue in Prague, Czech Republic, an example of Moorish Revival architecture (1906)

In addition to their use across the Islamic world, horseshoe arches became popular in Western countries in Moorish Revival architecture, which became fashionable in the 19th century. They were widely used in Moorish Revival synagogues. They were employed in the Neo-Mudéjar style in Spain, another type of Moorish Revival style. They are used in some forms of Indo-Saracenic Revival architecture, a 19th-century style associated with the British Raj.

=== Use in Art Nouveau ===
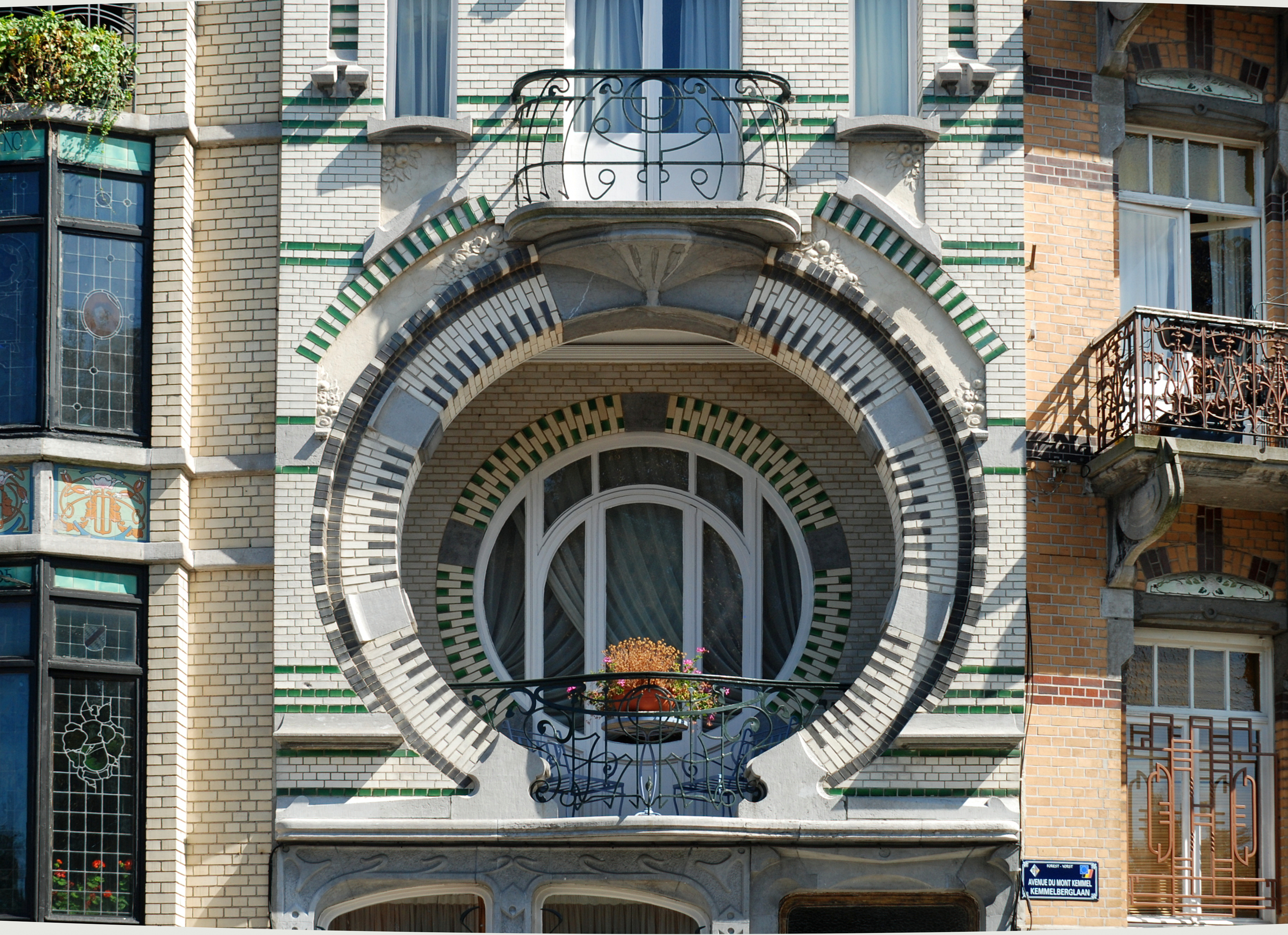
Exaggerated Art Nouveau horseshoe arch at Villa Beau-Site, Brussels (1905)

Exaggerated horseshoe arches were also popular in some forms of Art Nouveau architecture, notably in Brussels. Among other examples, this can be seen on the street façade of the Cauchie House.
