= Hieronymites =

Catholic cloistered monastics of Jerome

Order of Saint Jerome
- Abbreviation: OSH
- Formation: Late 14th century
- Type: Catholic enclosed religious order
- Headquarters: Orden de San Jerónimo; Monasterio de Santa María del Parral; Subida al Parral, 2; 40003 - Segovia, Spain
- Website: www.monjesjeronimos.es

The Hieronymites (also spelled Jeronymites or Jeronimites, also formally known as the Order of Saint Jerome (Latin: Ordo Sancti Hieronymi; abbreviated OSH), is a Catholic cloistered religious order and a common name for several congregations of hermit monks living according to the Rule of Saint Augustine, though the role principle of their lives is that of the 5th-century hermit and biblical scholar Jerome.

The principal group with this name was founded in the Iberian Peninsula around the 14th century. Their religious habit is a white tunic with a brown, hooded scapular and a brown mantle. For liturgical services, they wear a brown cowl.

== Origins ==
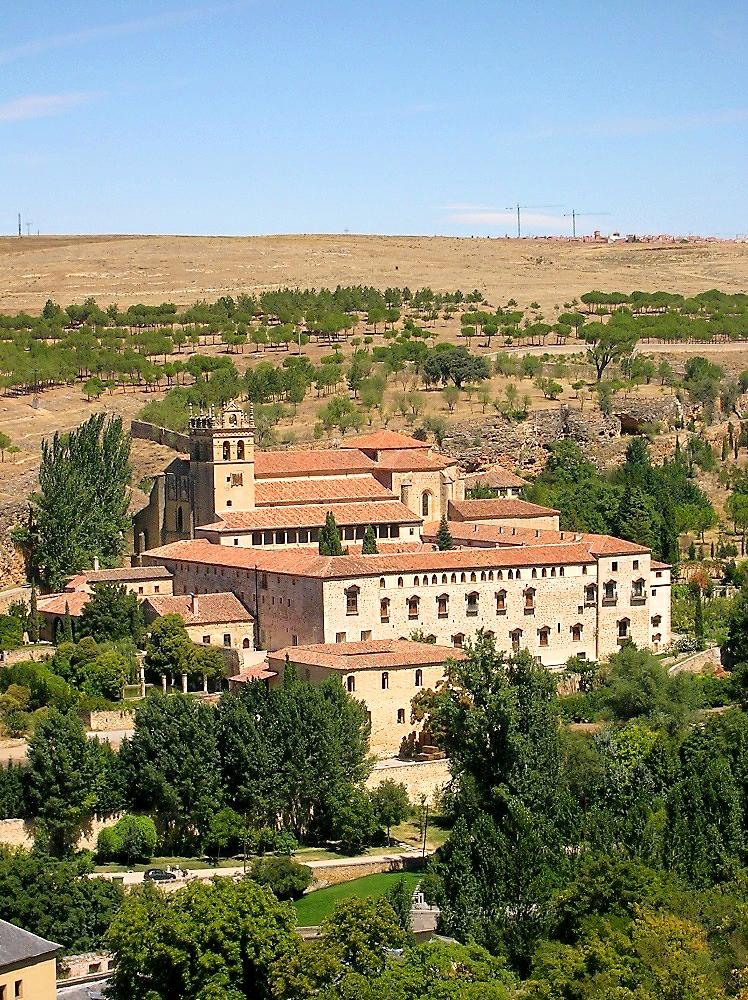
The Monastery of Saint Mary of Parral, the current headquarters of the Order of Saint Jerome.

Established near Toledo, Spain, the order developed from a spontaneous interest of a number of eremitical communities in both Spain and Portugal imitating the life of Jerome and Paula of Rome. This way of life soon became widespread in Spain. Two of these hermits, Pedro Fernández y Pecha and Fernando Yáñez y de Figueroa, decided it would be more advantageous to live a more regular way of life in a community, under an authorized monastic rule.

Under their leadership, the Monastery of Saint Bartholomew was then founded in Lupiana, with Fernández y Pecha acting as the first prior. On 18 October 1373, Pope Gregory XI issued a papal bull recognizing them as a religious order, under the Rule of Saint Augustine. The constitutions included the teachings of their patron saint. By 1415 there numbered 25 houses following this spirit; in that year, they were united by the Pope and given the status of an exempt order, free from episcopal jurisdiction.

From its outset, the order enjoyed great favor from the king of Spain, and soon possessed some of the most famous monasteries in the Iberian Peninsula: including the Royal Monastery of Saint Mary of Guadalupe in Extremadura, Spain; the Royal Monastery of Saint Mary of Bethlehem in Lisbon, Portugal; and the magnificent monastery built by Philip II of Spain at El Escorial, where the kings of Spain were buried.

Though their way of life was very austere, the Hieronymites also devoted themselves to study and to active ministry, possessing great influence at the courts both of Spain and of Portugal. In the 16th century they were a major supporter of the efforts of the Portuguese mystic John of God, who established the nursing order in Granada bearing his name. Missionaries to both Spanish and Portuguese America played a considerable part spreading Christianity in the New World.

Hieronymite nuns were founded in 1375 by Maria Garcias, and became numerous throughout the Iberian peninsula.

== Religious habit ==
The religious habit of the monks of the Order of Saint Jerome is white and includes the brown scapular.

The members of the order (monks and nuns) adopted as their religious habit a white tunic with a brown scapular (similar to the Scapular of Our Lady of Mount Carmel used by the Carmelites) and a hood, over which is worn a brown mantle or cowl of the same color.

== American mission ==
The islands of the Antilles in the Caribbean were entrusted to them for pastoral care by Cardinal Francisco Jiménez de Cisneros, who sent a small party of three monks to Hispaniola. They were originally sent to deal with the issue of accusations against the Spanish colonists of atrocities against the native population. These charges had been most vocally leveled by the noted priest Bartolomé de las Casas, who was a secular priest at the time. They appear to have been ineffectual in preventing the abuses which de la Casas had charged.

The leader of the monks, Luis de Figueroa, was later named the third bishop of Santo Domingo in 1523, which at the time also included the islands of Cuba and Puerto Rico. He died in 1526, before he could be consecrated as a bishop. Another member of the order, Juan de Arzolaras (or Alzóloras), served as the Archbishop of Santo Domingo (1566–1568), before being transferred to serve as the Bishop of the Canary Islands.

== Modern era ==
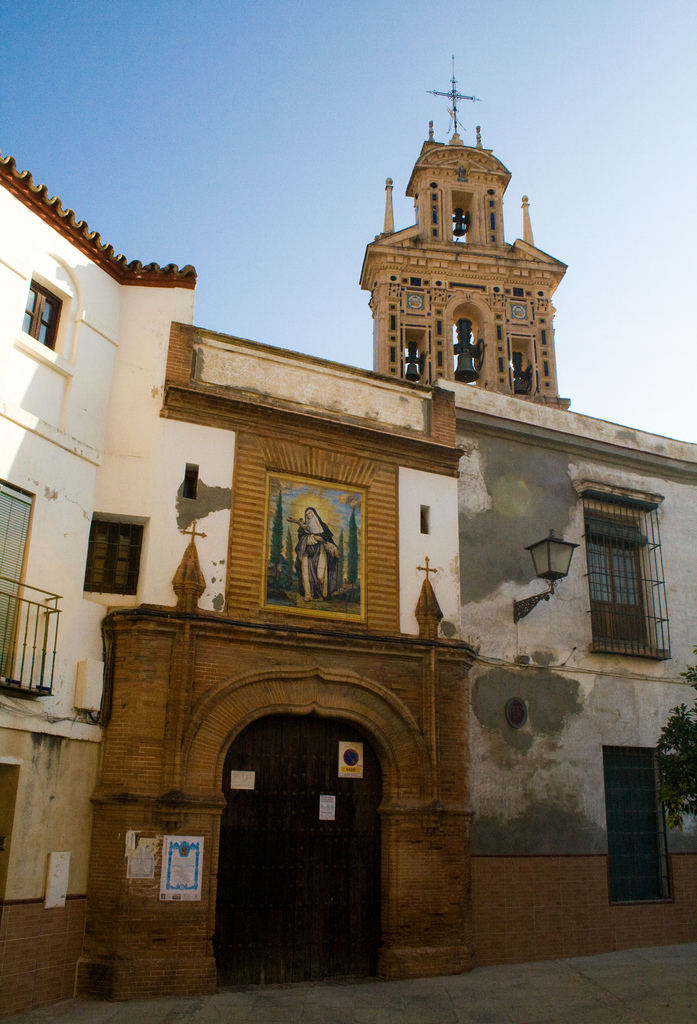
Entrance of the nuns' monastery of Saint Paula (Seville, Spain).

The men's branch of the order declined during the 18th century and was completely suppressed in 1835 by the Spanish government. At that time, there were 48 monasteries with about a thousand monks. The fate of the monastery buildings was varied. Most of them fell into ruins, others were given to other religious orders, still others became breweries, barns, or holiday homes.

According to canon law, only the Holy See may suppress a religious order, and the Holy See possesses the right to restore that order should it see fit, for up to a century. In 1925, the Hieronymite nuns (who were not affected by the suppression) petitioned the Holy See for a restoration of the men's branch. This was granted, with a new community of monks being established at the Monastery of Saint Mary of Parral in Segovia. However, the troubles of the Republic of 1931 and of the subsequent Spanish Civil War of 1936-1939 prevented any real progress until the general government of the order was constituted in 1969.

As of 2012 one community of monks exists, that of Saint Mary of Parral, and 18 monasteries of nuns (17 in Spain and one in India). The Hieronymite Order is a monastic one, now purely contemplative. Through solitude and silence, assiduous prayer, and healthy penance, the order attempts to bring its monks into closer union with God. The Hieronymite is conscious that the more intensely he dedicates himself to the monastic life, the more fruitful becomes the life of the Church as a whole. Hieronymites believe that their prayer can have a profound impact on the world outside the monastery.

This is the environment in which the life of the Hieronymite monk is developed, with the morning usually spent in manual work—the normal means of support for monks—while afternoons are dedicated to contemplation, prayer and study. Throughout the course of the day, the monks also gather for the singing of the Liturgy of the Hours as well as the celebration of the Eucharist. The Hieronymite strives to allow these moments of prayer to flow through his way of life, so that his goal is to express his life in complete charity towards all people.

Hieronymites believe this inwardly-directed manner of life is an exquisite and effective form of apostolic outreach. They believe that in the middle of a restless world, there are those who are called by God to spend some time living in monastic solitude. For this reason, Hieronymite monasteries readily welcome visitors who are guaranteed silence and prayerful support.

As of 2010, there were 11 monks in the order, of whom four were priests. This is down from a high of 21 monks in 1990.

== The nuns of the Order ==
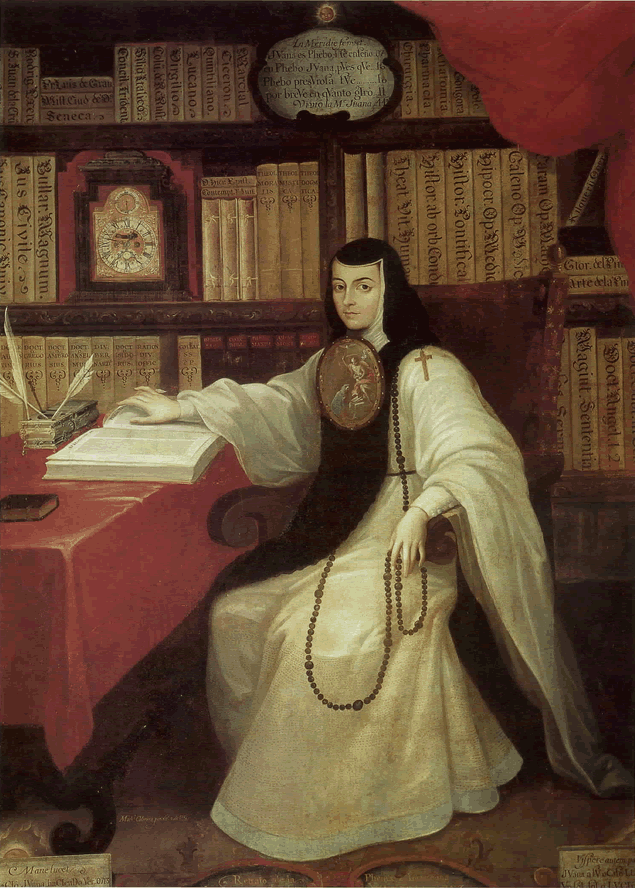
Sor Juana Inés de la Cruz, Hieronymite nun of colonial Mexico

Alongside the Hieronymite monks, there are the Hieronymite nuns. They began in Toledo, Spain, when María García (†1426) and Mayor Gómez headed a group of women who began living lives of simplicity and prayer. Finally, they joined in a common life in order to consecrate their lives to God in prayer and penance. As a result of their community, in 1374, Fernández y Pecha, the prior of the original community of monks, founded the Monastery of Santa Maria de La Sisla near that city. He then looked after the women, guiding them and outlining for them a way of life similar to that of the monks.

This first foundation was the origin of the Monastery of Saint Paul of the "beatas de San Jerónimo", as they began to be called. Their continued observance of their rules and sanctity led to their spread in various places throughout the Iberian Peninsula and in New Spain. In 1585 in Mexico City, the convent of San Jerónimo y Santa Paula was founded. Seventeenth-century Hieronymite Sor Juana Inés de la Cruz was that convent's most famous member, known in her own era as "the Tenth Muse."

== Other and ancient communities ==
- Hieronymites of the Observance (of Lombardy): A reform of the above, effected by the third general in 1424; it embraced seven houses in Spain and seventeen in Italy, mostly in Lombardy. It is now extinct.
- Poor Hermits of Saint Jerome (Pisa): Established near Pisa in 1377, this congregation established nearly fifty houses, of which only two survive, one in Rome and one in Viterbo, Italy.
- Hermits of Saint Jerome (Fiesole): The congregation of Fiesole was established in 1406. They had forty houses but in 1668 they were united with those of Pisa.
- Hermits of Saint Jerome (Stiavnicke Bane, Slovakia): The Hieronymites established a congregation in Štiavnické Bane (or Siegelsberg, Hegybánya) in 1733, then the Kingdom of Hungary. They are now extinct.

== Current communities ==
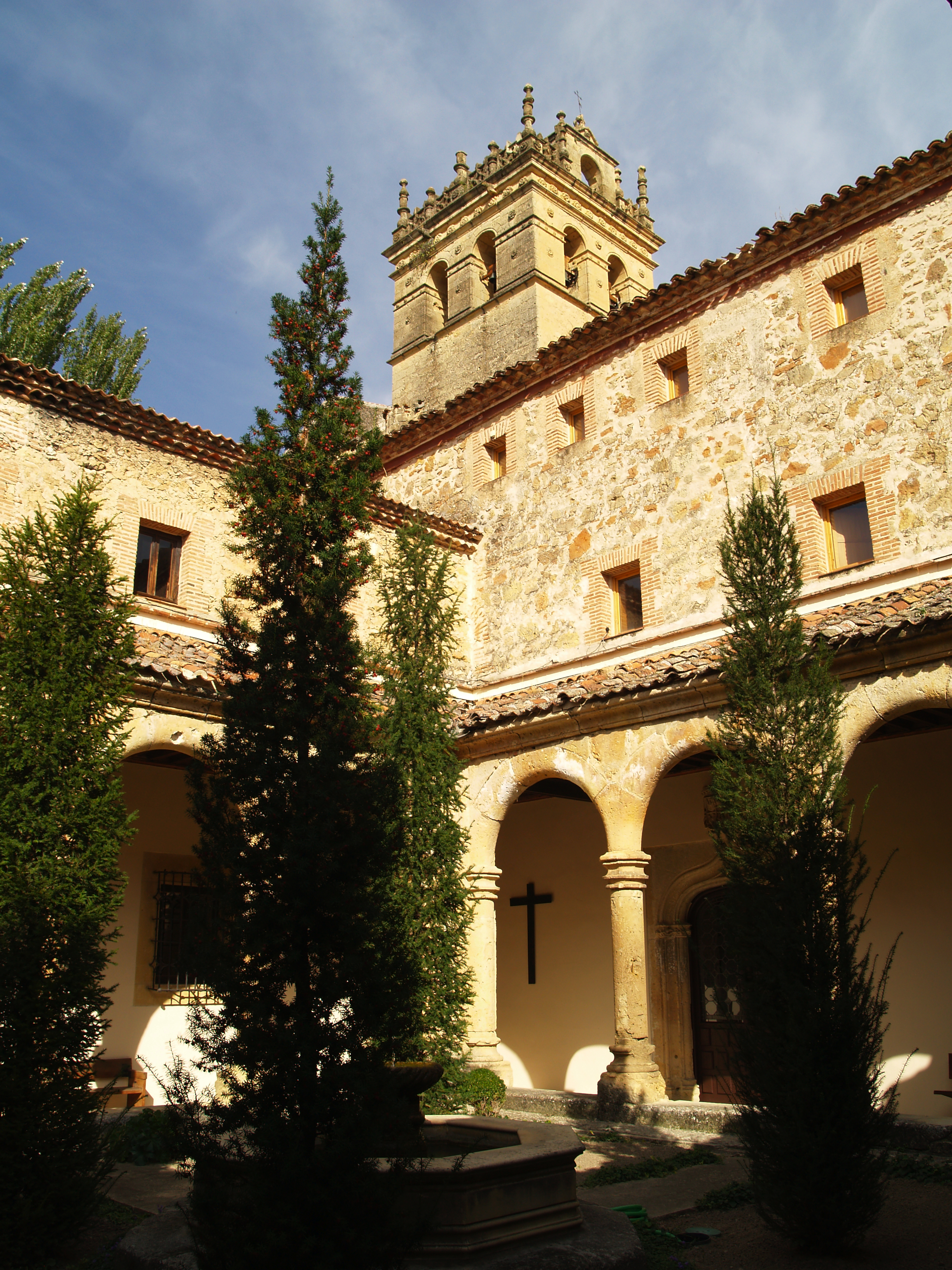
Cloister of the Monastery of Parral (Segovia, Spain).

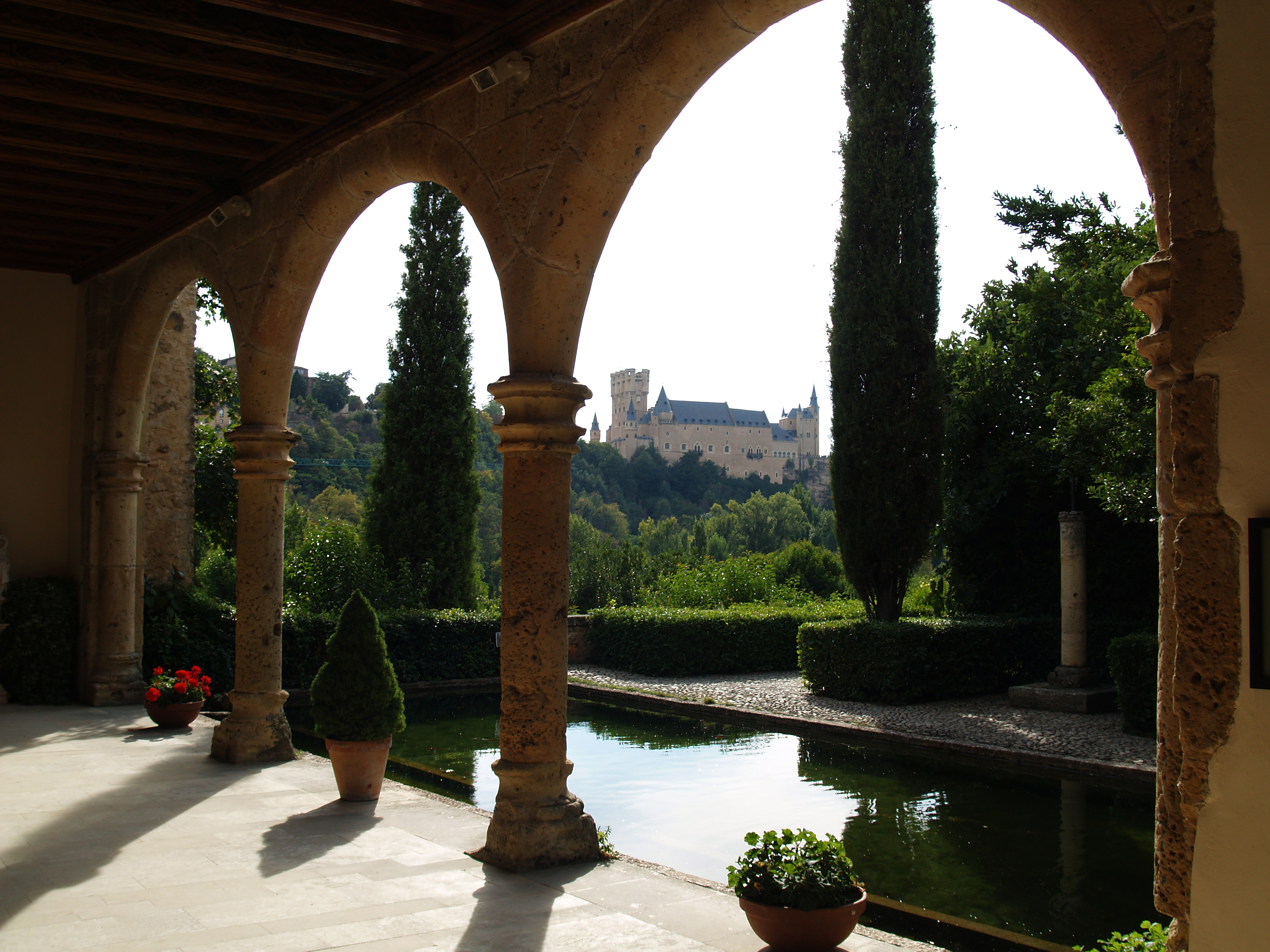
Garden of the Monastery of Parral (Segovia, Spain).

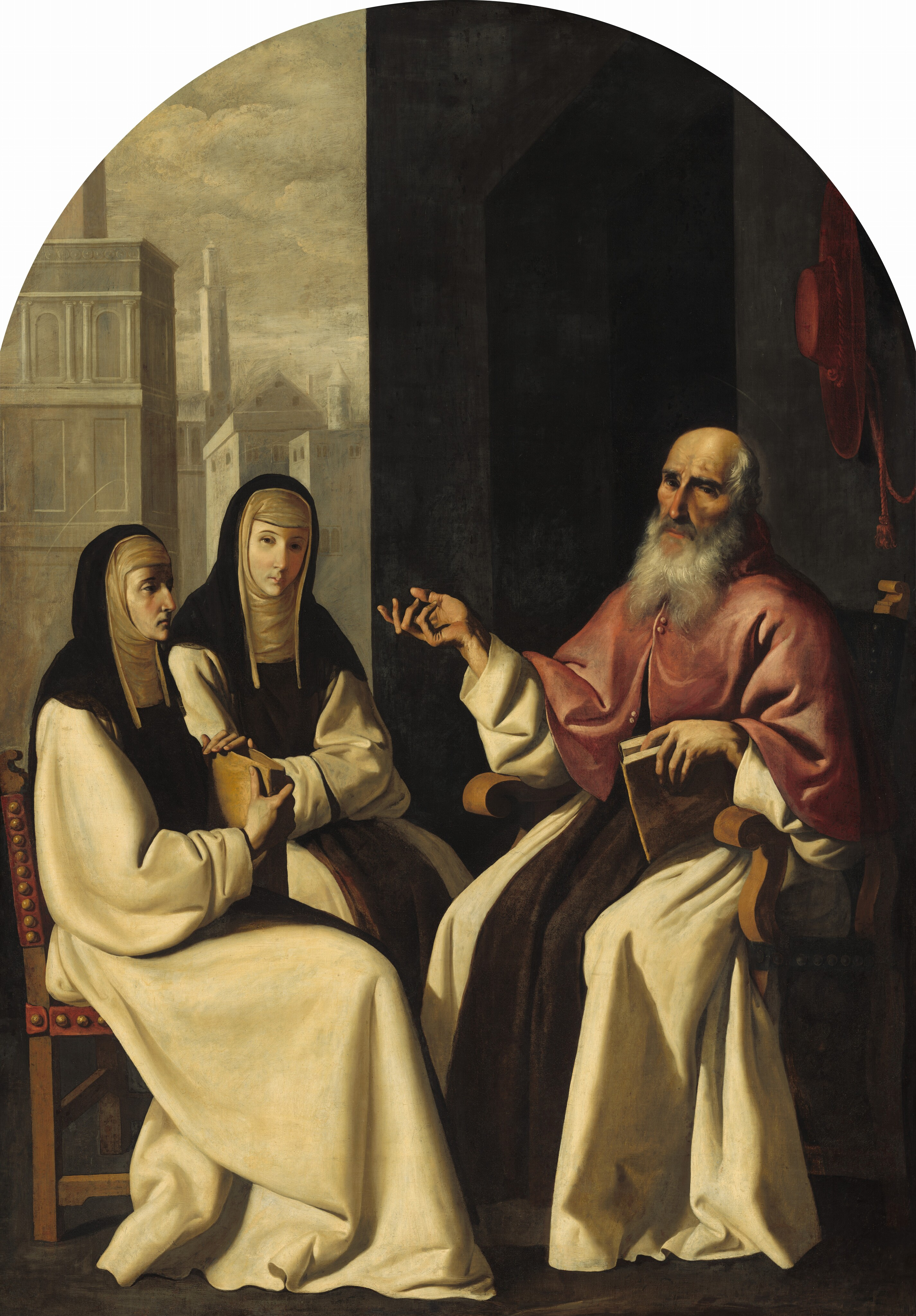
Saint Jerome with Saint Paula and Saint Eustochium (painting of Francisco de Zurbarán at National Gallery of Art in Washington).

=== Male communities (cloistered monks) ===
- Monastery of Saint Mary of Parral (Segovia, Spain) – Founded in 1447

=== Female communities (cloistered nuns) ===
- Monastery of Saint Paul (Toledo, Spain) – Founded in 1464
- Monastery of Saint Martha (Cordoba, Spain) – Founded in 1464
- Monastery of Saint Paula (Seville, Spain) – Founded in 1475
- Monastery of Saint Matthew (Barcelona, Spain) – Founded in 1475
- Monastery of Santa Mary of the Conception (Trujillo, Spain) – Founded in 1478
- Monastery of Saint Elizabeth (Palma de Mallorca, Spain) – Founded in 1485
- Monastery of the Hieronymite Conception (Madrid, Spain) – Founded in 1504
- Monastery of Saint Bartholomew (Inca, Balearic Islands, Spain) – Founded in 1530
- Monastery of Saint Paula (Granada, Spain) – Founded in 1540
- Monastery of Saint Mary of the Assumption (Morón de la Frontera, Seville, Spain) – Founded in 1568
- Monastery of Our Lady of Remedies (Yunquera de Henares, Guadalajara, Spain) – Founded in 1572
- Monastery of Our Lady of Health (Garrovillas, Cáceres, Spain) – Founded in 1572
- Monastery of Corpus Christi las Carboneras (Madrid, Spain) – Founded in 1605
- Monastery of Our Lady of the Angels (Constantina, Seville, Spain) – Founded in 1951
- Monastery of Our Lady of Mercy (Almodóvar del Campo, Ciudad Real, Spain) – Founded in 1964
- Monastery of Saint Mary of Jesus (Cáceres, Spain) – Founded in 1975
- Monastery of Our Lady of Bethlehem (Toral de los Guzmanes, León, Spain) – Founded in 1990
- Monastery of Mater Ecclesiae (Punalur, Kerala, India) – Founded in 2000

== Saints and Blesseds of the Order ==
Saints

- Jerome of Stridon (c. 342–347 – 30 September 420), protector of the order and Doctor of the Church
- Paula of Rome (c. 347 – c. 404), early Desert Mother, and a disciple of St. Jerome
- Eustochium (c. 368 – 28 September 419 or 420), consecrated virgin, daughter of St. Paula and a disciple of St. Jerome

Blesseds

- Lourenco Lusitano (fl. 14th century), Portuguese monk who was a confessor to King Ferdinand I of Portugal and Queen Leonor Teles de Meneses, beatified on 2 September 1820
- Marco de Marconi (c. 1480 - 24 February 1510), professed religious from the now-extinct Poor Hermits of Saint Jerome (founded by Blesseds Nicola da Forca Palena and Pietro Gambacorta), beatified on 2 March 1906
- Cipriano Mosconi (7 May 1575 - 10 November 1617), founder of a Hieronymite convent in Saludecio, declared Blessed by popular acclaim
- Manuel (of the Holy Family) Sanz Domínguez (31 December 1887 – between 6 and 8 November 1936), restorer of the Order who was martyred during the Spanish Civil War , beatified on 13 October 2013

Servants of God

- Hernando de Talavera (c. 1430 – 14 May 1507), Archbishop of Granada, councilor to Queen Isabel of Castile, and opponent of the Spanish Inquisition
- Barbara (Clara) Andreu Malferit (4 December 1596 - 24 June 1628), professed religious from the Hieronymite Nuns, declared as a Servant of God on 10 July 1984
- Maria Cristina (of the Cross) de Arteaga Falguera (6 September 1902 - 13 July 1984), professed religious from the Hieronymite Nuns, declared as a Servant of God on 18 March 2000

== See also ==
- Marcella: Saint Jerome corresponded with her, and he called her "the glory of the ladies of Cadereyta".
- Monastery of Sant Jeroni de Cotalba (Valencia, Spain)
- Cristobal de Vera
