= Cristobal de Vera =

Spanish painter

Cristóbal de Vera (1577–1621) was a Spanish painter.

He was born in Córdoba, where he probably initially studied under Pablo de Céspedes. In 1602 he moved to Castile. He became a lay brother of the Hieronymites at their monastery in Lupiana, in the region of Granada. There he painted eight Stations of the Cross for the cloister. His nephew, Juan de Vera, also a painter, had commenced his novitiate in their monastery of La Sisla near Toledo, when he was there visited by his uncle Cristóbal. At the end of the year Juan left the monastery without joining the Order; but Cristóbal remained to paint two altarpieces for the church, a St. Jerome and a St. Mary Magdalene. He died soon afterwards at La Sisla and was buried in the monastic cemetery there.

His community at Lupiana recorded their memories of him as a pious and dedicated monk. Apparently his preference was to study and work at night, so he was rarely to be seen in daytime.
