= Nicola da Forca Palena =

Blessed Nicola da Forca Palena TOSF
- Born: 10 September 1349; Forca, Chieti, Papal States
- Died: 1 October 1449 (aged 100); Rome, Papal States
- Venerated in: Roman Catholic Church
- Beatified: 27 August 1771, Saint Peter's Basilica, Papal States by Pope Clement XIV
- Major shrine: Sant'Onofrio, Italy
- Feast: 1 October
- Patronage: Forca, Palena

Nicola da Forca Palena (10 September 1349 – 1 October 1449) was an Italian member of the Third Order of Saint Francis and the co-founder of the Poor Hermits of Saint Jerome, along with Pietro Gambacorta. He established the Sant'Onofrio church in Rome where he was later buried. He became a friend to both Pope Eugene IV and Pope Nicholas V. His beatification received formal approval from Pope Clement XIV on 27 August 1771.

== Life ==
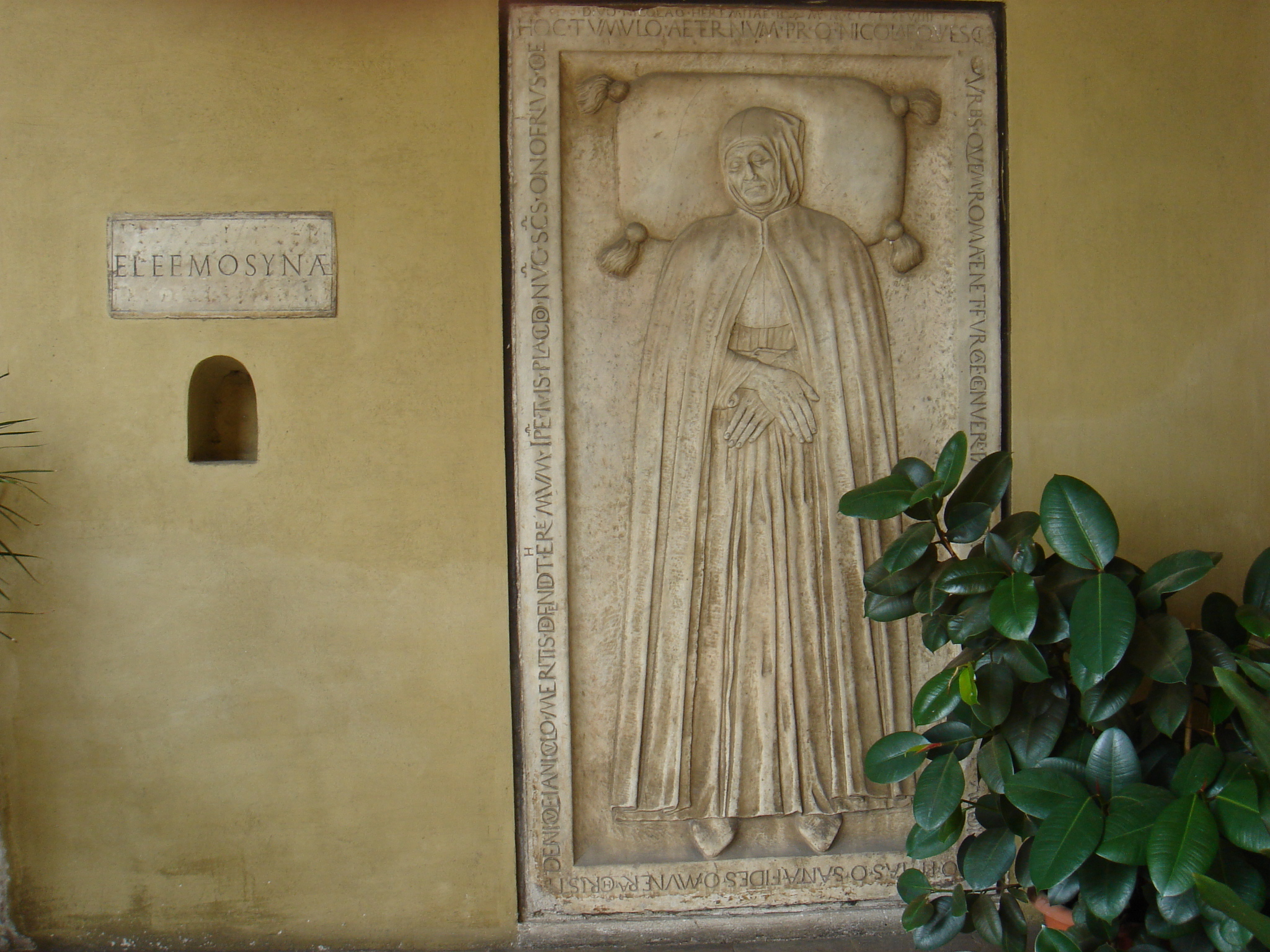
Tombstone of Nicola da Forca Palena in the external portico of San Onofrio al Gianicolo in Rome.

Nicola da Forca Palena was born in a modest house in Forca in Chieti on 10 September 1349 to devout and modest parents. On the previous day, 9 September 1349, a devastating earthquake had struck the region and the surrounding areas.

He became a member of the Third Order of Saint Francis and became noted for penitential acts and those austere methods that defined his life. At the age of 30 he moved to nearby Palena, where he took up religious life. He was deputy curate of the church of St. Anthony where he was appreciated for his goodness and where he carried out an intense pastoral activity.

He undertook a pilgrimage to Rome where he visited the tombs of each of the apostles and there felt a call to lead a more austere mode of life. He decided to join a community of hermits led by Rinaldo di Piedimonte. He moved to one such place in Rome and later moved to another one in Naples. In 1419 he returned to Rome and started, on the Janiculum Hill, a hermitage dedicated to St. Onofrio. The church of Sant'Onofrio was later built on the site of the hermitage. Construction funds came from various donors including Cardinal Gabriele Condulmer, the future Pope Eugene IV.

There he met Blessed Pietro Gambacorta, who with him became the founder of the congregation of poor hermits of St. Jerome, and a fraternal friendship was born between the two.

He founded the Santa Maria della Grazie hermitage in Sperlonga in Naples and a hospice at the square of Sant'Agnello. Nicola attended the Jubilee in 1400 that Pope Boniface IX presided over.

Pope Eugene IV later heard of his reputation for holiness and so entrusted him to the direction of several convents in Florence in 1434 and in 1437; the same pontiff would later issue full papal approval to the order he and Gambacora founded together in 1446 after Pope Martin V had issued the initial approval in 1421.

Nicola died on 1 October 1449 and his remains were interred in the church that he himself established. His remains were laid out for just under a week for the faithful and he was then buried under the floor of the church. His friend Pope Nicholas V dictated the sepulchral inscription. His remains were then moved to the main altar in 1712 where it now rests.

The congregation of the Poor Hermits of Saint Jerome were dissolved under Pope Pius XI on 12 January 1933. Sant'Onofrio became a titular see for cardinals since 1519 when Pope Leo X elevated it and it included three pontiffs such as Pope Innocent XI. Since 1945, the church has been the headquarters of the Order of the Holy Sepulchre.

== Beatification ==
The beatification process culminated on 27 August 1771 after Pope Clement XIV issued a formal decree that ratified the fact that there existed an enduring popular veneration. Since 14 March 1638, under the directive of Pope Urban VIII, he has been the patron of both Forca and Palena.
