= Monastery of Corpus Christi las Carboneras =

- Monasterio del Corpus Christi las Carboneras (Spanish)
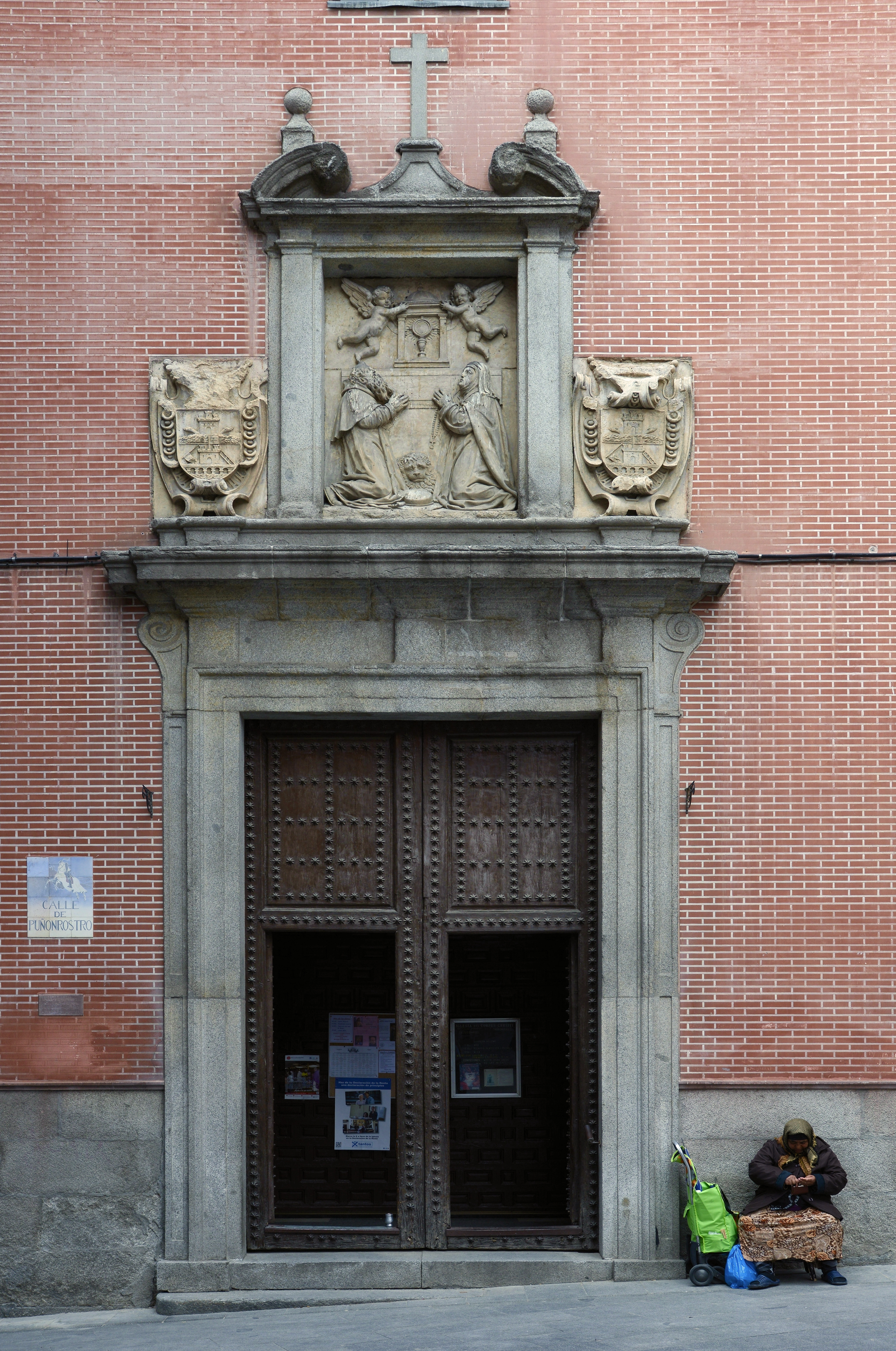

- Location within Spain
- 40.414798°N 3.709825°W
- Location: Plaza del Conde de Miranda, 3, 28005 Madrid, Spain

Site notes
- Architect: Miguel de Soria
- Architectural style: Spanish Baroque architecture

Spanish Cultural Heritage
- Official name: Monasterio del Corpus Christi las Carboneras
- Type: Non-movable
- Criteria: Monument
- Designated: 1981
- Reference no.: RI-51-0004500

The Monastery of Corpus Christi las Carboneras (Spanish: Monasterio del Corpus Christi las Carboneras) is a monastery of a female community of the Order of Saint Jerome located in Madrid, Spain at the Plaza del Conde de Miranda. It was founded in 1607 by the widowed countess of Castellar and Hieronymite nun Beatriz Ramírez de Mendoza (1556-1626). It is named after a painting of the Virgin of the Immaculate Conception that was found in a coalyard (Spanish: carbonería). The complex was built by the master builder Miguel de Soria, a pupil of Juan Gómez de Mora, in the first quarter of the 17th century. It was declared Bien de Interés Cultural in 1981. The monastery is vending sweet pastries (Spanish: dulces).

The church is an example of the early Baroque in Madrid. It has a single nave consisting of three bays with niches covered by a barrel vault with lunettes. Its choir is elevated.

== Reredoses ==
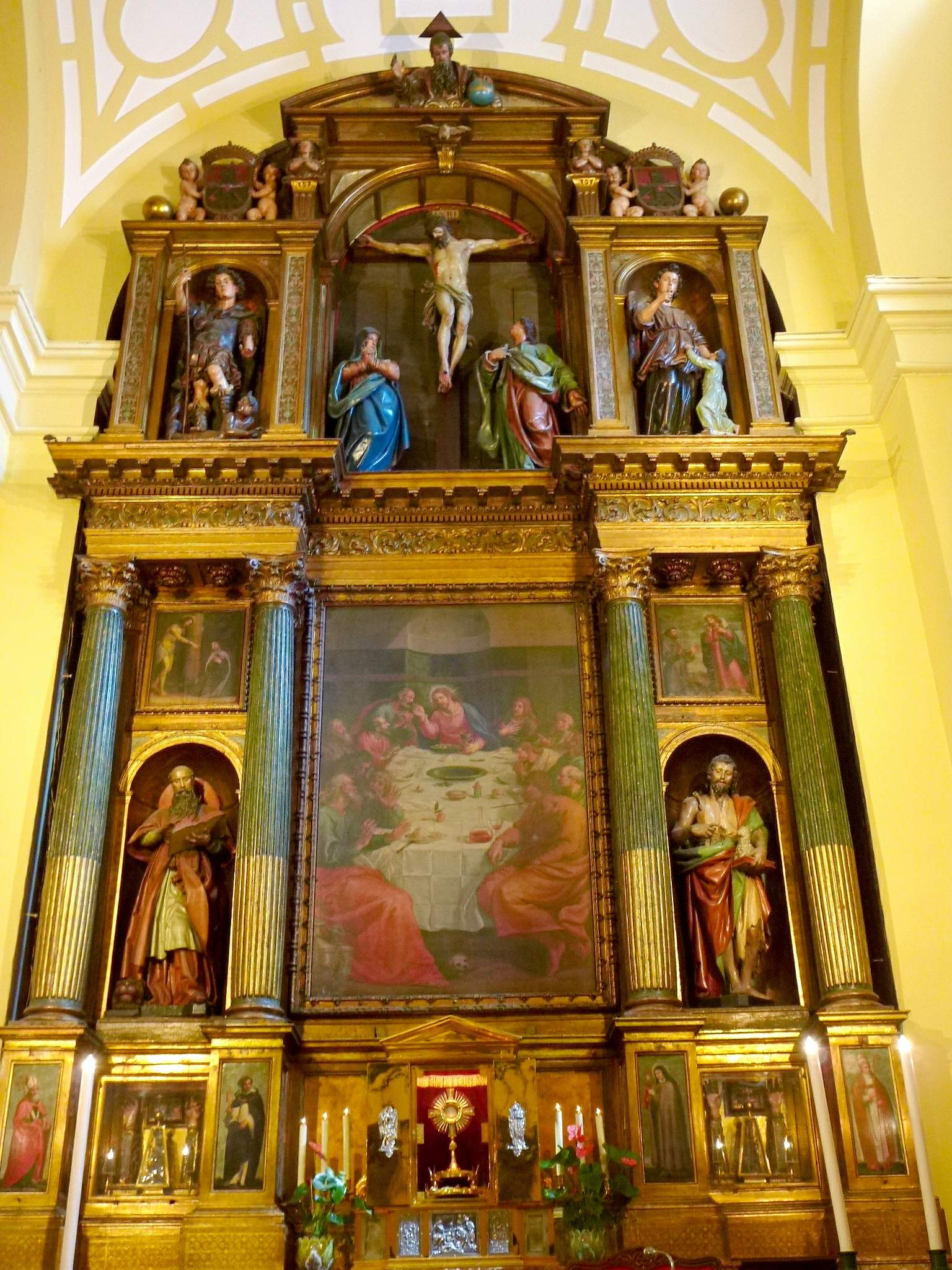
The main reredos of the monastery's church

The architecture and sculptures of the main reredos of the monastery's church are a work by Antón de Morales (ca. 1559-after 1625) from 1622. Its paintings are by Vicente Carducho. The predella (or Spanish banco) shows from left to right paintings of the Saints Augustine, Anne, Dominic, Joachim, Clare, Joseph, Gregory, Lawrence and Stephen, the paintings. The main horizontal division (or Spanish cuerpo) shows in its central vertical division (or Spanish calle) Carducci's painting Last Supper. The left calle contains a statue of Saint Jerome and above it a small painting with Saint Teresa of Ávila in front of the flagellated Christ; the right calle a statue of Saint John the Baptist and above it a small painting with Saint Francis of Assisi and the Good Shepherd.

There are two other retables on the wall sections of the main arch that separates the nave from the presbytery. The creators of their paintings aren't known with certainty. The authorship of Vincenzo Carducci has sometimes been considered.

The retable on the right wall section shows a painting of Saint Paula admiring Christ Child; the banco paintings of a holy martyr, the Resurrection and Saint Agnes; the attic a painting of the Virgin of the Immaculate Conception.

The retable on the left wall section shows a painting of Saint Jerome as penitent in the desert; the banco paintings of Saint John the Baptist, the Ascension and Saint Sebastian; the attic a painting of the Annunciation.

The last bay on the Epistle side houses the retable of Saint Anthony of Padua with wood carvings in the style of Pedro de la Torre.

== Literature ==
- Pérez Sánchez, Alfonso (2002). "Iglesia del convento de religiosas jerónimas del Corpus Christi". Retablos de la Comunidad de Madrid: siglos XV a XVIII (PDF) (in Spanish) (2nd ed.). pp. 227–231. ISBN 978-84-451-1011-9. OCLC 34112985. OL 935602M. Wikidata Q108473124.
- Osorio García de Oteyza, Carlos (May 2019), Iglesias de Madrid (in Spanish) (3rd ed.), Ediciones La Librería, pp. 78–81, Wikidata Q108437164
