= Sant'Onofrio, Rome =

Sant'Onofrio
- Church of Saint Onuphrius on the Janiculum
- Chiesa di Sant'Onofrio al Gianicolo
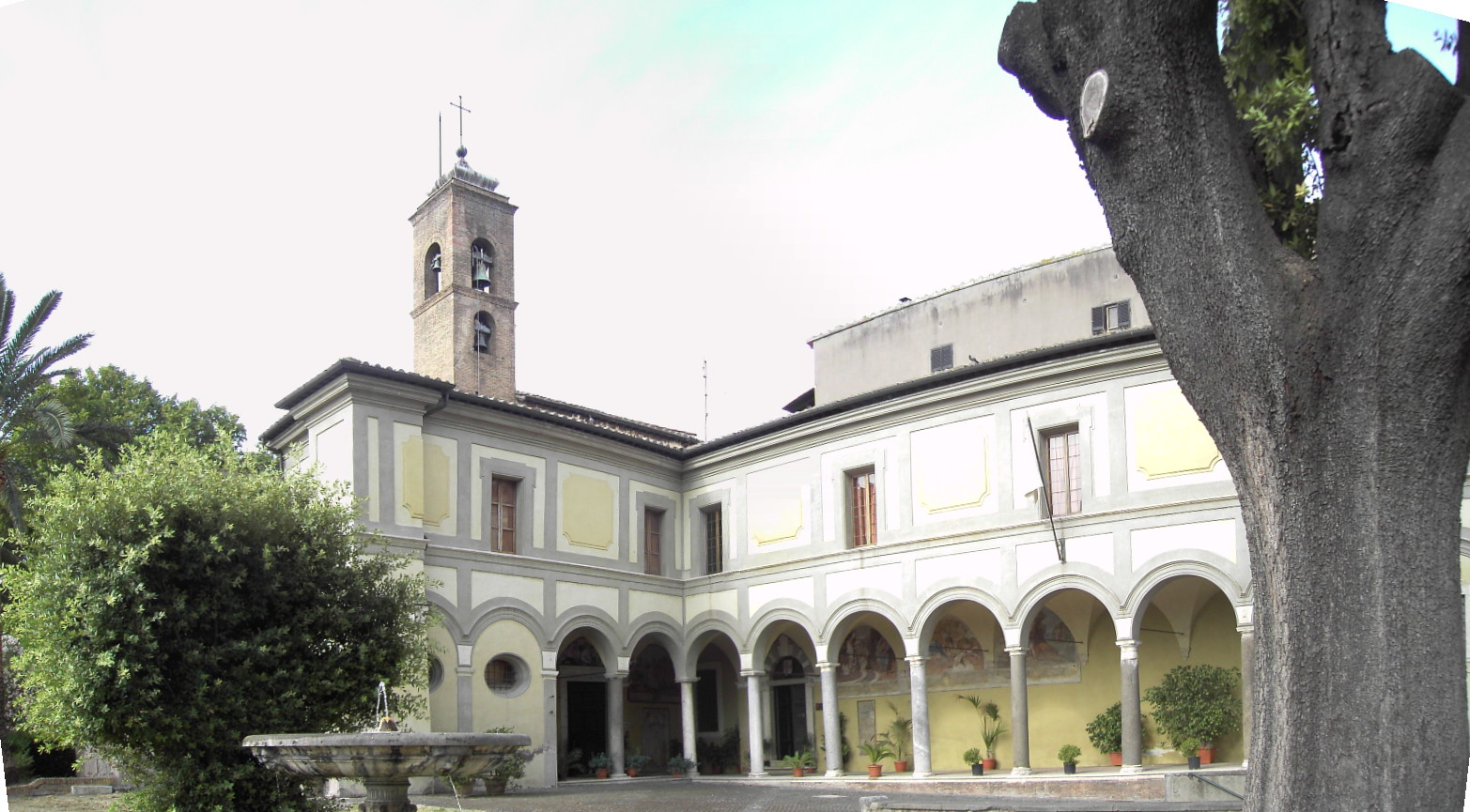
- Click on the map for a fullscreen view
- 41°53′50″N 12°27′41″E
- Location: Piazza di Sant'Onofrio 2, Rome
- Country: Italy
- Language: Italian
- Denomination: Catholic
- Tradition: Roman Rite
- Religious order: Society of the Atonement

History
- Status: titular church
- Founded: 1439
- Dedication: Onuphrius

Architecture
- Architectural type: Renaissance
- Completed: 1620

Administration
- Diocese: Rome

Sant'Onofrio al Gianicolo - lat. Onuphrius Ianiculi - is a titular church in Trastevere, Rome. It is the official church of the papal order of knighthood Order of the Holy Sepulchre. A side chapel is dedicated to the Order and a former grand master, Nicola Canali is entombed there. It is located on the Janiculum. Since 1946, the church has been under the care of the American congregation of the Franciscan Friars of the Atonement.

== History ==
The monastery was built around 1439 on the site of a hermitage founded two decades earlier by Nicola da Forca Palena and is dedicated is to St Onuphrius, a 4th century Egyptian hermit. The attached cloister was added in the mid-15th century.

The "Salita di Sant'Onofrio", a rather steep driveway to the monastery, was used as a location for the 1958 film Big Deal on Madonna Street.

Cardinal Pierbattista Pizzaballa is the current Cardinal-Priest.

== Architecture ==
Behind the Renaissance portico are three lunettes by Domenichino, painted in 1605, commemorating the hermits who lived here and depicting scenes from the life of St Jerome. The fountain in the center of the churchyard was assembled from salvage partly from the destroyed Piazza Giudia’s fountain. When the latter was re-created as the Fontana di Piazza della Cinque Scole, the one at the monastery was given modern bits to replace those taken back. The original tomb slab of the founder, Blessed Nicholas of Forca Palena, is on the wall to the right of the church entrance.

== Interior ==
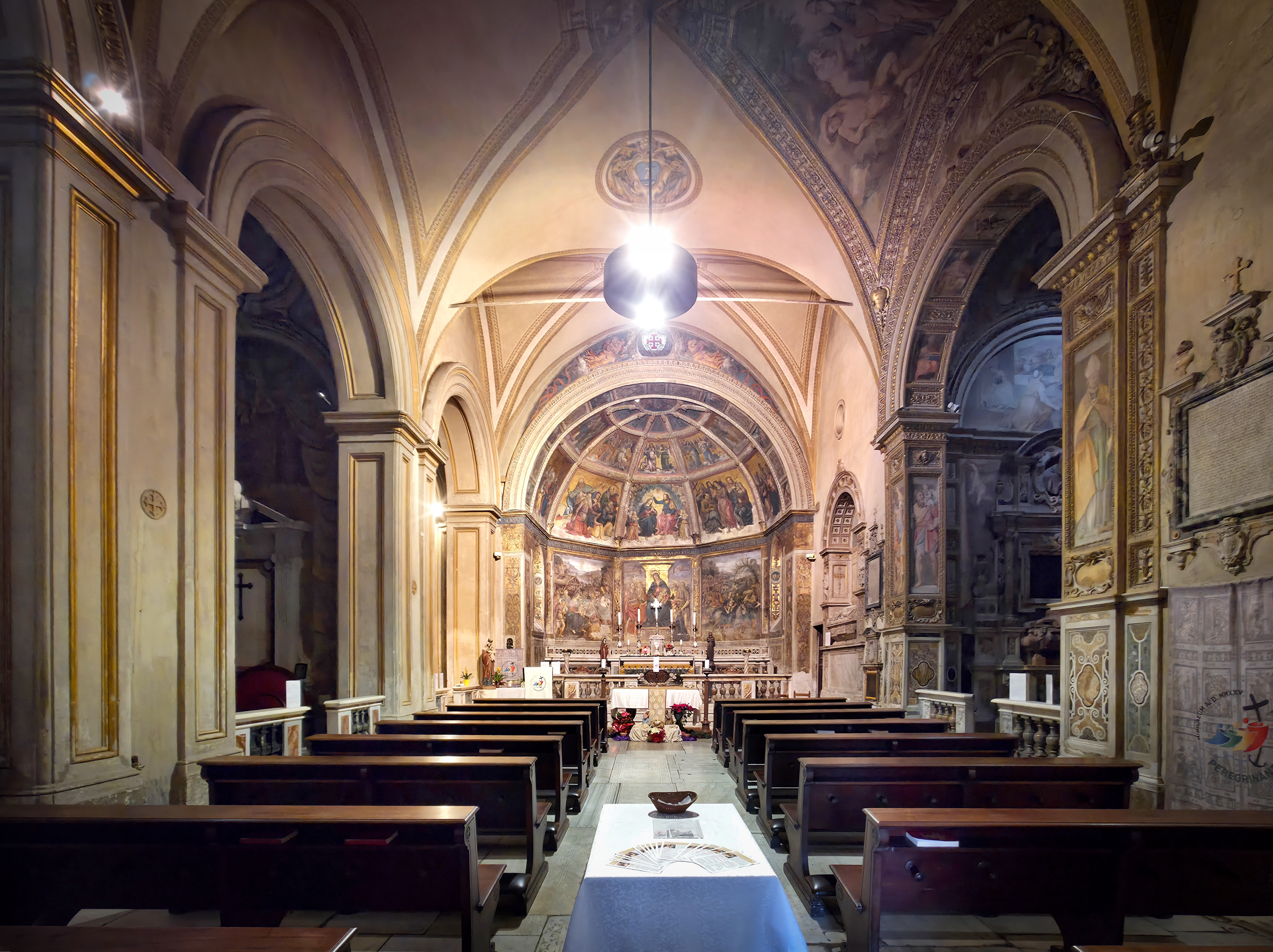
Vaulted Renaissance nave

The church has a single cross-vaulted nave with five chapels. The church also contains an altarpiece, The Madonna of Loreto by Agostino Carracci, (his only work in a church in Rome) and frescoes in the apse of Scenes from the Life of Mary, attributed to Baldassare Peruzzi.

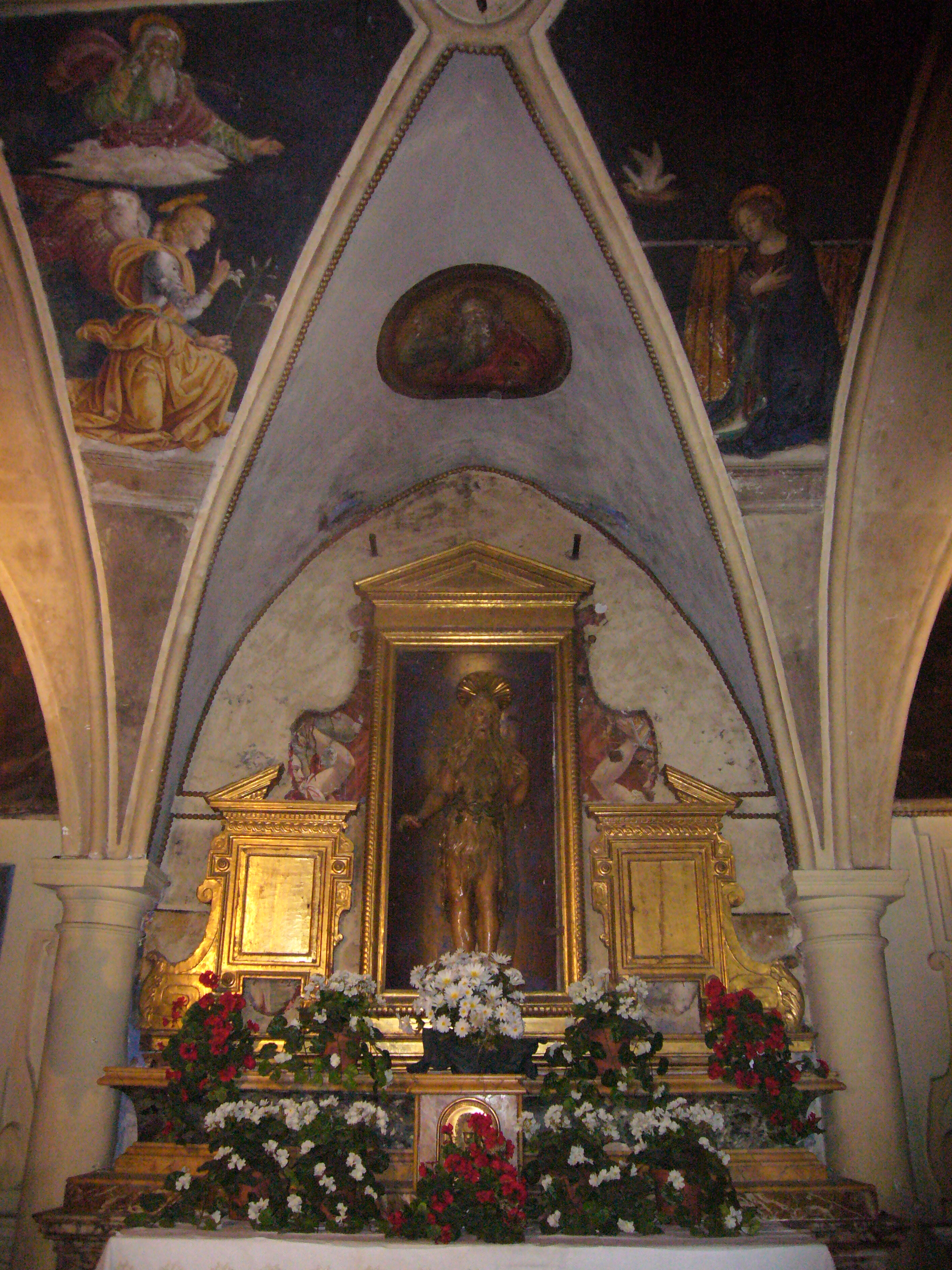
Annunciazione di Antoniazzo Romano

Next to the main altar is a Monument to Giovanni Sacco attributed to the school of Andrea Bregno with frescoes of St. Anne Teaching the Virgin to Read by a painter of the Umbrian school.

- The first chapel to the right has an Annunciation by Antoniazzo Romano and an Eternal Father attributed to Baldassarre Peruzzi.
- The second chapel has frescoes and stuccoes (1605) by Giovanni Battista Ricci with an altarpiece of the Madonna di Loreto by pupils of Annibale Carracci.
- In the first chapel to the left, is a monument to Torquato Tasso (1857) by Giuseppe De Fabris.
- In the second chapel is a Trinity fresco on the ceiling by Francesco Trevisani.
- In the third chapel on the left, is a monument of the Cardinal-Priest Filippo Sega with a portrait by Domenichino.

The sacristy ceiling has frescoes by Girolamo Pesci, while the walls have a Peter of Pisa by Francesco Trevisani. The cloister, which is perhaps the oldest part of the complex, has frescoes by the Cavaliere d'Arpino (Giuseppe Cesari) and others depicting scenes from the life of Saint Onuphrius.

== List of Cardinal-Priests ==
=== Diaconia ===
- Giovanni di Lorena (7 January 1519 - 10 May 1550 deceased)
- Innocenzo Ciocchi del Monte (1 September 1550 - 4 May 1562 appointed cardinal deacon of San Callisto)
- Ludovico Madruzzo (4 May 1562 - 1 October 1586 appointed cardinal presbyter of Sant'Anastasia)

=== Title of Cardinal ===
- Philippe de Lenoncourt (15 January 1588 - 13 December 1592 died)
- Filippo Sega (5 December 1594 - 29 May 1596 died)
- Flaminio Piatti (10 June 1596 - 24 April 1600 appointed cardinal presbyter of Santa Maria della Pace)
- Vacant title (1600 - 1604)
- Domenico Toschi (25 July 1604 - 5 May 1610 appointed cardinal presbyter of San Pietro in Montorio)
- Maffeo Barberini (5 May 1610 - 6 August 1623, elected pope with the name of Urban VIII)
- Francesco Barberini, deaconry pro hac vice (20 November 1623 - 13 November 1624 appointed Cardinal Deacon of Sant'Agata dei Goti alla Suburra)
- Antonio Barberini, O.F.M.Cap. (13 November 1624 - 7 September 1637 appointed Cardinal Priest of San Pietro in Vincoli)
- Vacant Title (1637 - 1645)
- Orazio Giustiniani, C.O. (24 April 1645 - 25 July 1649 deceased)
- Vacant title (1649 - 1652)
- Giovanni Girolamo Lomellini (12 March 1652 - 4 April 1659 deceased)
- Benedetto Odescalchi (21 April 1659 - 21 September 1676 elected Pope with the name of Innocent XI)
- Piero de Bonzi (19 October 1676 - 19 October 1689 appointed cardinal presbyter of San Pietro in Vincoli)
- Wilhelm Egon von Fürstenberg (14 November 1689 - 10 April 1704 deceased)
- Vacant title (1704 - 1707)
- Orazio Filippo Spada (21 March 1707 - 28 June 1724 deceased)
- Vincenzo Petra (20 December 1724 - 11 February 1737 appointed Cardinal Priest of San Pietro in Vincoli)
- Vacant title (1737 - 1744)
- Francesco Landi (15 June 1744 - 13 September 1745 appointed Cardinal Priest of San Giovanni a Porta Latina)
- Vacant title (1745 - 1749)
- Giovanni Battista Mesmer (22 September 1749 - 20 June 1760 died)
- Vacant title (1760 - 1773)
- Giovanni Angelo Braschi (10 May 1773 - 15 February 1775 elected Pope with the name of Pius VI)
- Marcantonio Marcolini (28 July 1777 - 18 June 1782 died)
- Vacant title (1782 - 1794)
- Giovanni Battista Caprara Montecuccoli (21 February 1794 - 21 June 1810 deceased)
- Vacant title (1810 - 1816)
- Giovanni Battista Zauli (29 April 1816 - 21 July 1819 deceased)
- Vacant title (1819 - 1836)
- Luigi Frezza (21 November 1836 - 14 October 1837 deceased)
- Giuseppe Mezzofanti (15 February 1838 - 15 March 1849 deceased)
- Vacant title (1849 - 1852)
- Carlo Luigi Morichini (18 March 1852 - 12 March 1877 appointed Cardinal Bishop of Albano)
- Francesco Saverio Apuzzo (20 March 1877 - 30 July 1880 deceased)
- Vacant title (1880 - 1894)
- Domenico Svampa (21 May 1894 - 10 August 1907 deceased)
- Pierre Andrieu (19 December 1907 - 15 February 1935 deceased)
- Emmanuel Célestin Suhard (19 December 1935 - 30 May 1949 deceased)
- Vacant title (1949 - 1958)
- José Garibi y Rivera (18 December 1958 - 17 May 1972 deceased)
- Pio Taofinu'u, S.M. (5 March 1973 - 19 January 2006 deceased)
- Carlo Furno (10 May 2006 - 9 December 2015 deceased)
- Vacant title (2015 - 2023)c
- Pierbattista Pizzaballa, O.F.M., from 30 September 2023

== Burials ==
- Blessed Nicola da Forca Palena
- Cardinal Filippo Sega
- Cardinal Luigi Frezza
- Archbishop Lorenzo Vitturi, his funeral monument is above the entrance door.
- Poet Torquato Tasso

== Tasso ==
Torquato Tasso, the author of Gerusalemme Liberata, the epic poem that retells the deeds of the crusaders who fought to regain possession of the Holy Sepulchre, requested and obtained shelter at the monastery of Sant'Onofrio after wandering all over Italy. He spent the last years of his life there, dying in the cloister on 25 April 1595, the evening before he was to be crowned with laurels on the Capitoline Hill. The monastery houses a collection of manuscripts and editions of his work, as well as his death mask, in the Museo Tassiano.

== Gallery ==
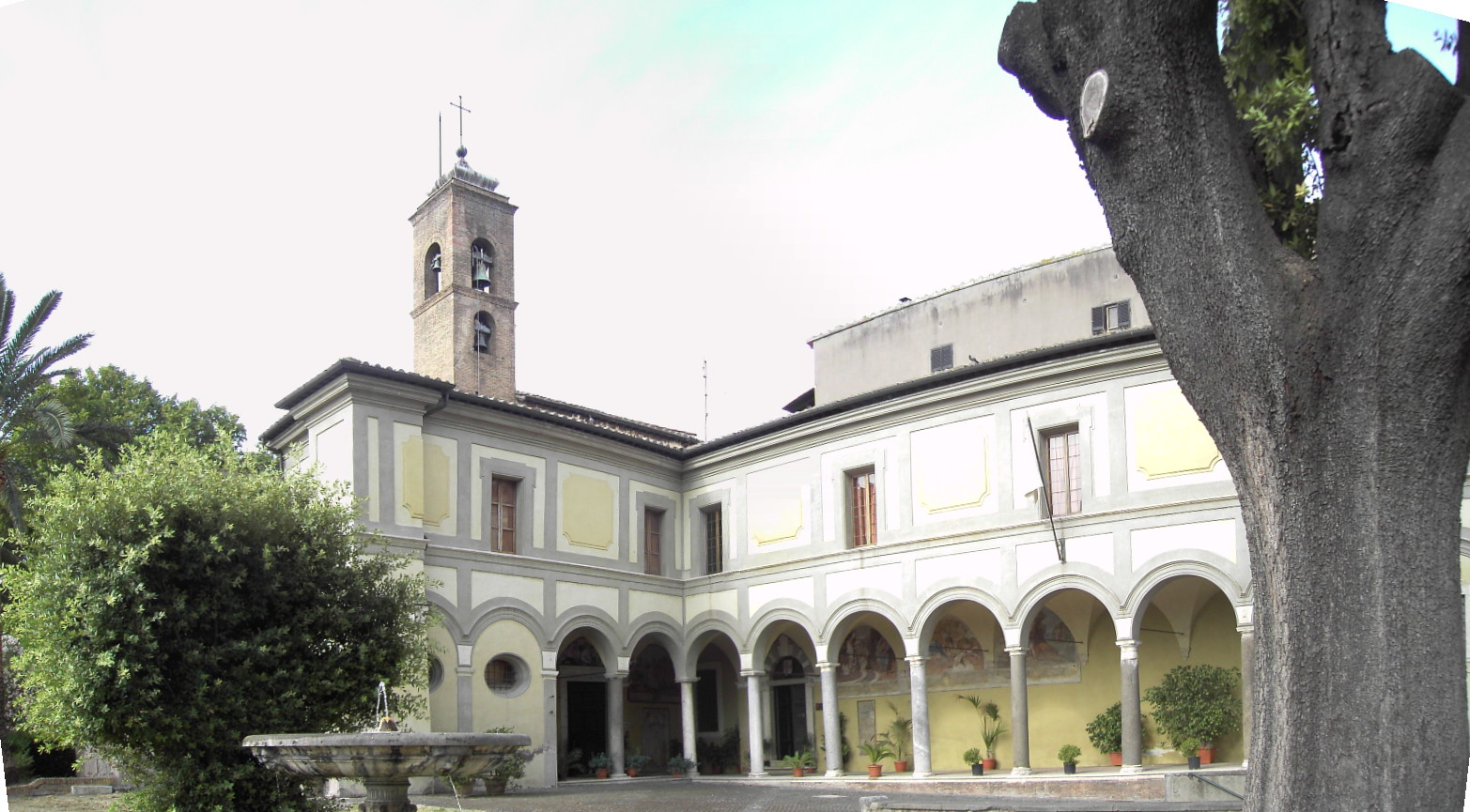
Convent of Sant'Onofrio

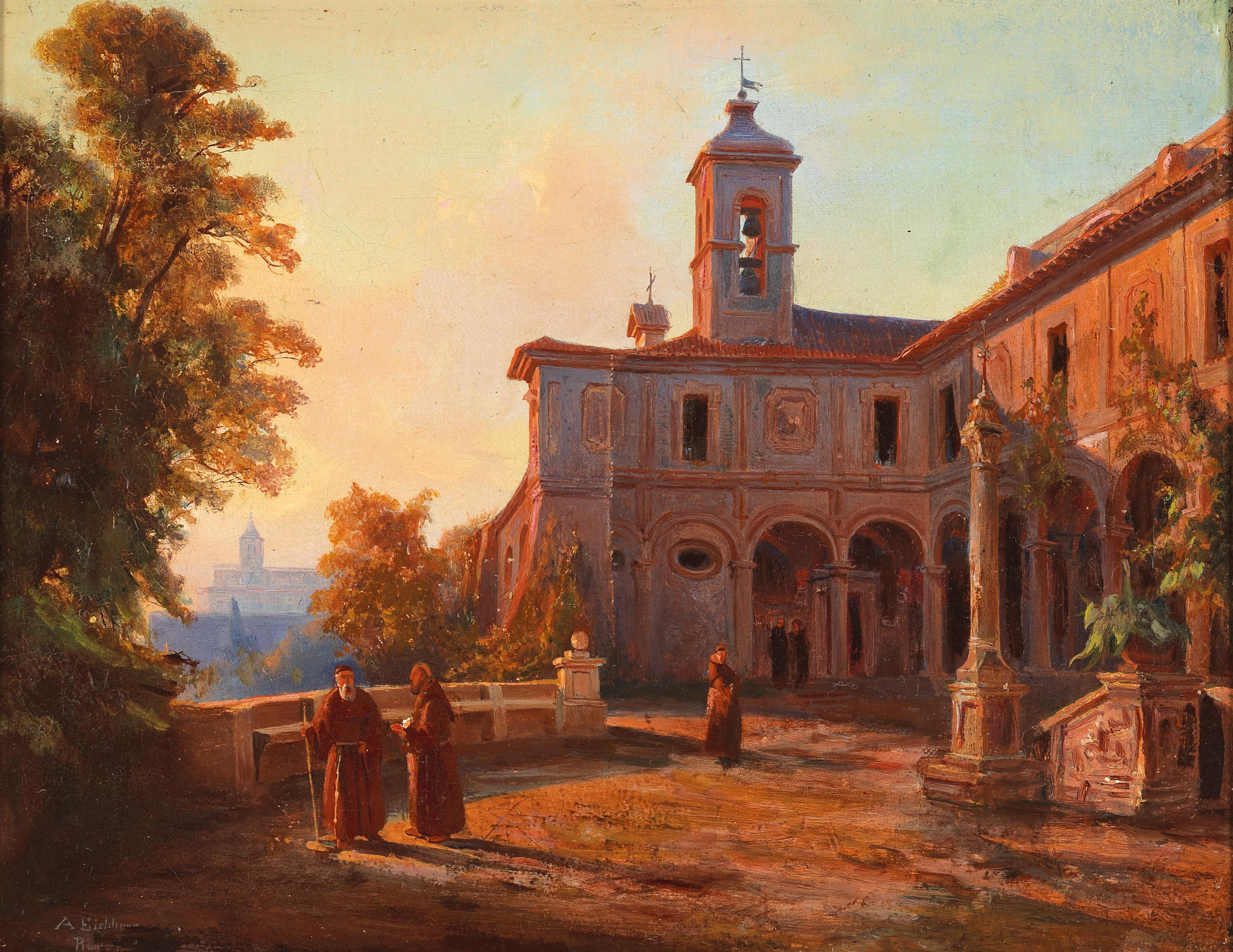
Sant'Onofrio painted by Albert Eichhorn (before 1851)

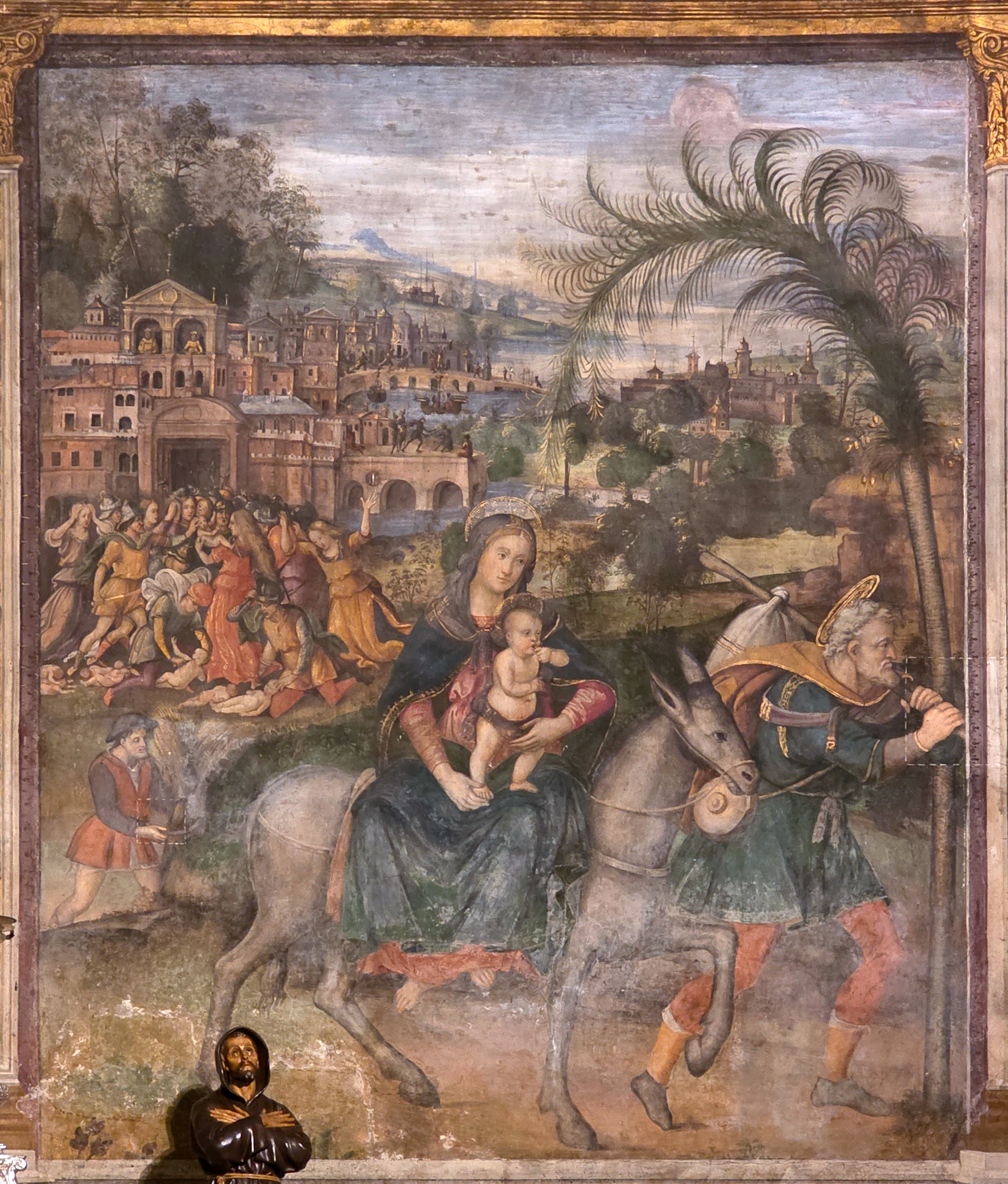
The Flight to Egypt by Baldassarre Peruzzi in the main apse.

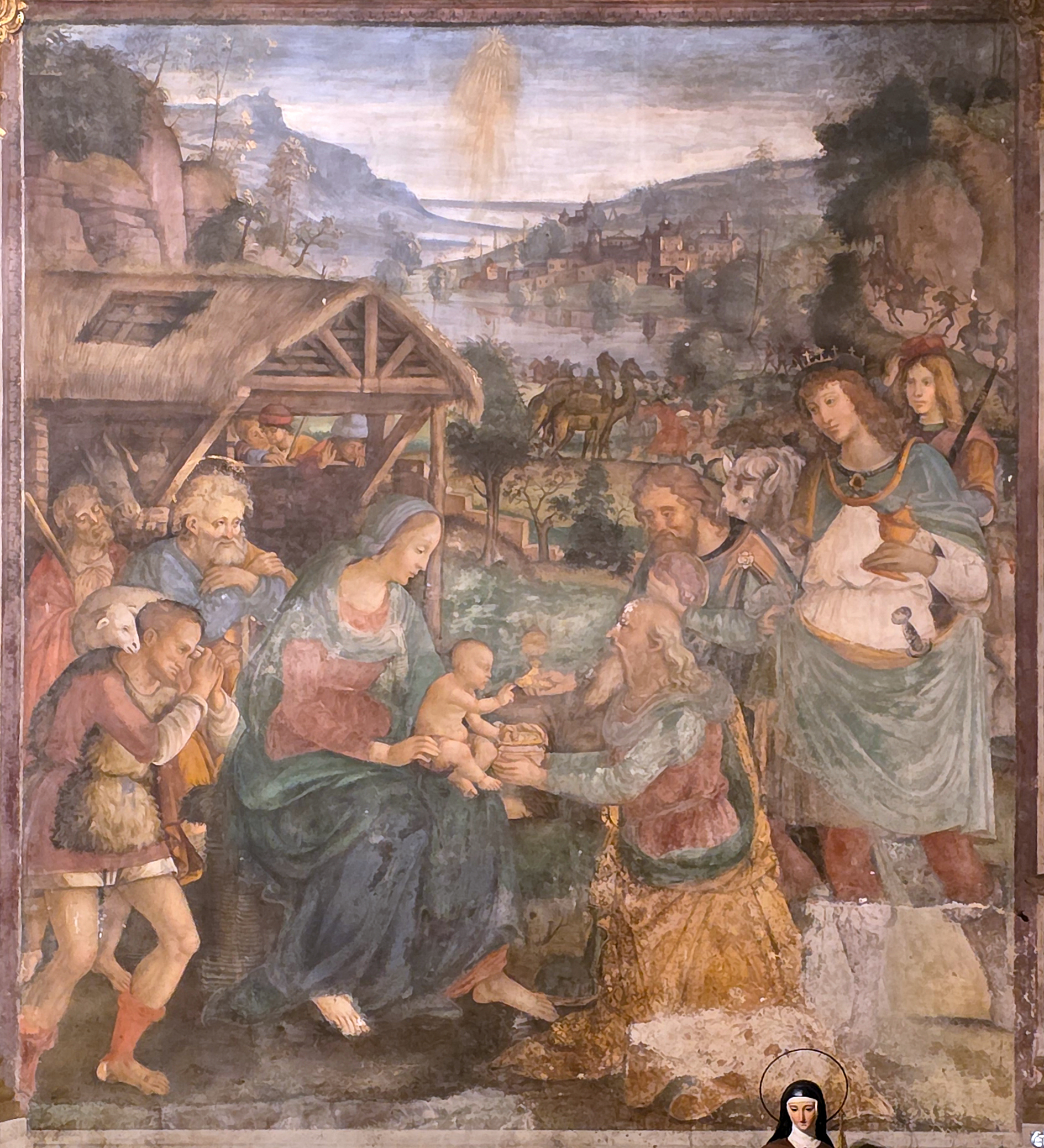
Nativity by Baldassarre Peruzzi in the main apse

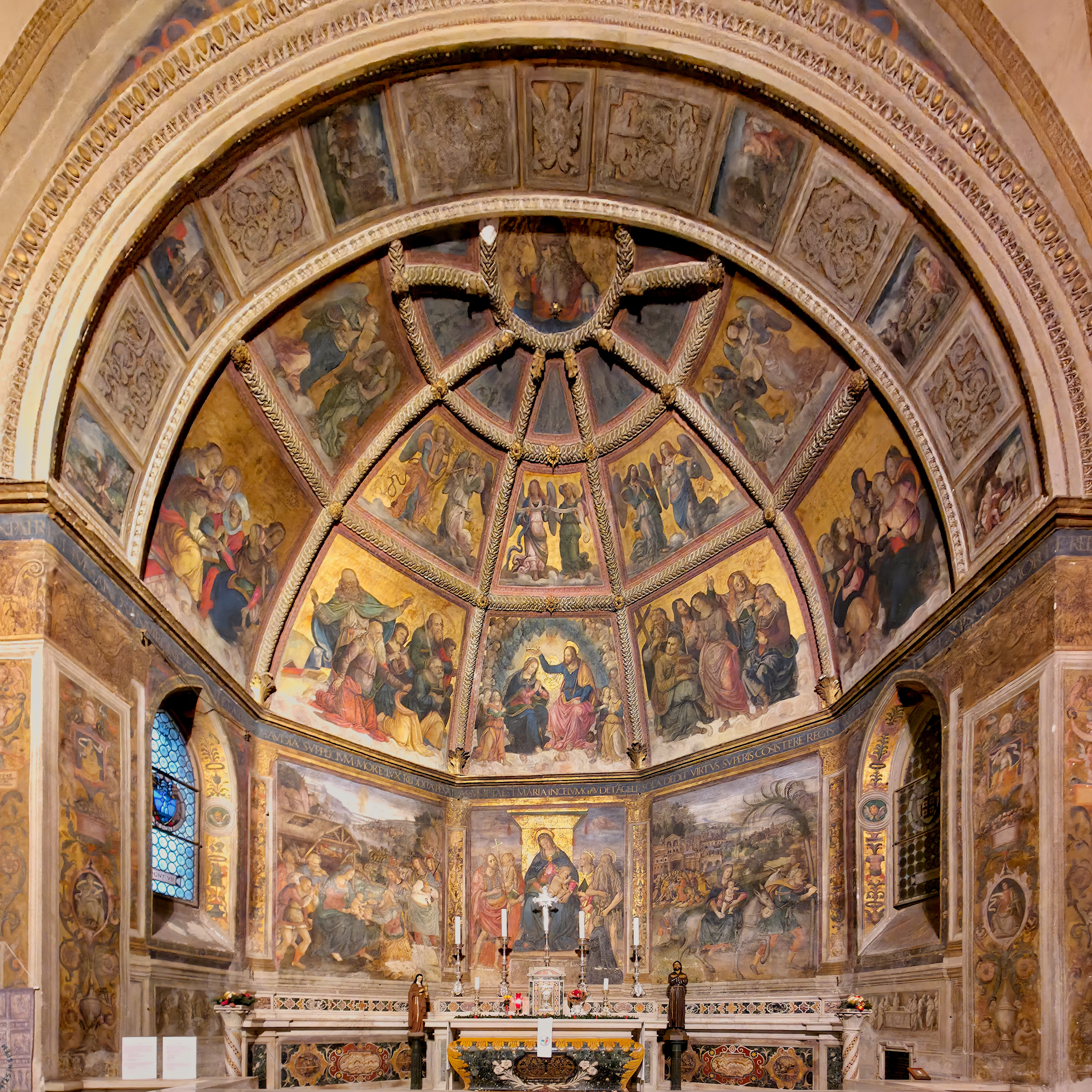
Main Apse with paintings by Baldassarre Peruzzi

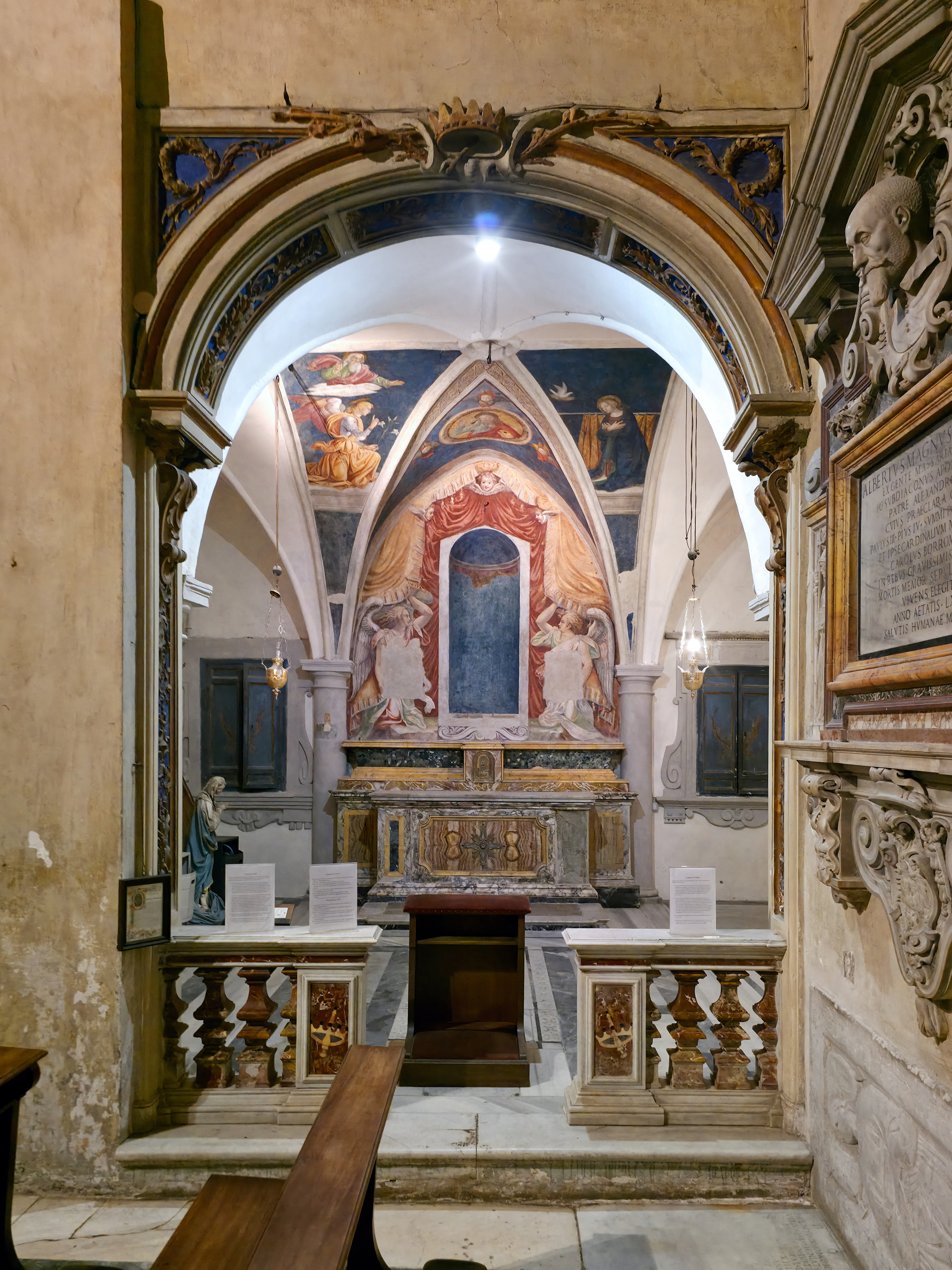
Late Gothic chapel with paintings by Antoniazzo Romano and Baldassarre Peruzzi

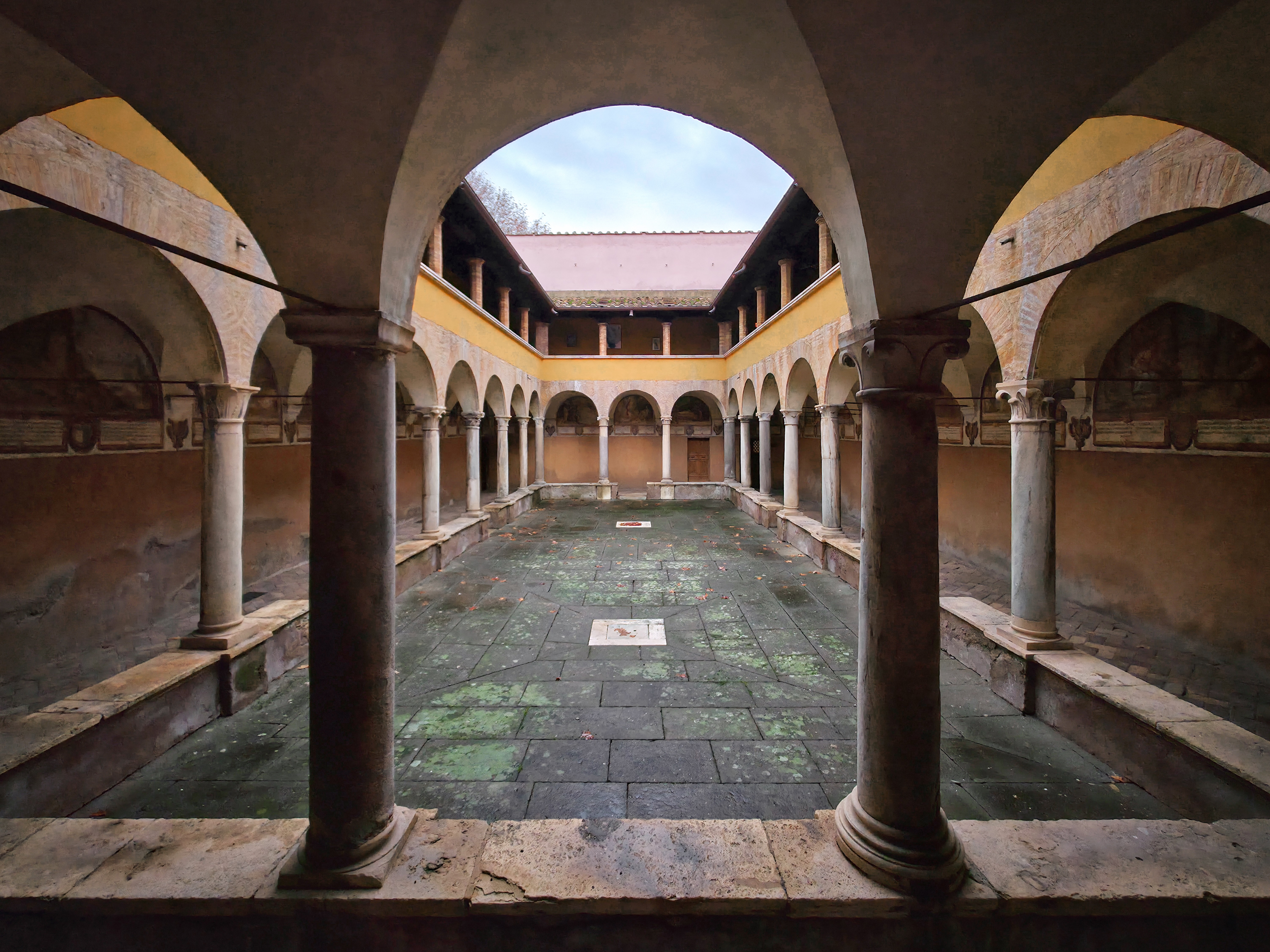
Mid 15th c. cloister

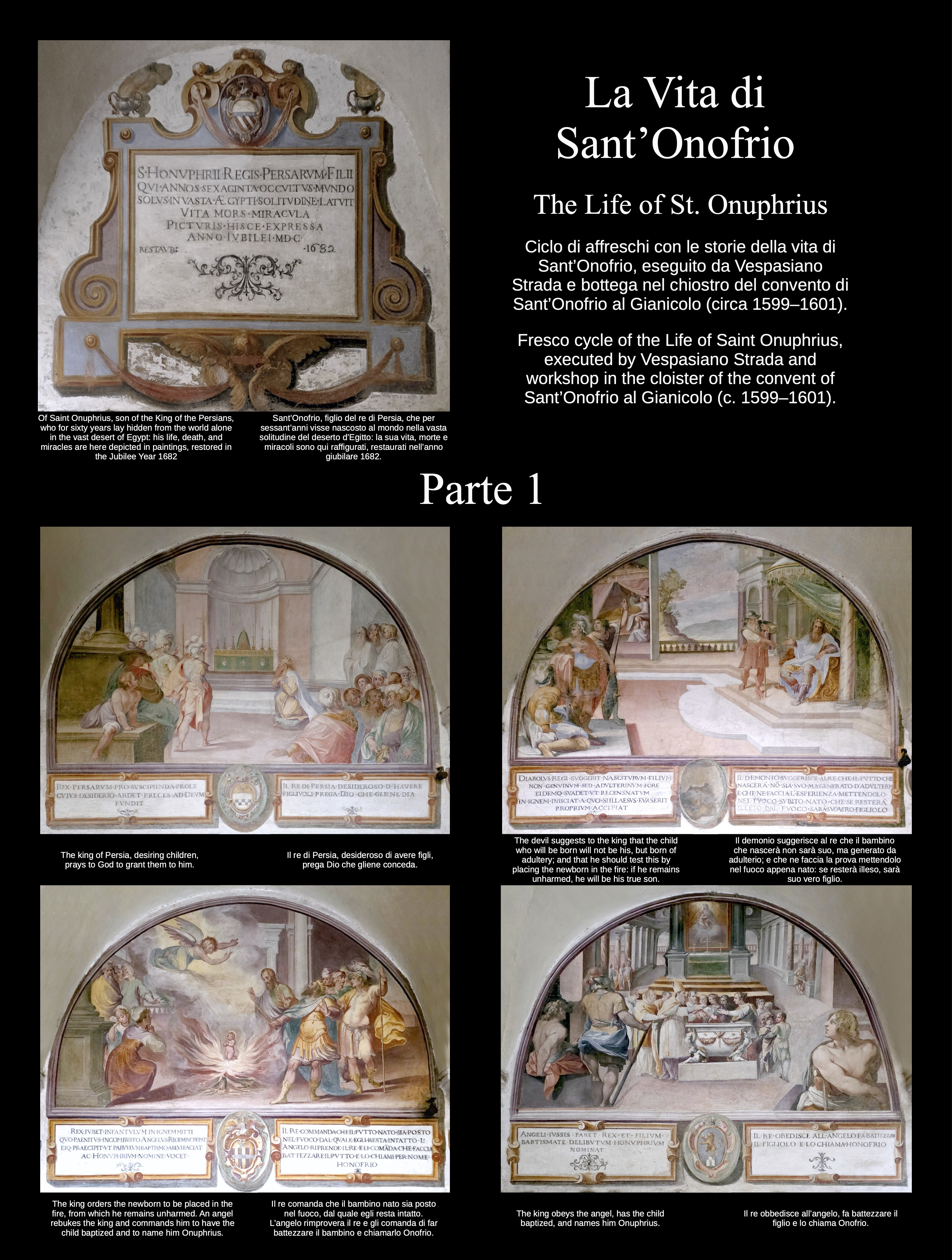
Cloister Lunettes illustrating the Life of Saint Onuphrius Part 1

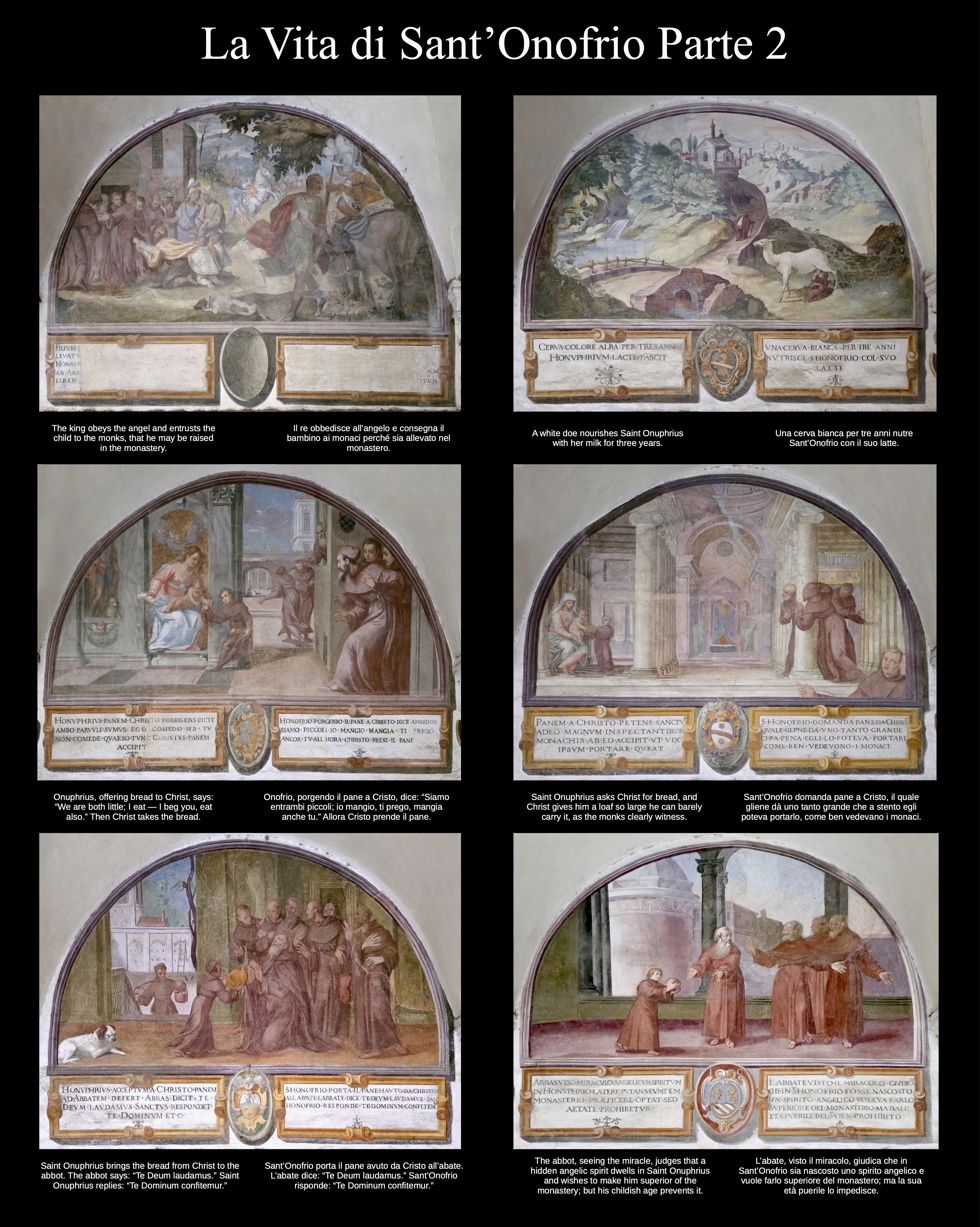
Cloister Lunettes illustrating the Life of Saint Onuphrius Part 2

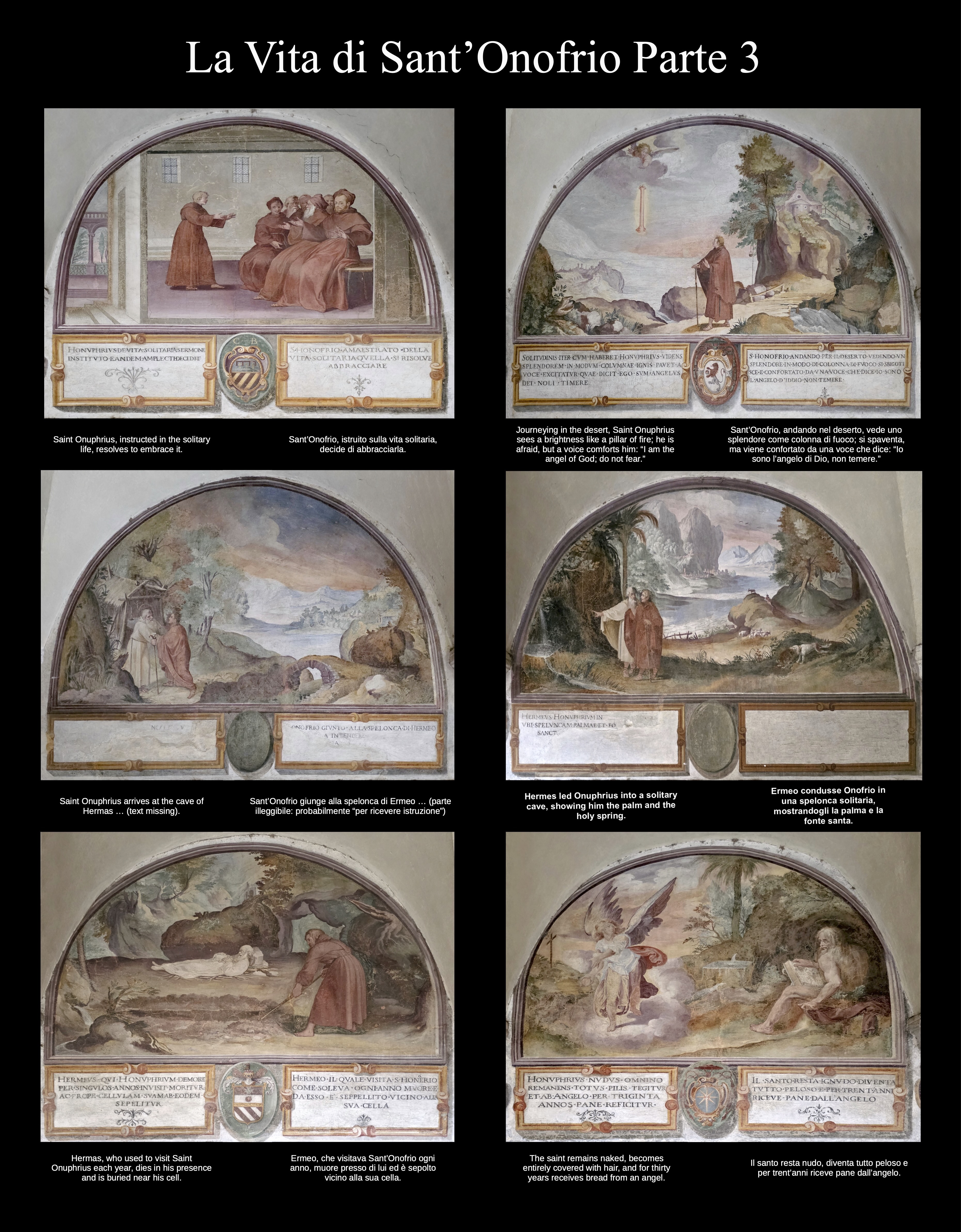
Cloister Lunettes illustrating the Life of Saint Onuphrius Part 3

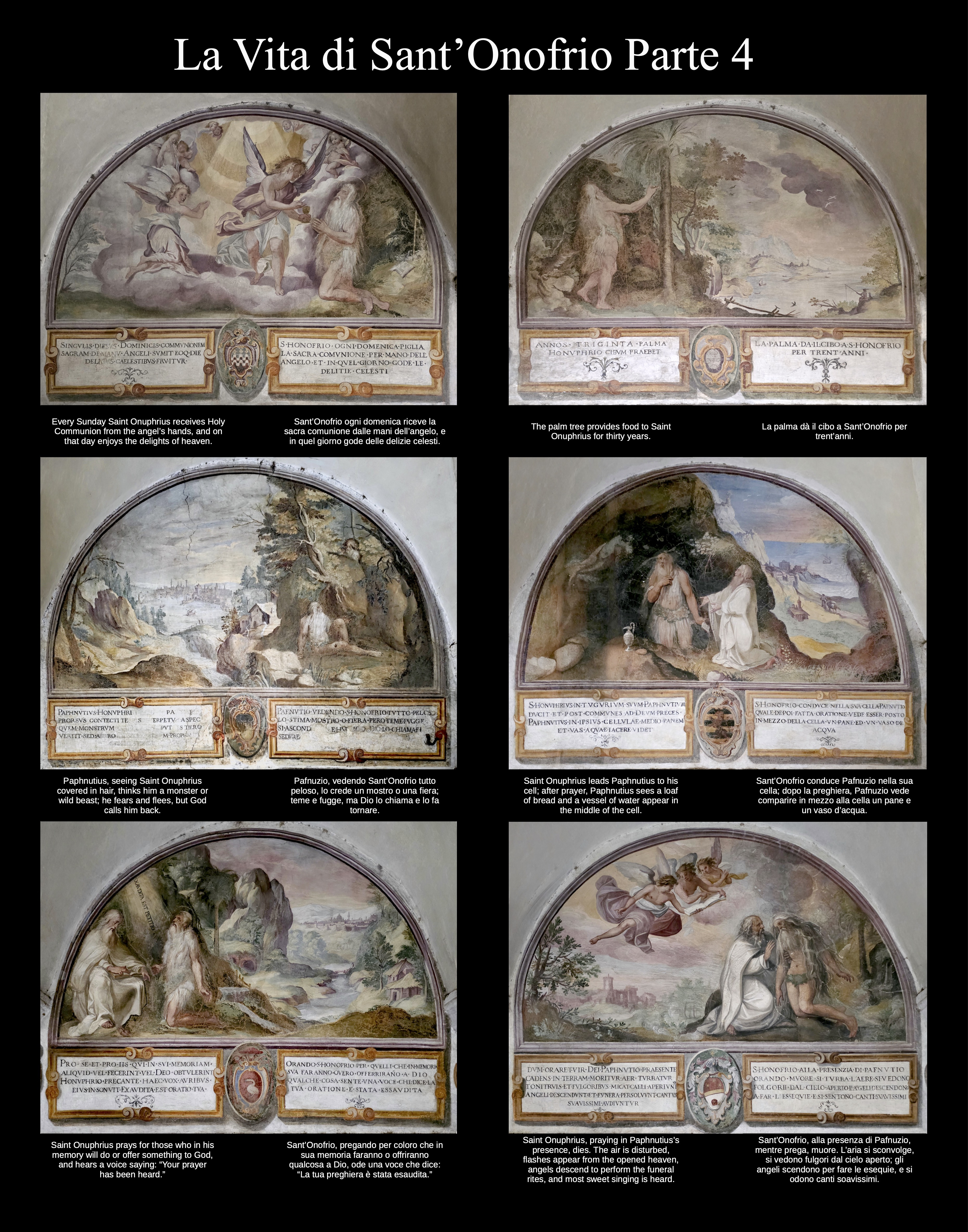
Cloister Lunettes illustrating the Life of Saint Onuphrius Part 4

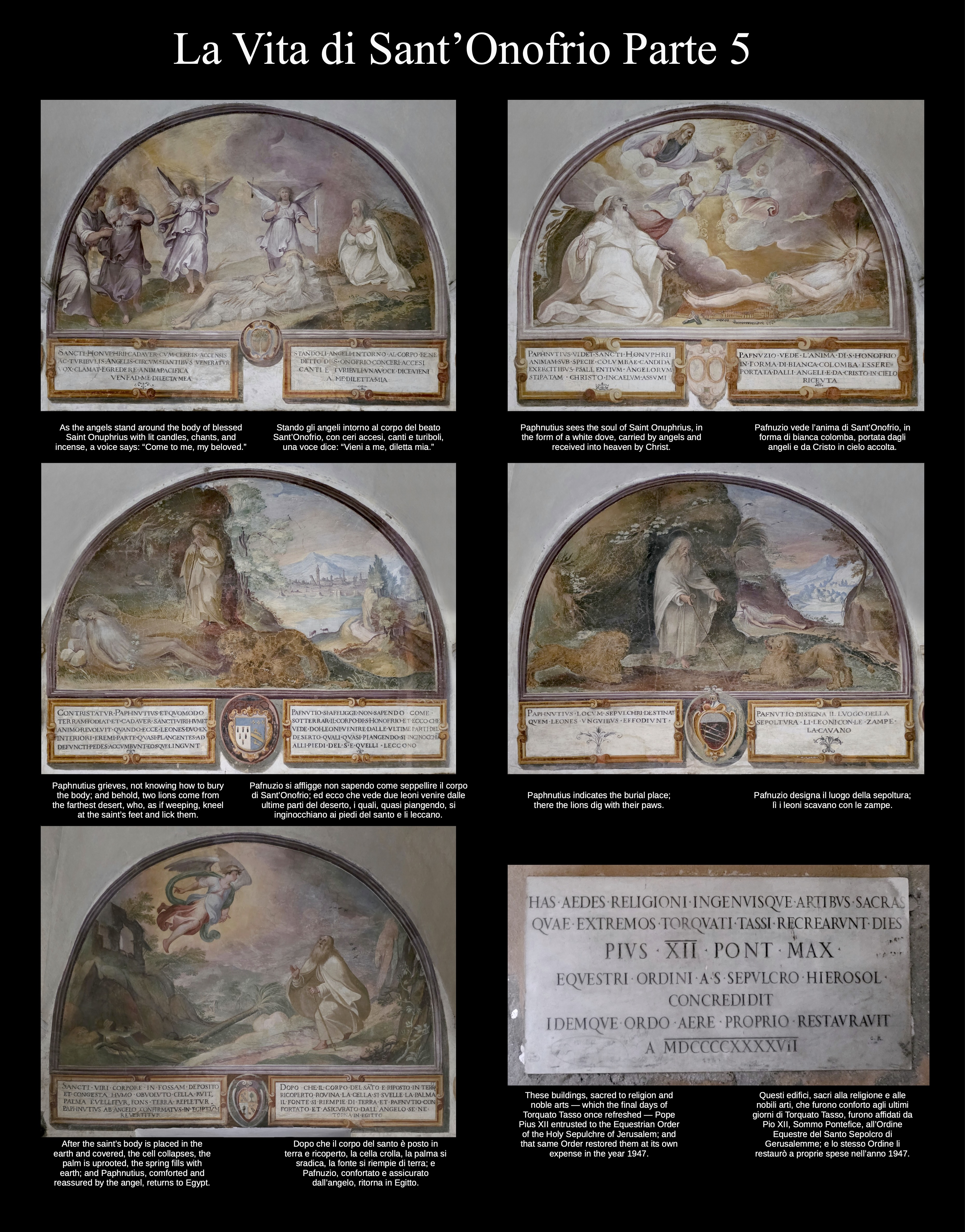
Cloister Lunettes illustrating the Life of Saint Onuphrius Part 5

== Sources ==
- Rome Art Lover
- Roma City (in Italian)
- Death mask of Torquato Tasso
- Tête d'enfant de trois quarts à droite
