= The Fountain of Life (painting) =

Painting by the workshop of Jan van Eyck

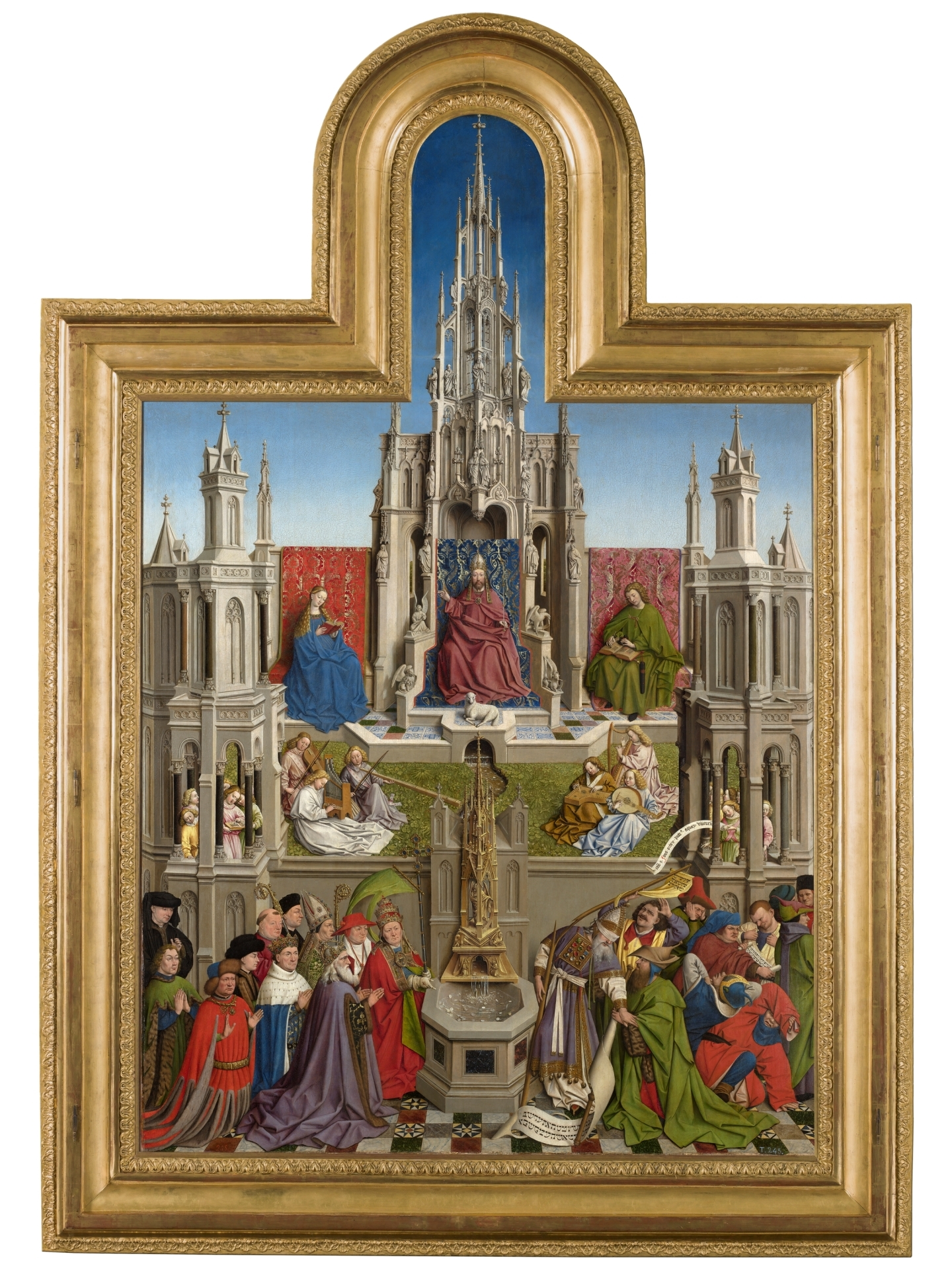
The Fountain of Life, 181 x 119cm. Museo del Prado, Madrid

The Fountain of Life or The Fountain of Grace and the Triumph of the Church over the Synagogue are names given to an oil on panel painting completed c 1432. For most of its history the painting has been in Spain, latterly in the Museo del Prado which recently featured it in a special exhibition. Stylistically and thematically, the painting is related to the work of Jan van Eyck, but it is unsigned and there have been competing theories as to whether it is by van Eyck himself.

The subject matter of the painting would have been of particular interest in 15th century Spain which had the world's largest Jewish community. There has been recent speculation that it was painted by van Eyck himself, possibly while he was on a diplomatic mission to the Iberian Peninsula. However, technical analysis suggests that it was painted in the Netherlands, albeit possibly in response to a commission from Spain, in van Eyck's workshop.

The Fountain of Life closely resembles passages in the 1432 Ghent Altarpiece by Jan and his brother Hubert. Although there is consensus among specialists that it is the product of a workshop, some attribute The Fountain of Life to a youthful Jan, his brother Hubert, or much later, and less likely, Petrus Christus.

The painting is structured into three levels. The top terrace shows a Deësis of God the Son, the Virgin Mary and St. John the Evangelist. The middle section depicts four groups of angels, while the lower level shows two groups of holy men: Christians, led by a Pope, and princes to the right, and Jews, led by blindfolded high priests, to the left. These two groups represent true believers and non believers in Christ as the messiah respectively. The Fountain of Life is a symbol that refers to baptism and/or the Eucharist. The water that flows from the top to the lower terrace, is intended as a symbol of "the Grace that illuminates the Triumphant Church and blinds the Synagogue".

== Description ==
The painting is organised into three horizontal levels or planes, each showing a terrace on which the figures are positioned.

=== Upper terrace ===
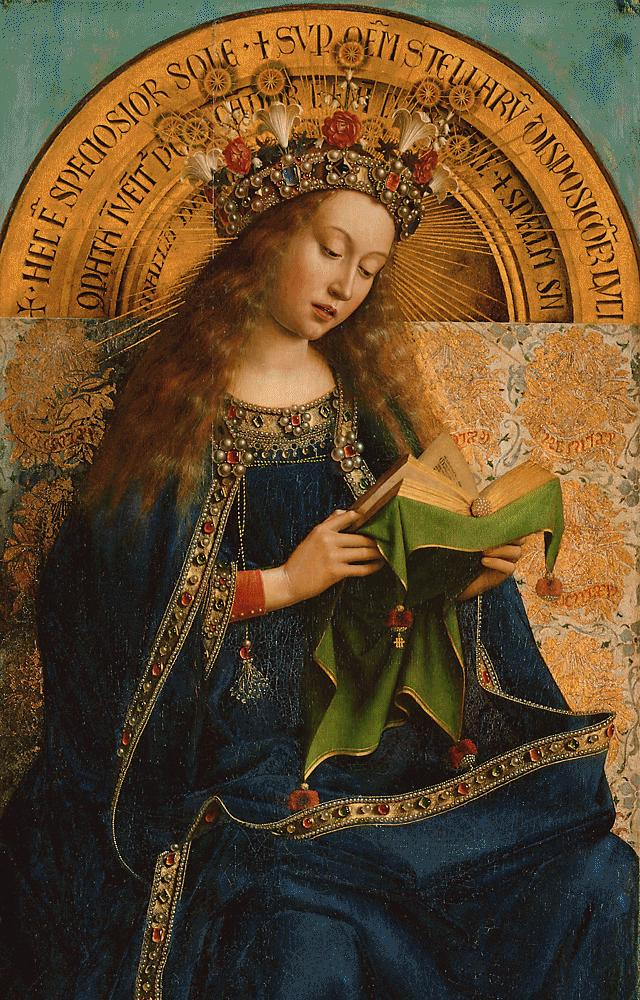
Ghent Altarpiece: The Virgin Mary

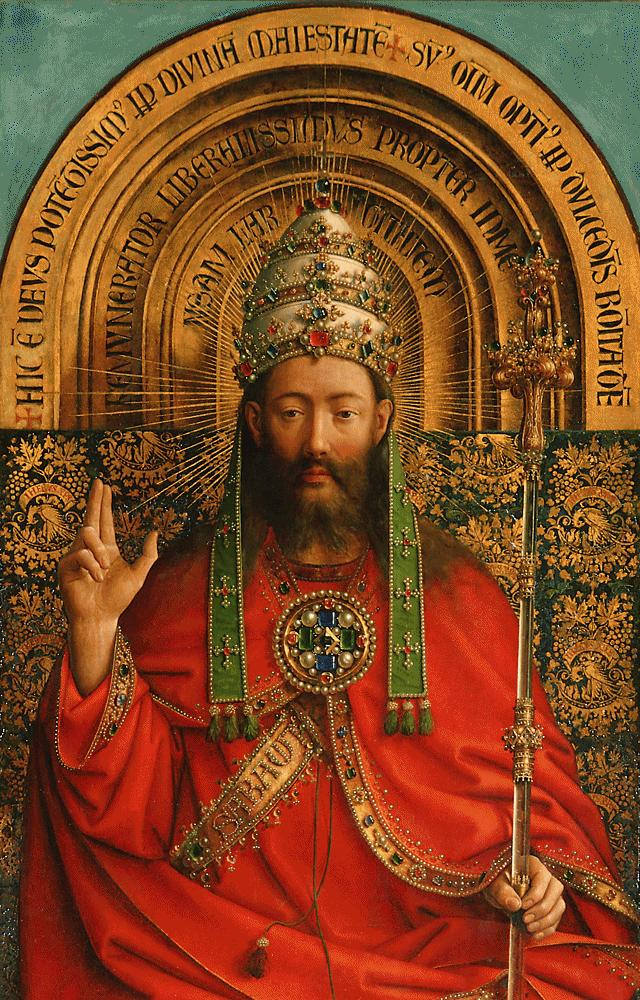
Ghent Altarpiece: God the Father

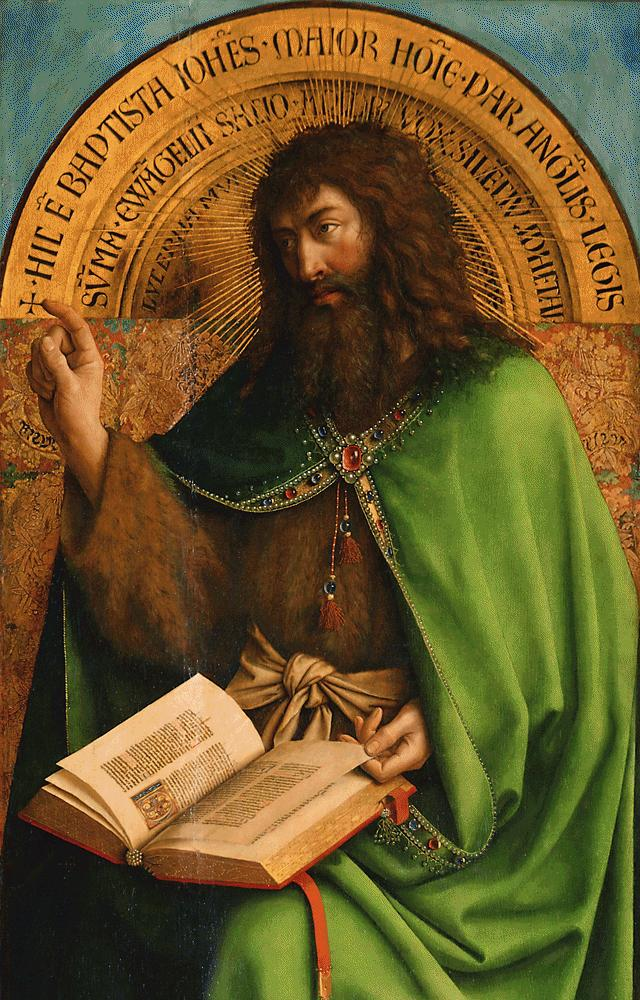
Ghent Altarpiece: John the Baptist

The top level shows a Deësis scene, with God the Father in the center, flanked by the Virgin Mary and St. John the Evangelist. This passage closely resembles a similar scene in the Ghent Altarpiece. All three figures are seated in front of hanging oriental style carpets.

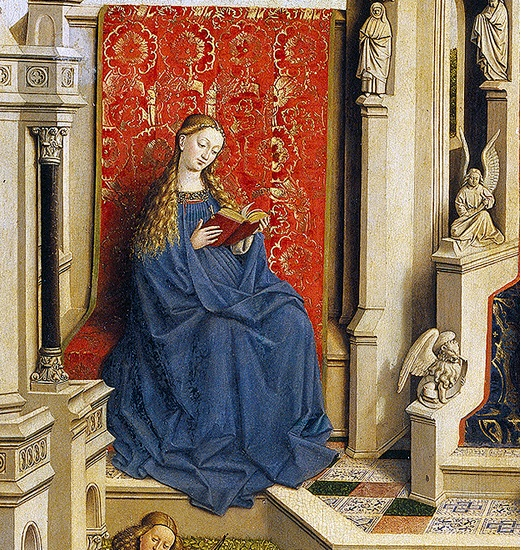
Detail showing the Virgin Mary

God holds a staff in his left hand and raises his right hand in the act of blessing. He is enthroned within a tall, elaborate Gothic architectural setting. His throne contains symbols of the Evangelists while the baldachin around and above him is decorated with illusionistic painted reliefs of Old Testament prophets intended to look like sculptures. The lamb sits on a pedestal before God, on a structure through which the water of grace, symbolising the rite of baptism, flows before reaching the fountain of life in the lowest terrace.

Mary is seated and reading a red book, probably a book of hours. She wears a blue gown, the folds and cloth of which are closely detailed. She has blond hair which is unbraided and falls over her shoulders. In contrast to her depiction in the Ghent Altarpiece, here her dress is plain, lacks any embroidery or gilded lining, while her book is not girdled. John is dressed in a green robe, has blond hair and sits writing in a holy book.

=== Middle terrace ===
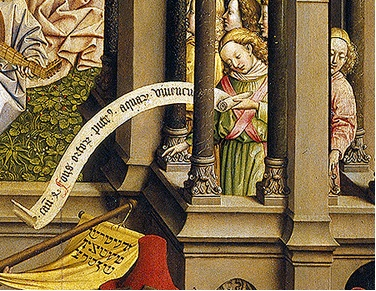
Detail showing musical angels

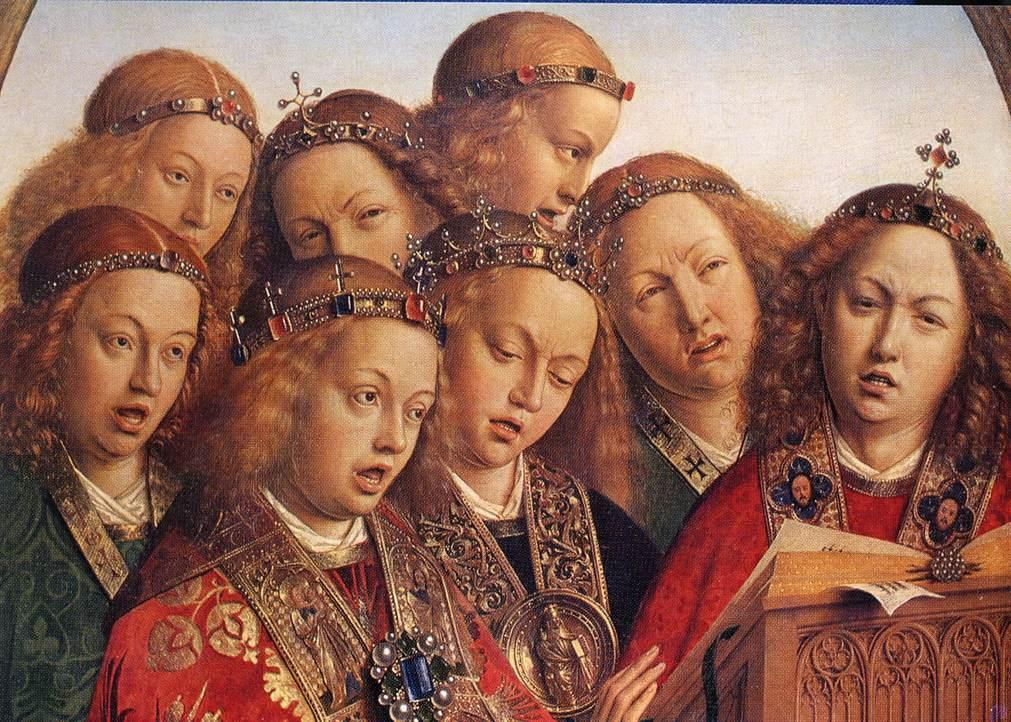
Detail from the "Musical Angels" panel of the Ghent Altarpiece, before 1432

The middle level shows two groups of musical angels dressed in white robes and sitting on grass. Choirs of singing angels are positioned in towers on either side of them. This section is again similar to a panel in the Ghent Altarpiece. The instruments include a harp, a type of viol and a lute.

=== Lower terrace ===
The lower section represents the triumph of the Church over the Jewish Synagogue, through the depiction of the Christians as collect as almost serene, and the Jews as chaotic, blinded and resistant. The fountain of life is positioned in the center, with a group of Christians to its left, including a Pope (possibly Martin V), members of his service, an emperor and various princes.

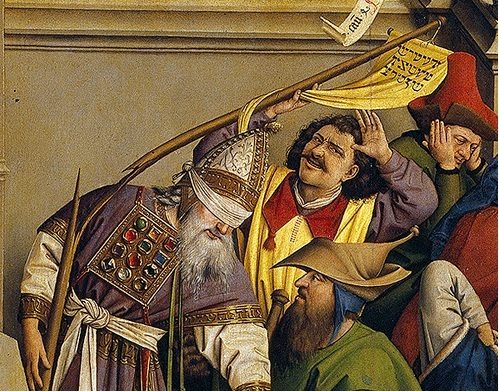
Detail showing the blinded High Priest in the lower terrace

To the right is a grouping of "despairing Jews" who seem to be fleeing from the scene. The figure on the far left of this group is a high priest who has been blindfolded, symbolising his blinding to the true significance of Jesus. A rabbi in the immediate foreground holds a Torah scroll with, according to historian Norman Roth, "gibberish Hebrew writing", while another "Jew shows a scroll to a figure, apparently Christian, who tears his clothing at the sight". In contrast to the Christians, the Jews do not wear grand, ceremonious hats or badges.

They carry a variety of banners, scrolls and parchments, which contain texts that, while illegible, can be recognised as mostly written in Hebrew, with some lettering that is almost nonsensical. The texts are arranged across the passage in a haphazard way, reflecting the disorder of the figures, and more generally within the Synagogue. This placement must be contrasted with those on the two level, where the books held by Mary and John rest stably on their laps.

== Provenance ==
The painting's first documentary record is in the Libro becerro (vellum acquisitions register) of the Monastery of the Parral outside Segovia, which recorded it as the gift of King Henry IV of Castile in 1454. That year marked the beginning of Henry's reign, as well as a building programme at the monastery. He may have inherited the painting from his father John II.

It was secured to the wall of the vestry, being gradually painted into the wall as the vestry was redecorated down the centuries, until it was removed in 1838 as part of the secularisation of the monasteries: parts of the border were lost in the removal but the painting is generally in good condition. The painting was moved to the Trinidade monastery opposite the Atocha station in Madrid, used as a general store for the religious wealth collected.

The painting was photographed in 1859 by Jean Laurent. Its first formal attribution was in 1870 when it was transferred to the Prado, dating it as 1454 on the strength of the entry: however, it was stylistically anachronistic, an accurate dating should have read "before 1454", a mistake which has caused no end of confusion in the 130 years following as scholars attempted to identify a non-existent atelier or pupil/follower of van Eyck's. Following a dendrochronological study undertaken by the Prado in the late 1990s, which dated the felling of the wood to 1418, it was dated to "after 1428" after allowing a standard ten years for seasoning: the Prado currently attributes it to c1432. During the time in the Parral, it became highly influential and was widely copied, one copy was later housed in Palencia Cathedral. Today it is in the collection of the Museo del Prado, Madrid. The Prado version was the star of an exhibition of its reassessments in 2003, and it was previously the subject of the 1957 Utrecht doctoral thesis of Josua Bruyn, who went on to become Professor of the History of Art at Amsterdam and establish the Rembrandt Foundation.

== Gallery ==
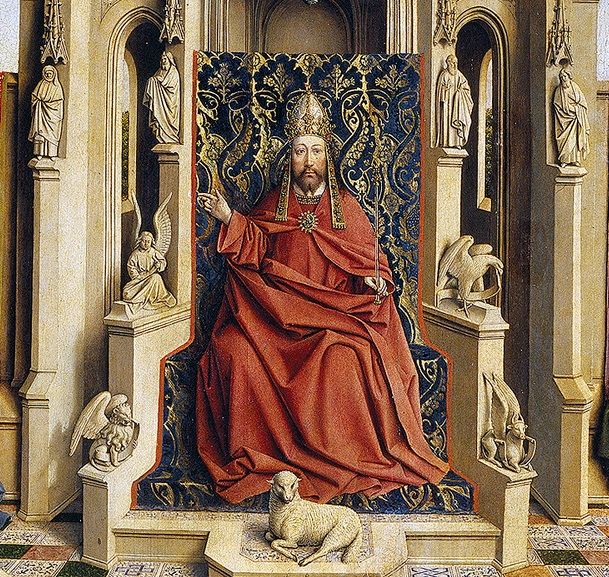
God with the lamb before Him

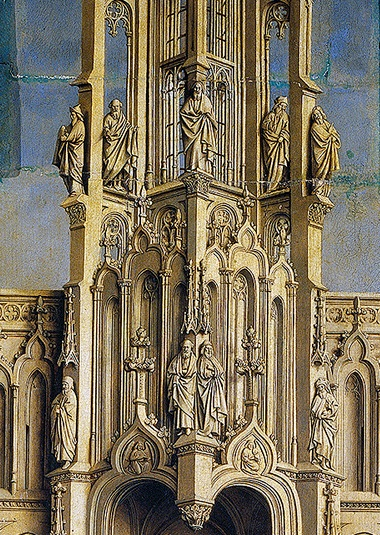
Gothic architecture

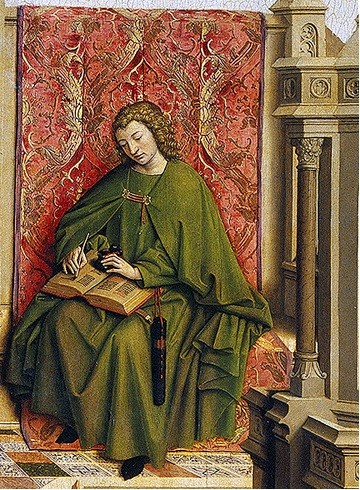
John the Evangelist

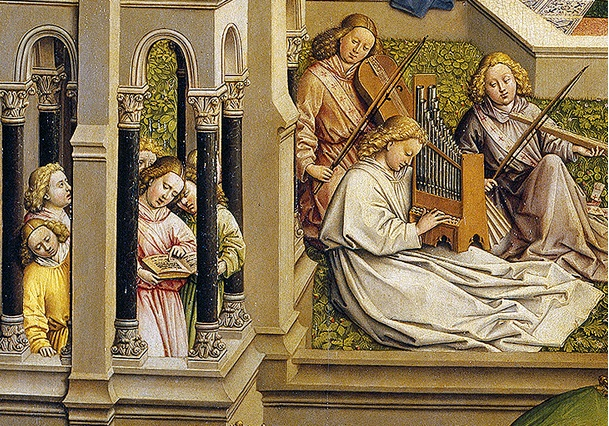
Angels singing or playing musical instruments

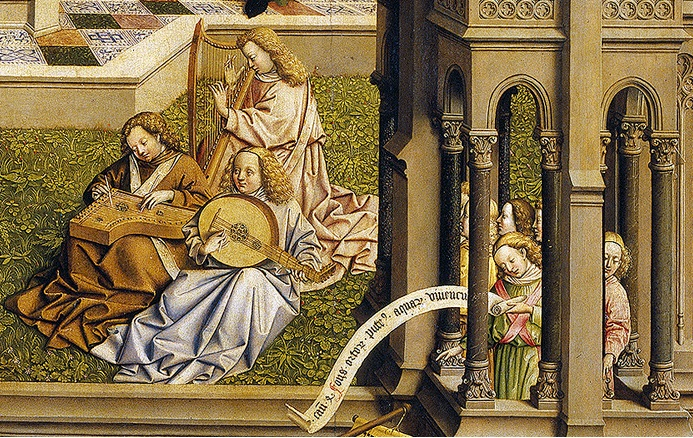
Angels singing or playing musical instruments

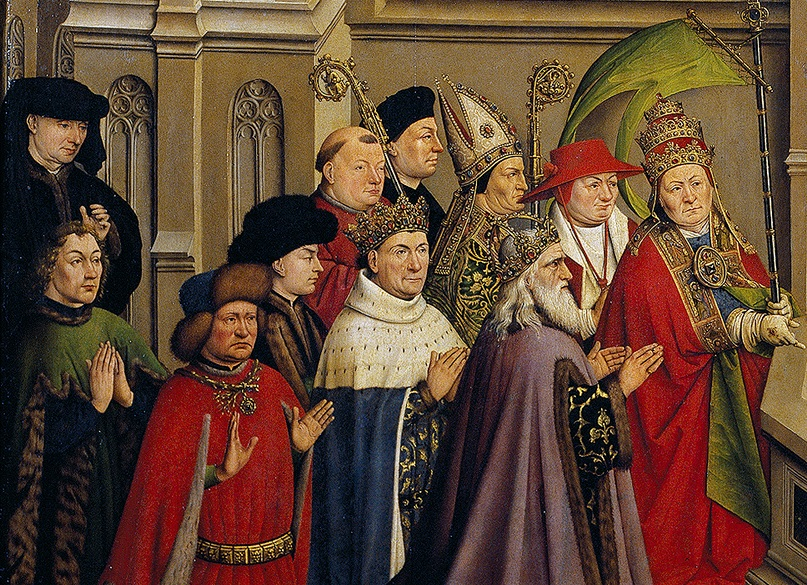
Christians in the lower terrace

== Sources ==
- Benjamin, Andrew E. Of Jews and Animals. Edinburgh: Edinburgh University Press, 2010. ISBN 0-7486-4053-3
- Colas, Dominique. Civil Society and Fanaticism: Conjoined Histories. Palo Alto CA: Stanford University Press, 1997. ISBN 0-8047-2736-8
- Devonshire Jones, Tom; Murray, Linda; Murray, Peter (eds). The Oxford Dictionary of Christian Art and Architecture. Oxford: Oxford University Press, 2013. ISBN 0-1996-8027-2
- Ferrari, Simone. Van Eyck: Masters of Art. Munich: Prestel, 2013. ISBN 3-7913-4826-4
- Ridderbos, Bernhard; Van Buren, Anne; Van Veen, Henk. Early Netherlandish Paintings: Rediscovery, Reception and Research. Amsterdam: Amsterdam University Press, 2005. ISBN 0-89236-816-0
- Roth, Norman. Medieval Jewish Civilization. Routledge, 2014. ISBN 978-1-136-77155-2
- Borchert, Till-Holger. Van Eyck. London: Taschen, 2008. ISBN 3-8228-5687-8
