= Monastery of Santa María del Parral =

Church in Segovia, Spain

Coordinates: 40.9560°N 4.1266°W

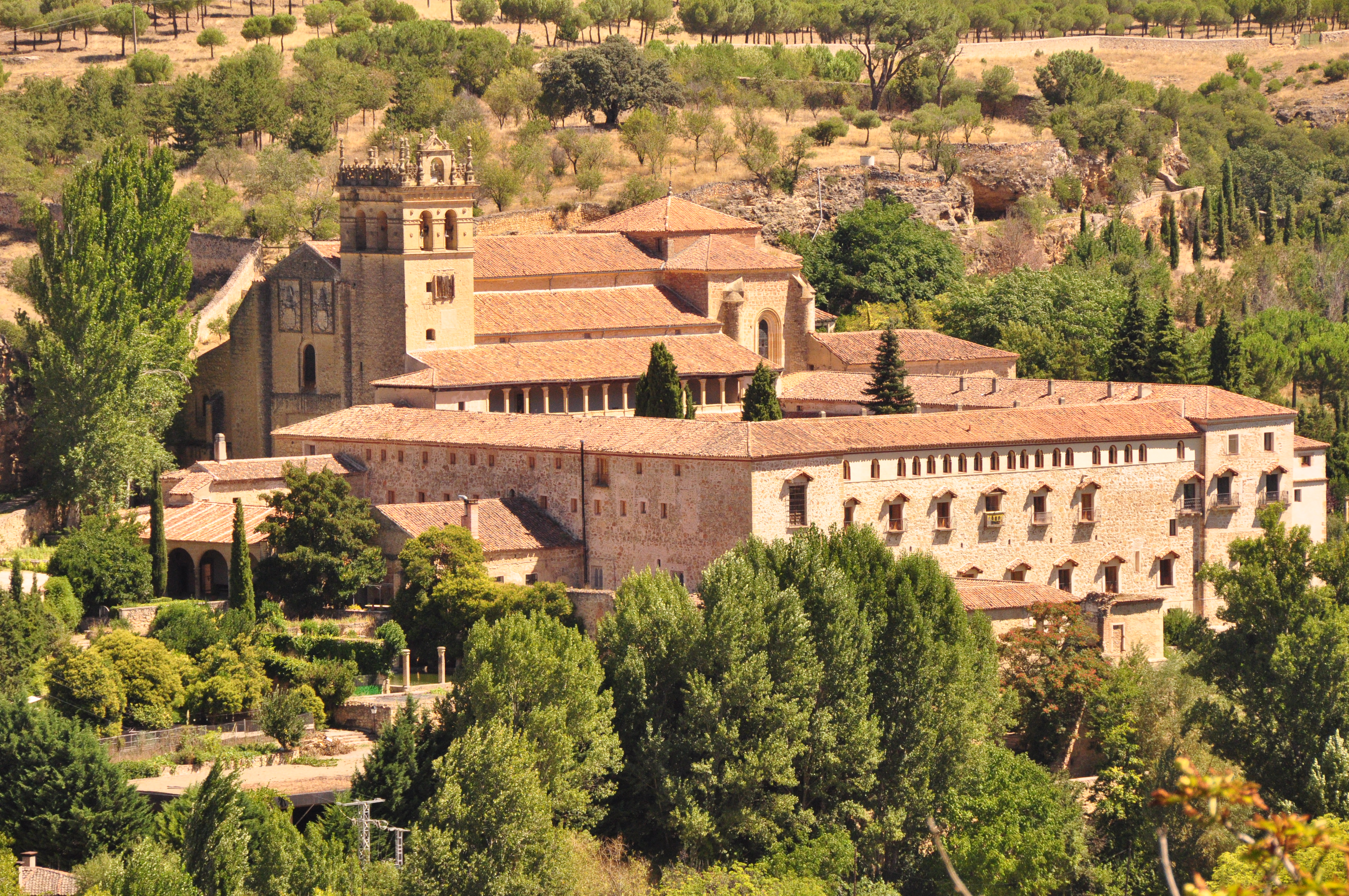
The monastery of Saint Mary of Parral (in Segovia, Spain).

Monastery of Saint Mary of Parral (Spanish: Monasterio de Santa María del Parral) is a Roman Catholic monastery of the enclosed monks of the Order of Saint Jerome just outside the walls of Segovia, Spain.

== History ==
The monastery was founded by King Henry IV of Castile, who acquired the lands before he became king in 1454. Despite a generally irreligious life, Henry IV maintained connections with the Hieronymites and was buried in the sister-house of Monastery of Santa María de Guadalupe.

In the 16th century a mint was built near the monastery using the Eresma River to power the machinery.

The monastery was closed as part of the secularisation program of 1835 (the Ecclesiastical confiscations of Mendizábal).

Following a Papal Decree of 1925, the Hieronymite Order was re-established here in the following years and was finally granted its Rule in 1969.

== Art works ==
There are some works of art in the monastery, for example a 16th-century retable in Renaissance style. However, it is perhaps better known for its association with works that have been removed. Following the closure of the monastery in the 1830s, some of its works of art were moved to Madrid where they were stored in a monastery at Atocha. In the 1870s they were moved again to the Royal Gallery of El Prado in Madrid, where they were stored with little further research, although one painting, the Fountain of Life, also known as the Fountain of Grace, attracted particular interest. Greater investigation took place between 2000 and 2003.

=== The Fountain of Grace ===
The painting The Fountain of Grace (The Triumph of the Church over the Synagogue), has attracted interest because of its presumed connection to the artist Jan van Eyck. It is recorded in the monastery's cartulary as a gift from its founder Henry IV of Castile in 1454. It uses the same symbolic language and constructional forms as part of The Mystic Lamb polyptych in St Bavo's Cathedral, Ghent, Belgium. Theories regarding its attribution have included the idea that it was rushed copy of a lost original, originally commissioned by Pope Eugene IV for a chapel in Brussels, possibly undertaken by Jan van Eyck during a diplomatic mission he undertook to the Iberian Peninsula in the 1430s. There are good reasons for thinking that it was intended for a Spanish client, but current thinking is that is not by Van Eyck, but is from his workshop.

== Access and conservation ==
In 1914 the monastery was declared a National Monument. The monastery is open to the public on a limited basis.

== See also ==
- Order of Saint Jerome
