= Pietro Gambacorta =

Blessed Pietro Gambacorta TOSF
- Born: 15 February 1355; Pisa, Republic of Pisa
- Died: 17 June 1435 (aged 80); Venice, Republic of Venice
- Venerated in: Roman Catholic Church
- Beatified: 9 November 1693, Saint Peter's Basilica, Papal States by Pope Innocent XII
- Feast: 17 June

Pietro Gambacorta (15 February 1355 - 17 June 1435) was an Italian Roman Catholic priest and the co-founder of the Poor Hermits of St. Jerome. He was a professed religious from the Third Order of Saint Francis and co-founded his order in Rome alongside Nicola da Forca Palena. Pope Innocent XII beatified him on 9 November 1693.

== Life ==
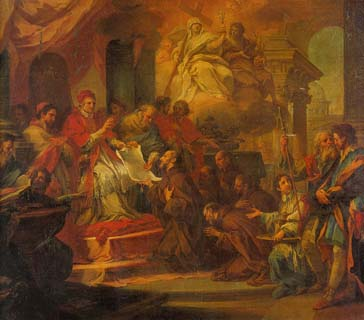
The pope approves the rule of Gambacorta.

Pietro Gambacorta was born in the Republic of Pisa in 1355, the son of a government official and the brother of Chiara Gambacorti. His brothers were Lorenzo and Benedetto. His father and brothers were all killed on 21 October 1392.

At age 22, he experienced a sudden conversion and decided to become a beggar. In 1380, he left home in favor of leading a life of begging and one of hermitage on Monte Cessano in the Umbria province, while also becoming a professed member of the Third Order of Saint Francis. He once converted a band of thieves to the faith and also rallied them to his life of hermitage, which laid the foundations to the Poor Hermits of Saint Jerome that he himself designed. These twelve thieves repented when they saw his austerity and piety. Pope Urban VI approved the rule for his hermitage while he was in Umbria. He co-established the order in Rome on a visit alongside Nicola da Forca Palena.

Pietro Gambacorta’s congregation received papal approval under Martin V in 1420 and later further papal confirmation under Eugene IV. Its early monastery was at Montebello near Isola del Piano, Marche. Gambacorta died on 17 June 1435 in Venice, and the order was suppressed under Pius XI in 1933; his remains are in the church of Saint Jerome in Venice.
