= Iglesia de la Vera Cruz, Segovia =

Church of the True Cross
- Iglesia de la Vera Cruz
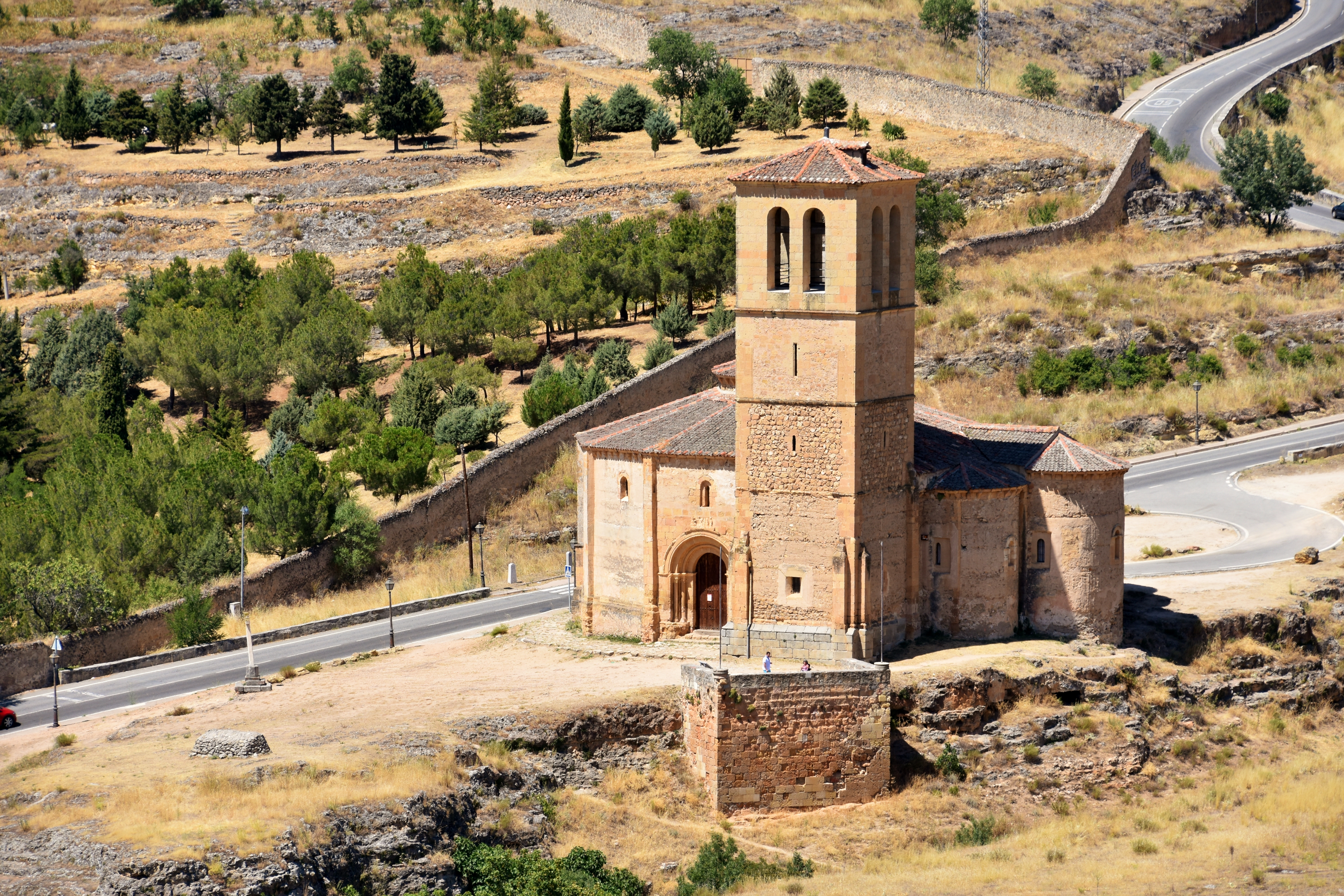
- General view from the Alcázar de Segovia
- Church of the True Cross
- 40°57′20.56″N 4°7′56.17″W
- Location: Segovia
- Country: Spain
- Denomination: Roman Catholic

Architecture
- Functional status: Active
- Heritage designation: Bien de Interés Cultural

Spanish Cultural Heritage
- Official name: Iglesia de la Vera Cruz Carretera de Zamarramala, 4
- Type: Monument
- Designated: 4 July 1919
- Reference no.: RI-51-0000164
- Style: Romanesque, Romano-Gothic
- Completed: c. 1208

The church of the True Cross (Spanish: Iglesia de la Vera Cruz) is a Roman Catholic church located in the San Marcos district of Segovia, in the autonomous community of Castile and León, Spain. Built in the early 13th century, it is one of the most characteristic examples of churches influenced by Crusader architecture. Originally known as the Church of the Holy Sepulchre, the building is situated to the north of the city, near the convent of San Juan de la Cruz, on the slope leading to Zamarramala, a town of which it was, for centuries, the parish church.

The church is widely regarded as one of the most significant examples of centrally planned Romanesque architecture in the Iberian Peninsula. Its distinctive dodecagonal plan, organised around a central two-storey aedicule, has been interpreted as a deliberate evocation of the Church of the Holy Sepulchre in Jerusalem, reflecting the symbolic and devotional importance of the Holy Land in medieval Christian culture. It is one of the best-preserved churches of this style in Europe.

It was declared a Spanish Property of Cultural Interest on 4 July 1919 and is currently administered by the Order of Malta, which uses it for religious ceremonies.

== History ==
The construction of this temple has traditionally been attributed to the Knights Templar. It is now believed that it was built by the Order of the Holy Sepulchre of Jerusalem. It functioned as an encomienda dependent on the Collegiate church of Santa María la Mayor in Zamora.

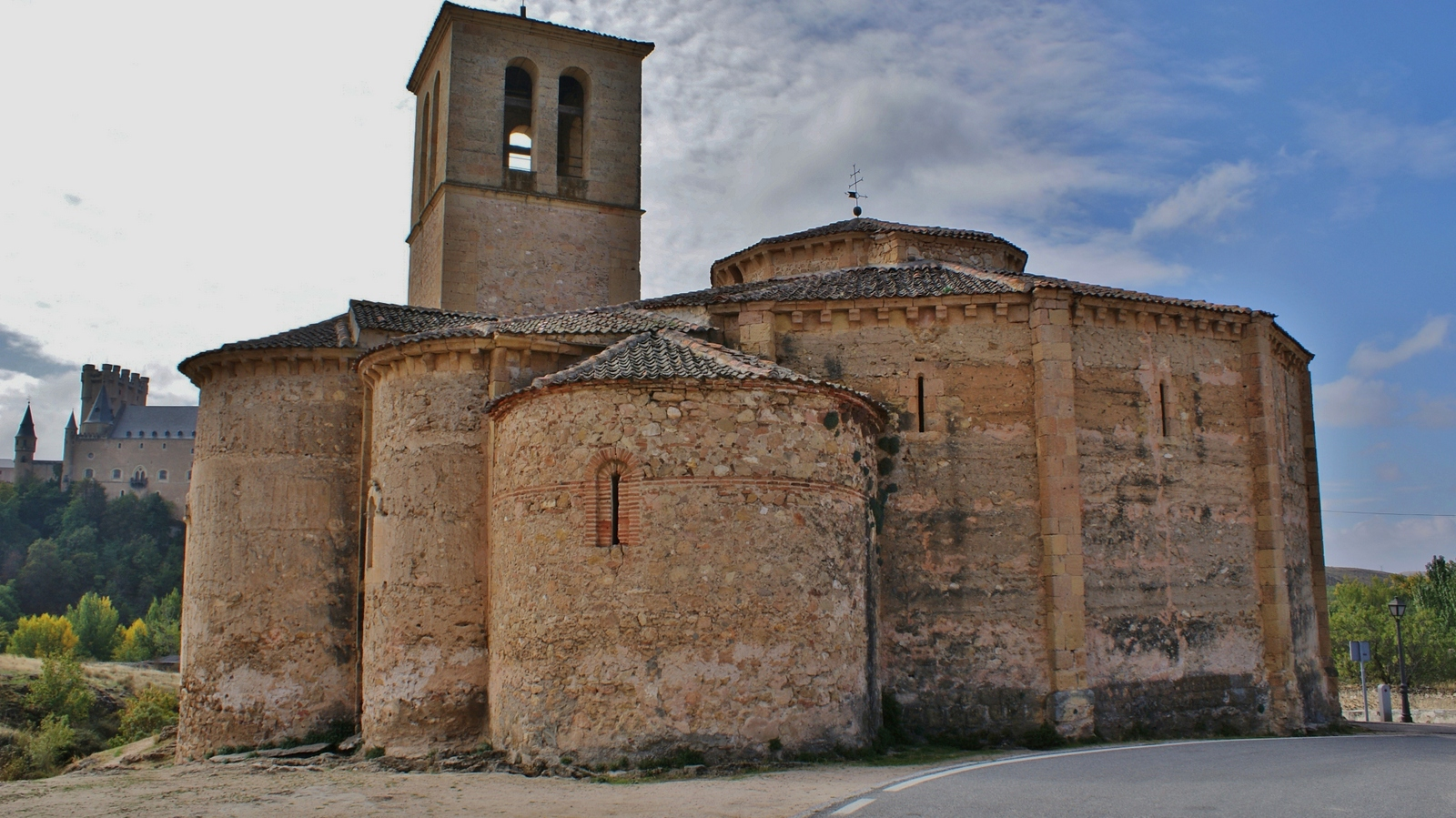
Exterior of the Church of the True Cross in Segovia.

The church was dedicated on 13 September 1208, as recorded in an inscription on the tombstone in front of the side doorway:

Let the founders of this temple be placed in the heavenly seat, and let those who have gone astray accompany them there. Dedication of the Church of the Holy Sepulchre. In the Ides of April, it was 1246 (transcription of the original in Latin).

In 1531, following the unification of the Order of the Holy Sepulchre with the Order of St. John of Jerusalem, it became dependent on the Sovereign Military and Hospitaller Order of St. John of Jerusalem, Rhodes and Malta.

An apse, now used as a sacristy, was later added to the original building. and the tower, initially separated from the church, was attached. Later, three apses were built, giving the church its present appearance.

In 1692 the church ceased to serve as the parish church of Zamarramala. The Virgen de la Paz, whose image made of stone in Romanesque style presides over one of the apses, became the church's patron.

It was declared a Spanish Property of Cultural Interest by Royal Order on 4 July 1919. On 31 May 1951, the Order of Malta took possession of the church again and remains responsible for its conservation and custody.

== Architecture ==
Map of the church

The Church of the True Cross is a centrally planned building constructed in the late Romanesque style, already transitioning towards Gothic. Its most distinctive feature is a dodecagonal nave surrounding a two-storey aedicule, an arrangement derived from early Christian martyrium and baptistery forms. Three apses, a semi-circular sacristy and a square-shaped tower were added over time. A lantern rises slightly above the roof and a tower attached to the building. The tower and a sacristy were later added to the south east of the church.

This type of construction, derived from Roman baptisteries of the early Christianity period, was widely used by different Crusader Orders. Its plan is unusual not only in the Iberian Peninsula but also in Europe. In Spain, very similar plans can be observed in the Romanesque churches of Eunate and Torres del Río in Navarre, and in the church of San Marcos in Salamanca. The design is thought to have been inspired by the Dome of the Rock and the Basilica of the Holy Sepulchre in Jerusalem. The Templars, who had their headquarters in the Holy Land in the Dome of the Rock, built their churches in London, Paris (demolished) and Tomar using similar layouts, as did the Order of the Holy Sepulchre in Torres del Río.

The building is constructed of ashlar masonry, with locally sourced stones, and is reinforced externally by buttresses at regular intervals. Narrow semicircular arrow-slit windows provide interior light, emphasising the defensive and monumental character typical of Romanesque ecclesiastical architecture. The attached tower, with a square plan and divided into four stages, culminates in a belfry pierced by two semicircular openings on each side under a gabled roof. It was originally detached and subsequently integrated into the structure. The tower base is also reinforced with buttresses.

There are two entrances to the church. The main western portal, aligned with the axis of the central apse features a lintelled entrance framed by with a plain tympanum, three decorative columns on each sde and four archivolts decorated with serrated edges. The sculpted capitals of the columns depict birds, warriors, human busts, demons, birds and sirens. The southern portal is simpler with a semicircular arch and sculptural relief representing the visit of the Holy Women and the Angel of the Resurrection to the empty tomb of Christ. The archivolts are undecorated, while the capitals are decorated with vegetal motifs, human figures, birds and sirens.

== Interior ==
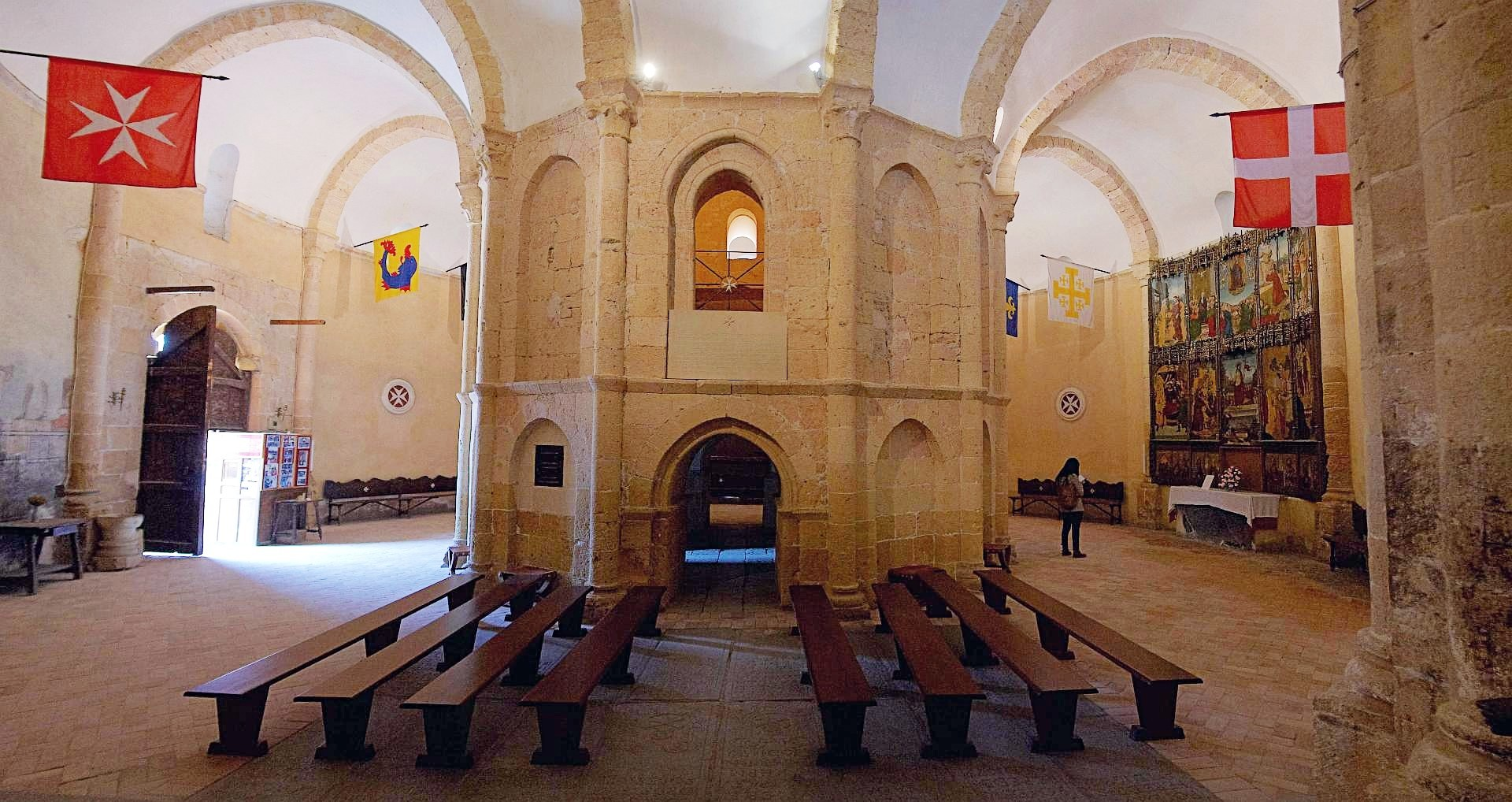
Interior of the Vera Cruz with the central aedicula and the flags

The central two-storey aedicula dominates the interior of the church. Accessed by a double staircase, ithe upper chamber, crowned by a dome of caliphal inspiration, contains an altar decorated in Mudéjar style, while the lower chamber, structured by four pointed arches aligned with the cardinal points and covered by a ribbed vault, faces the main entrance. Although the functions of these rooms are unknown, it is thought that the upper room may have been used for knighthood or initiation, while the lower room may have been intended for penitential practices. Today, religious celebrations of the Knights of the Order of Malta are organised on the upper floor. The central apse houses a 13th century crucifix. The left apse contains the church tabernacle and is decorated with a copy of an image of St. John the Baptist, whose original is displayed in the Order's headquarters in Madrid. The right apse hosts an Romanesque image of the Virgin of Peace. A Gothic altarpiece from 1516, belonging to the Castilian school, is placed against one of the walls of the circular nave. It originally adorned the central apse and depicts scenes from the life of Christ. Vestiges of old mural decoration are preserved on the walls. Two niches contains representations of Our Lady of Philermos and St. John the Baptist, both patron saint of the Order of Malta. Flags of the Order of Malta, representing its different divisions, hang throughout the nave.

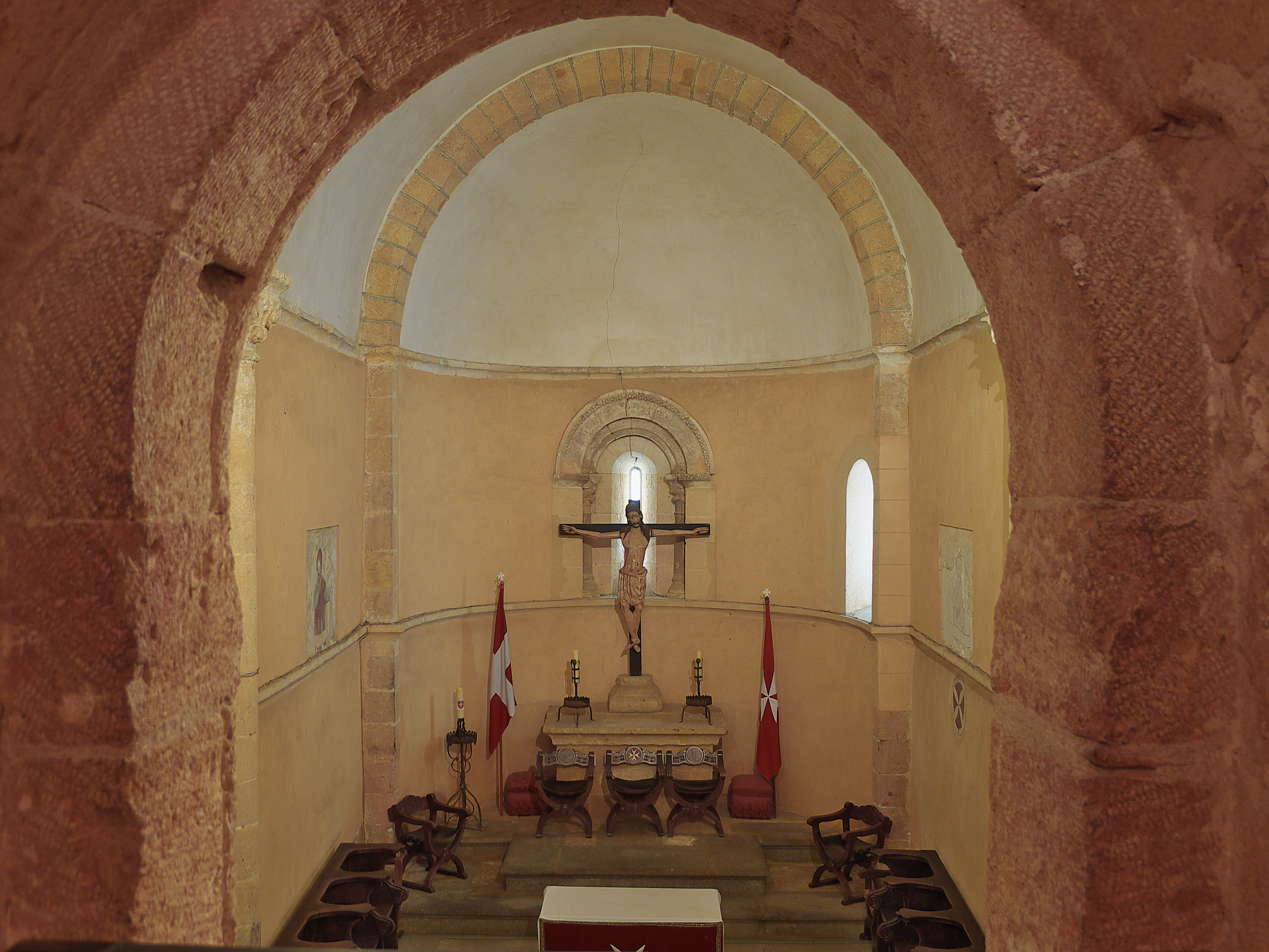
The high altar of the church

On the ground floor of the tower, a 16th-century stone niche bearing the coats of arms of a commander of the Order of the Holy Sepulcher was built to house a relic of the True Cross. The relic of the cross is nowadays on display in the parish church of Zamarramala, after several attempted robberies.

== Celebration ==
The Order of Malta holds religious ceremonies in this church. The procession of Good Friday is particularly notable, especially the procession of the Lying Christ and the Lignum Crucis in which members of the Order of Malta participate wearing black choir habits.

== See also ==
- Monastery of Santa María del Parral
- High medieval domes

== Bibliography ==
- Colmenares, Diego de (1846) [1635]. "Capítulo XIX – Obispo de Segovia elige abades de Santa María de la Sierra – Fundación de la Vera Cruz por los templarios – (...)". Historia de la insigne ciudad de Segovia: compendio de las historias de Castilla (in Spanish). Segovia: Imp. de Eduardo Baeza. pp. 292–293.
- Blair Moore, Kathryn (2017). The Architecture of the Christian Holy Land: Reception from Late Antiquity through the Renaissance. Cambridge University Press. pp. 93–94. ISBN 978-1-316-94313-7.
- Haag, Michael (9 July 2010). Templars: History and Myth: From Solomon's Temple to the Freemasons. Profile Books. pp. 312–313. ISBN 978-1-84765-251-5.
- Cabello y Dodero, Francisco Javier (1951). La iglesia de la Vera Cruz (PDF). Segovia: Instituto Diego de Colmenares. pp. 425–445.
- Lozoya, Marqués de; Ayala, Juan de Contreras y López de (1954). "Algunos antecedentes de la iglesia de la Vera Cruz de Segovia". Boletín de la Sociedad Española de Excursiones (58): 5–19. ISSN 1697-6762.
- Fuguet Sans, Joan (2007). "La historiografía sobre arquitectura templaria en la Península Ibérica". Anuario de Estudios Medievales (in Spanish). 37 (1): 367–386. doi:10.3989/aem.2007.v37.i1.42. ISSN 1988-4230.
- Díez, Gonzalo (1993). Templarios en la Corona de Castilla. Burgos: Editorial La Olmeda. ISBN 9788460462774.
- López-Yarto, Amelia (2008). La Iglesia de la Vera Cruz de Segovia y la Orden del Santo Sepulcro. Calatayud: Centro de Estudios de la Orden del Santo Sepulcro.
- Montejo, M. Inés Ruiz (1986). "Una iglesia relicario de atribución incierta: Vera Cruz de Segovia". En la España Medieval (9): 1003–1018. ISSN 0214-3038.
- Lapiedra, Luis Cabello (1919). "La Vera-Cruz de Segovia nunca fue de los Templarios" [The Vera-Cruz of Segovia never belonged to the Templars] (PDF). Arquitectura: órgano de la Sociedad Central de Arquitectos (in Spanish) (14): 165–169. ISSN 0211-3384.
- López de Ayala y Álvarez de Toledo, Jerónimo (1919). "La iglesia de Vera-Cruz en Segovia". Boletín de la Real Academia de la Historia (in Spanish). 74: 297–305.
- Jeffery, George (2010). A Brief Description of the Holy Sepulchre Jerusalem and Other Christian Churches in the Holy City: With Some Account of the Mediaeval Copies of the Holy Sepulchre Surviving in Europe. Cambridge University Press. pp. 212–213. ISBN 978-1-108-01604-9.
- Gailhabaud, Jules (1859). "Chapelles de l'Ordre Militaire du Temple à Ségovie et à Ramersdorffs". L'architecture du V. au XVII. siecle et les arts qui en dependent, la sculpture, la peinture murale, la peinture sur verre (etc.) (in French). Gide. pp. 133–143.
- Ministerio de Cultura (2020). "Bienes culturales protegidos". www.culturaydeporte.gob.es (in Spanish).
- Lampérez y Romea, Vicente (1898). "Los trazados geométricos de los monumentos españoles de la Edad Media. La iglesia de los Templarios en Segovia. Sección de Bellas Artes". Boletín de la Sociedad Española de Excursiones (in Spanish). 6 (62): 36–39. ISSN 1697-6762.
- Merino de Cáceres, J. M. (1998). La Iglesia de la Vera-Cruz de Segovia. Conocida como de los Templarios (PDF). Segovia: Academia de Historia y Arte de San Quirce. Archived from the original (PDF) on 2019-08-15.
- Lampérez y Romea, Vicente (1936) [1908-1909]. Historia de la arquitectura cristiana española en la Edad Media según el estudio de los elementos y los monumentos (in Spanish). Vol. II. Madrid: Espana-Calpe. pp. 78–81.
- Gadea, Sira (23 May 2016). "La iglesia de la Vera Cruz de Segovia". Viajar con el Arte.
- Dathe, Stefanie (2001). La Vera Cruz in Segovia : dialektische Untersuchung zu Ursprung, Baugeschichte und Funktion eines romanischen Zentralbaus in Alt-Kastilien (PDF) (in German). Weimar: VDG, Verlag und Datenbank für Geisteswissenschaften. ISBN 3-89739-206-2.
- Palma Crespo, Milagros; Sánchez Aparicio, Luis Javier; Sanz Arauz, David; et al. (2023). "La iglesia de la Vera Cruz de Segovia. Propuesta metodológica para su estudio". II Simposio de Patrimonio Cultural ICOMOS España (PDF). Universitat Politècnica de València. doi:10.4995/Icomos2022.2022.15360. ISBN 978-84-1396-045-6.
- Sanz-Arauz, David; Rodríguez-Escalante, María; del Río-Calleja, Beatriz; López-Andrés, Sol (2024). "Characterization, Analysis, and Investigation of the Provenance of the Stone Construction Materials of the Vera Cruz Church (Segovia, Spain)" (PDF). Minerals. 14 (2): 1–17. Bibcode:2024Mine...14..178S. doi:10.3390/min14020178.
- Carmona Pérez, Juan Manuel (2026). "The Church of the Vera Cruz in Segovia, Spain: An Echo of Jerusalem in Castile" (PDF). Patria Hierosolymitana: 1–7. doi:10.11588/heidok.00037614.
- Castán Lanaspa, Javier (1996). "La arquitectura de las órdenes militares en Castilla" (PDF). Codex aquilarensis: Cuadernos de investigación del Monasterio de Santa María la Real (12): 135–152. ISSN 0214-896X.
