= Revenga =

Town in Segovia, Castile and León, Spain

Coordinates: 40°52.25′N 4°06.13′W

- Municipality
- Revenga
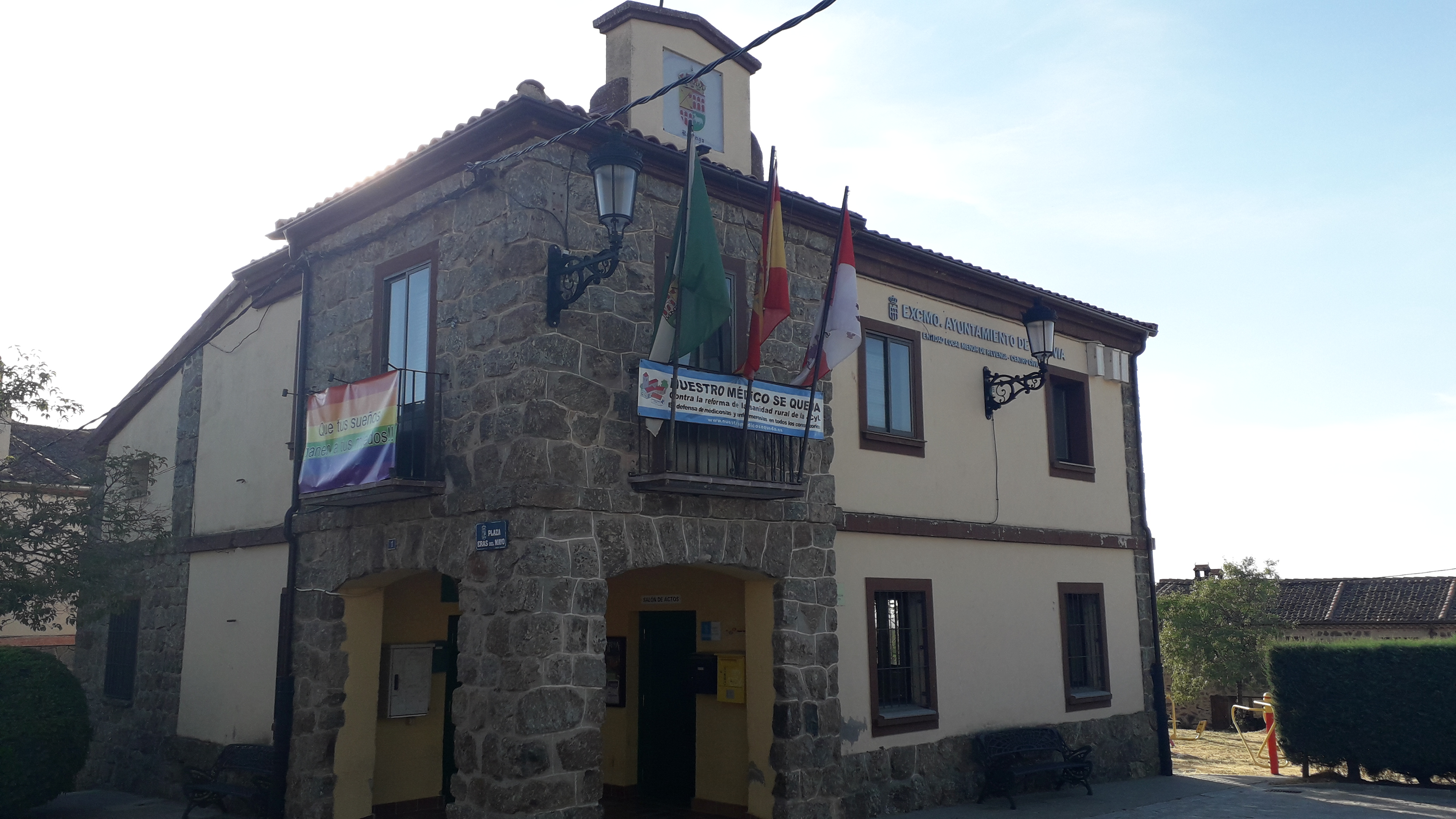

- Location in Spain. Revenga (Spain)
- Country: Spain
- Autonomous community: Castile and León
- Province: Segovia
- Municipality: Segovia
- Elevation: 1,149 m (3,770 ft)

Population (2023)
  - Total: 575
- Demonym(s): revengano, -a
- Time zone: UTC+1 (CET)
  - Summer (DST): UTC+2 (CEST)
- Postal code: 40195

Revenga is a city and a municipality constituted as a semi-dependent minor local entity which belongs to the municipality of Segovia, located in the province of Segovia, Castile and León, Spain.

According to the 2023 census (INE), the locality has a population of 575 inhabitants.
