= Sirenas de Segovia =

Sirens of Segovia
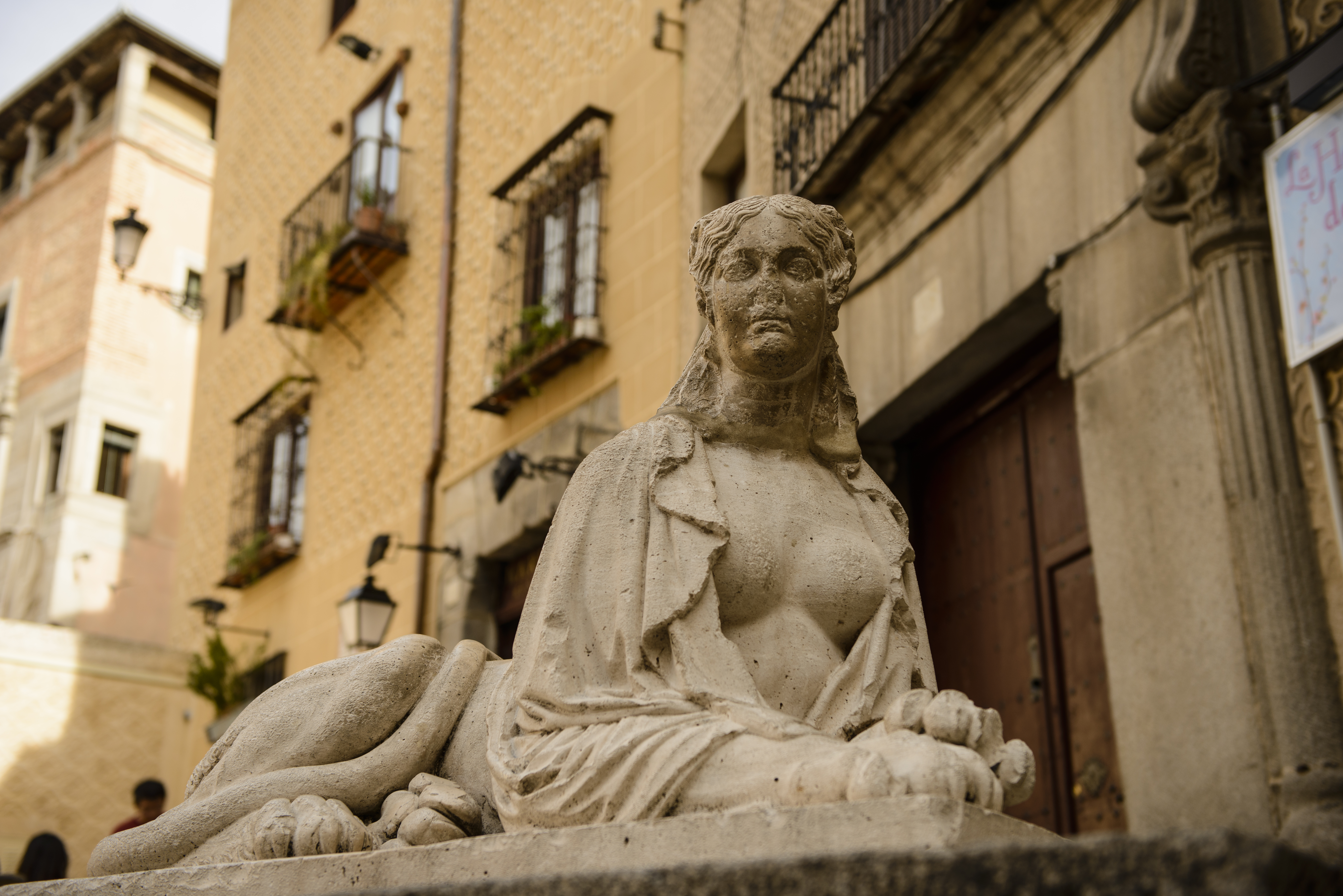
- Sculpture on the right
- Type: Sculpture
- Location: Segovia (Spain)
- Coordinates: 40°56′55″N 4°07′18″W
- Built: 1852
- Artist: Francisco Bellver

The Sirens of Segovia (Sirenas de Segovia) are two sculptures located in the Plaza de Medina del Campo in the city of Segovia, in the autonomous community of Castile and León.

They are the work of the sculptor Francisco Bellver in 1852, and are situated flanking the statue of Juan Bravo. Carved from limestone, the figures have female heads set on lion bodies. Although the sculptor intended to depict two mermaids, they bear more resemblance to sphinxes than to the mythological sea creatures.

== Location and description ==
In 1850 the city council commissioned the sculptor Francisco Bellver to create two mermaid sculptures, two lampposts and a fountain, with the contract signed a year later. It stipulated the creation of two mermaids for the staircase of the new fountain, Cuesta de San Martín, at a cost of 11,000 reales. After missing the delivery deadlines, the sculptor sent the pieces in 1852, the year in which they were installed at their current location; the works were carried out as part of a wider remodelling of the square during that period.

Although their status as mermaids is well documented, the figures bear a much closer resemblance to sphinxes. In ancient Greece, mermaids (sirens) were depicted with the head and breasts of a woman, the wings of a bird, and the body and feet of a lion; in this case, with the exception of the wings, the figures conform to that classical depiction of sirens.

The sculptures stand at the top of the staircase in the Plaza de Medina del Campo, which leads into the Plaza de San Martín, and flank the sculpture that Aniceto Marinas dedicated to the comunero Juan Bravo, unveiled in 1921 in honour of the Castilian nobleman who led the Revolt of the Comuneros. The square is popularly known as the Plaza de Juan Bravo or the Plaza de las Sirenas ("Square of the Mermaids"), although its official name is Medina del Campo.

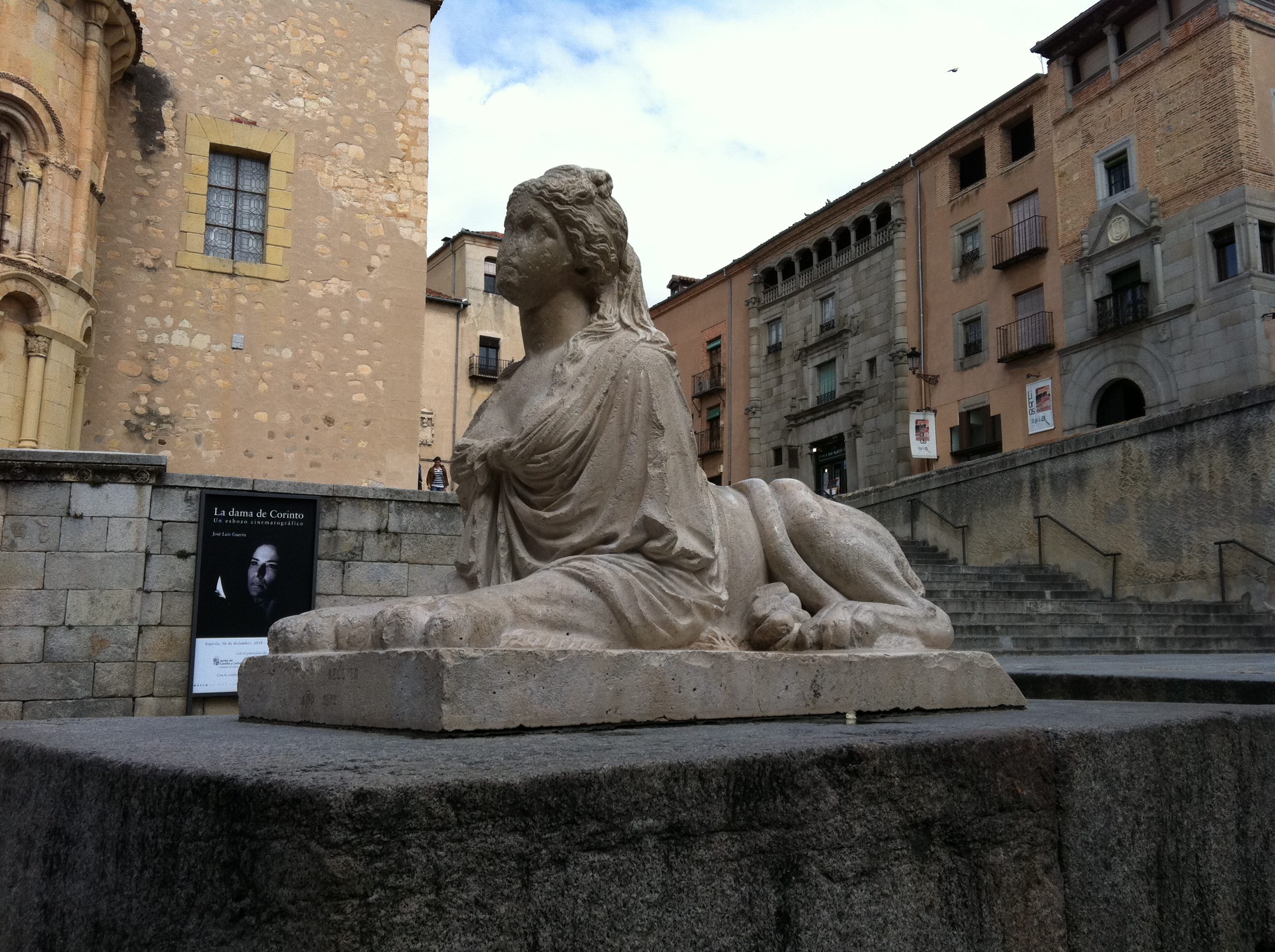
Sculpture on the left.

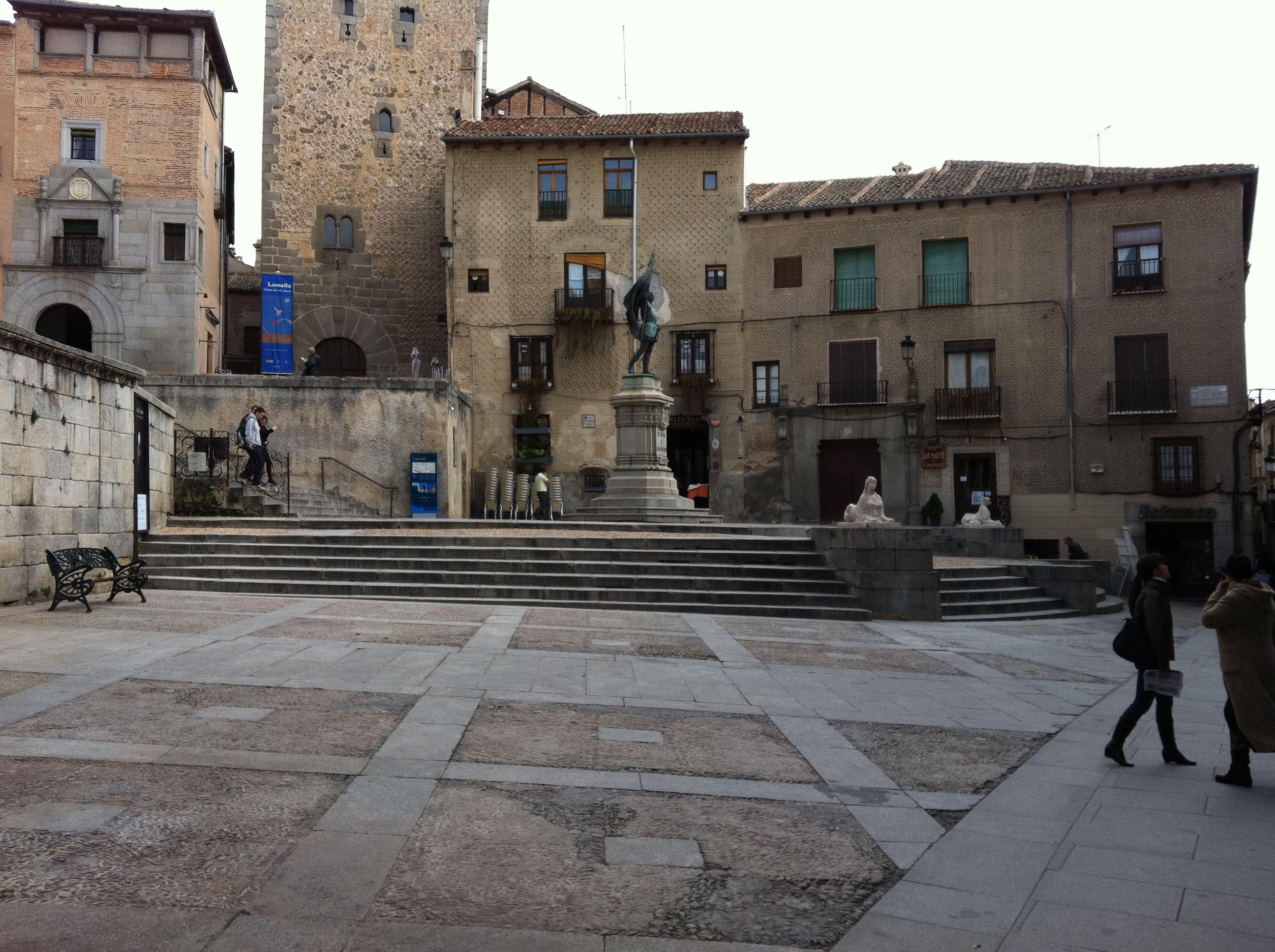
Plaza de las Sirenas.

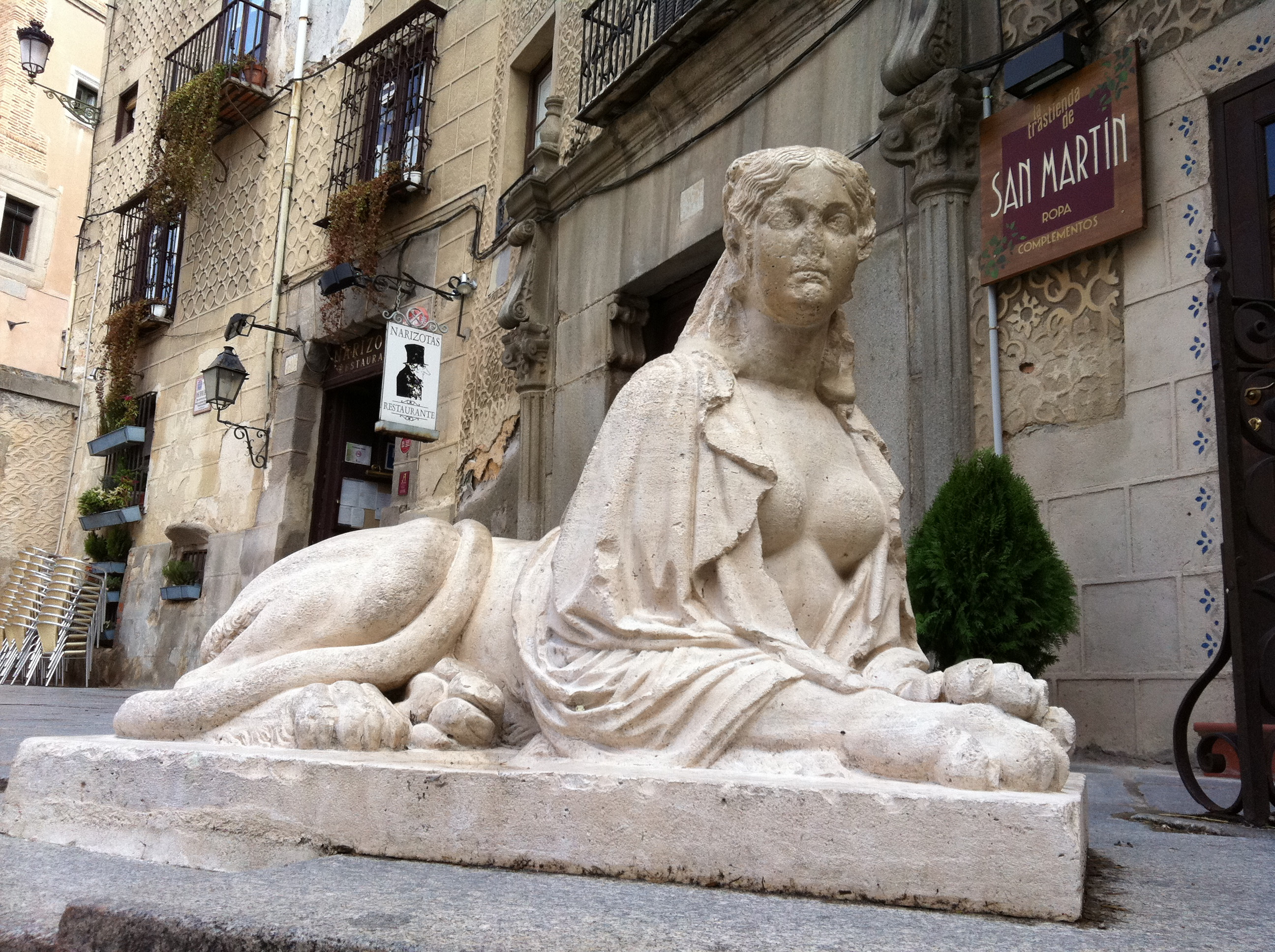
Sculpture on the right.

== Bibliography ==
- Martín, José Luis (1992). La escultura segoviana. Segovia. ISBN 84-606-0909-X.
