= Segovienne =

Spanish flannel cloth used for upholstery in the 1300s to 1600s

Segovienne was a Spanish flannel cloth used for upholstery in the 14th to 17th centuries. It was produced in Segovia.

== Weave ==
Segovienne was a twilled weave structure with a hairy surface produced by using Spanish wool.

== Use ==
However, apart from upholstery, Its use as everyday clothing and children's clothing expanded in the 18th century.
