= Segovia =

City in the autonomous community of Castile and León, Spain

- Municipality
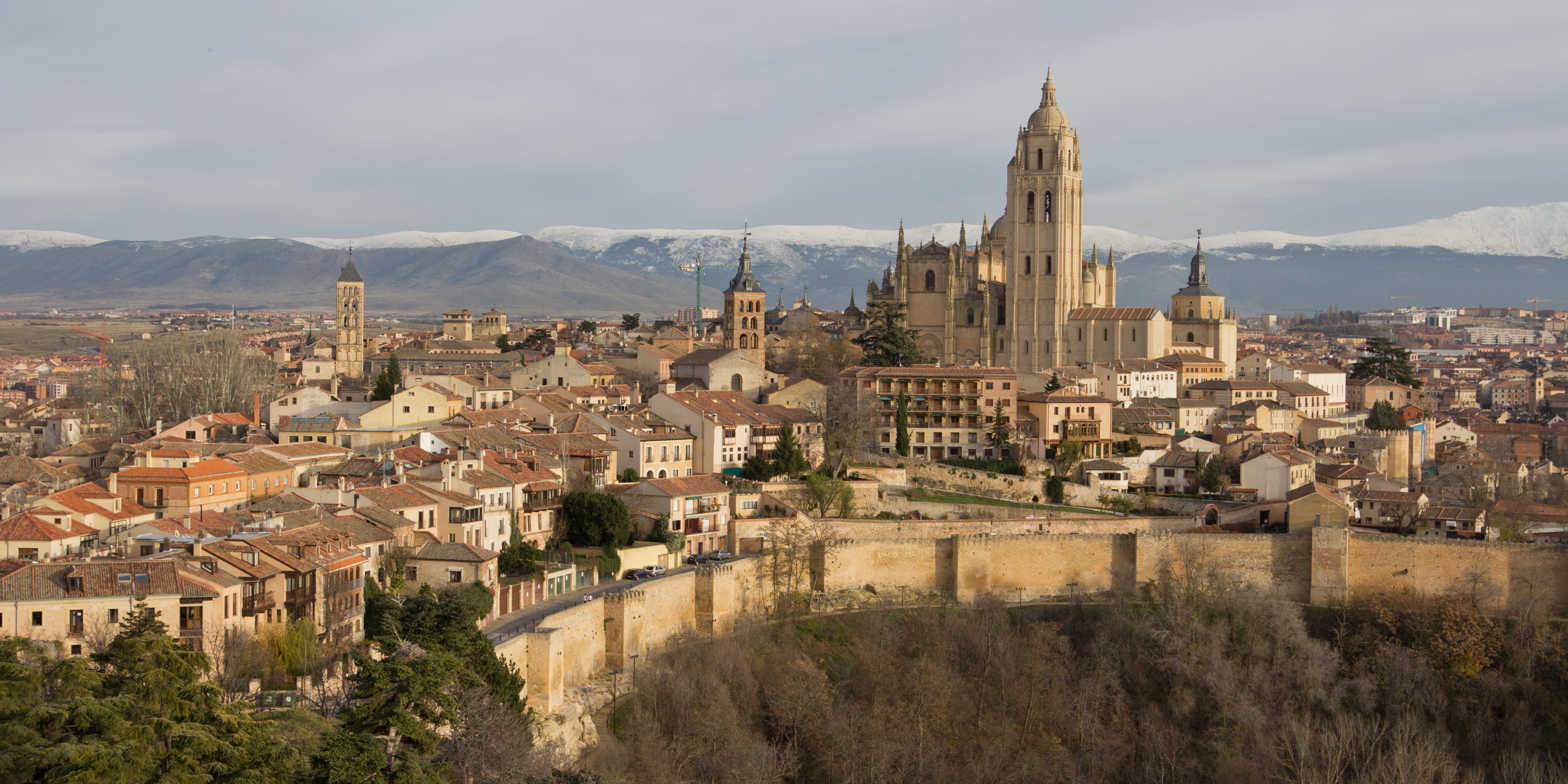
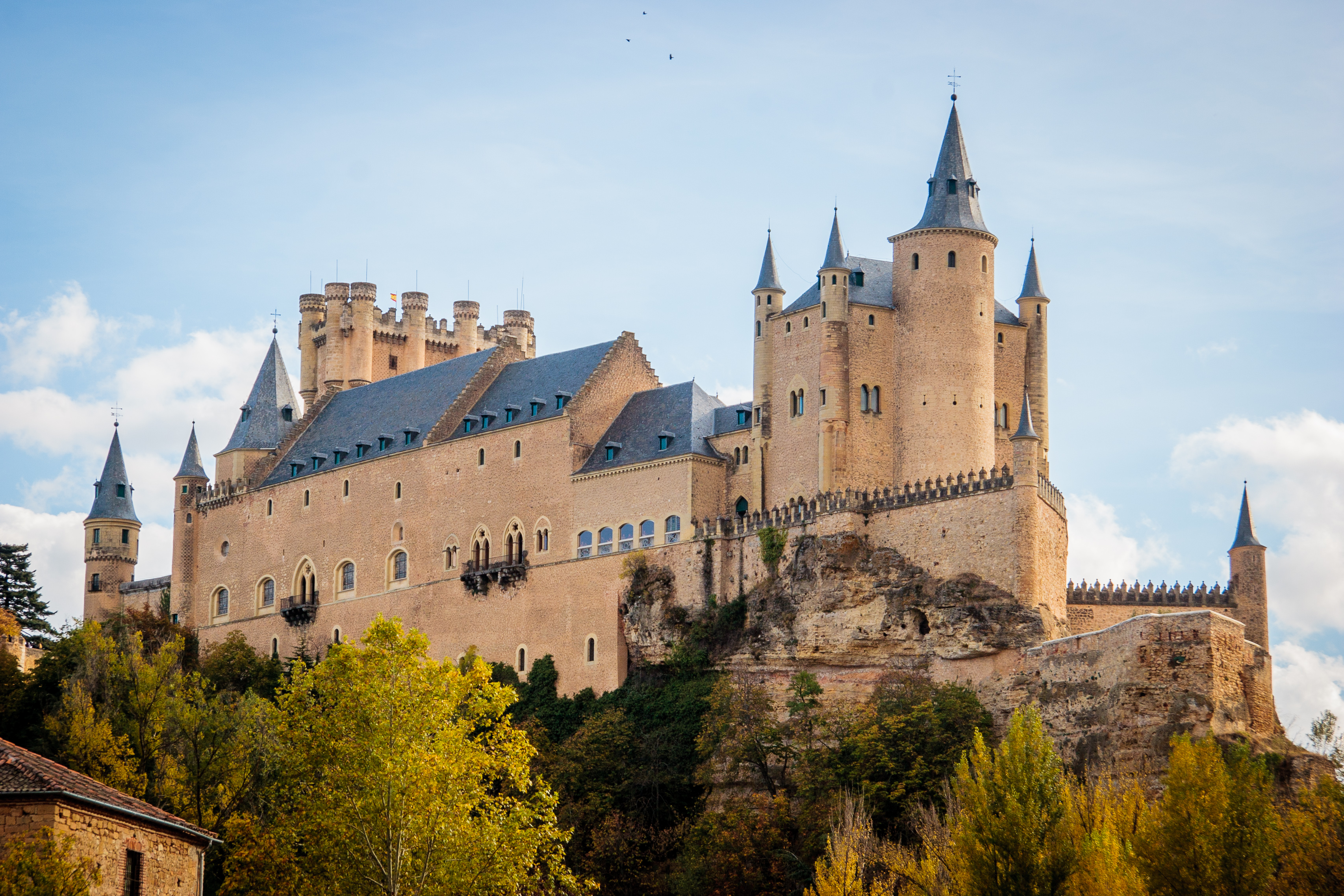
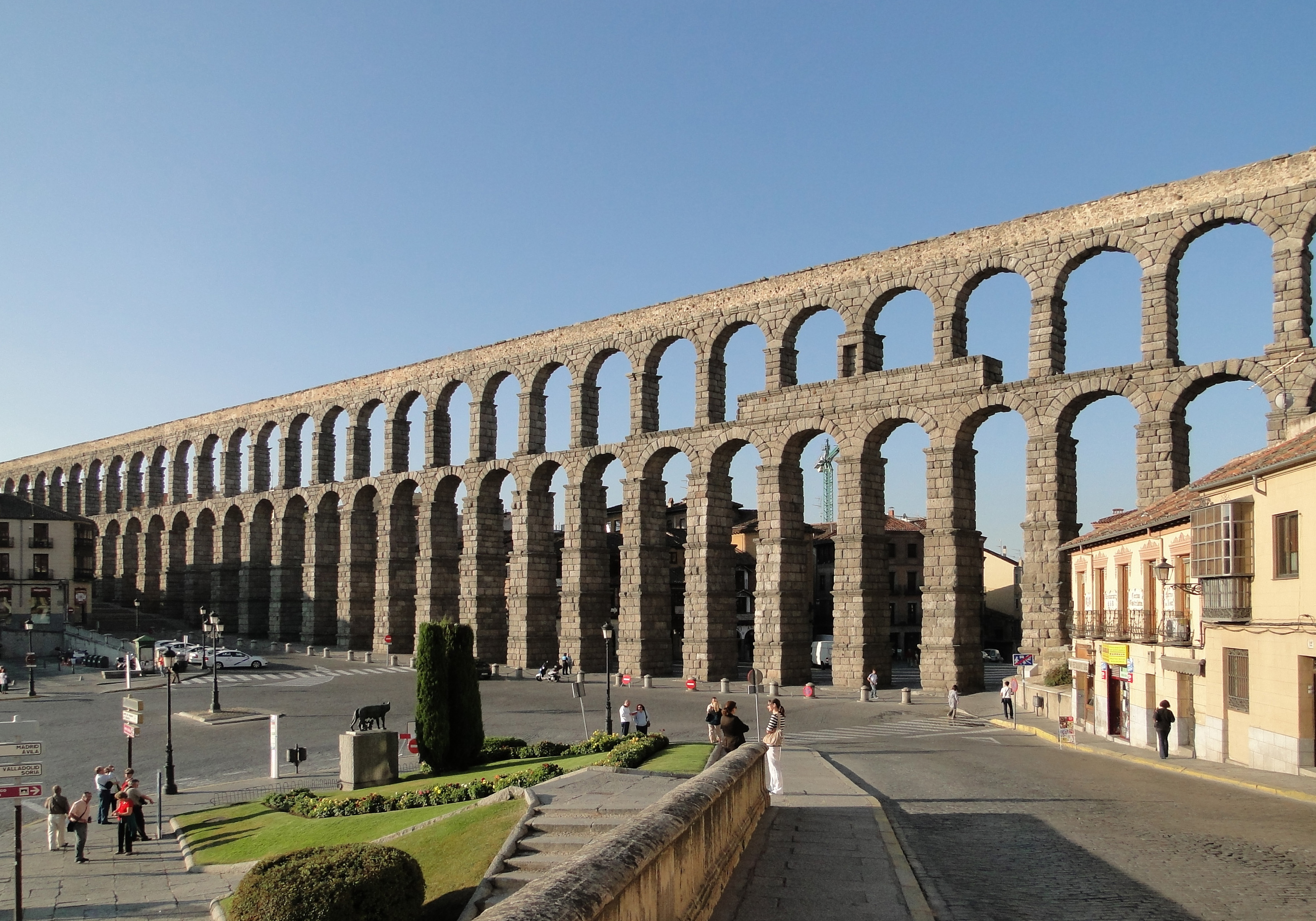
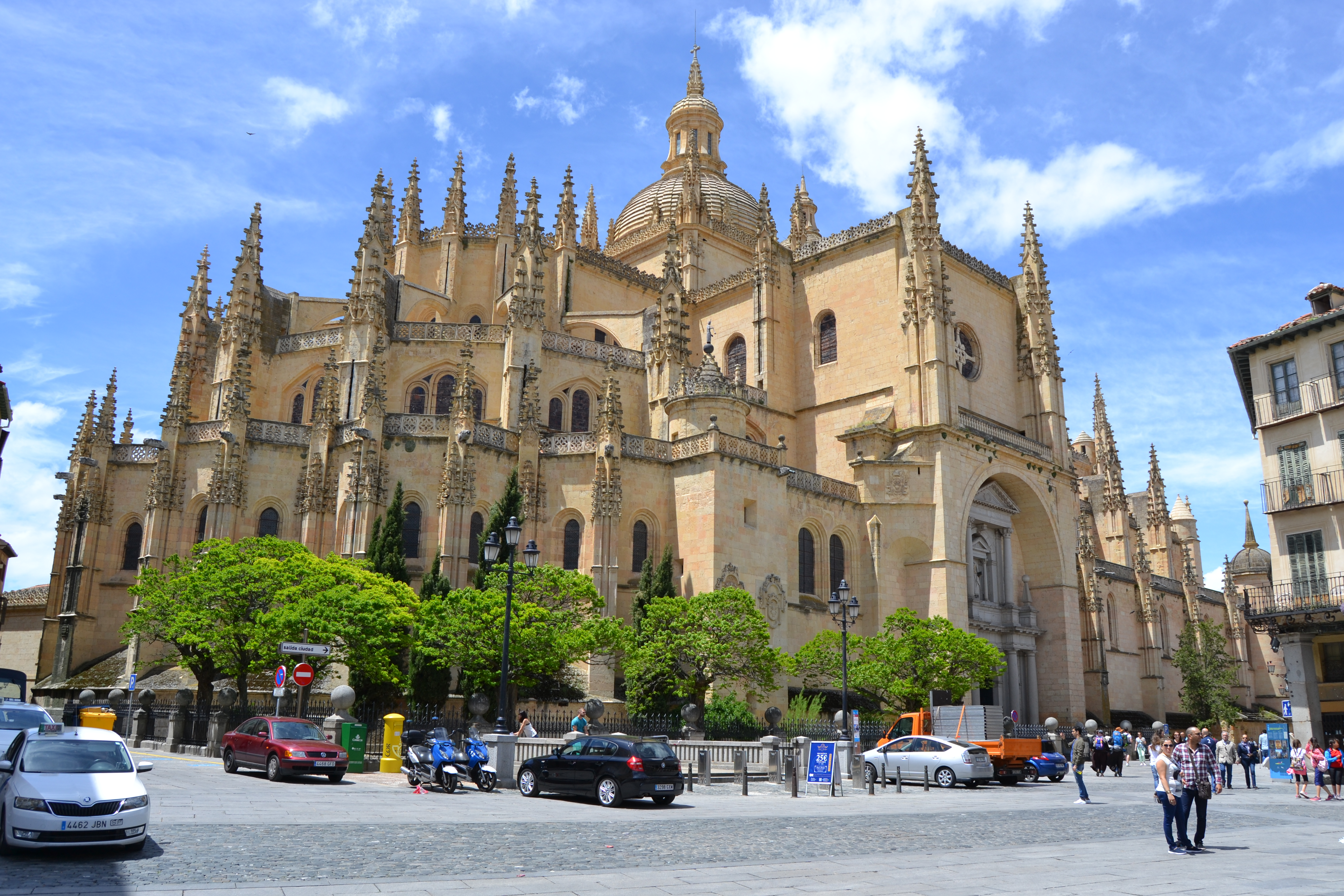
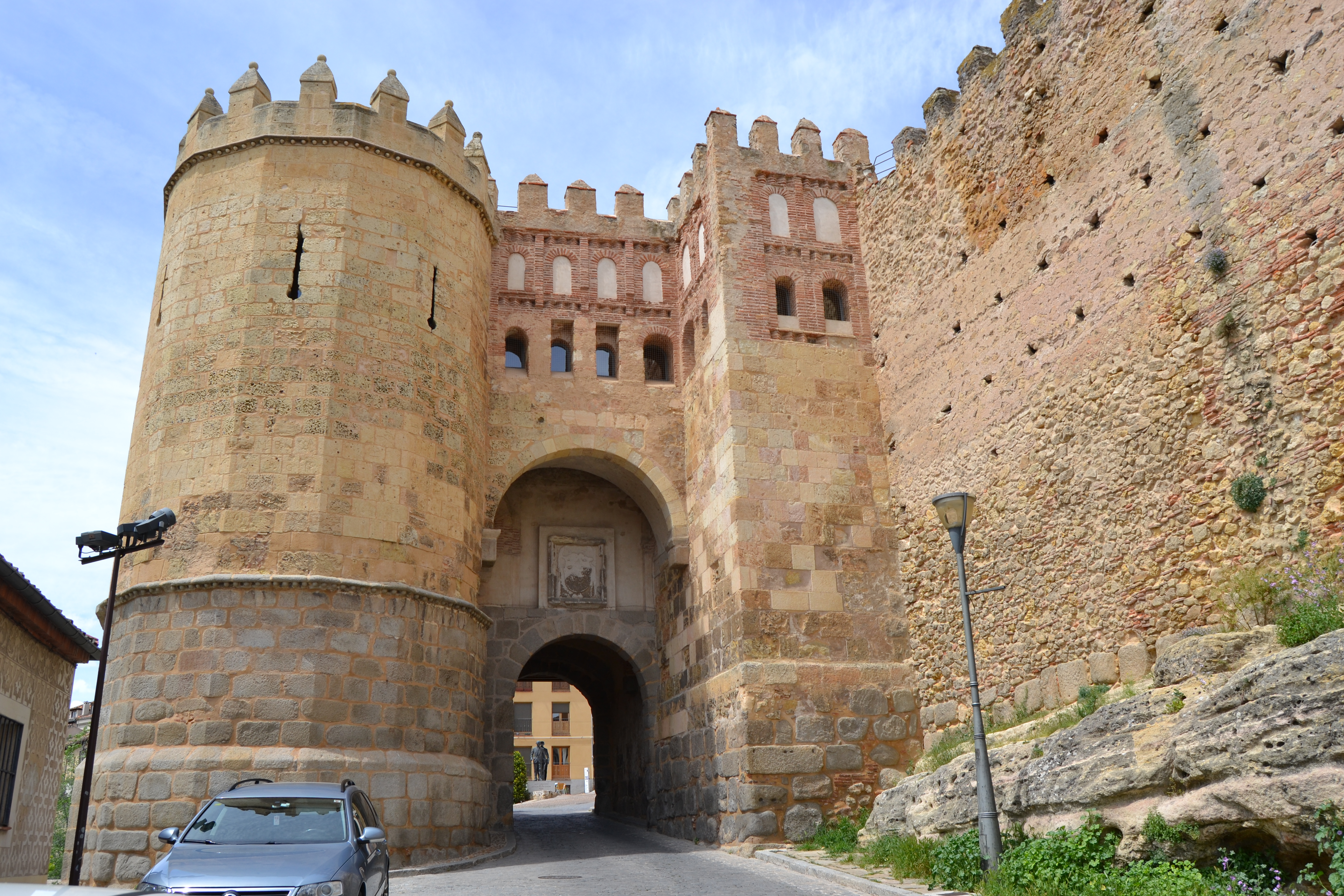
- View with the Sierra de Guadarrama in the background Alcázar Aqueduct Cathedral Gate of San Andrés

- Flag Coat of arms
- Location of Segovia
- Coordinates: 40°56′53″N 4°07′06″W
- Country: Spain
- Autonomous community: Castile and León
- Province: Segovia

Government
  - Type: Ayuntamiento
  - Body: Ayuntamiento de Segovia
  - Mayor: José Mazarías (PP)

Area
  - Total: 163.59 km^{2} (63.16 sq mi)
- Elevation: 1,005 m (3,297 ft)

Population (2025-01-01)
  - Total: 52,375
  - Density: 320.16/km^{2} (829.21/sq mi)
- Demonym(s): Segovian, segoviano/a
- Time zone: UTC+1 (CET)
  - Summer (DST): UTC+2 (CEST)
- Postal code: 40001-40006
- Website: Official website

Segovia (/sɪˈɡoʊviə/ sig-OH-vee-ə, US also /seɪˈ-/ say-GOH-, Spanish: [seˈɣoβja]) is a city in the autonomous community of Castile and León, Spain. It is the capital and most populated municipality of the Province of Segovia. Segovia is located in the Inner Plateau of the Iberian Peninsula, near the northern slopes of the Sistema Central mountain range. Housing is nestled on a bend of the Eresma river.

The city is famous for its historic buildings including three main landmarks: its midtown Roman aqueduct, its cathedral (one of the last ones to be built in Europe following a Gothic style), and the Alcázar of Segovia (a fortress). The city center was declared a World Heritage Site by UNESCO in 1985.

== Etymology ==
The name of Segovia is of Celtiberian origin. Although historians have linked its old name to Segobriga, the discovery of the original Roman city of Segobriga near Saelices discarded this possibility. The name of "Segovia" is mentioned by Livy in the context of the Sertorian War.

Under the Romans and Moors, the city was called Sego([u])via (Σεγουβία, (Note: the phonological use of β to denote the sound used in Spanish for b and v is modern. It was not used in European writing traditions (orthologies), except, as here, Greek which thus lacks the letter v.) Ptolomeo ii. 6. § 56) and Šiqūbiyyah (Note: The principle of b for lack of v in Arabic is identical) (شقوبية) respectively.

== Geography ==
=== Location ===
Segovia is located near the Eresma rivercourse (a second-order tributary of the Douro), close to the northwestern slope of the Sierra de Guadarrama mountains, a subrange of the Sistema Central.

The main route of the Camino de Santiago de Madrid passes through the city.

=== Climate ===
Segovia has a hot-summer Mediterranean climate (Csa in the Köppen climate classification) bordering on a cold semi-arid climate (BSk), resulting from the high altitude and the distance from the coast. The average annual temperature is 12.42 °C (54.4 °F), with an average low in January of 0.3 °C (32.5 °F) and an average high in July of 29.7 °C (85.5 °F). The annual precipitation ranges from 400 to 500 mm per year in the lower plains, and can reach above 1000 mm in the nearby mountainous area of the Sierra de Guadarrama, rain and snow are more frequent in the mountains. Showers from summer thunderstorms help the mountainous area of the province be wetter than the average for most of the central Spanish plateau, this gives the area lush vegetation. This makes the province a damp corner in the context of the region. The predominant forms of vegetation in the mountainous areas include pine, evergreen, oak, beech and juniper.

Climate data for Segovia (1988–2010) 1,005 metres (3,297 ft)
Month	Jan	Feb	Mar	Apr	May	Jun	Jul	Aug	Sep	Oct	Nov	Dec	Year
Record high °C (°F)	20.1 (68.2)	21.5 (70.7)	24.6 (76.3)	28.0 (82.4)	33.2 (91.8)	38.1 (100.6)	38.6 (101.5)	38.7 (101.7)	36.3 (97.3)	30.3 (86.5)	23.4 (74.1)	22.6 (72.7)	38.7 (101.7)
Mean daily maximum °C (°F)	8.2 (46.8)	10.4 (50.7)	13.9 (57.0)	15.1 (59.2)	19.7 (67.5)	25.8 (78.4)	29.7 (85.5)	29.4 (84.9)	24.0 (75.2)	18.0 (64.4)	11.8 (53.2)	8.8 (47.8)	17.9 (64.2)
Daily mean °C (°F)	4.3 (39.7)	5.8 (42.4)	8.6 (47.5)	9.7 (49.5)	14.0 (57.2)	19.0 (66.2)	22.2 (72.0)	22.1 (71.8)	17.7 (63.9)	13.0 (55.4)	7.6 (45.7)	5.1 (41.2)	12.4 (54.4)
Mean daily minimum °C (°F)	0.3 (32.5)	1.1 (34.0)	3.2 (37.8)	4.2 (39.6)	8.2 (46.8)	12.1 (53.8)	14.6 (58.3)	14.8 (58.6)	11.4 (52.5)	7.9 (46.2)	3.4 (38.1)	1.3 (34.3)	6.9 (44.4)
Record low °C (°F)	−17.0 (1.4)	−13.0 (8.6)	−13.2 (8.2)	−5.6 (21.9)	−3.0 (26.6)	0.4 (32.7)	4.0 (39.2)	4.4 (39.9)	0.6 (33.1)	−5.0 (23.0)	−10.4 (13.3)	−13.4 (7.9)	−17.0 (1.4)
Average precipitation mm (inches)	38 (1.5)	31 (1.2)	30 (1.2)	44 (1.7)	66 (2.6)	43 (1.7)	17 (0.7)	20 (0.8)	28 (1.1)	59 (2.3)	52 (2.0)	46 (1.8)	474 (18.6)
Average precipitation days	7	6	6	8	10	5	3	3	5	9	9	8	79
Average snowy days	3.8	3.1	1.7	1.5	0.2	0	0	0	0	0.1	1.6	2.2	14.2
Mean monthly sunshine hours	124	152	203	213	250	314	358	328	246	177	126	110	2,601
Source 1:
Source 2:

=== Population centers ===
Aside from the main city, there are a number of other villages within the municipality of Segovia.

- Fuentemilanos
- Hontoria
- Madrona
- Revenga, established in 1983 as a "minor local entity" (Spanish: entidad local menor), a category of sub-municipal entities in Spain.
- Zamarramala
- Torredondo
- Perogordo

== History ==
The first recorded mention of a settlement in what is today Segovia was a Celtic possession. Control later passed into the hands of the Romans. The city is a possible site of the battle in 75 BC where Quintus Caecilius Metellus Pius was victorious over Quintus Sertorius and Hirtuleius. Hirtuleius died in the fighting. During the late Roman period, the settlement belonged to one of numerous contemporary Latin convents.

Later records traditionally indicate that the townsite was uninhabited at the height of the 11th century. The circumstances behind the resettlement of the northern Meseta beyond the Douro (vis-à-vis the pre-Reconquesta population) under the advancing Christian kingdoms in the middle ages is, however, a moot point in historiography. Short of the existence of any verified urban layout in the townsite, possible early eleventh century Berber or Mozarab settlements in the area seem likely.

After the conquest of Toledo by Alfonso VI of León and Castile, Segovia was resettled with Christians from the north of the Iberian peninsula and beyond the Pyrenees, providing it with a significant sphere of influence whose boundaries crossed the Sierra de Guadarrama and the Tagus.

Segovia's position on trading routes made it an important centre of trade in wool and textiles. The end of the Middle Ages saw something of a golden age for Segovia, with a growing Jewish population and the creation of a foundation for a powerful cloth industry. Several splendid works of Gothic architecture were also completed during this period. Notably, Isabella I was proclaimed queen of Castile in the church of San Miguel de Segovia on December 13, 1474. Segovienne was a local flannel cloth used for upholstery in the 14th to 17th centuries. It was a twilled weave structure with a hairy surface produced by using Spanish wool.

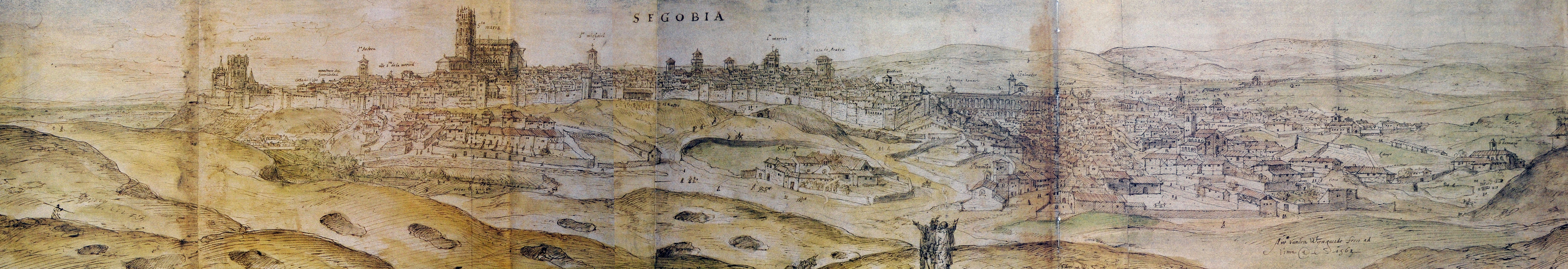
Drawing of Segovia ('Segobia') by Anton van den Wyngaerde c. 1562.

Like most Castilian textile centres, Segovia joined the Revolt of the Comuneros under the command of Juan Bravo. Despite the defeat of the Communities, the city's resultant economic boom continued into the sixteenth century, its population rising to 27,000 in 1594. Then, as well as almost all the cities of Castile, Segovia entered a period of decline. Only a century later in 1694, the population had been reduced to only 8,000 inhabitants. In the early eighteenth century, Segovia attempted to revitalize its textile industry, with little success. In the second half of the century, Charles III made another attempt to revive the region's commerce; it took the form of the Royal Segovian Wool Manufacturing Company (1763). However, the lack of competitiveness of production caused the crown withdraw its sponsorship in 1779. In 1764, the Royal School of Artillery, the first military academy in Spain, was opened. This academy remains present in the city today. In 1808, Segovia was sacked by French troops during the War of Independence. During the First Carlist War, troops under the command of Don Carlos, Count of Molina unsuccessfully attacked the city. During the nineteenth and first half of the twentieth century, Segovia experienced a demographic recovery that was the result of relative economic stability.

== Demographics ==
Historical population
Year	Pop.	±%
1842	6,625	—
1857	10,339	+56.1%
1877	11,172	+8.1%
1887	14,328	+28.2%
1900	14,658	+2.3%
1910	15,258	+4.1%
1920	15,707	+2.9%
1930	18,413	+17.2%
1940	21,951	+19.2%
1950	27,026	+23.1%
1960	32,092	+18.7%
1970	40,816	+27.2%
1981	50,759	+24.4%
1991	54,375	+7.1%
2001	54,368	−0.0%
2011	54,945	+1.1%
2021	51,234	−6.8%
Source: INE

The population growth experienced during the nineteenth century accelerated steadily beginning around 1920: 16,013 inhabitants recorded that year, 33,360 in 1960, and 53,237 in 1981. Since the 1980s growth has slowed markedly: 55,586 in 2004 and 56,047 in 2007.

As of 1 January 2019, 11% of Segovia's inhabitants were foreigners – 4.478% coming from other countries in Europe, 2.37% being Africans, 3.7% being from the Americas, and 0.435% being Asians.

== Heritage ==
=== World Heritage City ===
Old Town of Segovia and its Aqueduct
UNESCO World Heritage Site
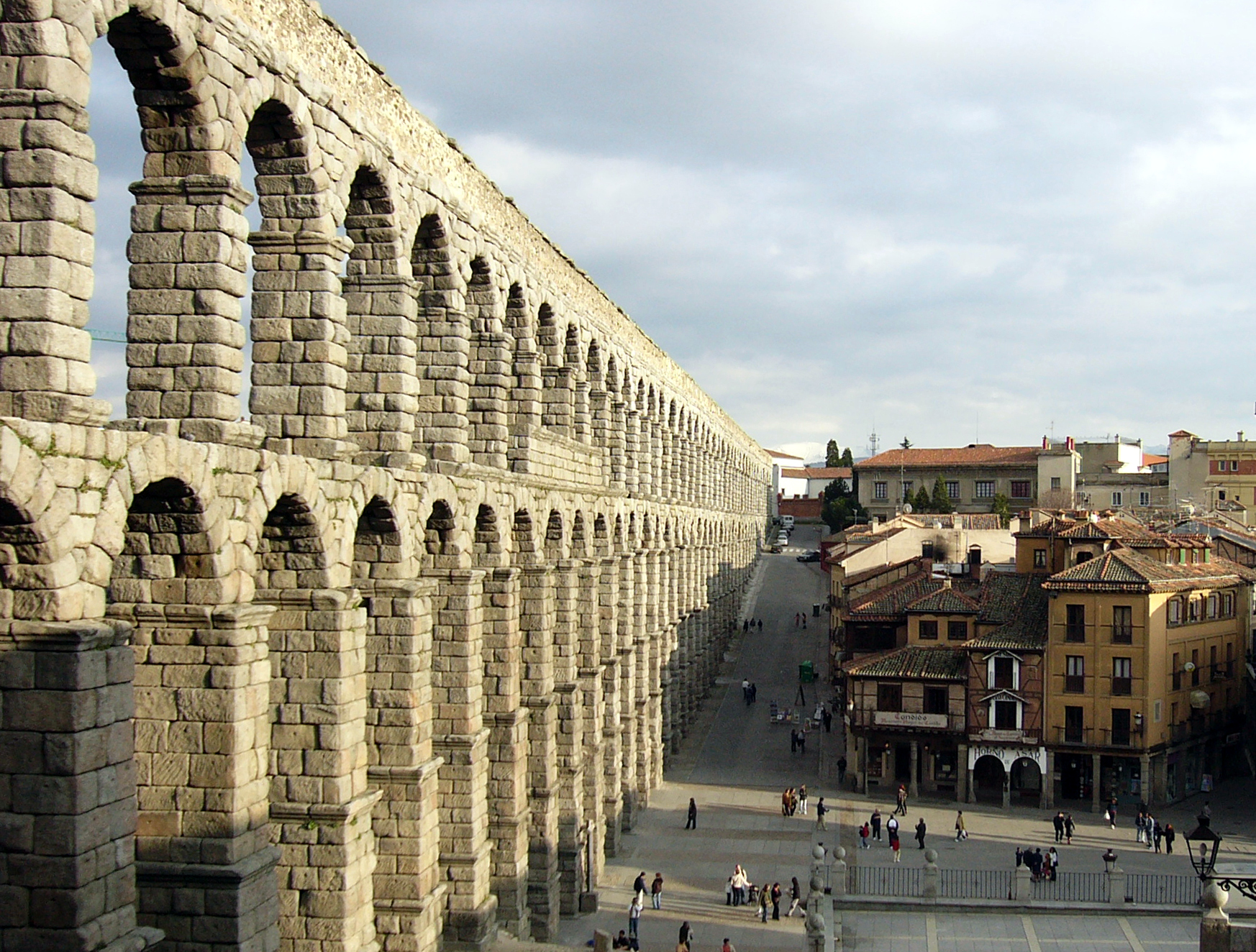
- The Roman Aqueduct of Segovia
- Interactive map of Old Town of Segovia and its Aqueduct
- Criteria: Cultural: i, iii, iv
- Reference: 311
- Inscription: 1985 (9th Session)
- Area: 134.28 ha (331.8 acres)
- Buffer zone: 401.44 ha (992.0 acres)

In 1985 the old city of Segovia and its Aqueduct were declared World Heritage Sites by UNESCO. The old city contains a multitude of historic buildings both civil and religious, including a large number of buildings of Jewish origin, notably within the old Jewish Quarter. One of the most historically important Jewish sites is the Jewish cemetery, El Pinarillo. Among the most important monuments in the city are:

- The Aqueduct of Segovia, located in Plaza del Azoguejo, is the defining historical feature of the city, dating from the late 1st or early 2nd century AD. Like a number of other aqueducts in Spain, Segovia's Roman-built aqueduct receives attention for being one of the "extraordinary engineering accomplishments" existing in the country, wrote Alejandro Lapunzina in Reference Guides to National Architecture: Architecture of Spain. It is still used to deliver drinking water. "The aqueduct of Segovia is – because of its long span, architectural beauty, uncharacteristic slenderness, and dramatic presence in the center of a dense urban fabric – the most impressive Roman structure in Spain, and one of the most famous among the numerous aqueducts built by the Romans throughout their vast Empire," Lapunzina wrote. It consists of about 25,000 granite blocks held together without any mortar, and spans 818 meters with more than 170 arches, the highest being 29 metres high.

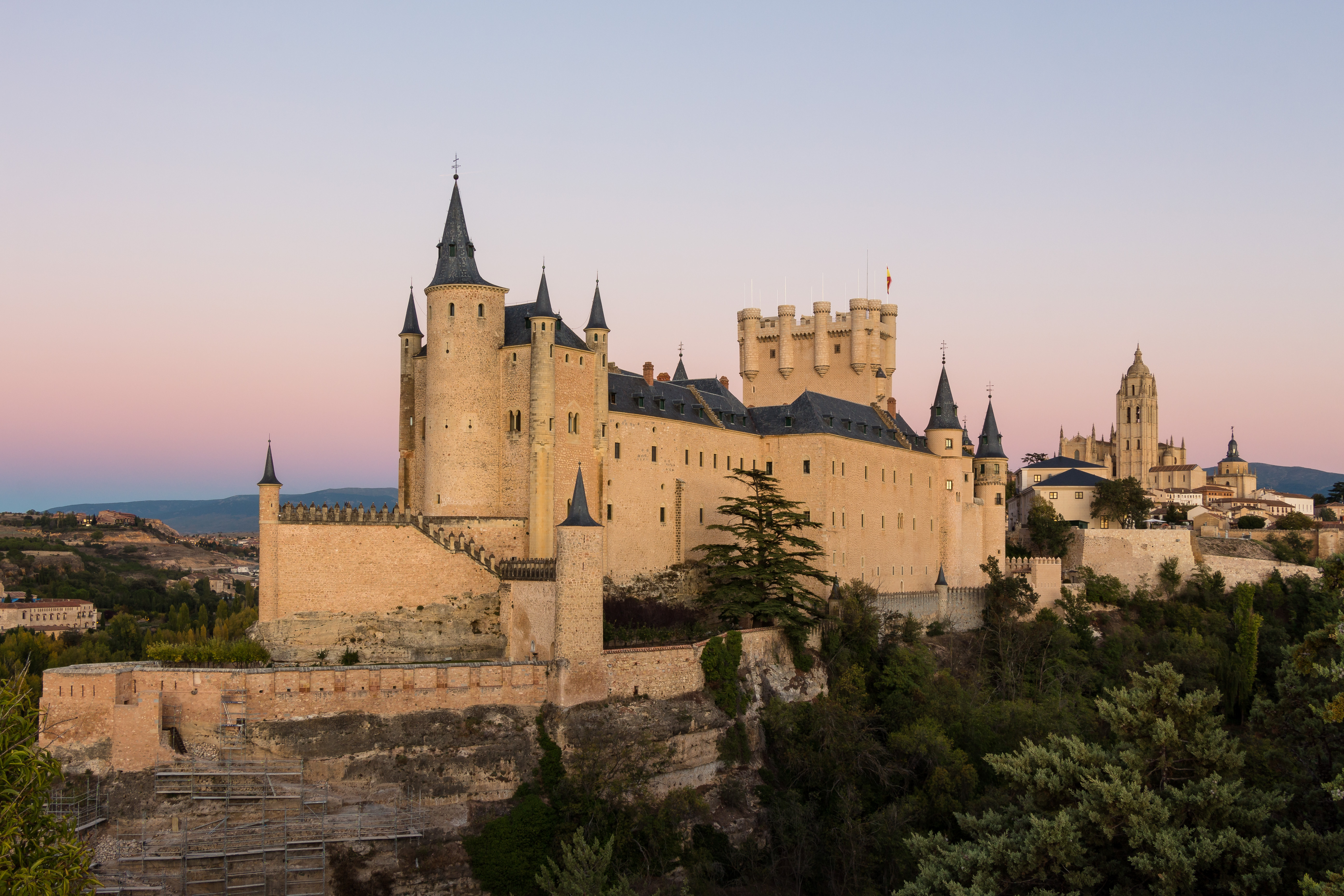
The Alcázar de Segovia.

- The Alcazar of Segovia, the royal palace built on a stone peninsula between the rivers Eresma and Clamores, is documented for the first time in 1122, although it may have existed earlier. It was one of the favored residences of the kings of Castile, built in the transition from Romanesque architecture to Gothic and Mudéjar. The building is structured around two courtyards and has two towers, and a keep. It was a favourite residence of Alfonso X the Wise and Henry IV, and Isabella the Catholic was crowned Queen of Castile in Segovia's Plaza Mayor. Devastated by a fire in 1862, it was later rebuilt. It now houses the General Militar de Segovia archive and museum of the Royal School of Artillery, managed by the Board of the Alcazar.

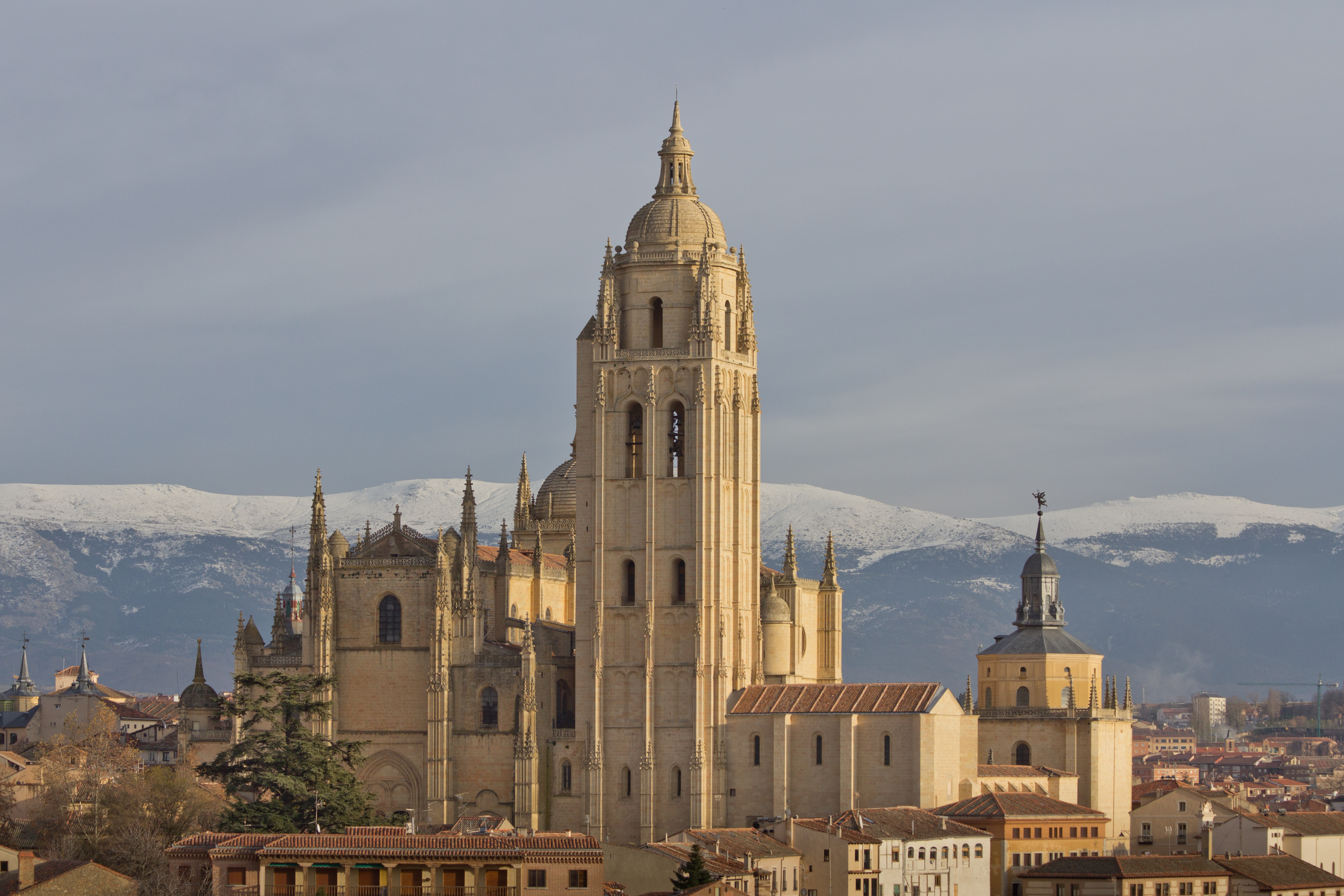
Segovia Cathedral as seen from the Alcazar.

- The Segovia Cathedral, the last Gothic cathedral built in Spain. It is considered a masterpiece of Basque-Castilian Gothic architecture and is known as "The Lady of Cathedrals". Juan Gil de Hontañón, Rodrigo Gil de Hontañón, and other masters of Spanish architecture worked on the construction. It was consecrated in 1768 and is 105 meters long, 50 metres wide and 33 m high in the nave, has 18 chapels and has three doors: El Perdón, San Frutos and San Geroteo.
- The Walls of Segovia existed when Alfonso VI of León and Castile retook the city from the Arabs. Alfonso had them enlarged, and also increased its perimeter to 3 kilometres, with eight towers, five gates, and several doors. It was built mainly of granite blocks but also reused gravestones from the old Roman necropolis. The wall encircles the historic quarter and currently has three gates: San Cebrián; Santiago, built in the Mudéjar style; and San Andrés, gateway to the Jewish quarter; and the breaches of Consuelo, San Juan, the Sun, and the Moon.

=== Religious architecture ===
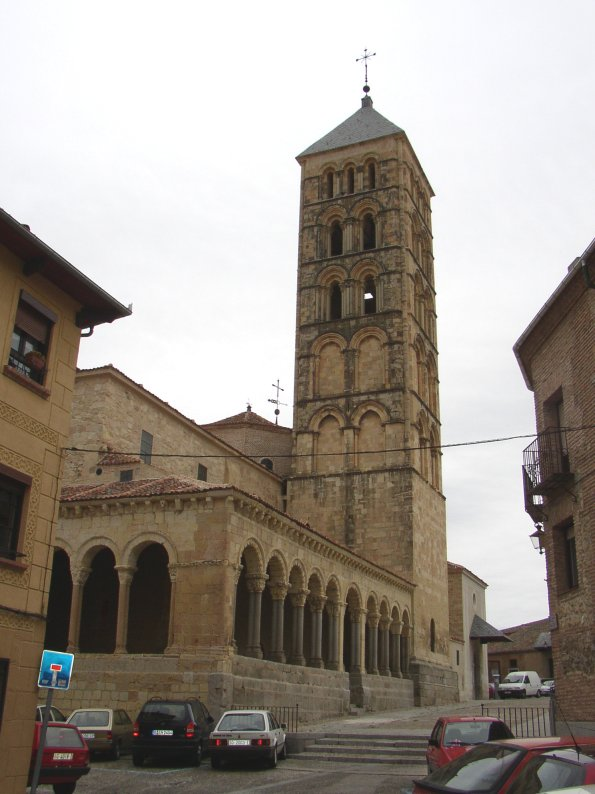
Iglesia de San Esteban

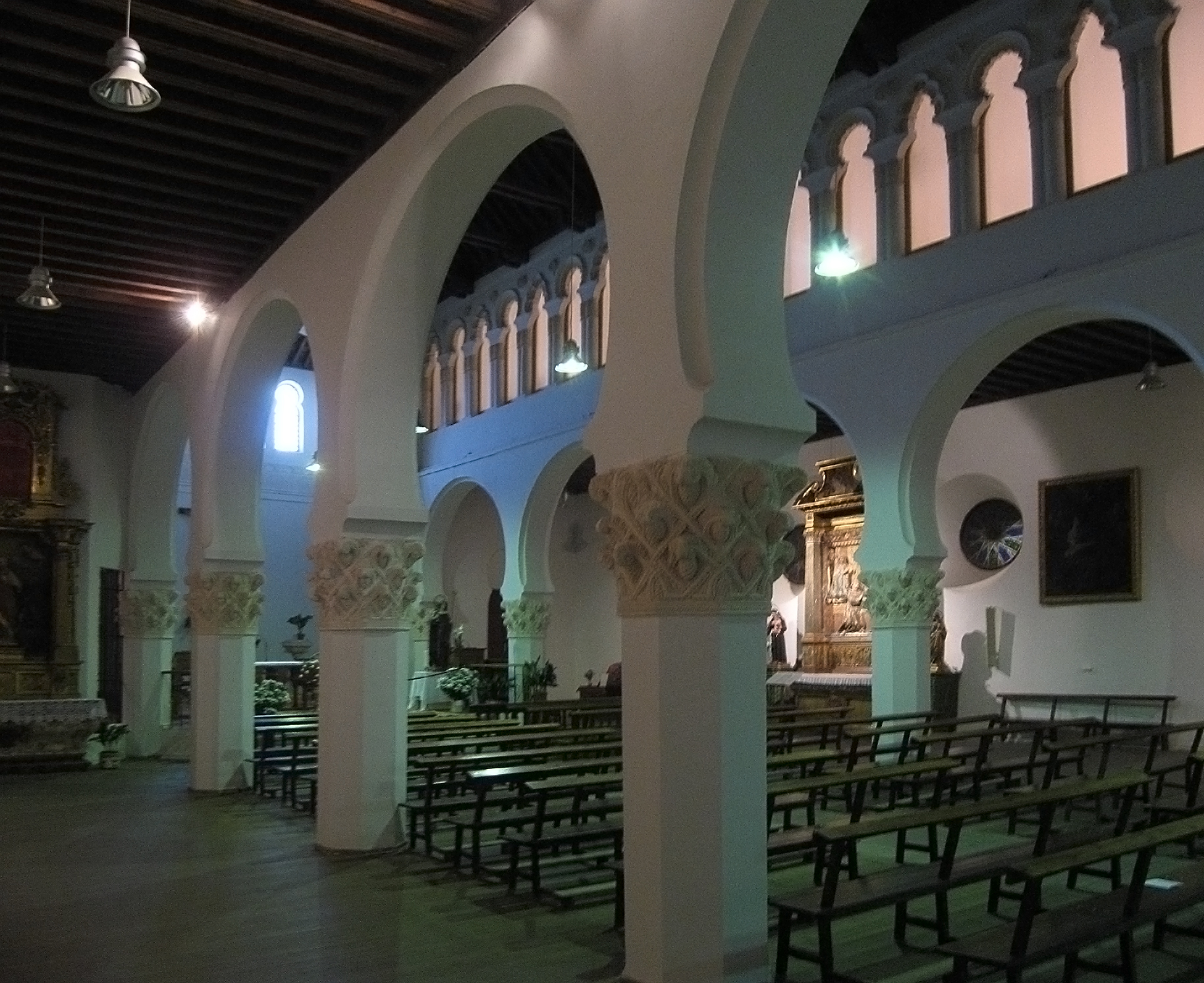
Old main synagogue

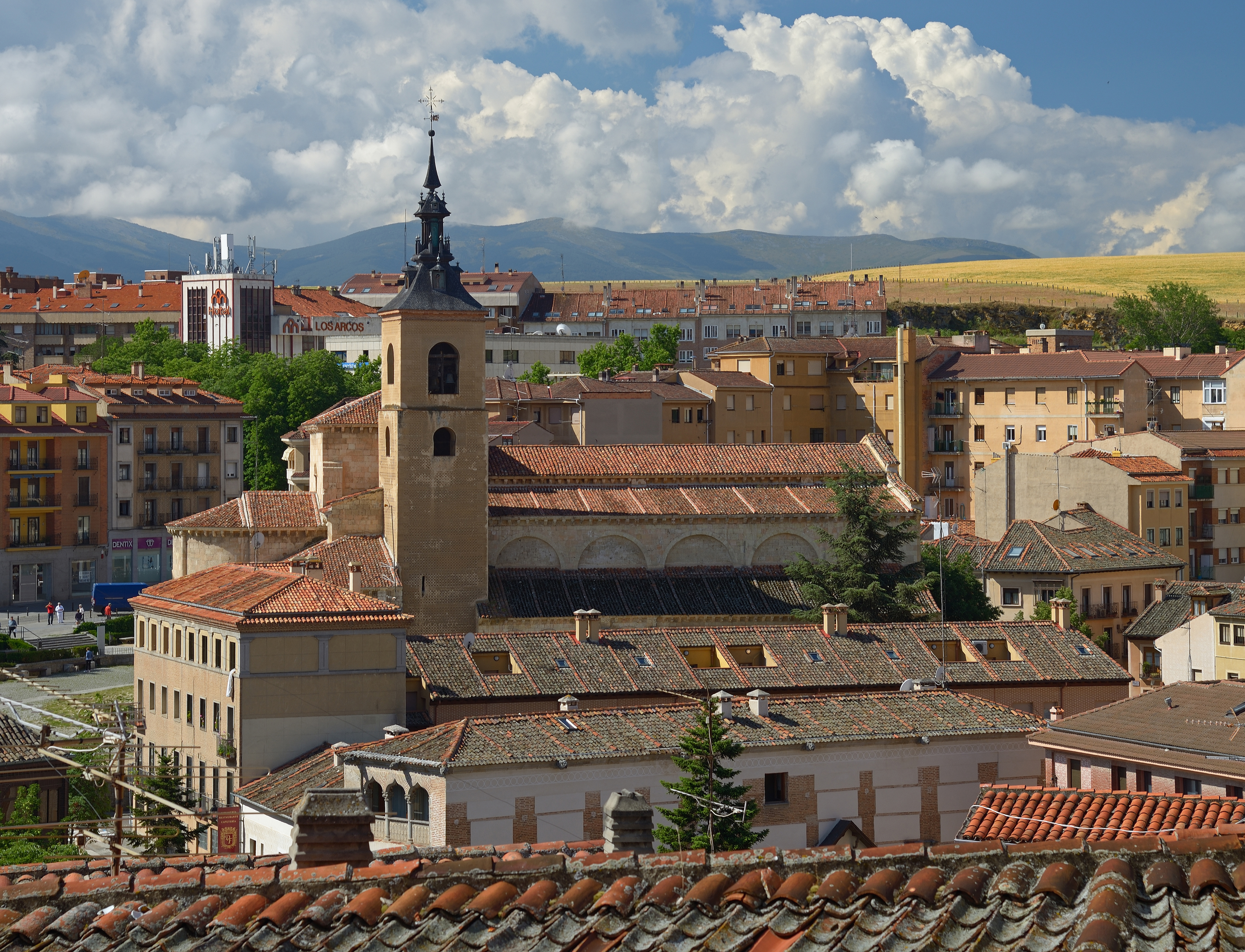
View of the church of San Millán de Segovia from Cervantes street

==== Churches and chapels ====
The city maintains an important collection of Romanesque churches of both stone and brick, which include the churches of San Esteban, San Millán, San Martín, la Santísima Trinidad, San Andrés, San Clemente, Santos Justo y Pastor, Iglesia de la Vera Cruz (Order of Malta), and San Salvador.

The old main synagogue is a former synagogue, converted into a convent after the expulsion of the Jews from Spain in 1492.

==== Monasteries and convents ====
The city of Segovia preserved also several monasteries and convents with active religious life:

- The Monastery of Saint Mary of Parral with the cloistered monks of the Order of Saint Jerome
- The Monastery of the Humble Incarnation with the cloistered nuns of the Order of Saint Augustine
- The Monastery of the Immaculate Conception with the cloistered Conceptionist nuns
- The Monastery of San Vicente el Real with the cloistered nuns of the Cistercian Order
- The Monastery of San Antonio el Real with the Poor Clare Sisters of the Order of Saint Claire
- The Convent of Saint John of the Cross with the Discalced Carmelite friars
- The Convent of Saint Joseph with the cloistered Discalced Carmelite nuns
- The Convent of Corpus Christi with the Poor Clare Sisters of the Order of Saint Claire
- The Convent of Santo Domingo el Real with the cloistered nuns of the Dominican Order
- The Convent of Saint John of God with the Franciscan Sisters of the Third Order of Saint Francis
- The Convent of Santa Cruz la Real (occupied by IE University).

=== Civil architecture ===
- The Ayala Berganza Castilian Palace dates from the late 15th century. Due to a multiple murder that happened in the late 19th century is known by Segovia as "the house of crime".
- Casa del Sello on San Francisco Street
- Casa-Museo del Torreón de Lozoya in the Plaza de San Martín
- Casa del Siglo XV (or of Juan Bravo)
- House of the Count Alpuente, the Casa de los Picos and others in the Calle Real
- La Taberna Rubi, the oldest tavern in the city
- The Casa de la Moneda, a former mint included in the "production and manufacturing" theme of the European Route of Industrial Heritage.

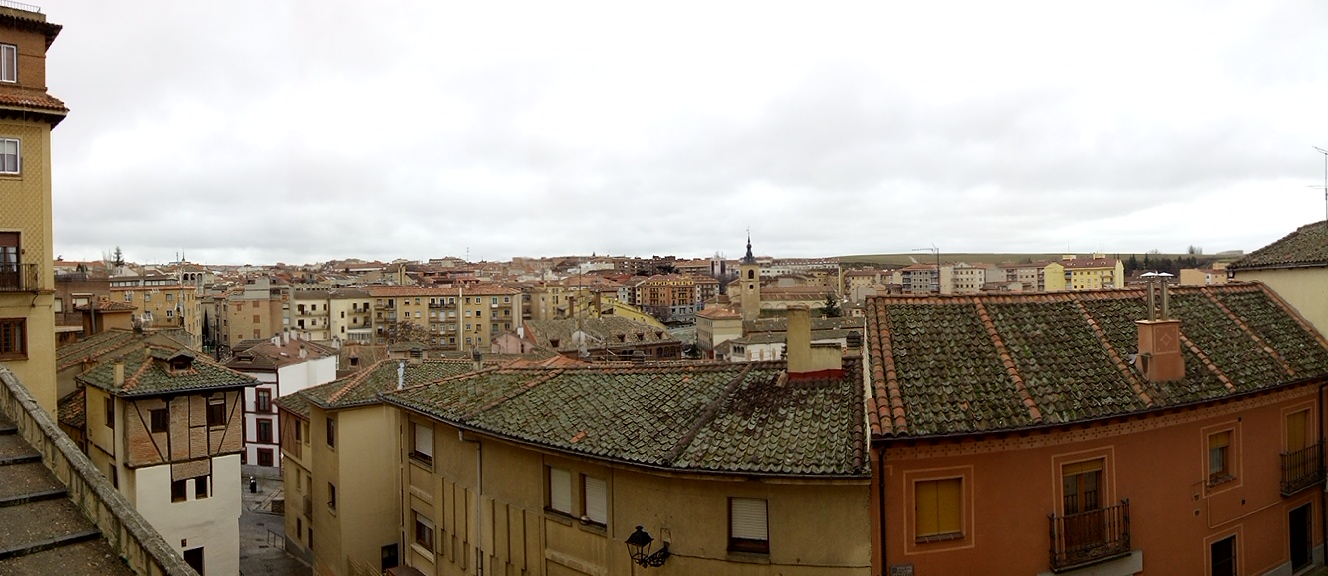
View of Segovia from Mirador de la canaleja.

=== Urban sculpture ===
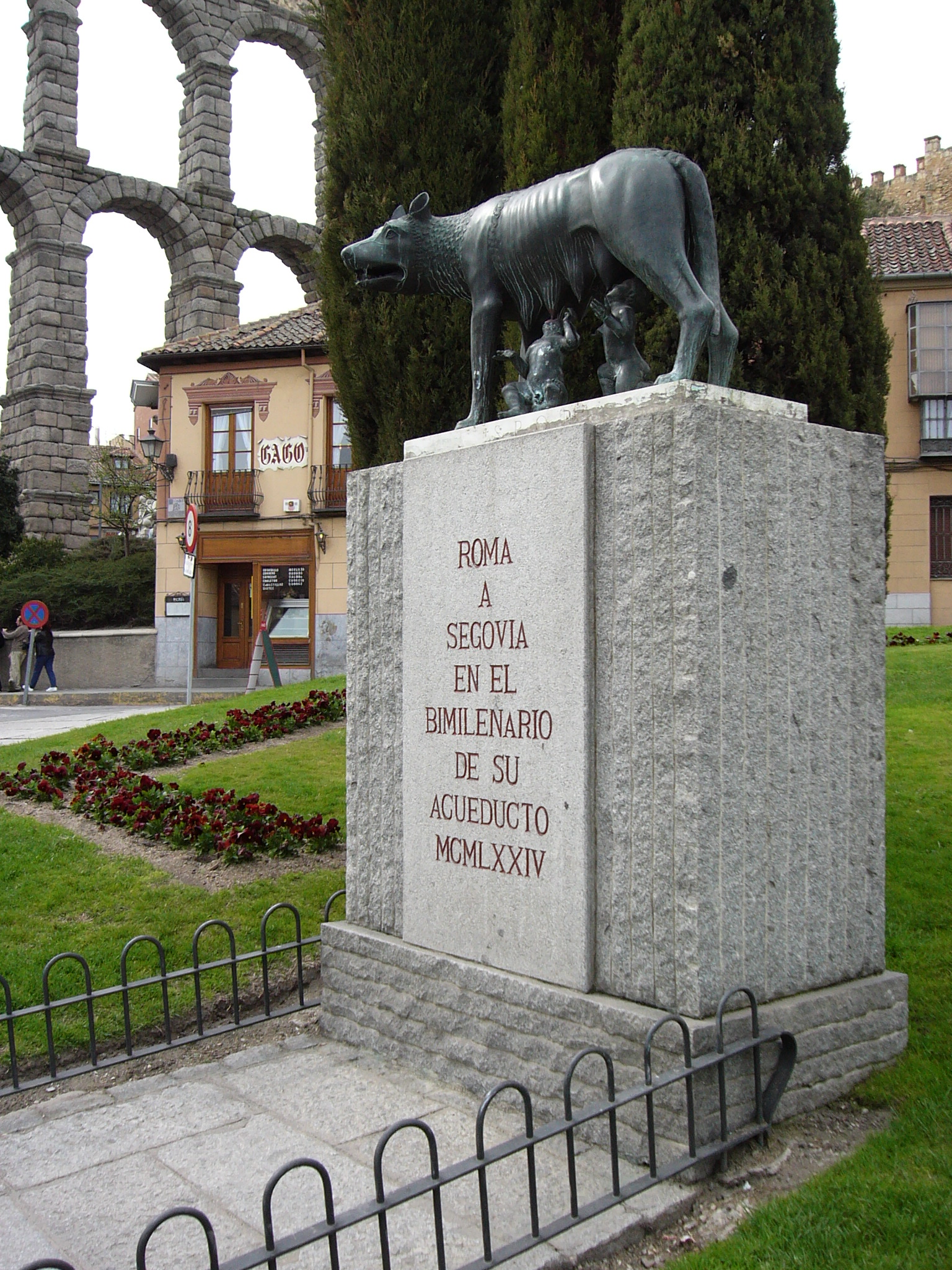
Loba Capitolina at the foot of the aqueduct.

Urban sculpture in Segovia feature works depicting illustrious figures linked to the city, but there are also several works of a religious nature. One of the most iconic sculptures of the Loba Capitolina sits in front of the aqueduct. A copy of the Capitoline wolf is preserved in the Capitoline Museum and was a gift that Rome gave to the city in 1974 during the events of the bimillennial anniversary of the aqueduct.

Until a few decades ago, a monument dedicated to the artist Daniel Zuloaga, which was installed in 1924, could be seen in the Plaza de la Merced, but it was relocated to the Plaza de Colmenares. Currently located in the center of the Plaza de la Merced, looking towards the church of San Andrés is a bust of the poet Rubén Darío, sculptor Santiago de Santiago, which was donated by the Nicaragua government to the city in 1973. Letters related to the bust are also found in the Promenade Lounge, the famous poet José Rodas was first installed in 1927 in the plaza of the gardens, and moved to its present site in 1960 by the Segovian sculptor Aniceto Marinas. There is also a tribute to Antonio Machado; the poet Segovia also took refuge here from 1919 to 1932, a sculpture honoring him is located in the garden of his home museum, and was done by Emiliano Barral.

Religious figures such as Domingo de Soto, Pius XII, Saint Anthony Mary Claret, Saint John of the Cross have their own urban sculptures, including the first work of Ortega and several from José María García Moro, a prosperous Segovia sculptor who also created the Monument to the Youth located on the Plaza del Conde de Cheste. A few peasants have been recognized on the streets or town squares, as is the case for Aniceto Marinas, who dedicated a monument in 1943 to his friend and partner Mariano Benlliure.

In the field of arms is the monument to Daoíz and Velarde, Aniceto Marina's work. By the same artist is the sculpture dedicated to the list of people associated with the comunero Juan Bravo, made in 1921 and located in the heart of the city at the Square of the Sirens, the name given to two statues that top the stairs representing the mythological beings, which were made by Francisco Bellver in 1852. Other sculptures in the city include one devoted to physician Andrés Laguna made by the Segovian Florentino Trapero and located at Plaza de los Huertos, the bust of Lope de la Calle Martín, president of the provincial council, that was made by Emiliano Barral and can be seen in the square of San Facundo, or the monument "El Favorito" by Toribio García de Andrés in the early 20th century.

In addition to this series of monuments and sculptures some other religious images worth mentioning can be found in the quieter corners of the city. The most significant of these is the Virgin of the Aqueduct, located in the central niche of the monument at the Plaza del Azoguejo since the 16th century; it memorializes Colmenares. A series of virgins can also be found at the Fuencisla on Velarde Street, the los Remedios in front of San Juan Gate, the Socorro at the San Andrés Gate and the del Carmen on the street of its own name, among others.

Segovia also has a work by Luis Sanguino, who lives in the city. It is "El Mesonero Mayor de Castilla" ("The Elder Hotelkeeper of Castile"), at the Plaza del Santo Espíritu.

=== Parks and gardens ===
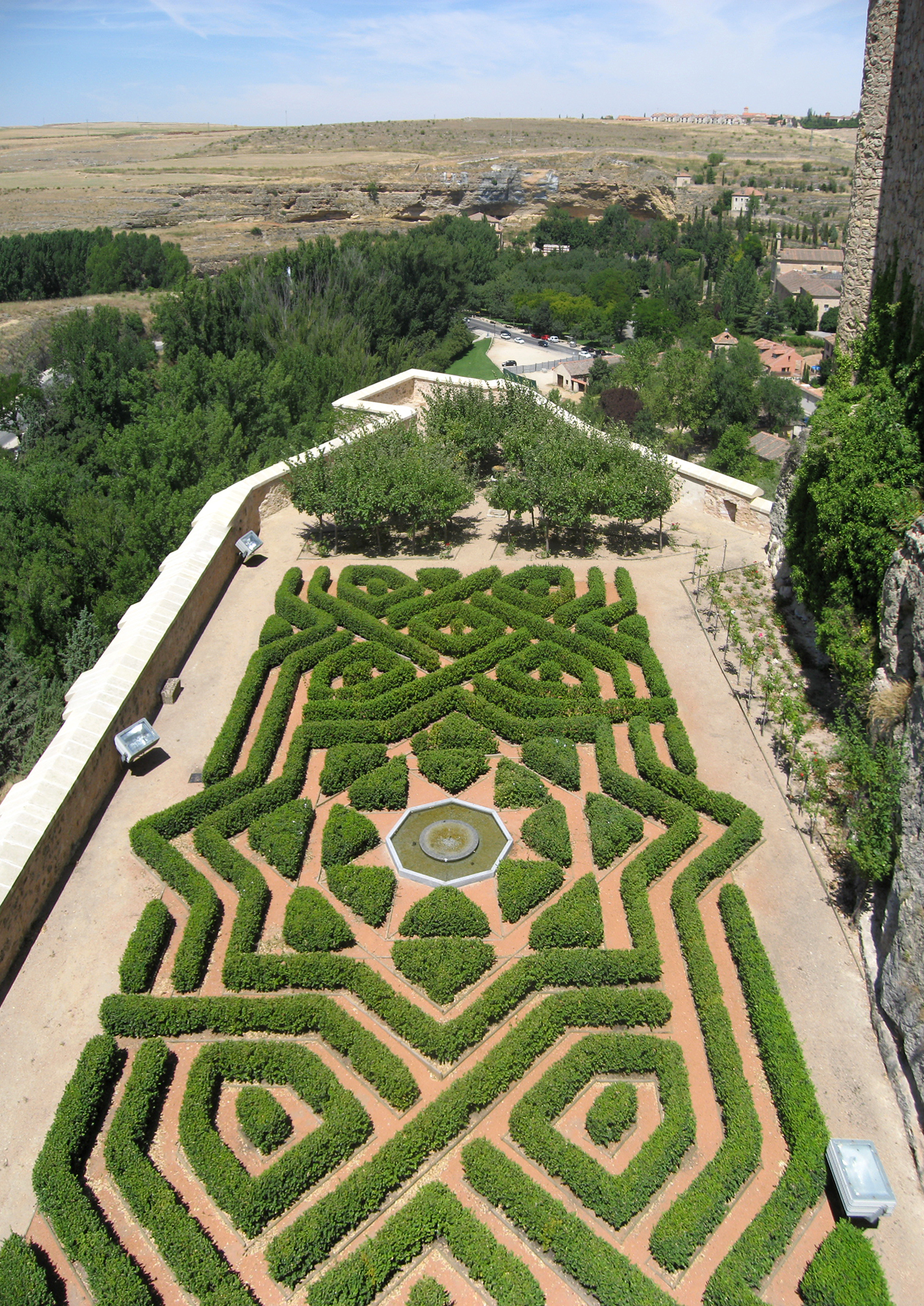
Alcazar Gardens.

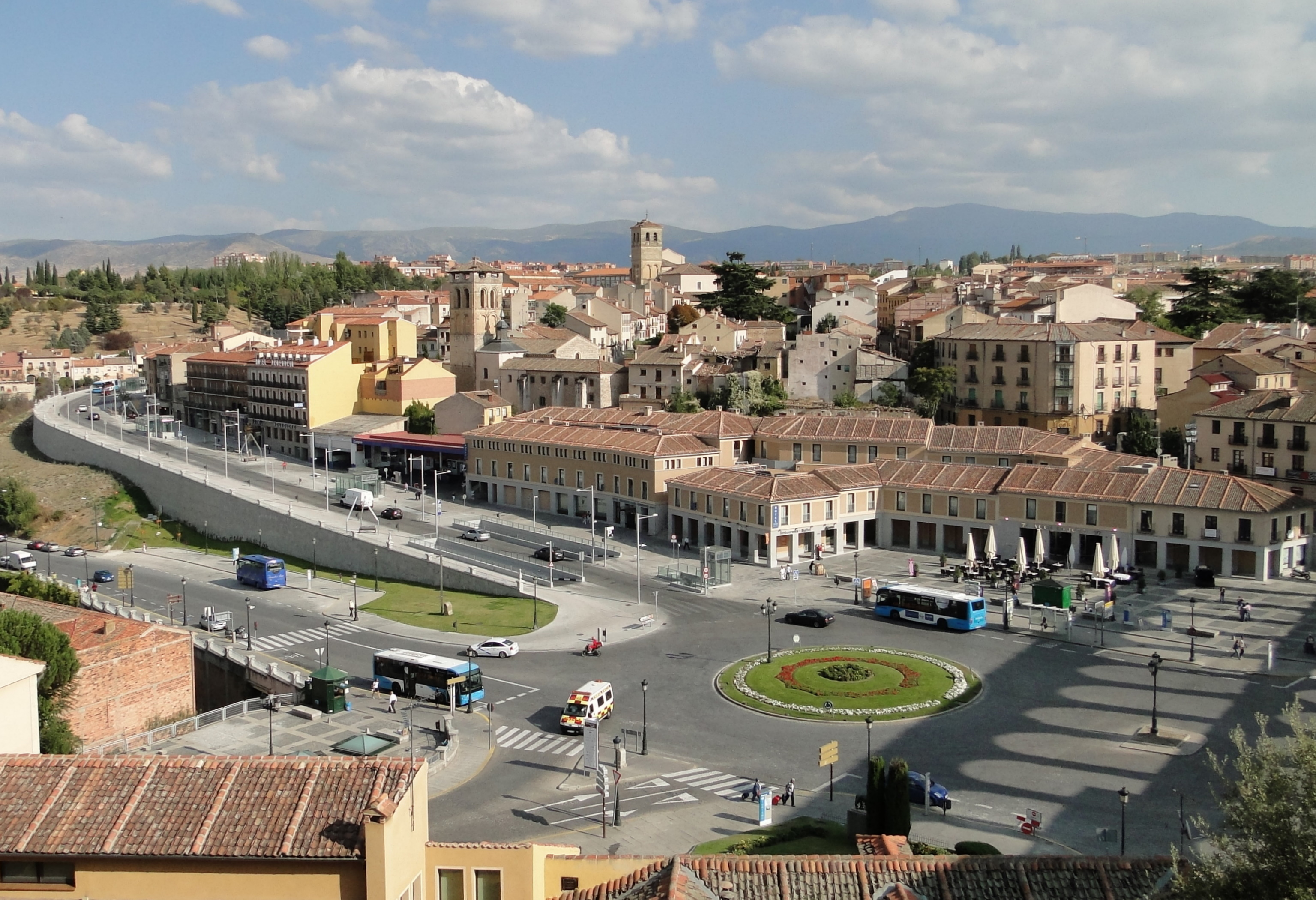
Plaza de la Artillería

- The Alcazar Gardens was built in the plaza where the Old Cathedral and the Episcopal Palace existed before and was created on the occasion of the marriage of Philip II to Anne of Austria in 1570, removing the ruins that still existed. This, however, was not fully realized until the visit of Ferdinand VI in the 18th century. Between 1816 and 1817 the first trees were planted, and enclosed with the fence that currently exists. They were destroyed by the fire suffered by the palace in 1862, and recovered again in 1882.
- The Garden of la Merced was the first public garden carried out by the city within the city walls. Named after the former Mercy convent that was located in the same place and came into existence in the middle 19th century with the planting of trees and installation of a fountain, later replaced by the current, broader and statelier plaza. There is also a child's playground available.
- Paseo del Salón is one of the oldest gardens in the city, since it was created in 1786 by the Economic Society of Friends of the Country of Segovia, and two years later they began planting trees. In 1846 he set up various sources and replanted again in different species.
- Jardinillos of San Roque, situated along the so-called "Paseo Nuevo" were open to the public in 1872, but ten years before a public fountain was placed in them. In 1943 they were the place where stood a pavilion dedicated to the Feria de Muestras, the building still stands and is one of the characteristic features of the gardens.
- Missionaries, The Garden of los Cañuelos
- The Gardens of los Huertos are named for the orchards occupy a premonstratensian friary. After the removal of the convent in 1836 with the first disentailment laws, the city claimed ownership of the land, a fact that occurred in 1897. In 1901 he began planting trees and structuring of the gardens, which has gradually been restored today.
- Alameda del Eresma
- Alameda de la Fuencisla
- Fromkes Garden
- Garden of la Plaza del Conde Alpuente
- Garden of la Plaza de Colmenares
- Garden of St. Augustine
- Parque de la Albuera
- Parque de la Dehesa
- Pinarillo de la Cuesta de los Hoyos
- Clamores Valley

== Economy ==
The economy of Segovia revolves around metallurgy, agriculture, furniture, construction and tourism. The town itself plays host to thousands of day trippers from Madrid each year due to its popular attractions.

== Transport ==
Segovia is served by the Autopista AP-61 which opened in 2004. Segovia-Guiomar railway station provides a rail connection to Madrid Chamartín and Valladolid-Campo Grande via the AVE network's Madrid–León high-speed rail line. Direct train travel from Madrid stations to Segovia is approximately 30 minutes. There is no airport in the city, the nearest airport is Madrid–Barajas Airport, located 104 km (65 mi) south east of Segovia.

== Education ==
The city of Segovia is home to a large number of primary schools and secondary schools, the oldest of which (IES Andrés Laguna, founded in 1841) having been officially declared "of cultural interest". A high proportion of the student population attends state primary and secondary schools, while private schooling in Segovia is mostly religious in nature.

Segovia's premier higher education institution is IE University, a business-oriented undergraduate university, building upon Instituto Empresa's successful MBA program at Madrid-based IE Business School. Also present is the Segovia campus of the University of Valladolid, offering studies for careers in computer engineering, law, journalism, advertising and education.

== Culture ==
=== Museums ===
- Gastronomic Museum of Segovia
- Museum of Segovia.
- Museum of Contemporary Art 'Esteban Vicente'
- Museum of the Bishop's Palace
- Museum del Pasado
- Museum of the Cathedral
- Museum Zuloaga
- House-Museum of Antonio Machado
- Museum of the Rodera-Robles Foundation
- Museum of Witch Craft
- Museum of Arms
- Museum of the Walls of Segovia
- Jewish Center

=== MUCES ===
MUCES (Muestra de Cine Europeo Ciudad de Segovia) is the Spanish acronym to The City of Segovia Festival of European Cinema, an annual film festival which takes place in the city since 2006, usually in November. It gives the wider public a chance to get to know quality European cinema and, above all, it offers the general public an opportunity to see European films which have not yet been commercially screened in Spain, but have been very successful with critics and audiences in their own countries. "My Cat Lives in Segovia" is one of the films presented to the audience.

=== Festivities ===
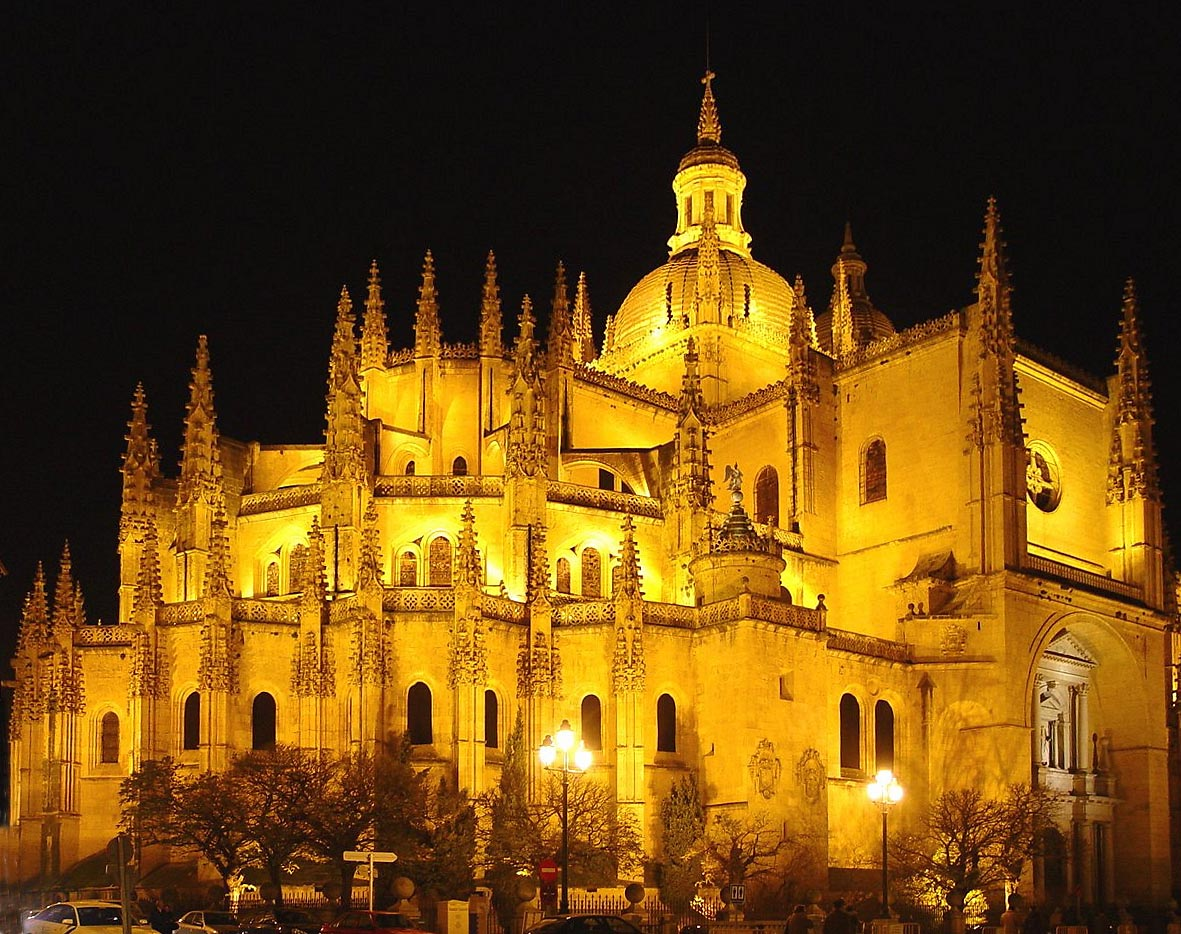
Facade of the cathedral night view.

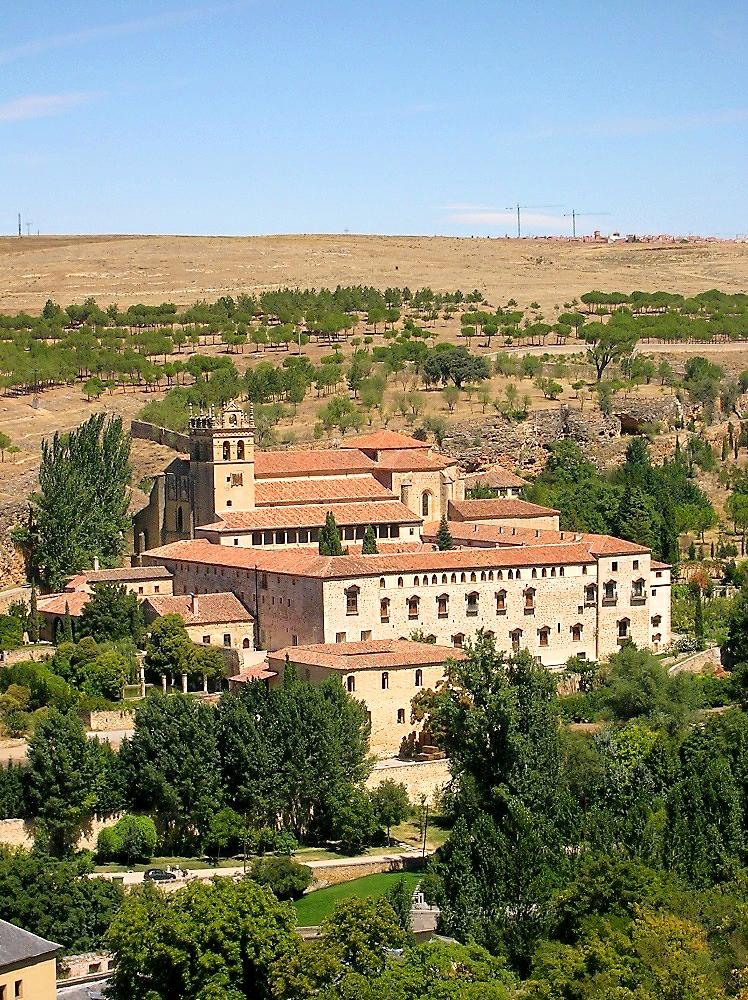
Monastery of Saint Mary of Parral.

- San Lorenzo (around August 10). It is the feast of one of the neighborhoods in the city.
- Fairs and Festivals of San Juan and San Pedro (late June). These feasts have been held since the 15th century.
- San Frutos (October 25): Patron saint of Segovia. At mid-morning the Carol of San Frutos is sung in the cathedral, after which there are often various activities in the Plaza Mayor, as a proclamation, a concert by the Band of the Segovian Musical Union, mycology exhibition, etc. In recent years, following the established tradition of drawn traditions of the sleeve, Segovia's pastry chefs have invented a dessert of the saint. On the last night to San Frutos the segovian congregate at the image of the saint who is at the door of the cathedral to see him turning the page of the book that she holds.
- Virgin of the Fuencisla (September 25): Patroness of Segovia. The biggest celebration day takes place during the last Sunday of the month. Two Thursdays before the Virgin up from her sanctuary in the Alameda of the Fuencisla to the cathedral to start the novena (her arrival at the Plaza Mayor is one of the most specific ones to be found in Segovia; it is typical to arrive when the clock of the Town Hall rings). During the following nine days, the novena in the cathedral is celebrated, when the Hymn of the Fuencisla is sung, and on the last Sunday the Virgin is returned to her shrine. Since the Virgin is Captain General of Artillery (indicated by the baton and the sash at her feet) from September 24, 1916, en route from the Cathedral Shrine an effigy of the Virgin is accompanied by cadets from the Artillery Academy and the band (which comes from the Academy of Toledo). In its trip from the Sanctuary to the Cathedral, the effigy is accompanied by the Cadets to Plaza del Azoguejo, where they sing a Salve. Until a few years ago, there were exhibitions of Castilian Jotas in the Alameda de la Fuencisla with the arrival of the Virgin; but more recently Castilian Jotas are performed in the Azoguejo.

==== Holy Week ====
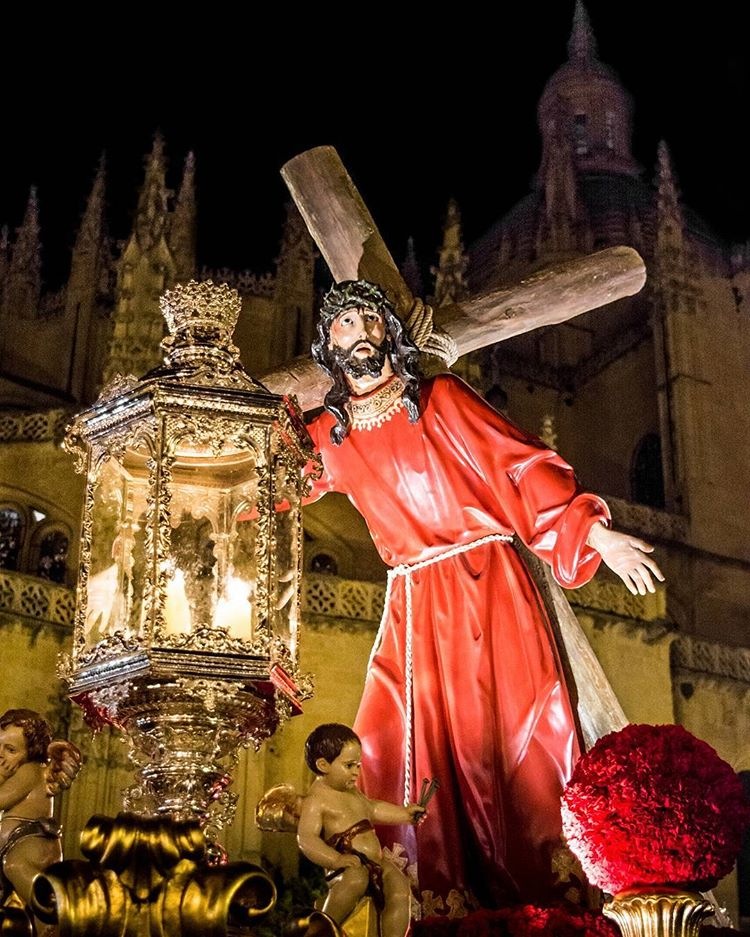
Paso during the Holy Week in Segovia.

The Holy Week is one of the most important cultural and religious events in all of Segovia, it is officially considered as a Fiesta of National Tourist Interest. The earliests signs of a primitive Holy Week dates back to 1534, while the oldest brotherhood that currently marches through the city is the "Real Cofradía de la Santa y Venerable Esclavitud y del Santo Entierro del Cristo de los Gascones" which was founded in 1647 and accompanies the float of the Cristo de los Gascones, which is dated around the 11th century.

The most important procession of the event is the "Procesión de los Pasos", in which all of the brotherhoods of Segovia march together from the cathedral to de acueduct in a way so that the floats represent chronologically the Passion and Death of Christ. The brotherhoods that participate in the Holy Week are the following and march in the "Procesión de los Pasos" following the order in which they are mentioned:

- Oración en el Huerto (neighbourhood of San Lorenzo)
- Resurrección del Señor (neighbourhood of Nueva Segovia)
- Cristo con la cruz a Cuestas (ADEMAR association)
- Santo Cristo de la Cruz (neighbourhood of Cristo del Mercado)
- Santo Cristo de San Marcos (neighbourhood of San Marcos)
- Soledad al pie de la Cruz (neighbourhood of San Millán)
- Nuestra Señora de la Piedad (neighbourhood of San José)
- Real Cofradía de la Santa Esclavitud (neighbourhood of El Salvador)
- Feligresía de San Andrés (neighbourhood of San Andrés)
- Soledad Dolorosa (neighbourhood of Santa Eulalia)

=== Legends ===
There are many due to the longevity of the city, among the main ones are:

- Legend of the construction of the aqueduct by the devil;
- Legend of the rooks and the Church of Vera Cruz;
- Legend of María del Salto, a Jew saved by the Virgin when she was going to fall off the cliff in La Fuencisla;
- Legend of the good bandit of the 19th century El Tuerto de Pirón;
- Legend of the street of Death and Life during the Comunera Revolution;
- Legend of the La Mujer Muerta mountain;
- Legend of the House of Crime, in the San Millán neighborhood;
- Legend of the Academy of Artillery about the ghost of a young medieval friar;
- Legend of the prince and the aya (caretaker) about the fall of the infant Pedro, 12-year-old son of Enrique II through a window of the alcázar.
- Legend of Alfonso X El Sabio about God's punishment of his heresies.

There are also other different legends in the incorporated neighborhoods.

== Notable people ==
- Jerónimo de Alcalá (physician and author)
- Víctor Barrio (bullfighter)
- Juan Bravo (rebel)
- Isabel de Ceballos-Escalera (museum director and curator)
- Pedro Delgado (cyclist)
- Juan Valdivia (guitarist of Héroes del Silencio)
- Andrés Laguna (humanist physician, pharmacologist and botanist)
- Arsenio Martínez-Campos (military officer)
- Manuel Pérez Brunicardi (ski mountaineer)
- Cayetano Redondo Aceña (politician, typographer and journalist)
- Elvira Sastre (poet)
- Don Abraham Senior Coronel
- Antonio Machado (poet)
- Aniceto Marinas (sculptor)

== Twin towns – sister cities ==
Segovia is twinned with:

- Gangdong-gu, Seoul, South Korea (2001)
- Navalcarnero, Community of Madrid, Spain (1999)
- San Bartolomé de Tirajana, Gran Canaria, Spain (1996)
- Tours, Centre-Val de Loire, France (1972)
- Pleven, Pleven Province, Bulgaria
- Lal-lo, Cagayan, Philippines

== Antipode ==
Segovia is the Antipode of Masterton, New Zealand.

== See also ==
- Infante Jaime, Duke of Segovia (1908–1975), Legitimist claimant to the French throne
- Church of San Andres (Cuellar)

== Footnotes and references ==
Footnotes
