= Casa de la Moneda =

Casa de la Moneda or Casa de Moneda is Spanish for mint (coin) (literally, house of money) and is the name of many buildings and institutions:

- Casa de Moneda de la República Argentina, mint and museum
- Casa de la Moneda de Bolivia
- Casa de Moneda de Colombia, former mint, now a museum
- Casa de la Moneda in Mariquita, Tolima, Colombia, 150 km north-west of Bogotá
- Casa de Moneda de México
- Real Casa de la Moneda y Timbre de Manila, the Manila Mint, Philippines
- Spain
  - Fábrica Nacional de Moneda y Timbre – Real Casa de la Moneda, Royal Mint of Spain
  - Casa de Moneda de Jubia, Spain
  - The Casa de la Moneda in Segovia, Spain
- The Casa de la Moneda in Ciudad Colonial (Santo Domingo), Dominican Republic
- Casa de la Moneda in Tegucigalpa, Honduras
- Casa de la Moneda de Montevideo, Uruguay

== See also ==
- Palacio de La Moneda, Chile
- List of mints
