= Aqueduct of Segovia =

Roman aqueduct in Segovia, Spain

- Acueducto de Segovia (Spanish)
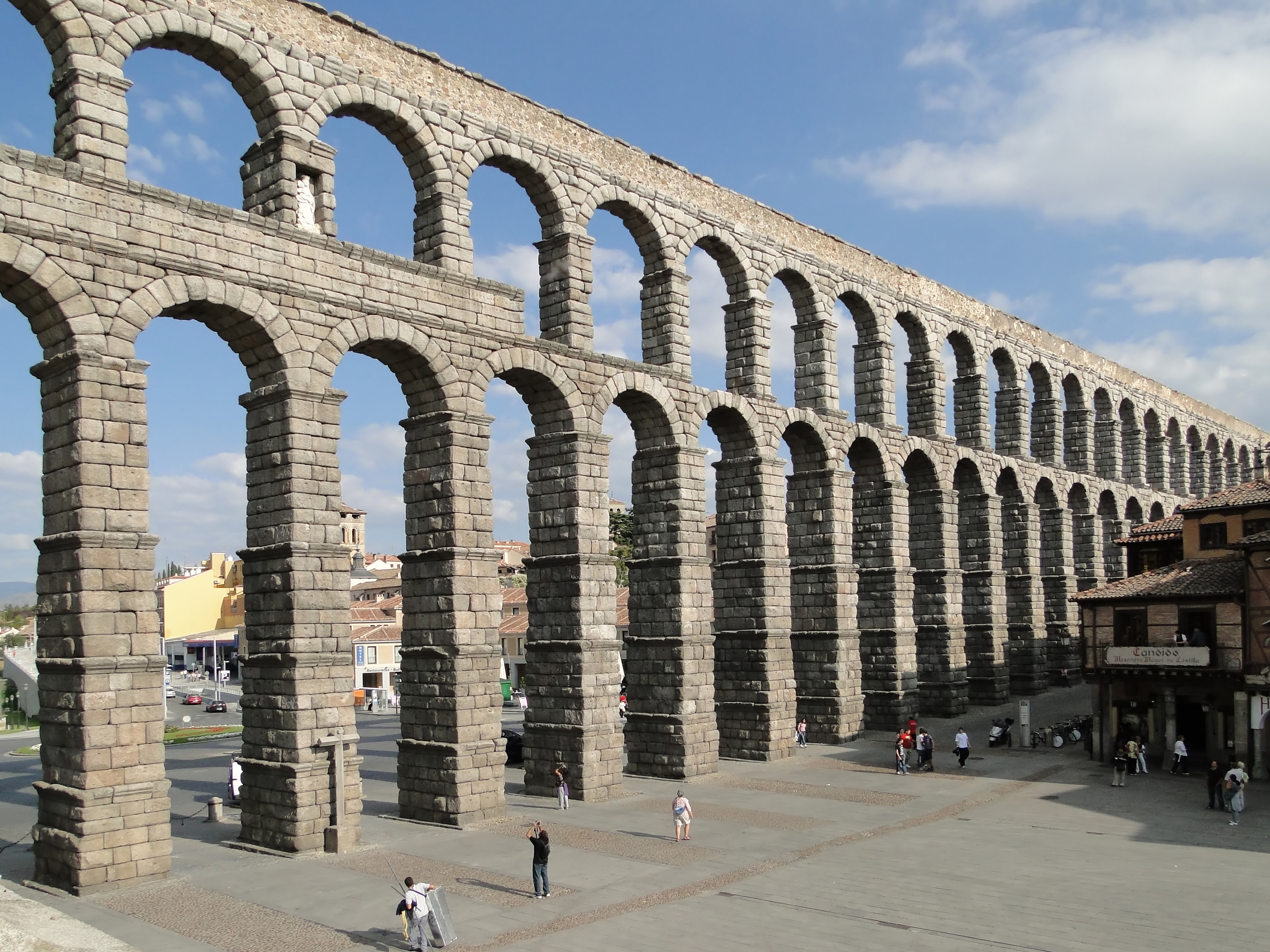
- Interactive map of Aqueduct of Segovia
- 40.9479°N 4.1178°W
- Type: Roman aqueduct
- Location: Segovia, Spain

Site notes
- Material: Granite

UNESCO World Heritage Site
- Official name: Aqueduct of Segovia
- Type: Cultural
- Criteria: i, iii, iv
- Designated: 1985 (9th session)
- Part of: Old Town of Segovia and its Aqueduct
- Reference no.: 311
- Region: Europe and North America

Spanish Cultural Heritage
- Official name: Aqueduct
- Type: Non-movable
- Criteria: Monument
- Designated: 11 October 1884
- Reference no.: RI-51-0000043

The Aqueduct of Segovia (Spanish: Acueducto de Segovia) is a Roman aqueduct in Spain, built around the first century AD to channel water from springs in the mountains 17 kilometres (11 mi) to Segovia's fountains, public baths and private houses, in use until 1973. Its elevated section, with its complete arcade of 167 arches, is one of the best-preserved Roman aqueduct bridges and the foremost symbol of Segovia, as evidenced by its presence on the city's coat of arms. The Old Town of Segovia and the aqueduct were declared a UNESCO World Heritage Site in 1985.

== History ==
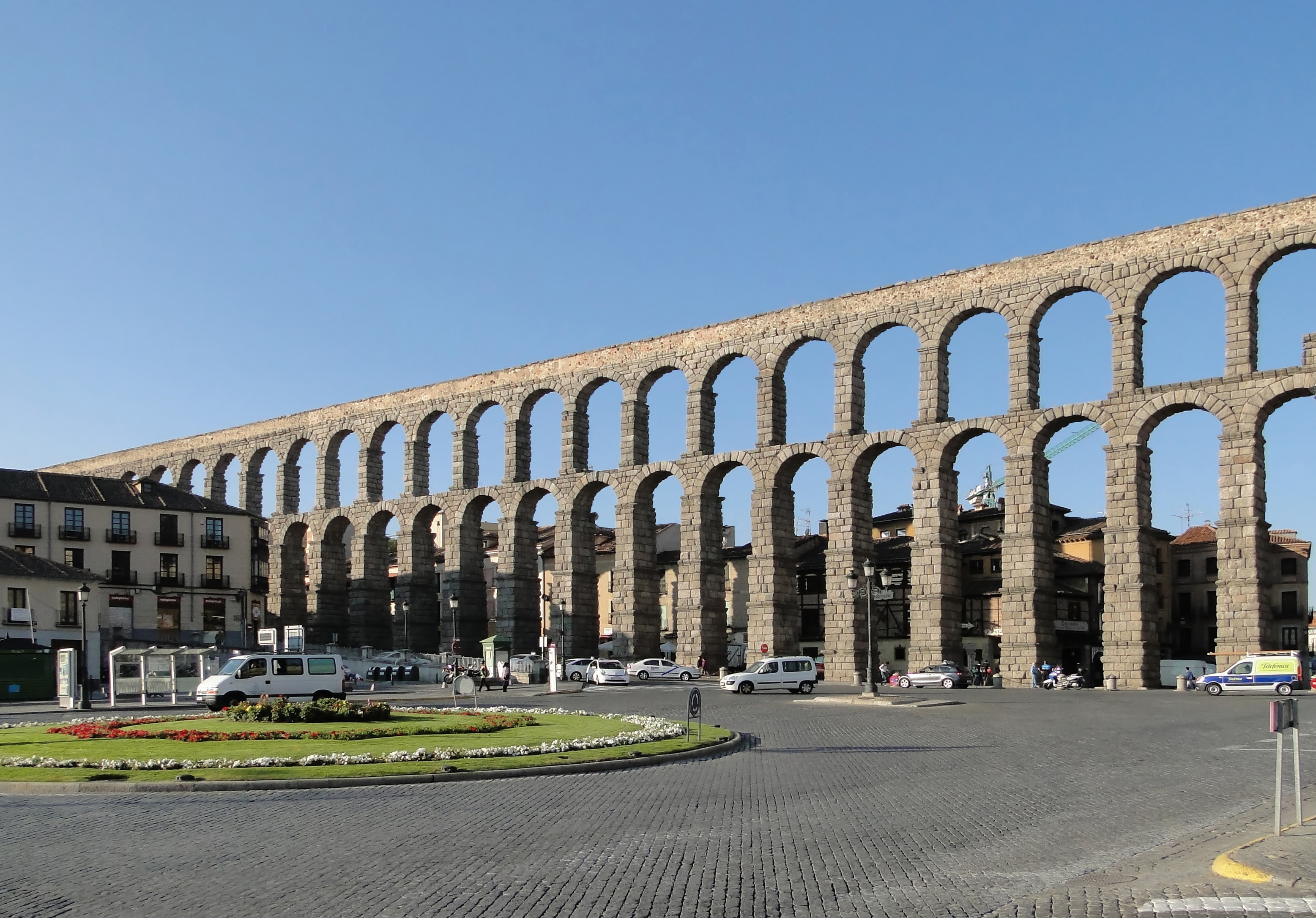
Aqueduct bridge over plaza del Azoguejo

As the aqueduct lacks a legible inscription (one was apparently located in the structure's attic, or top portion), the date of construction could not be definitively determined. The general date of the aqueduct's construction was long a mystery, although it was thought to have been during the 1st century AD, during the reigns of the Emperors Domitian, Nerva, and Trajan. At the end of the 20th century Géza Alföldy deciphered the text on the dedication plaque by studying the anchors that held the now-missing bronze letters in place. He determined that Emperor Domitian (81–96 AD) ordered its construction and proposed 98 AD as the most likely year of completion. However, in 2016 archeological evidence was published which points to a slightly later date, after 112 AD, during the government of Trajan or in the beginning of the government of emperor Hadrian, from 117 AD.

The beginnings of Segovia are also not definitively known. The Arevaci people are known to have populated the area before it was conquered by the Romans. Roman troops sent to control the area stayed behind to settle there. The area fell within the jurisdiction of the Roman provincial court (Latin conventus iuridici, Spanish convento jurídico) located in Clunia.

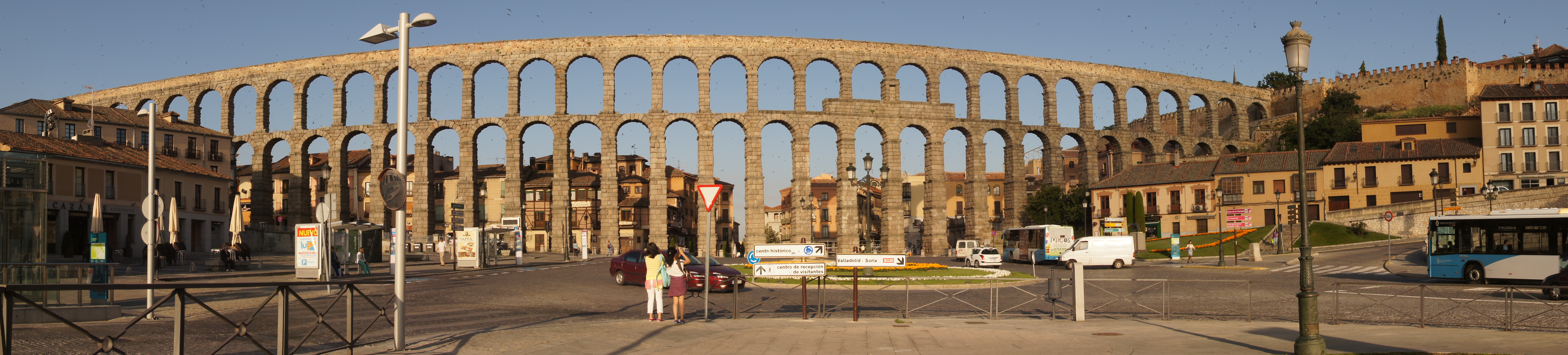
Panoramic view of Aqueduct of Segovia in 2014

== Description ==
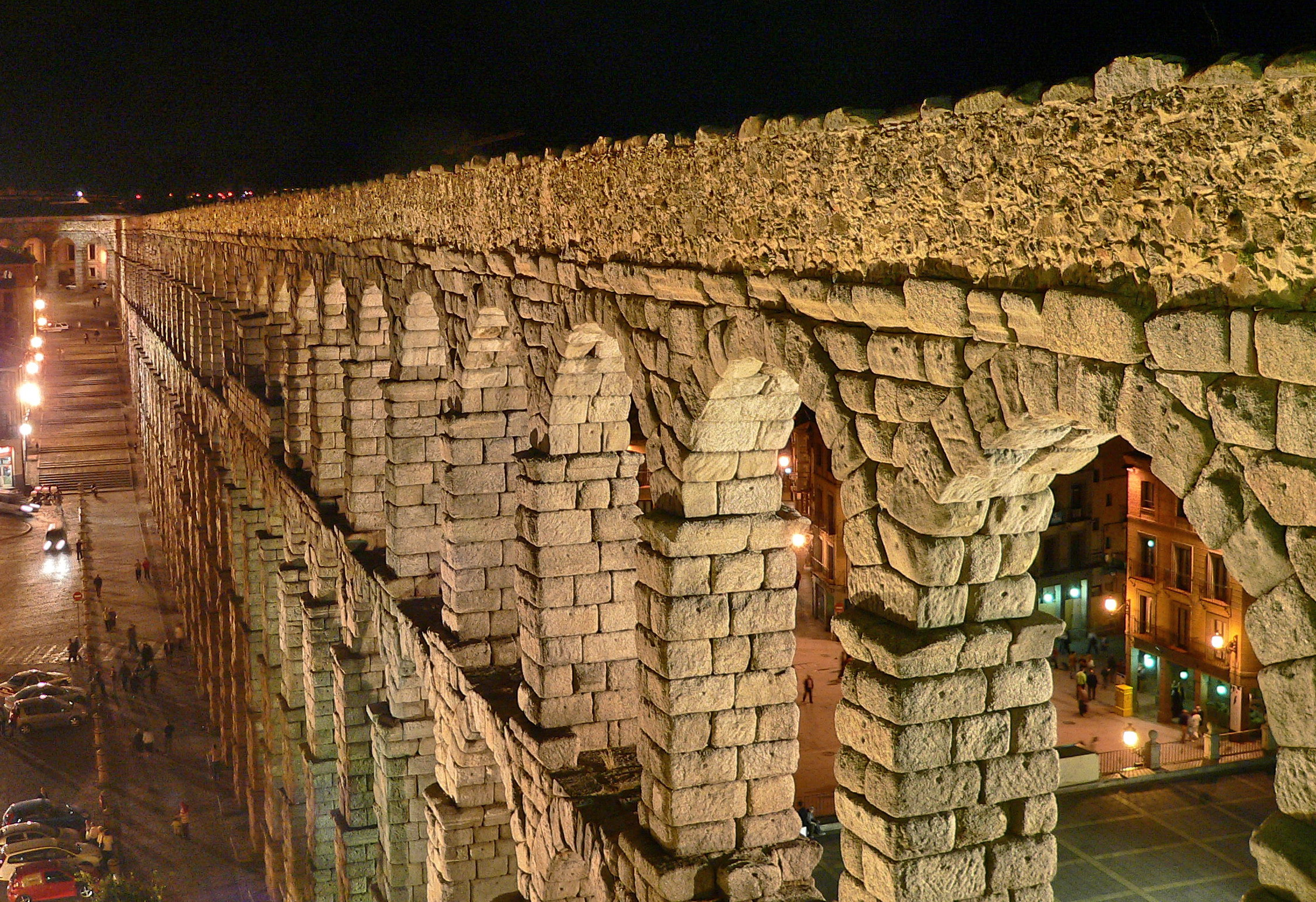
Aqueduct at night

The aqueduct once transported water from the Rio Frio, situated in the mountains 17 km (11 mi) from the city in the La Acebeda region. It runs 15 km (9.3 mi) before arriving in the city.

The construction of the aqueduct follows the principles laid out by Vitruvius in his De Architectura published in the mid-first century BC.

The water was first gathered in a tank known as El Caserón (or Big House), and was then led through a channel to a second tower known as the Casa de Aguas (or Waterhouse). There it was naturally decanted for sand to settle out, and the water continued its route. Next the water traveled 728 m (796 yd) on a one-percent grade until it was high upon the Postigo, a rocky outcropping on which sits the walled city center with its Alcázar or castle.

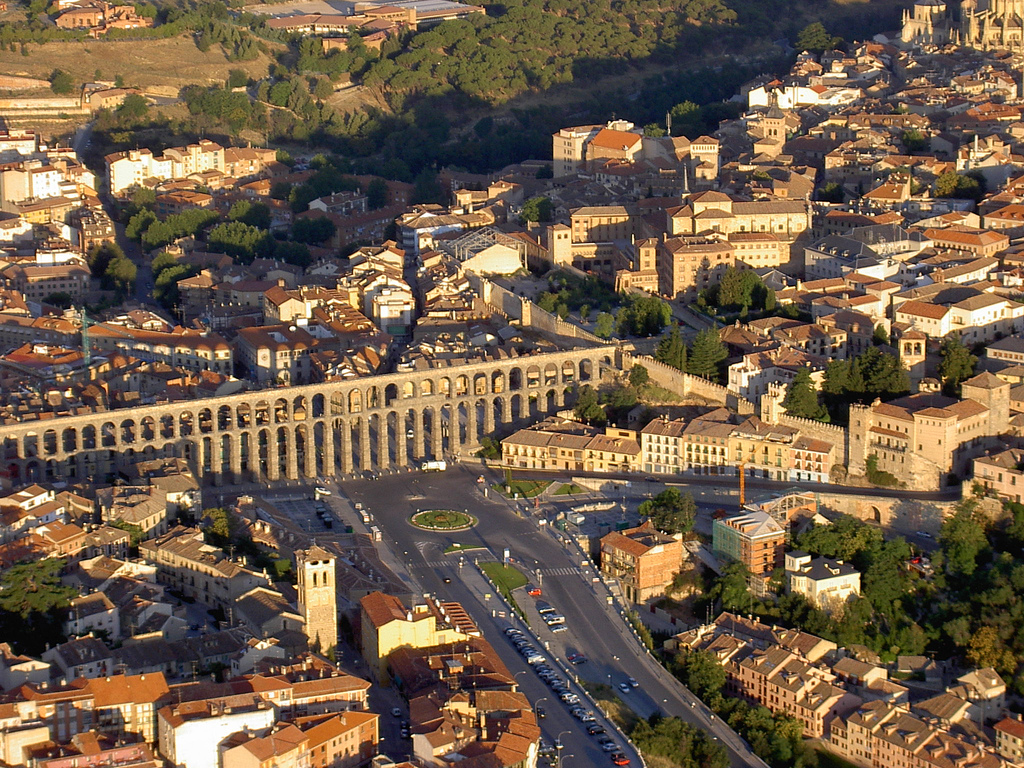
Aerial view of the aqueduct

To reach the old city, the water was conveyed by its aqueduct bridge. At Plaza de Díaz Sanz the structure makes an abrupt turn and heads toward Plaza Azoguejo. It is there the monument begins to display its full splendor. At its tallest, the aqueduct reaches a height of 28.5 m (93 ft 6 in), including nearly 6 m (19 ft 8 in) of foundation. There are both single and double arches supported by pillars. From the point the aqueduct enters the city until it reaches Plaza de Díaz Sanz, it includes 75 single arches and 44 double arches (or 88 arches when counted individually), followed by four single arches, totalling 167 arches in all.

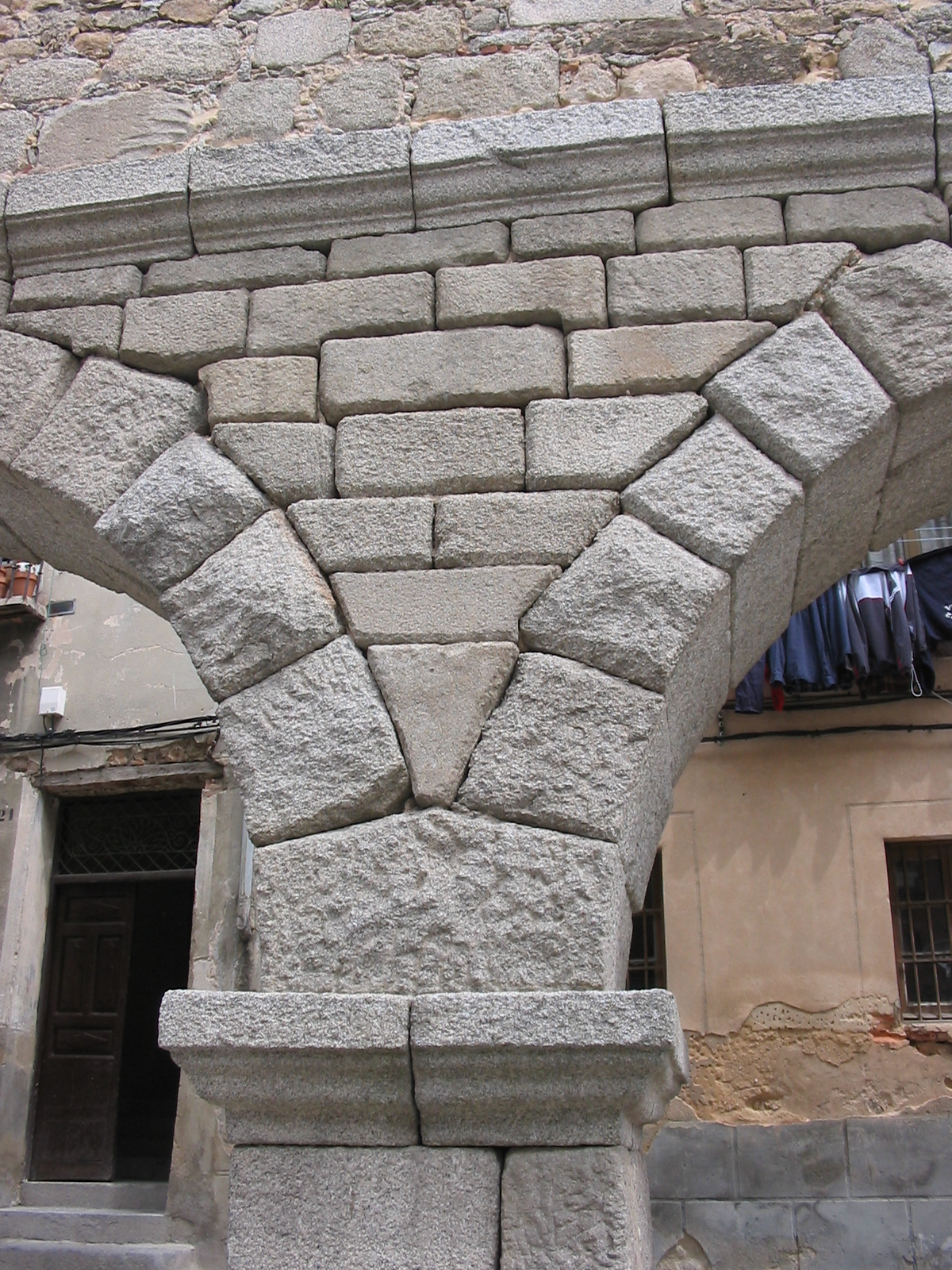
Restored portion of the aqueduct

The first section of the aqueduct contains 36 semi-circular arches, rebuilt in the 15th century to restore a portion destroyed by the Moors in 1072. The line of arches is organized in two levels, decorated simply, in which simple moulds hold the frame and provide support to the structure. On the upper level, the arches are 5.1 metres (16.1 ft) wide. Built in two levels, the top pillars are both shorter and narrower than those on the lower level. The top of the structure contains the channel through which water travels, through a U-shaped hollow measuring 0.55 tall by 0.46 metre diameter. The top of each pillar has a cross-section measuring 1.8 by 2.5 metres (5.9 by 8.2 feet), while the base cross-section measures 2.4 by 3 metres (7.9 by 9.8 feet).

The aqueduct is built of unmortared, brick-like granite blocks. During the Roman era, each of the three tallest arches displayed a sign in bronze letters, indicating the name of its builder along with the date of construction. Today, two niches are still visible, one on each side of the aqueduct. One of them is known to have held the image of Hercules, who, according to legend, was founder of the city. That niche now contains an image of the Virgin. The other one used to hold an image of Saint Stephen, now lost.

=== Distribution of the water ===
Within the walled city there was a distribution system via a deposit called a castellum aquae. While the details of this system are not fully known, it has been established that the water followed a subterranean route. The main channel has been marked on the city's pavements.

== Subsequent ==
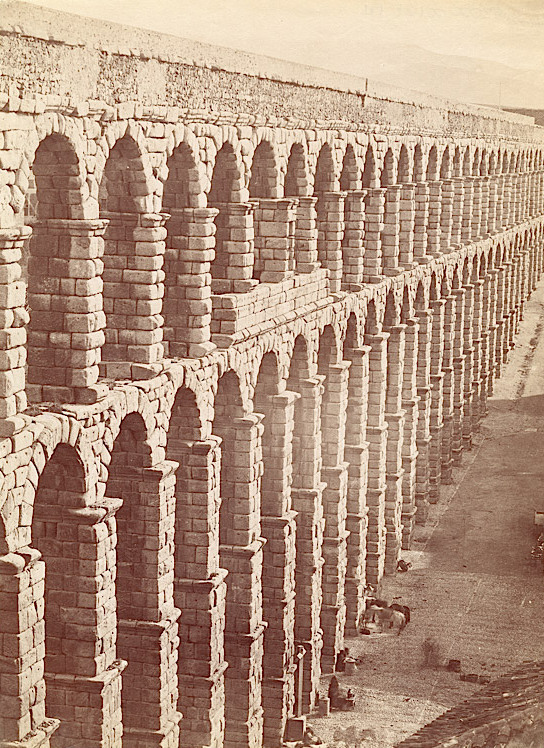
Segovia Aqueduct by Juan Laurent, c. 1856–1867, Department of Image Collections, National Gallery of Art Library, Washington, DC

The first reconstruction of the aqueduct took place during the reign of King Ferdinand and Queen Isabella, known as Los Reyes Católicos or the Catholic Monarchs. Don Pedro Mesa, the prior of the nearby Jerónimos del Parral monastery, led the project. A total of 36 arches were rebuilt, with great care taken not to change any of the original work or style. Later, in the 16th century, the central niches and aforementioned statues were placed on the structure. On 4 December, the day of Saint Barbara, who is the patron saint of artillery, the cadets of the local military academy drape the image of the Virgen de la Fuencisla in a flag.

The aqueduct is the city's most important architectural landmark. It had been kept functioning throughout the centuries and preserved in excellent condition. It provided water to Segovia until 1973. Because of differential decay of stone blocks, water leakage from the upper viaduct, and pollution that caused the granite ashlar masonry to deteriorate and crack, the site was listed in the 2006 World Monuments Watch by the World Monuments Fund (WMF). WMF Spain brought together the Ministry of Culture, the regional government of Castilla y León, and other local institutions to collaborate in implementing the project.

== Interpretation ==
One of the buildings of Segovia's former mint, the Real Casa de Moneda, houses an aqueduct interpretation centre, developed with funding from European Economic Area grants.

There is a connection between the mint and the aqueduct in that coins minted in Segovia used the aqueduct as a mint mark. Another link is that the building provided for the mint in the 16th century harnessed water power to drive its machinery, although the water is taken directly from the River Eresma rather than sourced from the aqueduct.

== See also ==
- List of aqueducts in the Roman Empire
- List of aqueducts in the city of Rome by date
- Ancient Roman technology
- Roman engineering
