= Museo Casa de la Moneda (Madrid) =

Museum of the Royal Mint
- Museo Casa de la Moneda
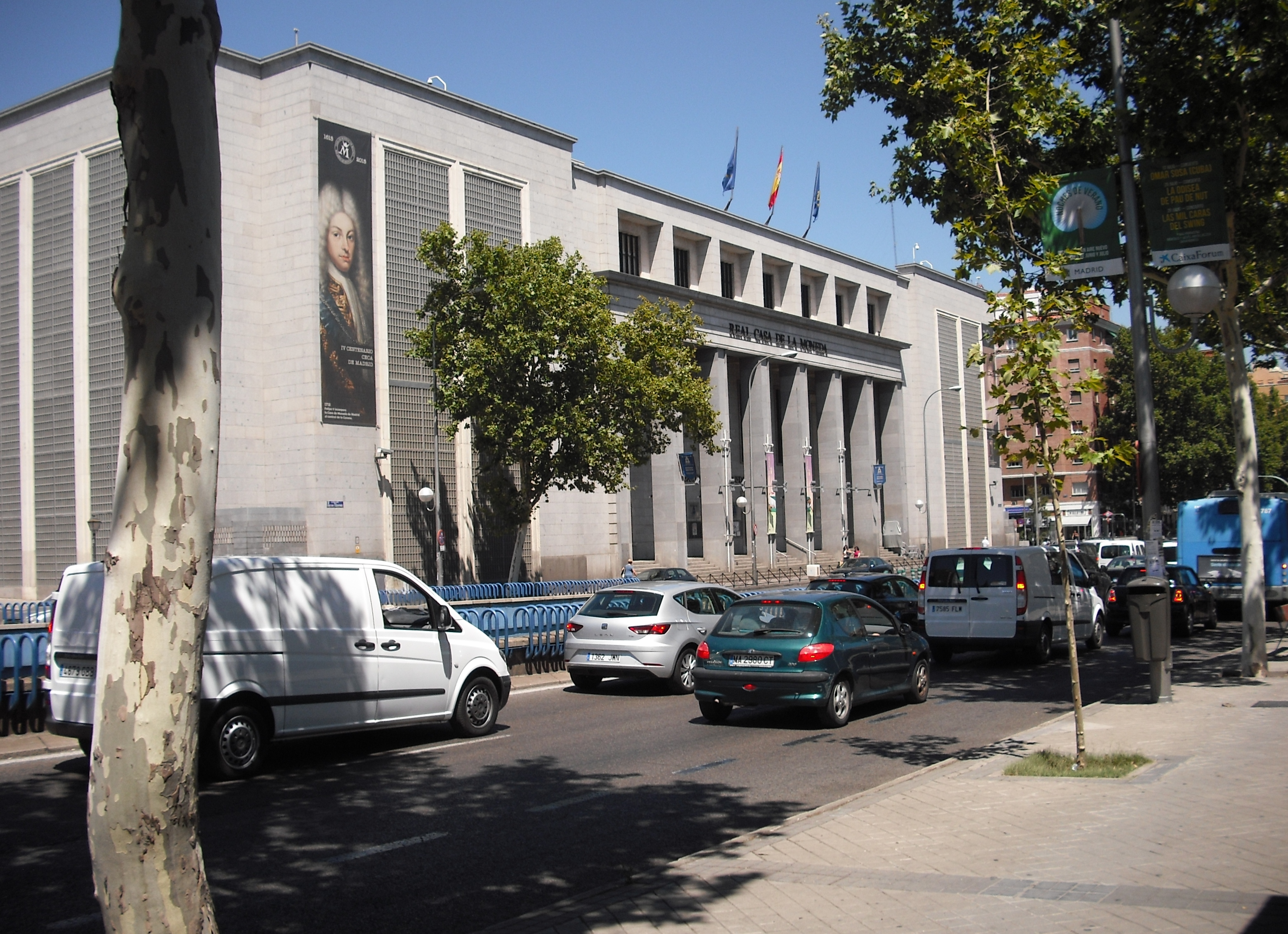
- Established: 1867; 159 years ago
- Location: Calle del Doctor Esquerdo 36; Madrid, Spain
- Coordinates: 40.422861°N 3.669044°W
- Type: Numismatic; Philately
- Collections: Coins, banknotes, medals, lottery tickets, postage stamps
- Public transit access: O'Donnell
- Website: Official website

The Museum of the Royal Mint (Museo Casa de la Moneda) is a permanent exhibition in the Spanish Royal Mint in Madrid, Spain. It contains the largest numismatic collection in Spain and one of the most complete in Europe.

== History ==
In 1867, during the reign of Isabel II, the original collection of the Royal Mint was first displayed to the public in its old headquarters in Plaza de Colón. It remained there until 1964, when the Royal Mint moved to its current location at Calle del Doctor Esquerdo.

== Exhibits ==
The numismatic collection starts from its origins, passing through Greece, Rome, Hispania, the Middle Ages, the Catholic Monarchs, the House of Austria and the House of Bourbon. It also has two rooms with coins from the 19th century to the 21st century. It is the largest numismatic collection in Spain and one of the most complete in Europe.

The museum also has rooms dedicated to paper money, philately, stamped paper, lottery tickets, medals, graphic arts, as well as temporary exhibitions and some examples of coinage and banknote authenticity verification machinery.

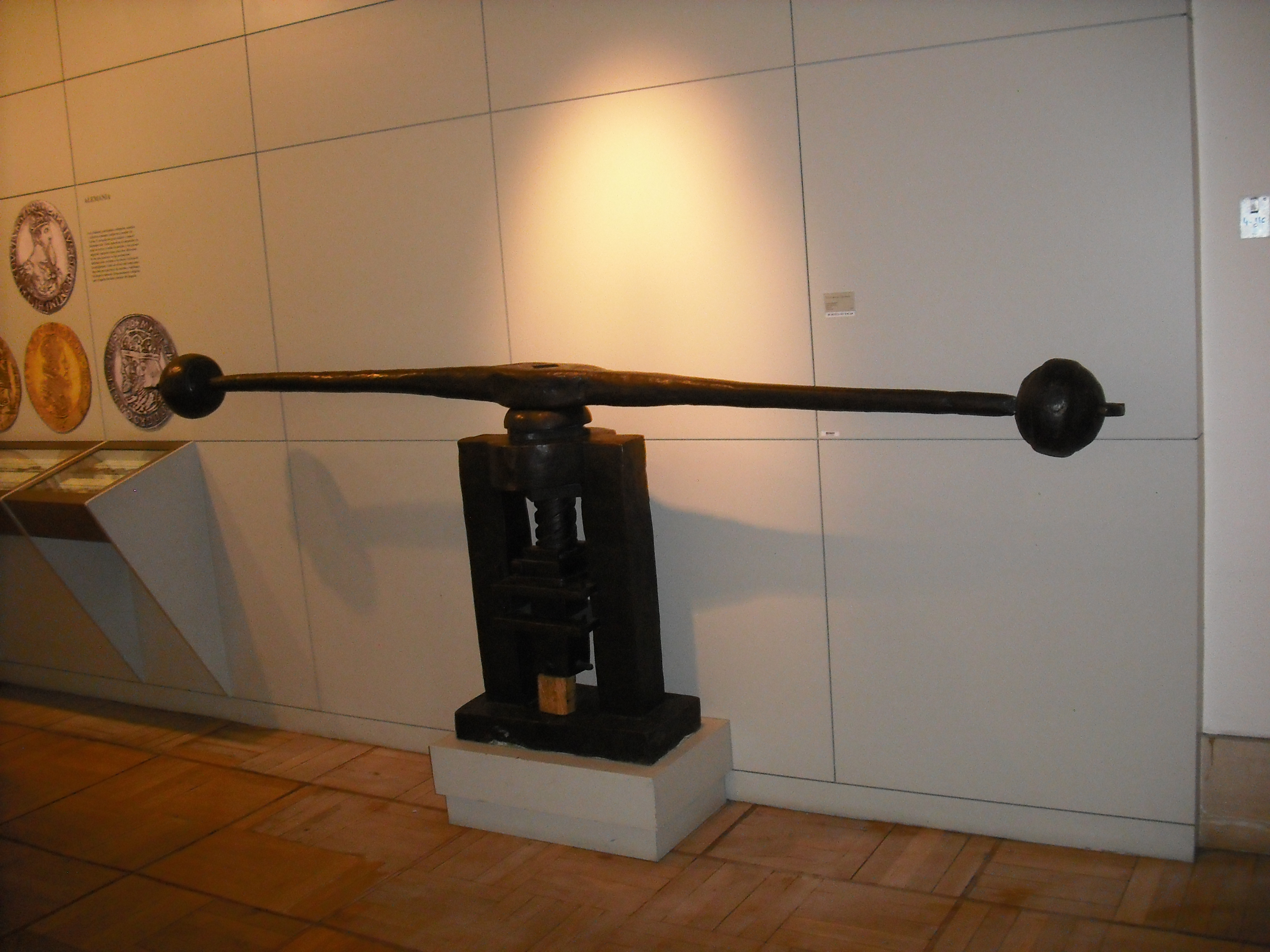
Flywheel coin minting press: copy of an original from Pamplona at the Museum of Navara, 16th-century

== See also ==
- List of museums in Madrid
- National Mint of Xuvia
