= Royal Mint (Spain) =

Spanish public business entity

Coordinates: 40.4227°N 3.6709°W

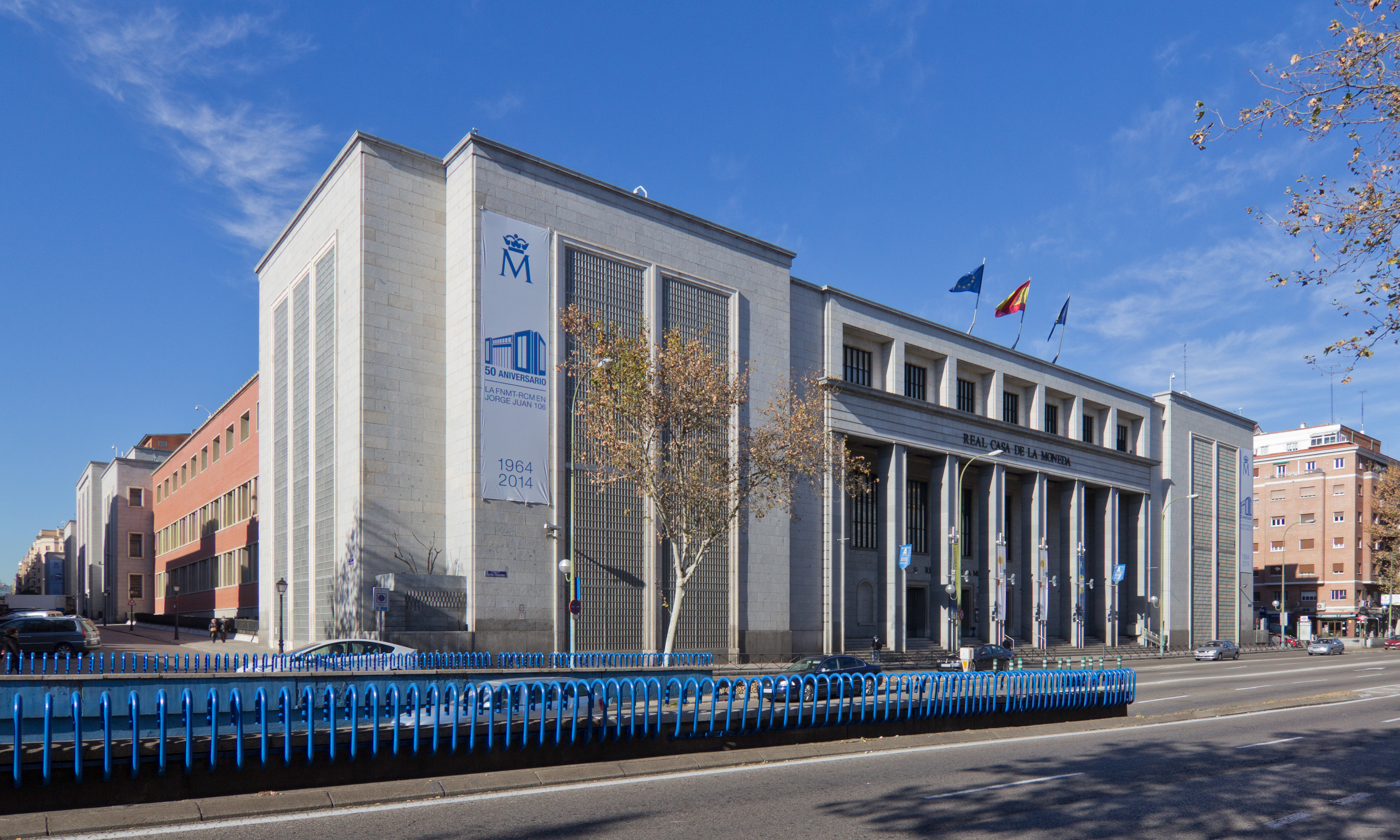
- Headquarters at Calle del Doctor Esquerdo Nº 36, Madrid
- Company type: Statutory corporation
- Industry: Mint
- Predecessor: Casa de la Moneda; Fábrica del Sello
- Founded: August 1893
- Area served: Spain
- Owner: Government of Spain
- Parent: Ministry of Economy
- Website: www.fnmt.es/

The Royal Mint of Spain (Spanish: Fábrica Nacional de Moneda y Timbre – Real Casa de la Moneda, lit. 'National Coinage and Stamp Factory – Royal Mint', FNMT-RCM) is the national mint of Spain. The FNMT-RCM is a public corporation that is attached to the Ministry of Economy.

== History ==
There were several public and private mints in Spain until Philip V, the first Borbòn King of Spain, decided in the 18th century to make minting coinage a State monopoly.

During the reign of Isabella II there were seven public mints, located in Madrid, Barcelona, Seville, Pamplona, Jubia, Segovia and Manila (in the Philippines), and each one had its own cypher and signs. When the peseta became the national currency in 1869, only the Royal Mint in Madrid was in operation.

In 1893 the Mint (Casa de la Moneda) and the Stamp Factory (Fábrica del Sello), which so far had been two different establishments sharing a building in Plaza de Colón, merged to create the Fábrica Nacional de Moneda y Timbre.

Banknote production for the Bank of Spain began in 1940. A new building came into use in 1964, in which the passport and national identification card were produced. Later, bingo cards and tickets for the state-run lottery were printed.

== Royal Mint today ==
Two plants, in Madrid and Burgos, are currently operational. Burgos is the location of the paper mill where banknotes are printed. Some of the FNMT-RCM's product lines are ISO 9001 certified.

On 2 November 2015 Imprenta de Billetes, S.A. (IMBISA) was incorporated, whose corporate purpose is the production of Euro banknotes, following its official inscription in the Spanish Companies' Registry. The company, which has capital totalling €50 million, is 80%-owned by the Banco de España and 20%-owned by FNMT-RCM (the Spanish Royal Mint), which may maintain this stake until 31 December 2017. The company was created in response to the need to adapt to the legal framework for euro banknote production. This follows the approval by the European Central Bank on 13 November 2014 of a new guideline that solely permits two alternatives for producing the national quota of euro banknotes: doing so at a printing works owned by the issuing central bank, or through a competitive tender aimed at external printers. The Spanish authorities chose the first option. Law 36/2014, of 26 December 2014, on the 2015 State Budget amended the Law of Autonomy of the Banco de España so that the central bank could entrust its euro banknote production quota to a commercial law firm in which it held a majority stake.

The Mint is a root certificate authority for Internet services, included in Mozilla's root CA store.

== Museums ==
The mint has a permanent museum exhibition, on the third floor of its headquarters building, called the Museo Casa de la Moneda.

The historic mint in Segovia also houses a museum.

== In popular culture ==
The mint is the focus of the Spanish television series Money Heist (La casa de papel), although the exterior of the Mint building in the series is that of the building of the Spanish National Research Council.

== See also ==
- Casa de Moneda de Jubia
- Spanish peseta
- La casa de papel
