= José María Avrial =

Spanish painter, illustrator and scenographer (1807–1891)

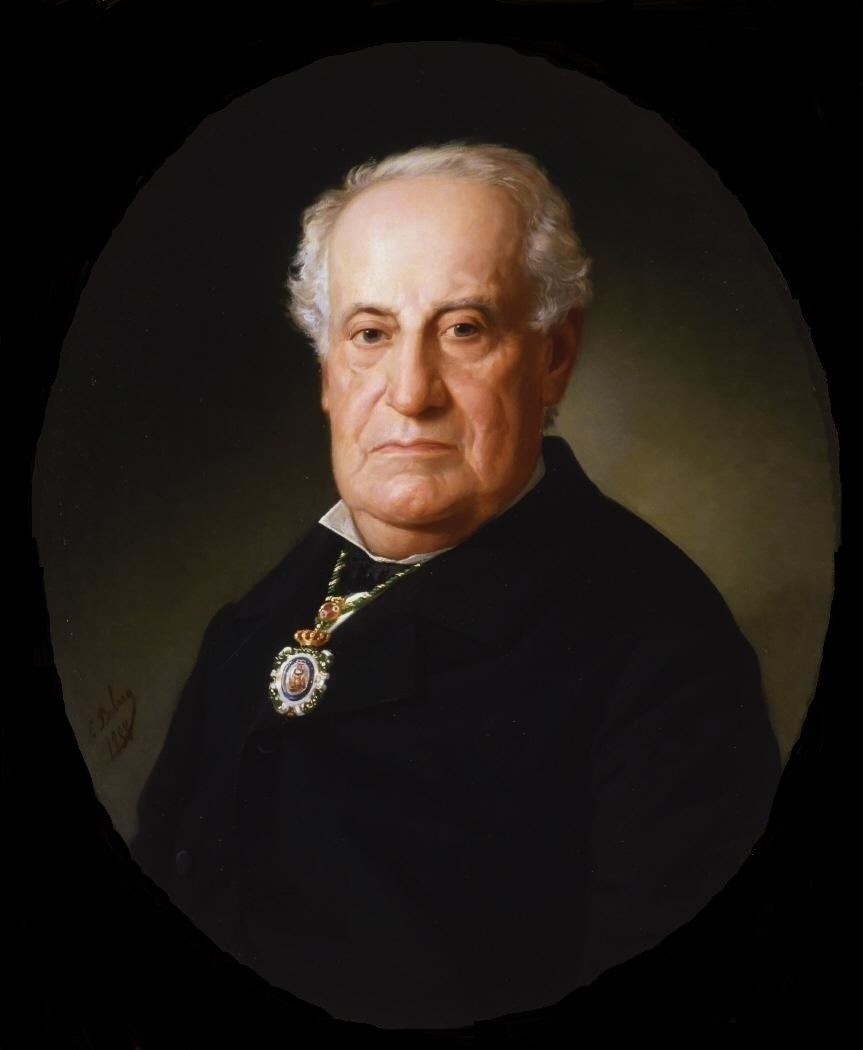
José María Avrial; portrait by Eduardo Balaca (1888)

José María Avrial y Flores (26 February 1807 – 28 December 1891) was a Spanish painter, illustrator and scenographer.

== Biography ==
Avrial was born in Madrid. At the age of twelve he was enrolled in classes at the Real Academia de Bellas Artes de San Fernando; becoming a regular student two years later. His professors were Fernando Brambila and José de Madrazo, who entrusted him with creating the lithographs for the Colección litográfica de los cuadros del rey de España.

He was named a "Person of Merit" by the academy in 1837, a distinction he also received from the Real Academia de Bellas Artes de San Carlos de Valencia the following year for his drawings of the old districts of Madrid. That same year, he was appointed Director of the School of Fine Arts in Segovia, where he established classes in decorative painting and perspective.

In 1839, he presented the San Fernando Academy with a series of drawings depicting the antiquities of Segovia, including the rooms at the Alcázar de Segovia, which would be badly damaged by a fire in 1862. He returned to Madrid in 1840 and devoted himself to painting stage scenery and designing decorations for festivals, employing his expertise with perspective. Much of his work was done at the Teatro de la Cruz where his notable sets included those for Don Juan Tenorio. He was also elected to the "Academia Arqueológica y Geográfica del Príncipe Alfonso".

He was selected to head the painting section at the Escuela de Bellas Artes de Cádiz in 1853, delivering three major speeches on art history in 1854, 1855 and 1856. These were expanded into a book at the request of the school's president. Also in 1856 he won a competition to design a monument for Domingo de Silos Moreno (1770-1853), the former Bishop of Cádiz, but the project was never completed due to lack of funds. Four years later, he was transferred, by Royal Order, to the "Escuela Superior de Pintura y Escultura" at the Court in Madrid, where Queen Isabel II named him Secretary of the "Escuela y Junta de Profesores".

In 1865, he was commissioned by the Academia del Príncipe Alfonso to write a report on the archaeological studies of Spain's national architecture, which he also illustrated. Throughout his career, he provided drawings for numerous publications, professional as well as popular. He returned to Madrid in 1873, where he became a Professor at the "Escuela Central de Artes y Oficios" of the San Fernando Academy and was also named a member there.

== Selected works ==
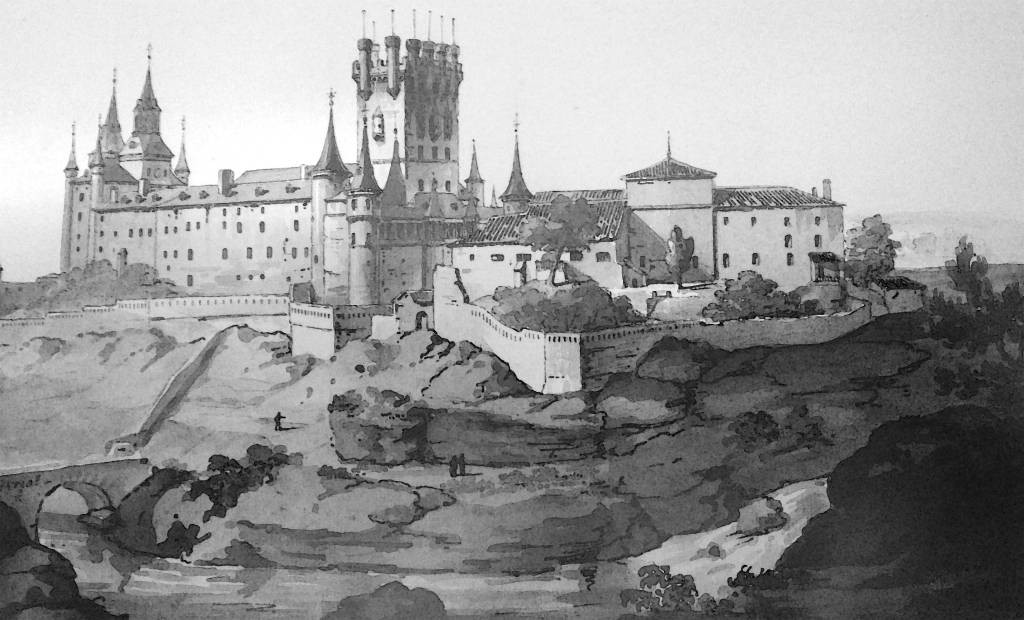
Engraving of the Alcázar de Segovia

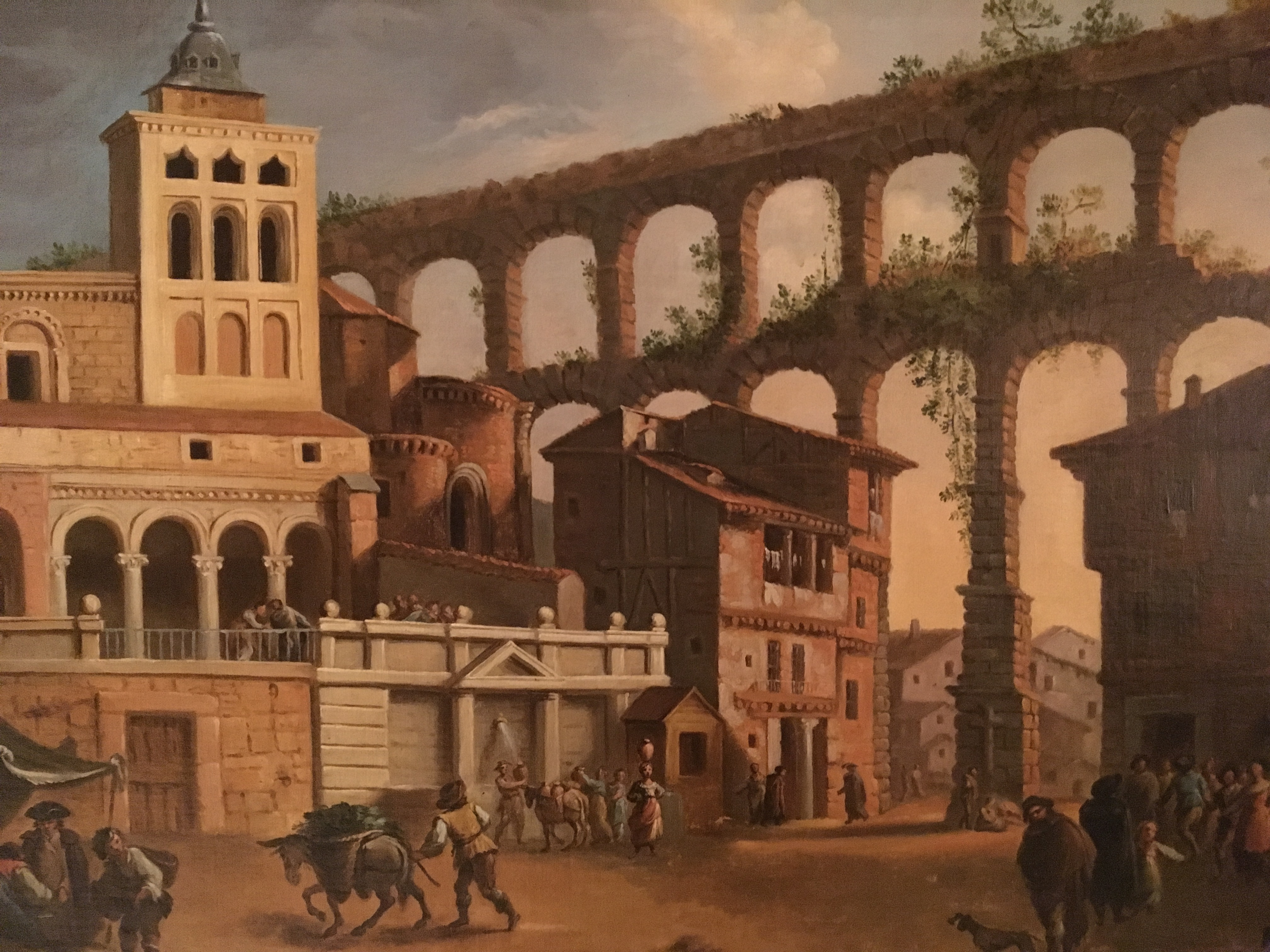
Vista de la plaza del Azoguejo y Santa Columba, 1850, Museo de Segovia

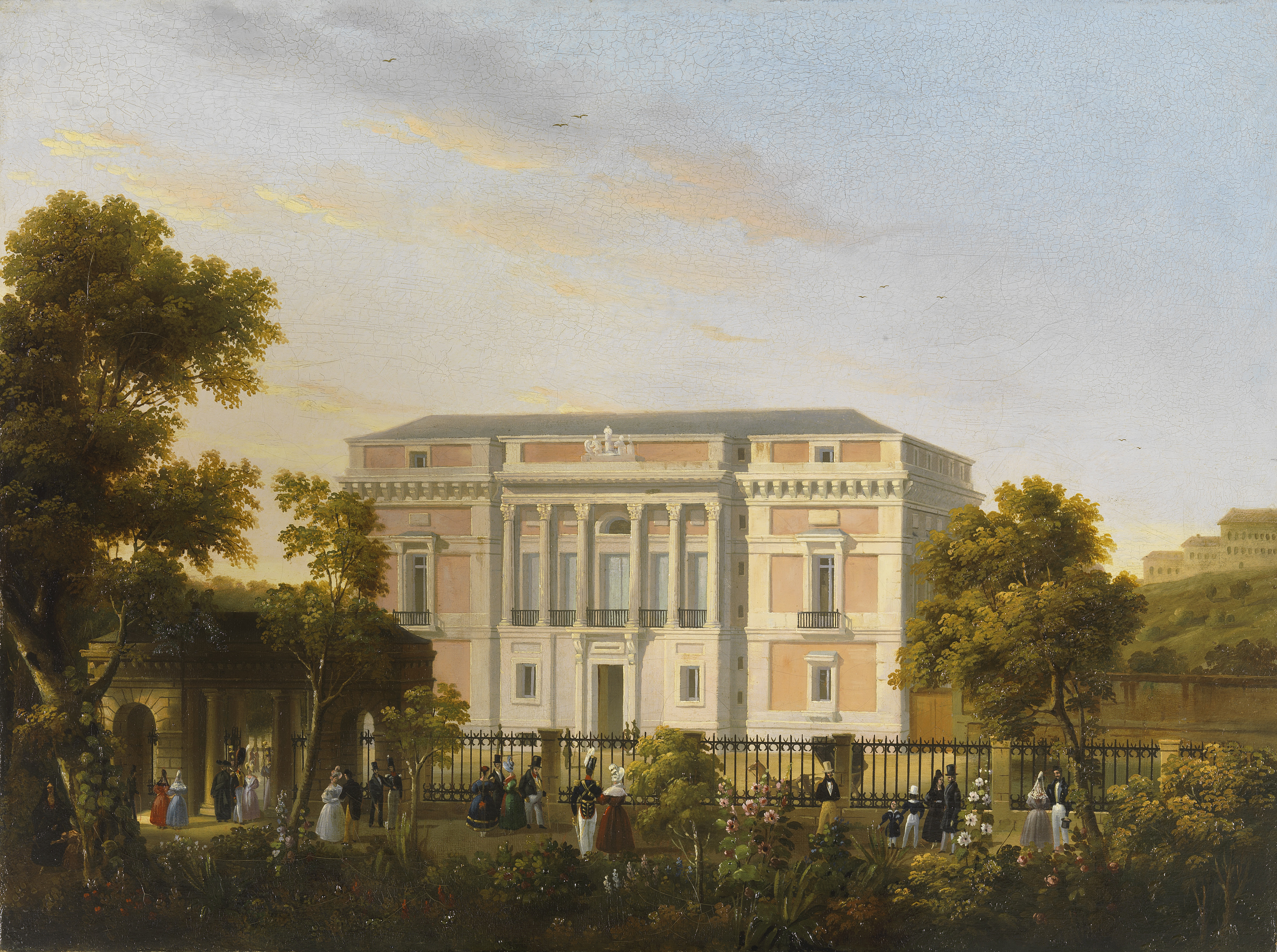
The Museo del Prado, seen from the Botanical Gardens
