= The Coining House, Segovia =

Former currency house and current museum in Segovia, Spain

Coordinates: 40°57′16″N 4°07′42″W

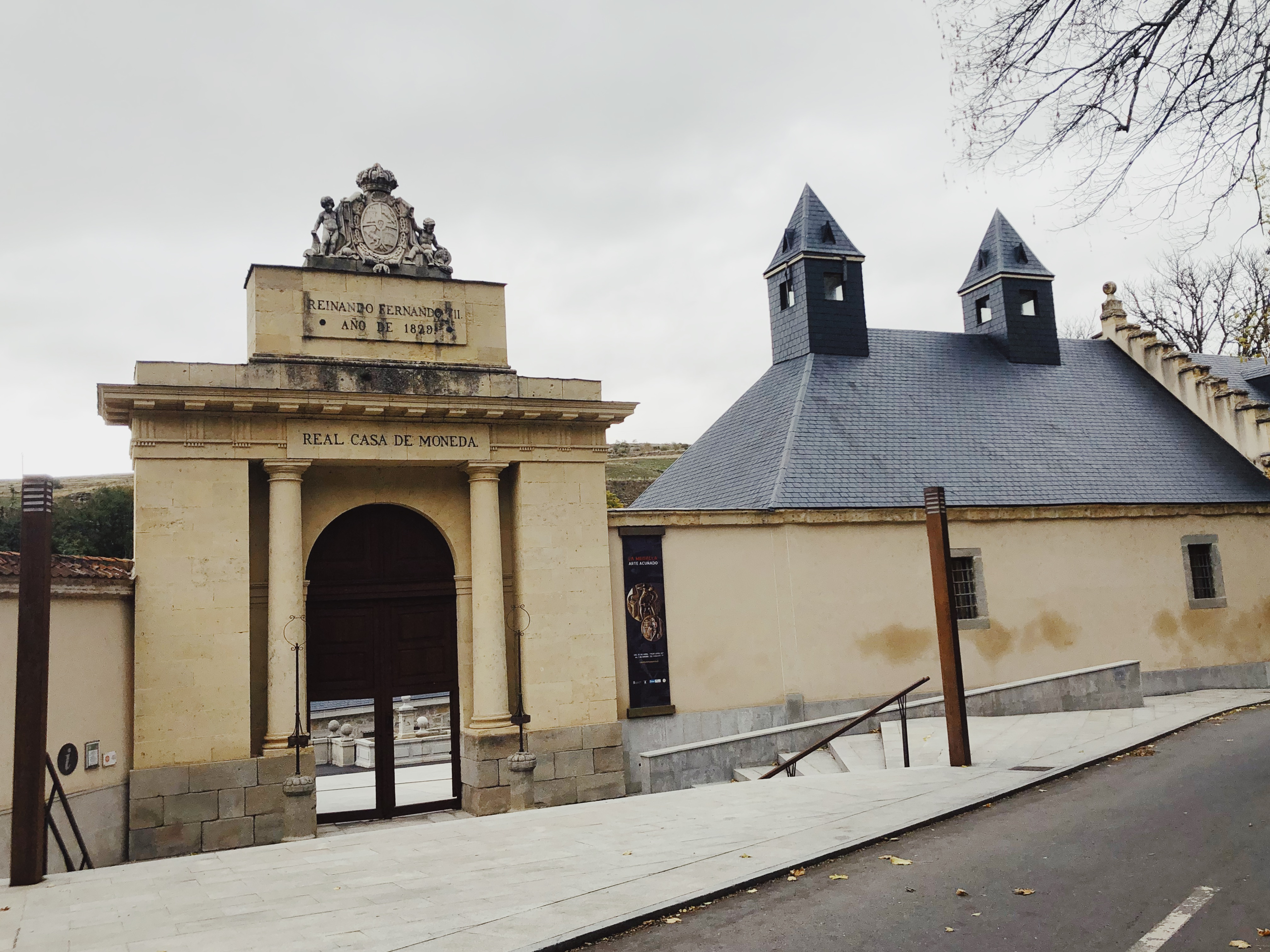
Entrance of the coining house. Although the facility was founded in the 16th century, the neoclassical entrance is from the reign of Fernando VII.

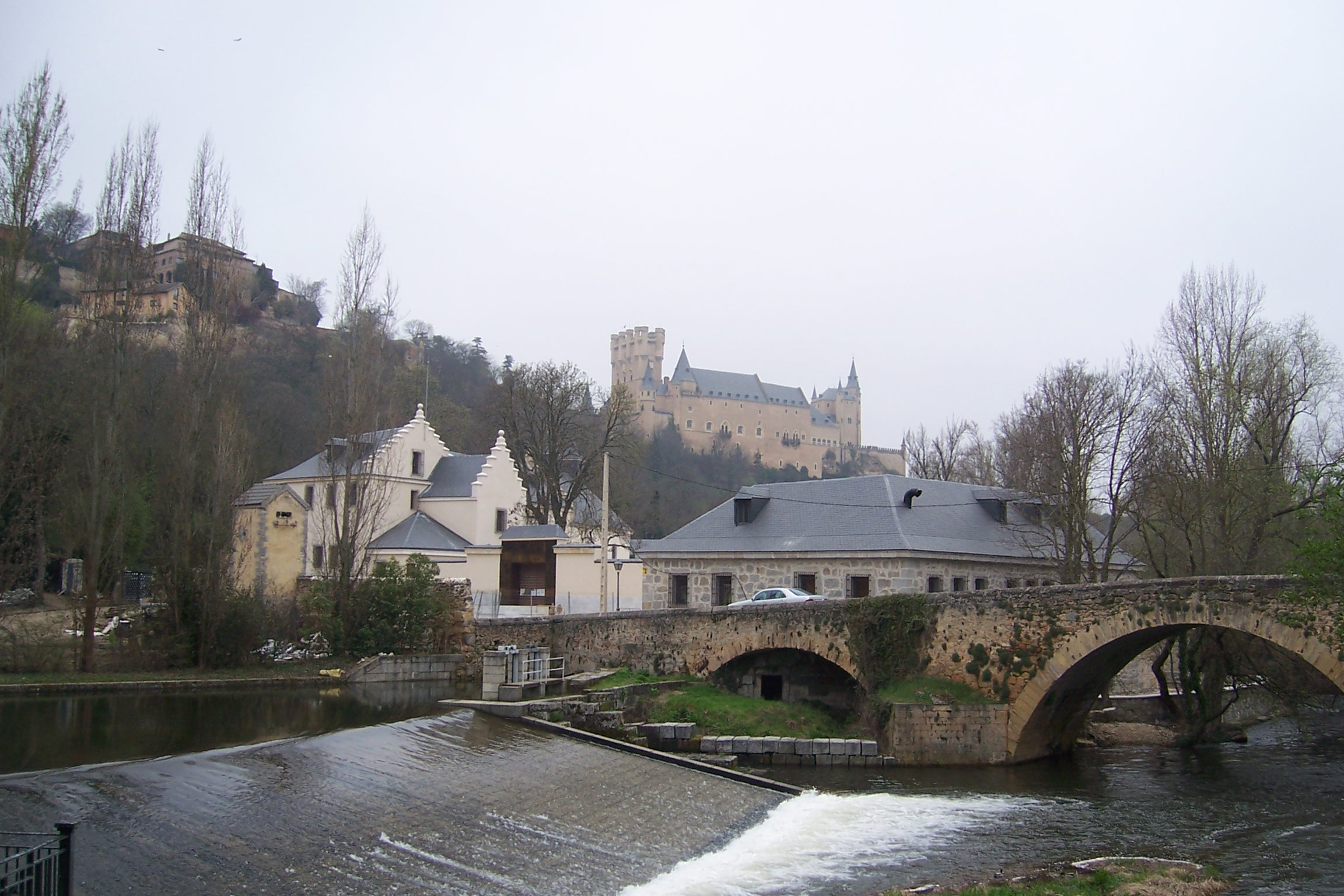
Complex of buildings of the mint with the castle on the skyline

The Coining House is a former royal mint in Segovia, Spain, which dates back to the 1500s. Today, it is a museum dedicated to coins, industrial heritage and Segovia's famous aqueduct.

== History ==
The royal mint was a coining factory that Philip II ordered to be built in the end of 1580. He was aware of the new rolling and coining system in which the involvement of the use of machinery and devices were moved by hydraulic wheels. The hydraulic wheels technique had been already operating in several cities in Europe. Archduke Ferdinand of Tyrol managed to get all the equipment necessary in order for the king to proceed. The coining house was the first mechanized factory in Spain.

In 1582, a team of experts travelled to Spain from the Austrian territory of Tyrol in search for the most fitting location in which they could construct the building that would stock the machinery. The property chosen was owned by Antonio de San Millán and was located on the banks of the Eresma River. Previously, the property was used to grind cereal and to fabricate paper. The construction of the new building began on November 7, 1583 in which they used plans drawn from Juan de Herrera, who at that time was considered the most famous Spanish architect. Together, Herrera, the king, and the experts met at the old mill to mutually decide the upcoming procedures.

The technology was updated in the 18th century with the introduction of the flywheel press.

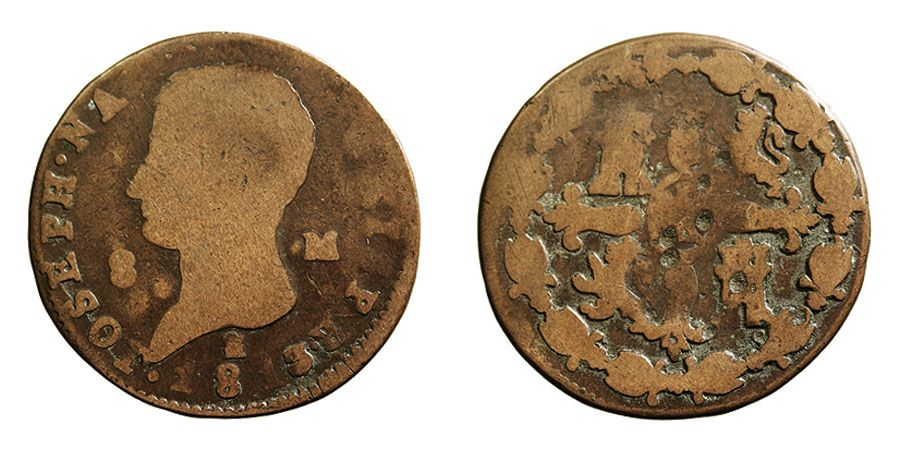
Coin of eight maravedís.

During the Napoleonic Wars the mint fell under the control of Joseph Bonaparte. With the restoration of Fernando VII coins were minted for him and his successors until the deposition of Isabel II: the last coining was in 1869.

== Architecture ==
It was built in the 16th century, commissioned by Philip II to one of the most important architects, Juan Herrera. The first draft of the construction was made by Juan Herrera and a group of tyroleans that were sent by the archduke and since then the place has stayed almost intact. It is an industrial building located between the Eresma river and The garden of Poets. The building was in a state of deterioration after its manufacturing inactivity from 1968 on. There has been a long rehabilitation process that started in 1998 with the governments protocol of collaboration to commence rehabilitation but the project was actually executed between 2007 and 2011.

== Current state ==
The building was sold and from 1878, it was transformed into a flour factory. The flour production continued until November 1967, and from then on the building was abandoned, sold, and then acquired in 1989 by the municipality. On February 14, 2007, the rehabilitation began. Today, the Royal Mill Mint is the jewel of the Spanish Mints and is considered to be the oldest industrial architecture sign still standing around the world.
