= National Mint of Xuvia =

- Interactive map of the National Mint of Xuvia area

General information
- Location: Neda, A Coruña, Spain
- Opened: 1790

The National Mint of Xuvia (Spanish: Casa de Moneda de Jubia, Galician: Real Casa da Moeda de Xuvia) was a Spanish mint of copper coins from 1812 to 1868.

The mint was established in 1790 in Xuvia (or Jubia in Spanish spelling), a civil parish in the municipality of Neda, next to Ferrol in the province of A Coruña under the name of Fábrica Nacional de Cobrería, as a copper foundry. The foundry's original purpose was to support boat constructing in the shipyard at Ferrol, but during the war against the French in the Peninsular War, the site became a standard mint producing copper coins. The Casa de Moneda de Segovia was in French control at the time, minting coins in the name of Joseph Bonaparte. Xuvia, in Spanish territory, would produce coins in name of the king, Ferdinand VII of Spain.

The first coins were minted in 1812, namely coins of eight Spanish maravedís. In later years, coins of two and four maravedís were minted in addition to one maravedí in 1824. After 1815, the Xuvia mint began to lose importance as a direct result of the Casa de Moneda de Segovia beginning to re-mint coins in the name of Fernando VII. In 1819, the mint returned to manufacturing plates for the ships in the Spanish Navy and minting was brought to a complete standstill between 1827 and 1835, with manufacturing efforts directed to production of tin plates.

The first decimal coinage of the monetary system entered into effect in 1850, having been officially agreed on in 1848. On August 28, 1850, Xuvia was instructed to finalize its manufacture of coinage. The last coins left the mint in September of that year. Notwithstanding, coins of 1, ½, 2½ and 5 céntimos were minted between 1866 and 1868. The mint was closed indefinitely in 1868, along with the mint of Segovia, and was sold at auction in 1873, later becoming a textile factory.

Over half of the mint's surrounding land consists of a dense forest of eucalyptus trees, meadows and industrial areas. Various original structures have been preserved, particularly a water wheel and a canal over 900 metres (2,953 ft) in length. The building itself is currently closed to the public.
