= Alcázar of Segovia =

Castle in Spain

- Segovia, Spain
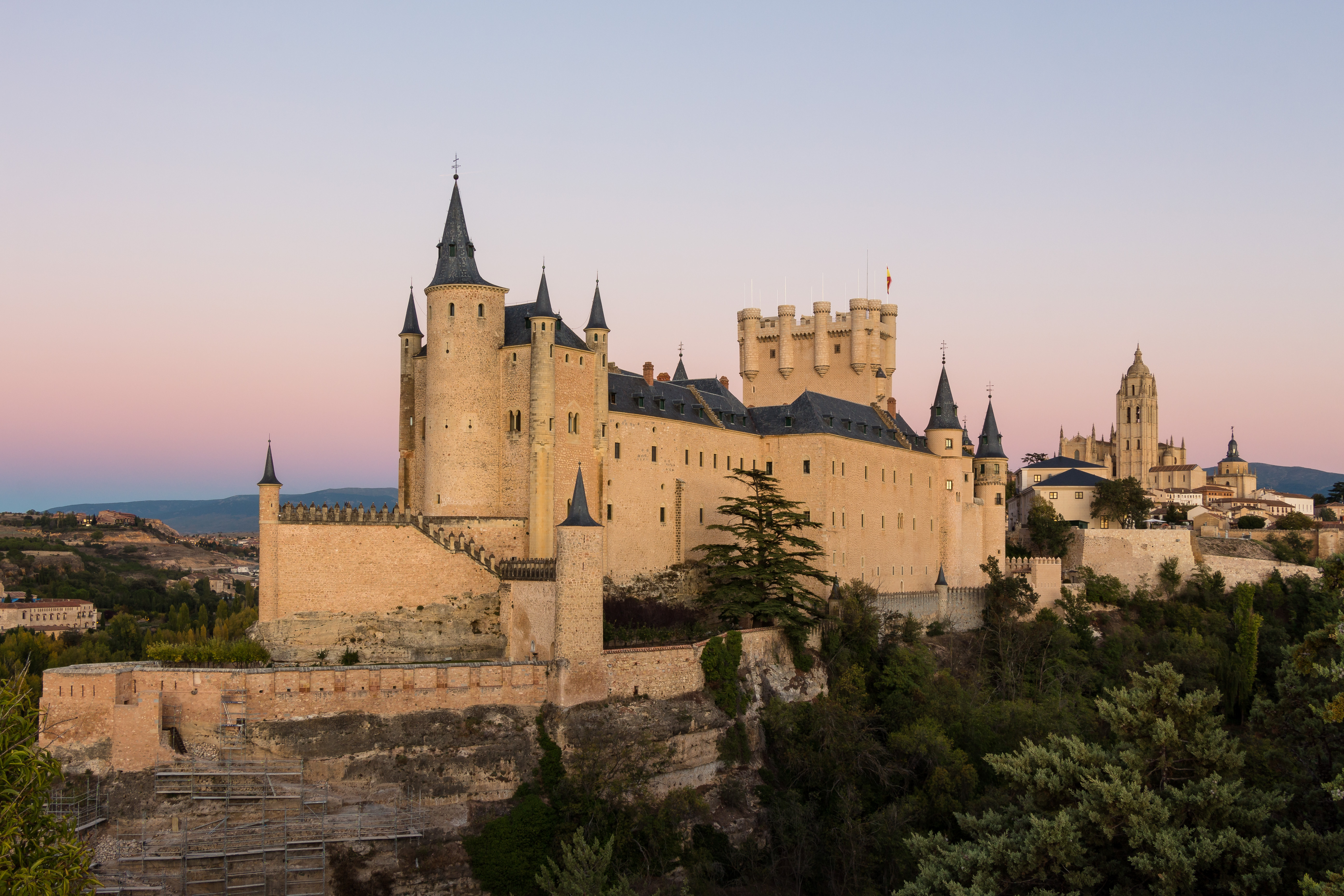

Site information
- Type: Alcázar
- Operator: Patronato del Alcázar de Segovia
- Open to the public: Yes
- Website: www.alcazardesegovia.com

Location
- Coordinates: 40°57′09″N 4°07′57″W

Garrison information
- Designations

UNESCO World Heritage Site
- Official name: Alcázar of Segovia
- Type: Cultural
- Criteria: i, iii, iv
- Designated: 1985 (9th session)
- Part of: Old Town of Segovia and its Aqueduct
- Reference no.: 311
- Region: Europe and North America

Spanish Cultural Heritage
- Official name: Alcázar
- Type: Non-movable
- Criteria: Monument
- Designated: 3 June 1931
- Reference no.: RI-51-0000861

The Alcázar of Segovia is a medieval castle located in the city of Segovia, in Castile and León, Spain. Having existed since the 12th century, it is one of the most renowned castles globally and among the most visited landmarks in Spain.

The fortress stands on a rocky crag at the western end of Segovia's Old City, which was declared a UNESCO World Heritage Site in 1985. Since its declaration as a National Archive by a Royal Decree in 1998, it has been used as a museum and a military archive. It has also been used as a state prison, a Royal Artillery College, and a military academy.

The Alcázar served both as a royal palace and fortress for the Castilian monarchs. Its history begins in the 12th or early 13th century when the royal family of Castile had quarters in the Alcázar, known as the "major palace". In the Homage tower, the treasure of the Crown of Castile was stored, from which funds were secured to finance Christopher Columbus's first voyage. In 1437, the books of the royal administration were moved to the Alcázar, establishing one of the first royal archives of Castile and laying one of the foundations for the current General Archive of Simancas. Additionally, the Alcázar housed the royal armory, which served as the basis for the one now exhibited in the Royal Armoury of Madrid.

== History ==
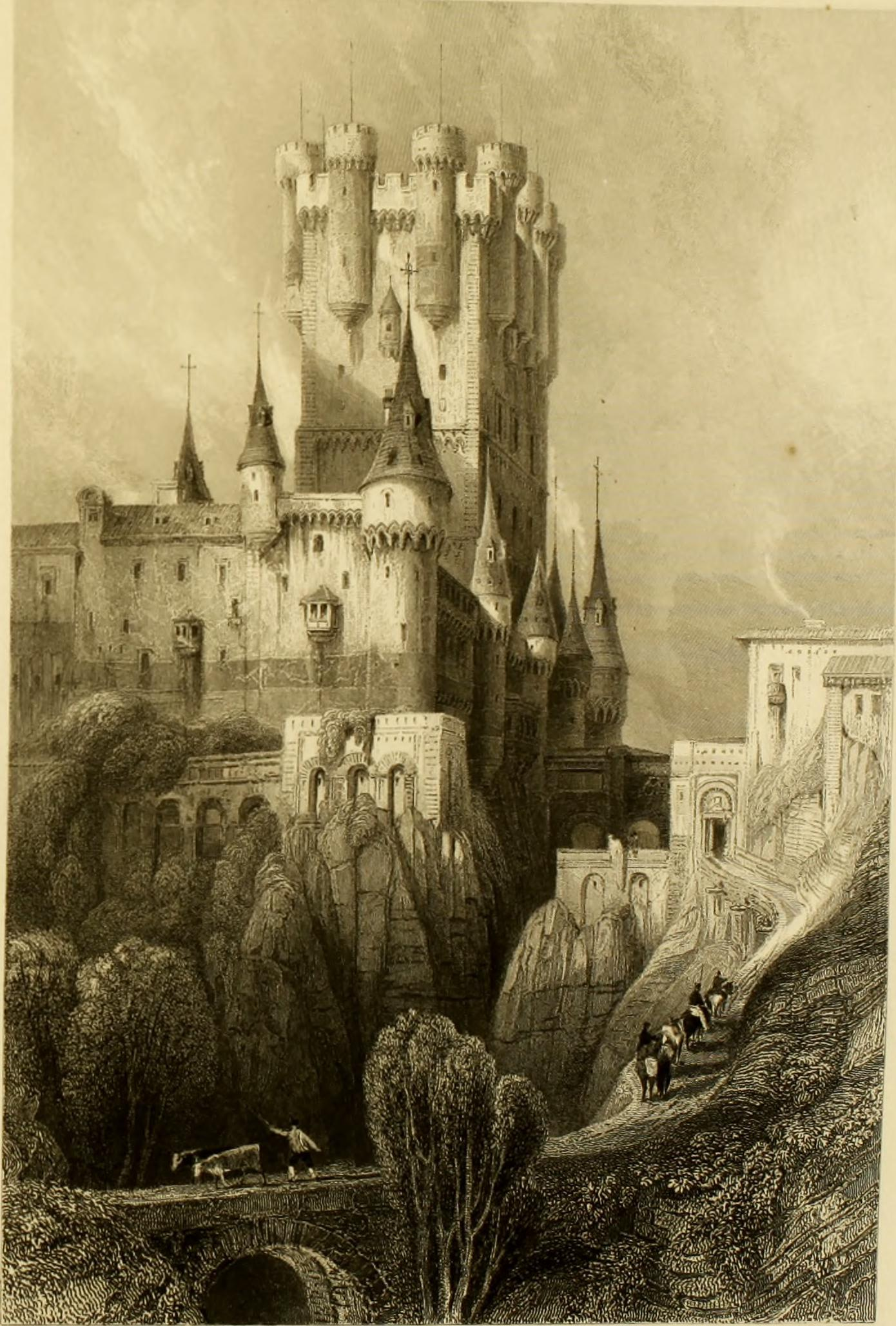
Painting of the Alcázar of Segovia, circa 1838 by David Roberts

The Alcázar of Segovia, like many fortifications in Spain, started off as a Roman castrum, but apart from the foundations, little of the original structure remains. The alcázar was built by the Berber Almoravid dynasty. Almoravid art and architecture is scarcely talked about in scholarship in part because so little of the physical work has survived in Spain. Furthermore, the Almoravid dynasty was short-lived and therefore much of the art and architecture of that period was subsequently destroyed or converted by their successors.

The first reference to this castle was in 1120, around 32 years after the city of Segovia was conquered by the Christians (during the Reconquista when King Alfonso VI reconquered lands to the south of the Duero river, down to Toledo and beyond). In 1258, during the reign of King Alfonso X of Castile (r. 1252–1284), an intense thunderstorm caused a fire that destroyed several rooms, leading to centuries-long reconstruction during the reigns of various kings.

The Alcázar of Segovia was one of the favourite royal residences starting in the 13th century that in turn, led to secular patronage to the city of Segovia. It was during this period that most of the current building was constructed by the House of Trastámara.

In 1258, parts of the Alcázar had to be rebuilt by King Alfonso X after a cave-in and the Hall of Kings was built to house Parliament soon after. However, the single largest contributor to the continuing construction of the Alcázar was King John II of Castile who built the "New Tower" (John II tower as it is known today).

The Castilian Crown maintained multiple artillery units, strategically stationed in royal fortresses, including the Alcázar of Segovia. In 1465, Pascual de Medrano served as an artilleryman at the Royal Alcázar of Segovia, receiving a salary of 5,000 maravedís for upkeep and 8,550 for provisions. In 1474, the Alcázar played a major role in the rise of Queen Isabella I. On 12 December news of King Henry IV's death in Madrid reached Segovia and Isabella immediately took refuge within the walls of the Alcázar where she received the support of Andres Cabrera and Segovia's council. She was enthroned the next day as Queen of Castile and León.

The next major renovation at the Alcázar was conducted by King Philip II after his marriage to Anna of Austria. He added the sharp slate spires to reflect the castles of central Europe. In 1587, architect Francisco de Mora completed the main garden and the School of Honor areas of the castle.

During his visit to Spain known as the "Spanish match", Prince Charles of England visited the Alcázar in 1623, after dining at Valsain. He was entertained by Luis Jerónimo de Cabrera, 4th Count of Chinchón, who was then keeper of the Alcázar. Prince Charles was shown the Galley Room or "second great hall" with the heraldry of Catherine of Lancaster. In the evening there was a torchlit masque involving 32 mounted knights. Prince Charles gave the Count of Chinchón a jewel and rewarded the poet Don Juan de Torres for his verses. He left early in the morning for Santa María la Real de Nieva.

The restoration of the Royal College of Artillery was among the many reforms conducted under the reign of King Charles III of Spain (r. 1759–1788). He appointed Count Félix Gazzola as the director of the artillery corps, who made the executive decision to install the academy in the Segovian fortress in the Alcázar. At its opening in 1764, the military college stood as a symbol of the city's new age of progress in political and military education.

On 6 March 1862, another fire occurred at the castle, destroying the sumptuous ceilings of the private rooms that were reserved exclusively for the nobility. As demonstrated in the engravings by José María Avrial and Flores in 1839, the structures were restored to their previous appearances.

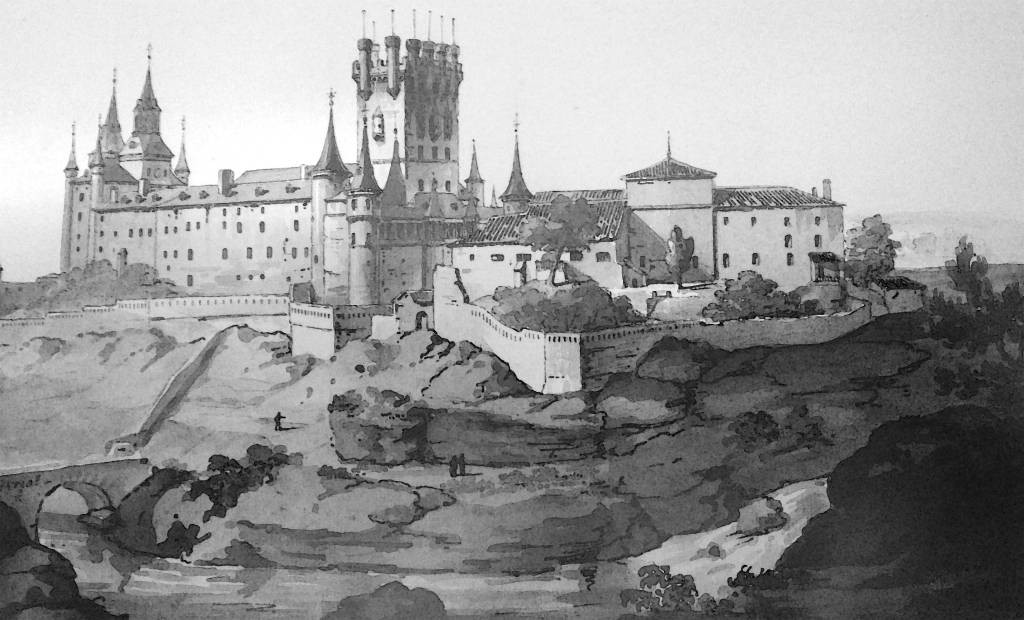
Etching of the Alcázar of Segovia ( c. 1842) by José María Avrial y Flores

In 1896, King Alfonso XIII ordered the Alcázar to be handed over to the Ministry of War as a military college.

The Board of Trustees of the Alcázar of Segovia was created by the Decree of the Presidency of the Government, on 18 January 1951. The purpose of this was to ensure cultural, artistic, and historical preservation of the Alcázar's triple function as a royal castle, military precinct, and military academy.

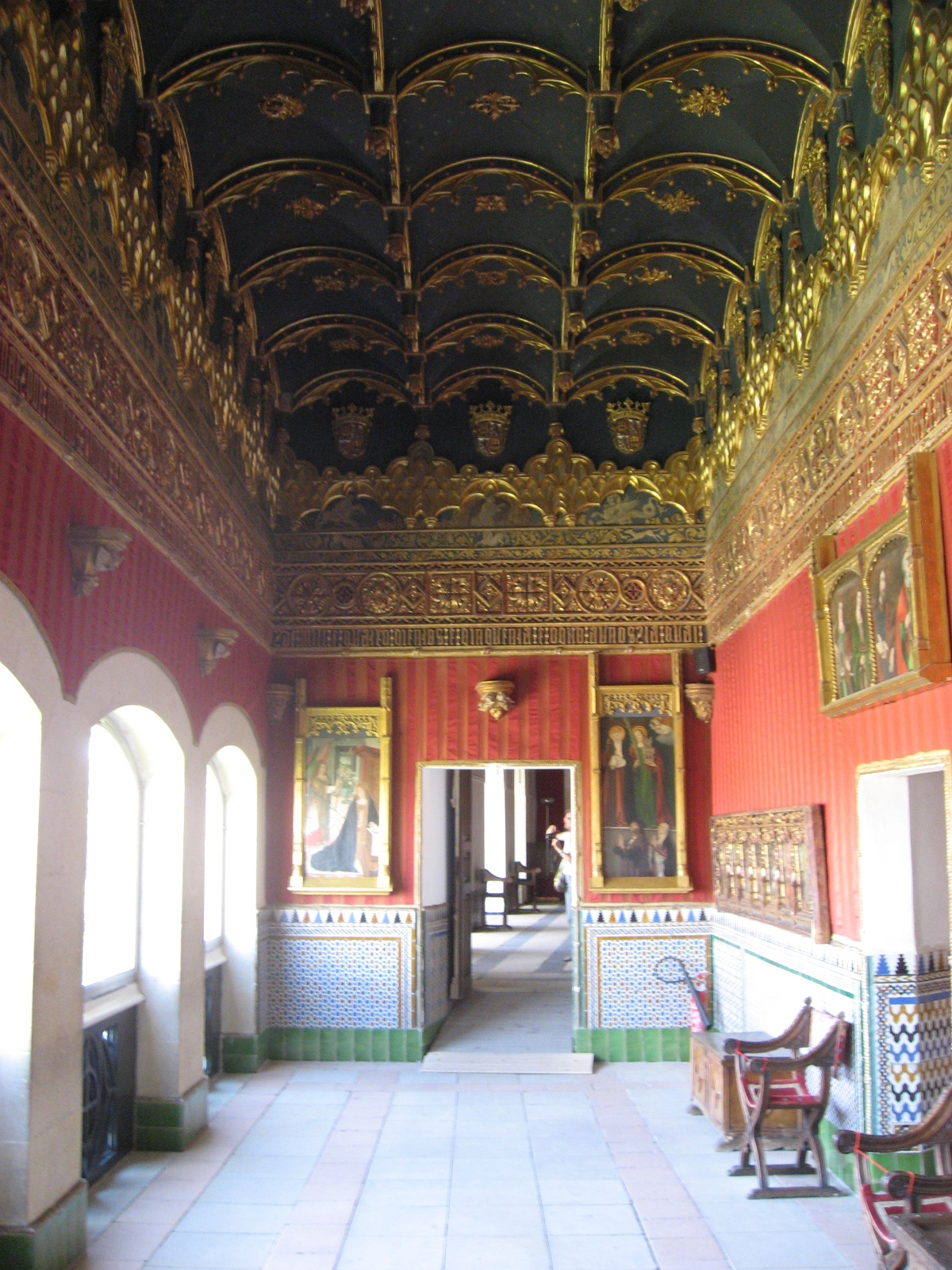
The Belt Room

== Description ==
The exterior of the castle has a Herrerian style courtyard, moat, drawbridge, and keep. The interior rooms include a chapel and several noble rooms (cuartos del Trono, de la Galera, de las Piñas, de los Reyes and others) that can be visited today. A triumphal arch, located on the corner of the south-east part of the palace, just beyond the moat, was likely ornamented with heraldic devices and served as a grand entrance to the alcázar. However, today it no longer survives. It was changed during the Habsburg period sometime during the 16th century.

The castle sits on a hill overlooking the city, with four towers, and several halls that are constructed with barrel vaults and twin windows. In the interior, the halls and rooms were decorated with great luxury and beauty by Mudéjar painters and artists.

Currently, it houses an Armory Museum and the General Military Archive of Segovia, the oldest historical archive of the Spanish Armed Forces.

=== Tower of John II of Castile ===
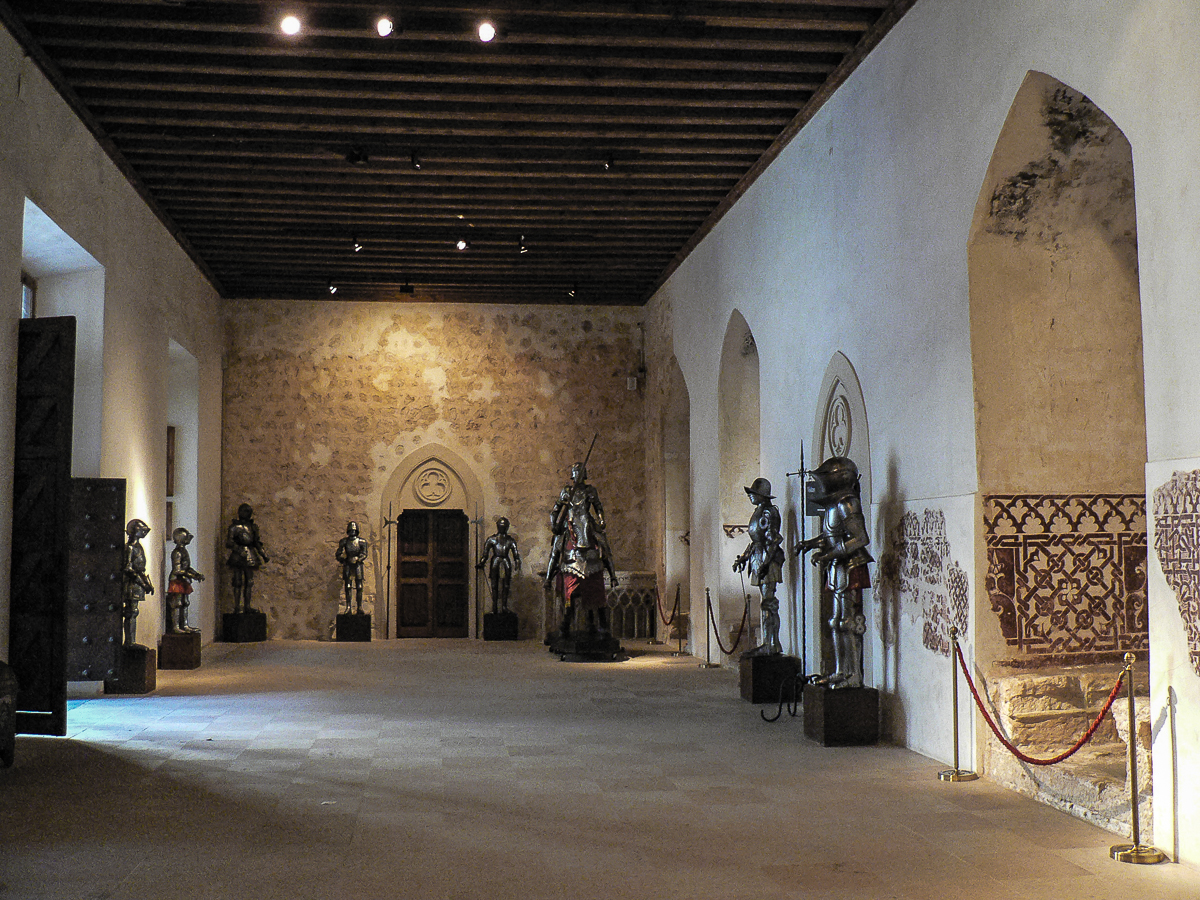
Hall of the Old Palace

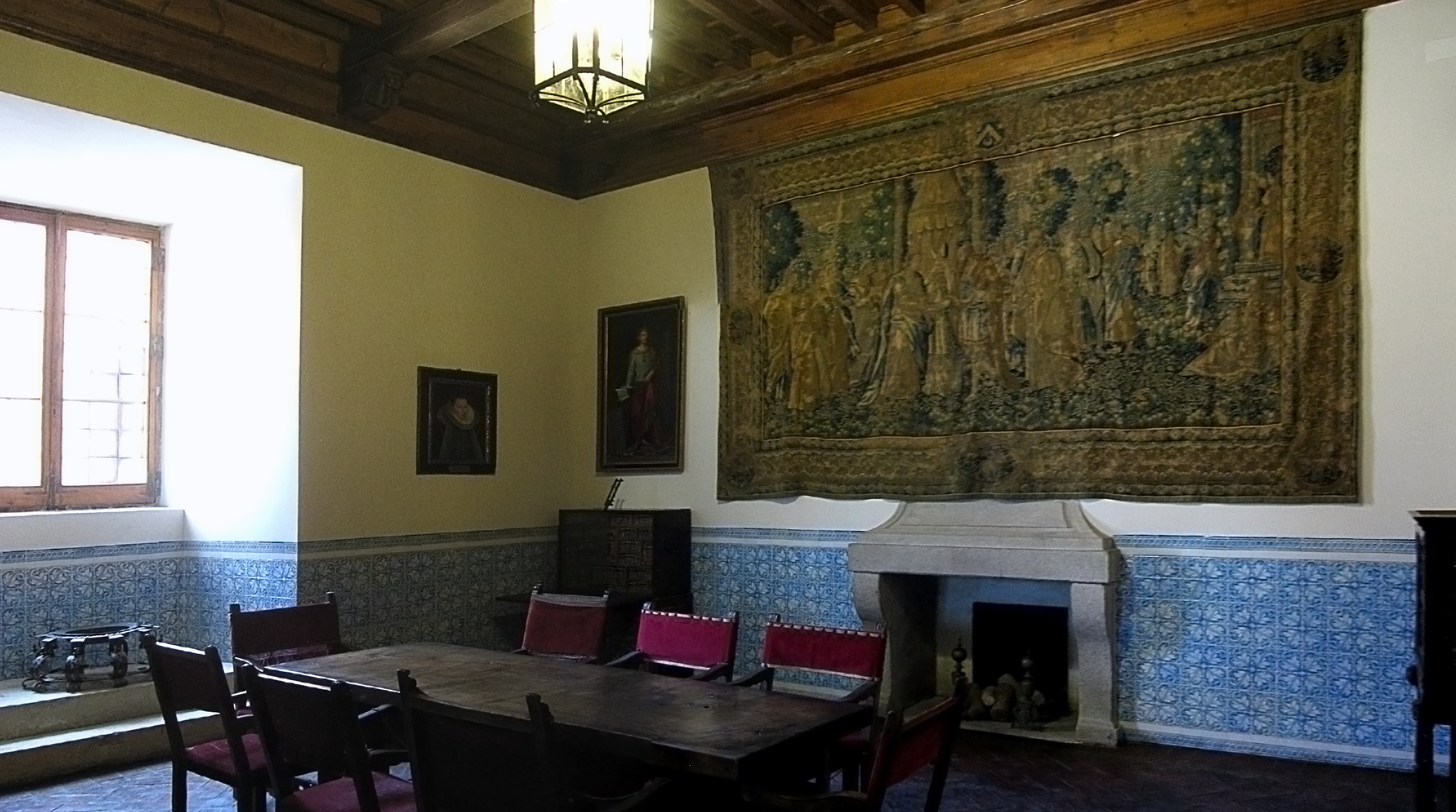
Fireplace Hall

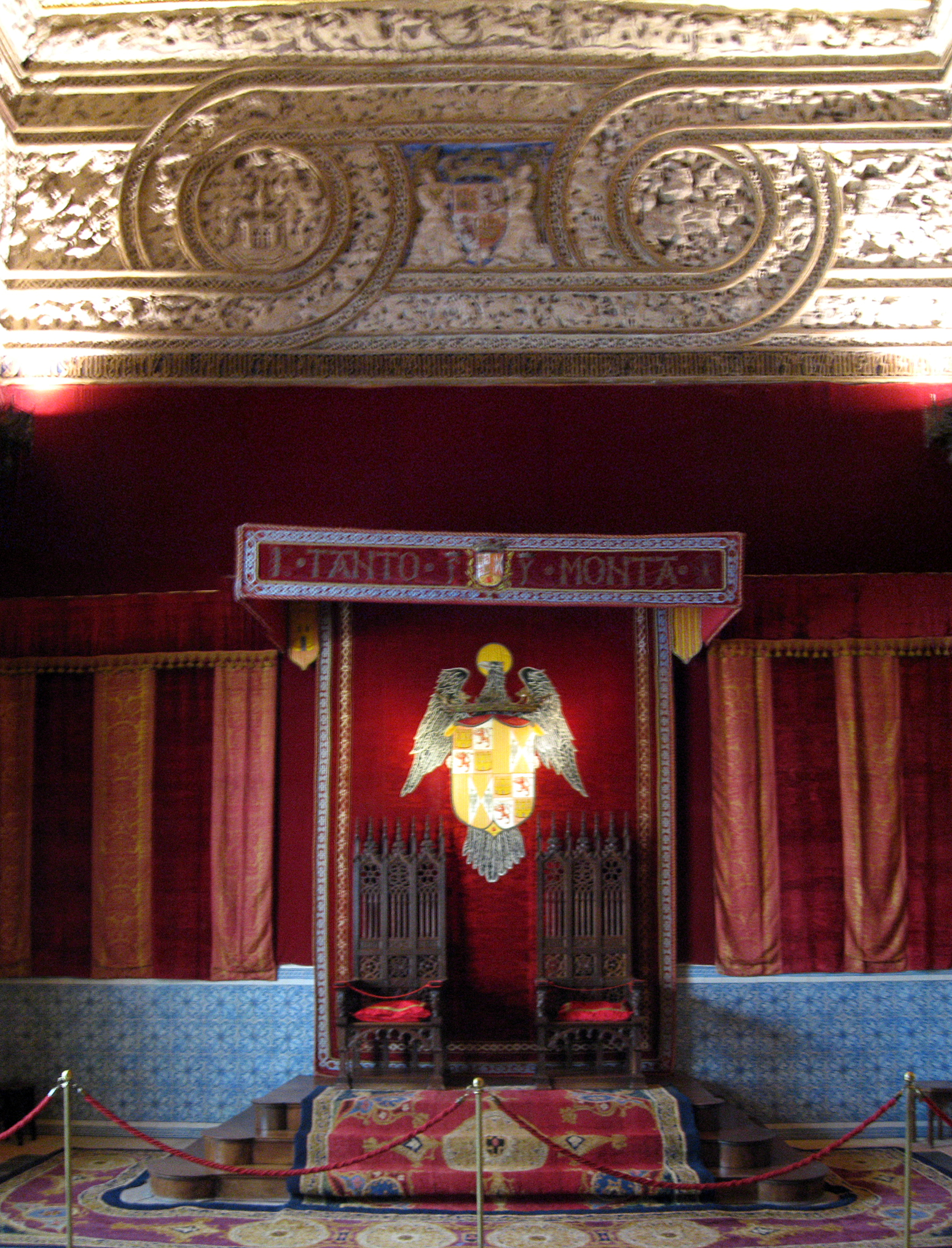
View of the Throne Room, with the motto of the Catholic Monarchs on the front of the dossal

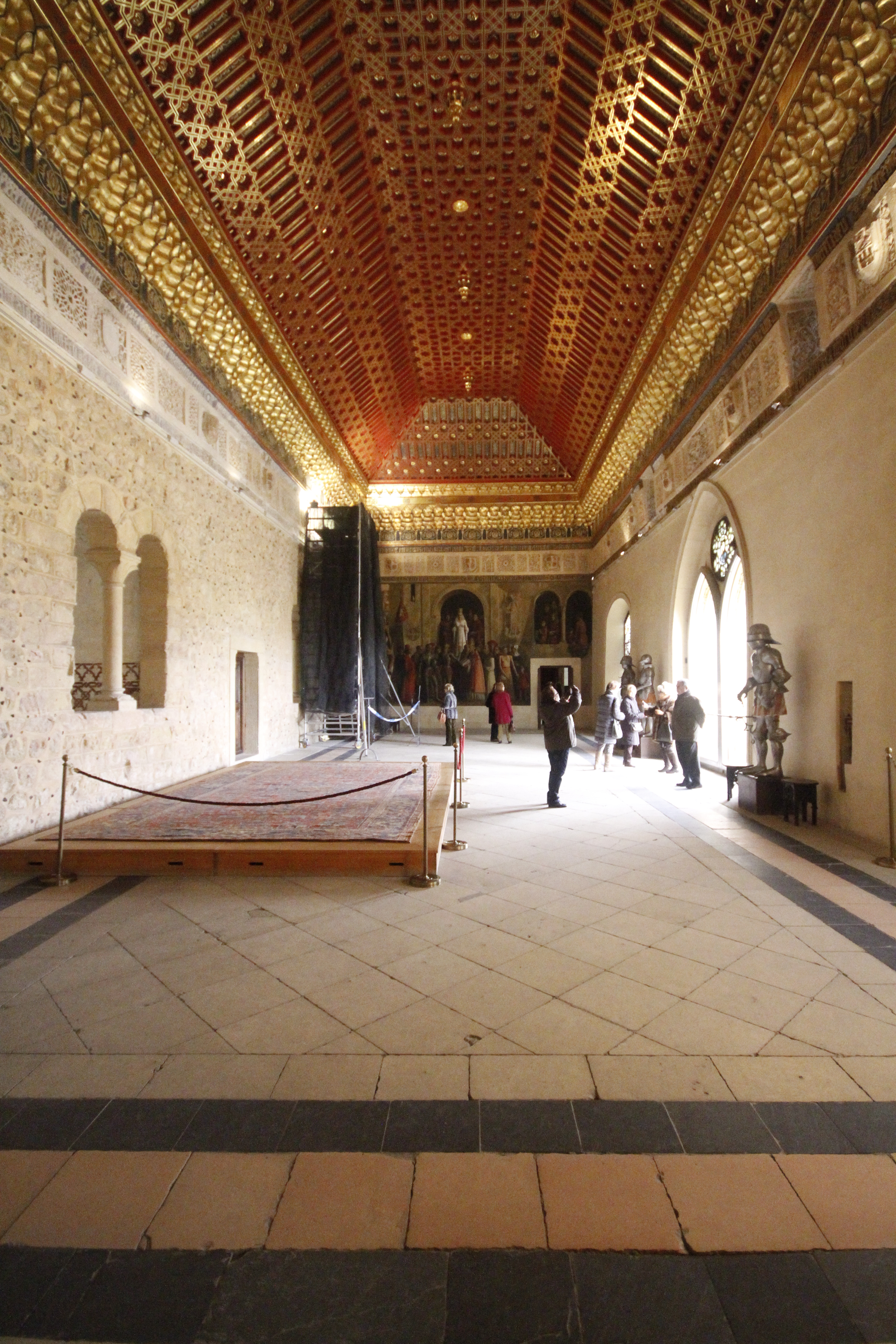
Hall of the Galley, with the mural of the coronation of Isabella I of Castile in the background

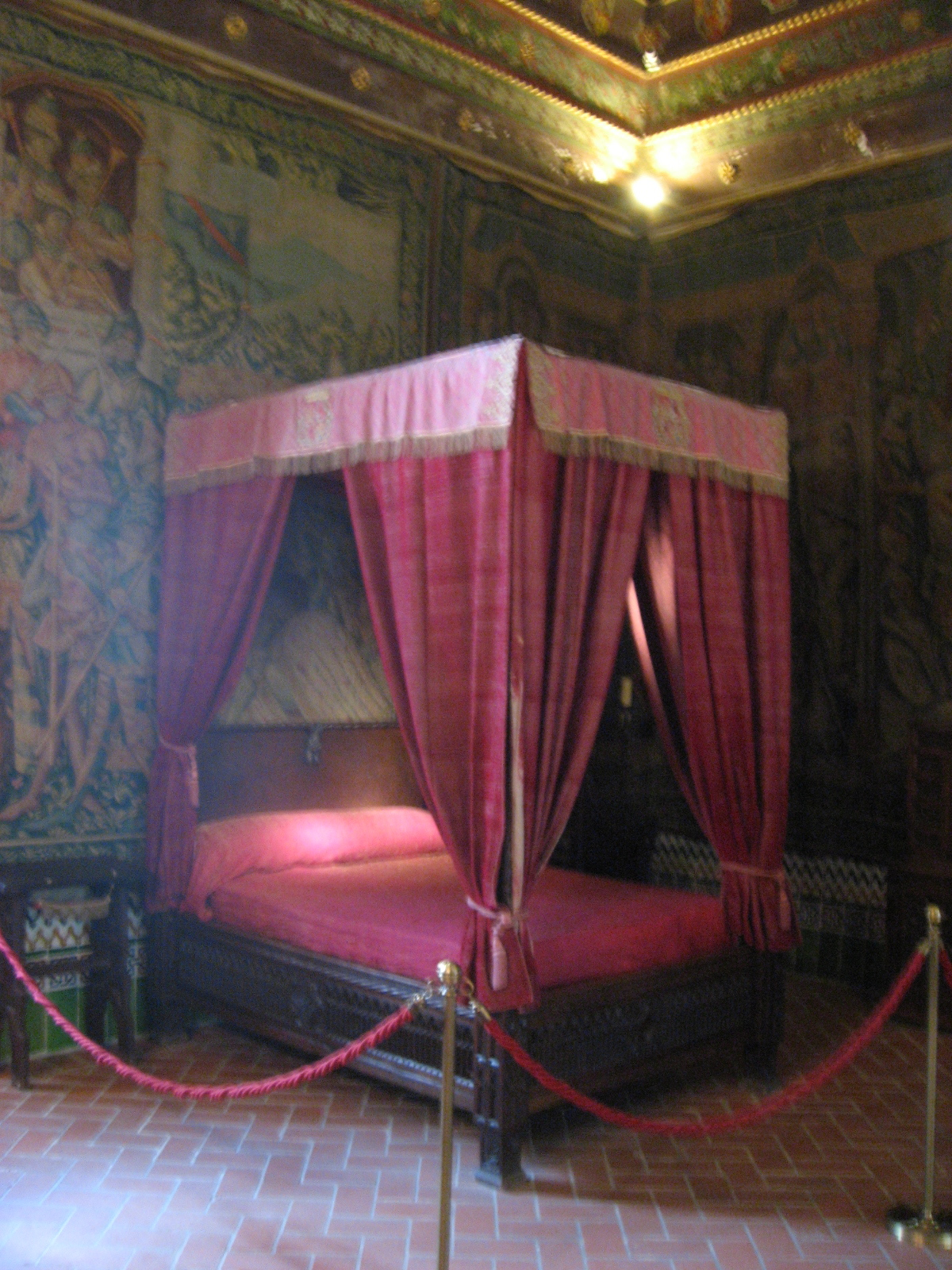
Royal Chamber

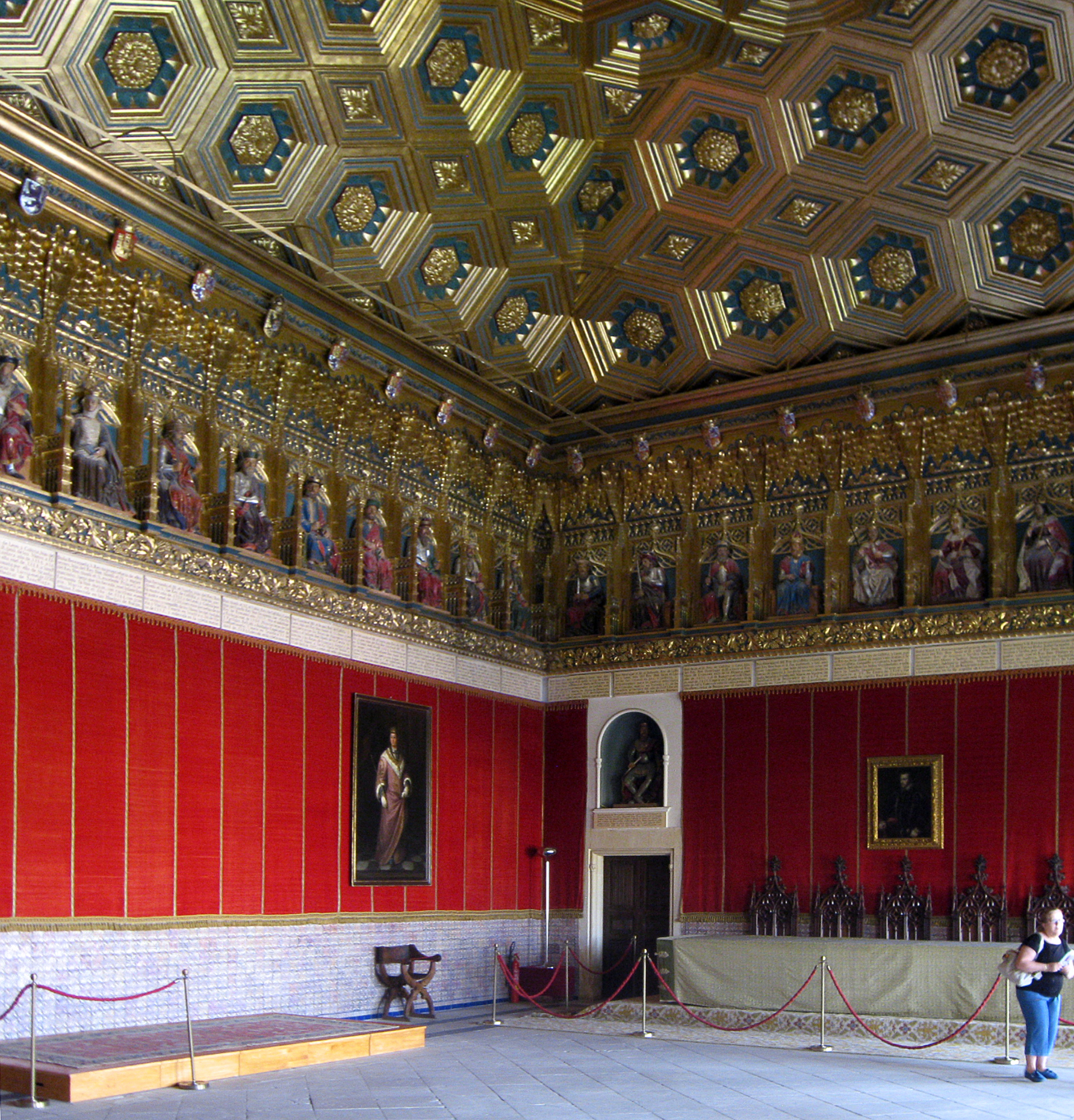
Hall of the Kings

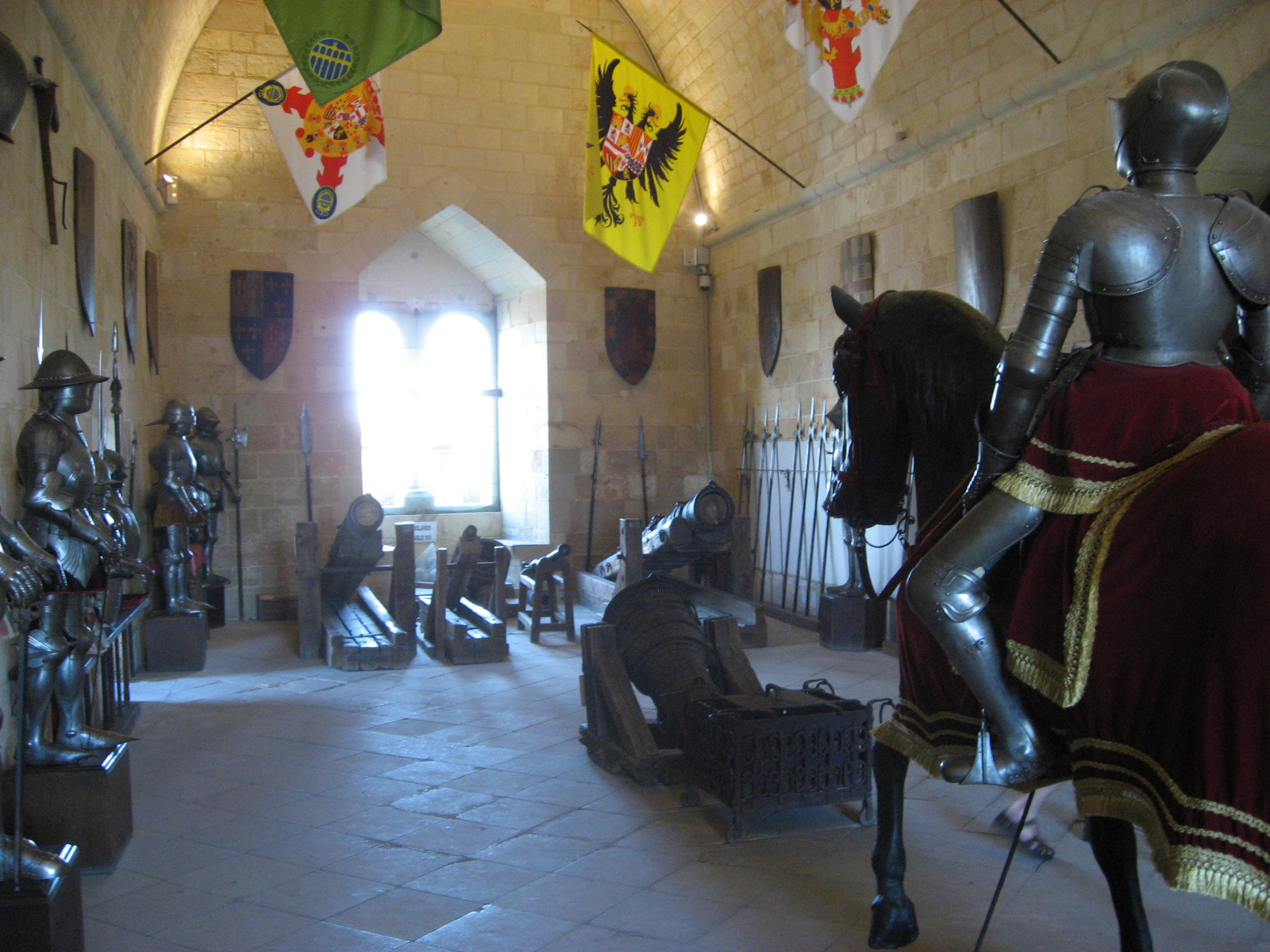
Armory room

The tower of King John II of Castile (r. 1406–1454) was built during the first half of the 15th century. The style is notably recognized as Spanish Gothic architecture, with influences from Islamic art, such as a horseshoe arch found during renovations in the souther-side of the tower. The tower culminates in a large panoramic terrace with two pointed arches of varying heights built into the walls of the eastern and western portions of the tower. On the east-side of the tower, a large, doubled Gothic window that reached to the floor and facing the city of Segovia was built so that the king's entire body could be seen by others as he stood, framed by the window.

The side that projects towards the city was initially used as a parade ground, which was common in military architecture. There are two steep and spiral staircases with 156 steps that ascend to the top of the tower. At the end of first section, there is a guard room. Attached to the front wall is a bed where the watchman of the tower would have slept.

=== Interior rooms ===
According to The Illustrated Magazine of Art (1853)

The interior of the Castle of Segovia is in perfect accordance with the magnificence of its exterior. Many apartments are decorated with delicate traceries and pendant ornaments, in the style of the Alhambra, and, like those of the Alcázar of Seville, were executed by Arabian workmen during the Christian dominion of the fourteenth century, for in many places the crowns of the kings of Castille may be seen, surrounded by Latin mottoes [sic] and extracts from the Koran.

==== Hall of the Old Palace ====
Its construction corresponds to the reign of Alfonso VIII of Castile. In it the twinned windows that gave light to the palace are conserved, since the wall in which they were was the exterior wall of the old palace. The Mudéjar-style socles located between the windows come from a 13th-century house in the nearby Las Canonjías district. The decoration was completed with a set of German-style armor from the 15th century.

==== Hall of the Fireplace ====
Corresponds to the ordination of the fortress in the time of Philip II of Spain. The furniture is from the 16th century. On the walls you can see a portrait of Philip II and another of Philip III, a 16th century Flemish tapestry with the subject of Our Lady's betrothal and a curious representation where you can contemplate the appearance of the Alcázar before the reform of the roofs and where you can also see the Former Cathedral of Segovia that was located in the current square of the Alcázar.

==== Throne Room (Salón del Solio) ====
The walls of the Throne Room mostly consist of portraits of various kings, which are part of the collection of kings commissioned by Queen Isabella II of Spain. Both portraits are signed by their respective artists: the portrait of Isabella I of Castile is signed by Madrazo, while the portrait of Ferdinand II of Aragon is signed by Montañés.

In addition, there is a depiction of the ruler himself "en siella" (seated). This image corresponds to the fact that extant written documents from the fourteenth century actually referred to the throne room as the "rey en siella" (king sitting on the throne; enthroned king). Often these rooms were used for different types of political ceremonies, including the receiving of foreign embassies, banquets, musical performances, and literary events. The rooms could be decorated with different types of objects, like tableware and textiles (including tapestries) that allowed for the space to be transformed to suit the particular event.

==== Hall of the Galley (Sala de la Galera) ====
The mother of John II, Queen Catherine of Lancaster (r. 1390–1406) commissioned the construction of the Hall of the Galley in 1412.

The name of the room derives from the coffered ceiling that was shaped like an inverted ship hull.

The frieze is made of Mudéjar plaster with a double inscription: the upper one includes a prayer related to the Eucharist and the lower one offers information about the work displayed in the hall.

There are two stained glass windows in the Hall of the Gallery. One of these windows portrays Henry III of Castile (r. 1390–1406) and his family. The second window portrays King Henry II of Castile (r. 1366–1367) and scenes of the death of Peter I and John II. A painting by Muñoz de Pablos hangs on a wall in the gallery depicting the coronation of the Isabella I of Castile as Queen of Castile and of León in the church of San Miguel of Segovia.

==== Hall of las Piñas (Sala de las Piñas) ====
The inspiration for the name of this room comes from the decorative motifs in the Artesonado ceiling that features many pineapple-like motifs. The stained glass window portrays King Alfonso VII (r. 1126–1157) with his daughter, Queen Berengaria of Castile (r. 1217).

==== Royal Chamber ====
In its walls you can see scenes of the family life of the Catholic Monarchs. The bed has a brocade cover woven in gold.

==== Hall of the Kings (Sala de los Reyes) ====
King Alfonso X (r. 1252–1284) commissioned the construction of the Hall of the Kings. The space has ornamental ceilings and the upper portions of the four walls are decorated with a five-layer cloth.

The design and layout of the Hall of the Kings borrowed iconography from the Palace of Alhambra. In the 1400s, King Henry IV of Castile (r. 1454–1474) played a large role in the final design of the Hall of the Kings. Historical and literary references are evident in the decoration, including the storied medieval Castilian knight, El Cid.

King Henry IV's decision to incorporate a gallery that depicts various rulers of Castile and León, in sitting positions, into the hall's decoration was designed to demonstrate the political legitimacy of those in power during 15th century Spain. Similar imagery can be found in the King's Hall (Sala de los Reyes) (also sometimes identified as the Hall of Justice) at the Alhambra, where an image of ten seated rulers found in the ceiling vault are believed by some scholars to represent different emirs from the Nasrid dynasty. Other scholars, however, have argued that due to the presence of small coats of arms below the figures and at the two ends of the image, the scene likely represents the ruler, in this case, Muhammad V of Granada (r. 1354–1359), accompanied by a group of wise men, various teachers and literary figures, is a meeting known as a maŷlis. Whoever is illustrated in the imagery in the Alcázar of Segovia's Hall of Kings, the message concerns the representation of political power, dominance, and legitimacy.

Philip II of Spain (r. 1580–1598) commissioned Hernando de Ávila to design one of the statues that represented the kings of Asturias, León and Castile. One of the paintings in the room is a portrait of King Philip II of Spain and the others are portraits of two of his wives, Elisabeth of Valois (r. 1559–1568) and Anna of Austria (r. 1570–1580).

==== Room of the Belt ====
Its name is because of a long golden lace attached to the walls surrounding the room.

==== Chapel (Capilla) ====
The chapel at the Alcázar of Segovia houses Adoration of the Magi (c. 1600) by Italian painter, architect, and sculpture Bartolomeo Carducci. Due to its historical significance and architectural accomplishments, the castle hosted numerous events. One of the most famous events at the Alcázar was the wedding of Philip II of Spain with his niece, Anna of Austria in 1570, which took place in the castle's chapel.

==== Weapons or Armory Room ====
The Alcázar has housed the armory of the House of Trastámara since old times, and was the precedent of the collections of weapons that finally met in the Royal Armoury of Madrid.

==== Museum of the Royal College of Artillery (Museo del Real Colegio de Artillería) ====
The Royal College of Artillery was divided into two parts: the academy and as a meeting place for the military and cadets in training.

To attend the school, applicants were exclusively chosen from the noble estate or related to army captains and artillery corps. The allure of the school consisted of not only its scientific and military accomplishments, but in its integration of teachings of Christian ideals.

== In popular culture ==
- The Alcázar was used by Orson Welles in the 1965 film Chimes at Midnight.
- Depicted as Koka's castle, it is the first shown fortress in the manga Berserk.
- The Alcázar was used as the setting for Brobdingnag, the land of the giants, in the 1960 film The 3 Worlds of Gulliver.
- The castle also served as the French home of Sir Lancelot du Lac, Joyous Gard, in the film Camelot.
- The castle's silhouette and overall appearance inspired the castle in Disney's 1937 animated classic, Snow White and the Seven Dwarfs.
- Sylvain Castle, a dungeon in the 1995 action RPG Terranigma, is based on it.
- The castle is used as the setting for Ghealdan in The Wheel of Time.
