= Dome of the Chain =

Islamic building in Al-Aqsa, Jerusalem

Coordinates: 31°46′41.00″N 35°14′08.94″E

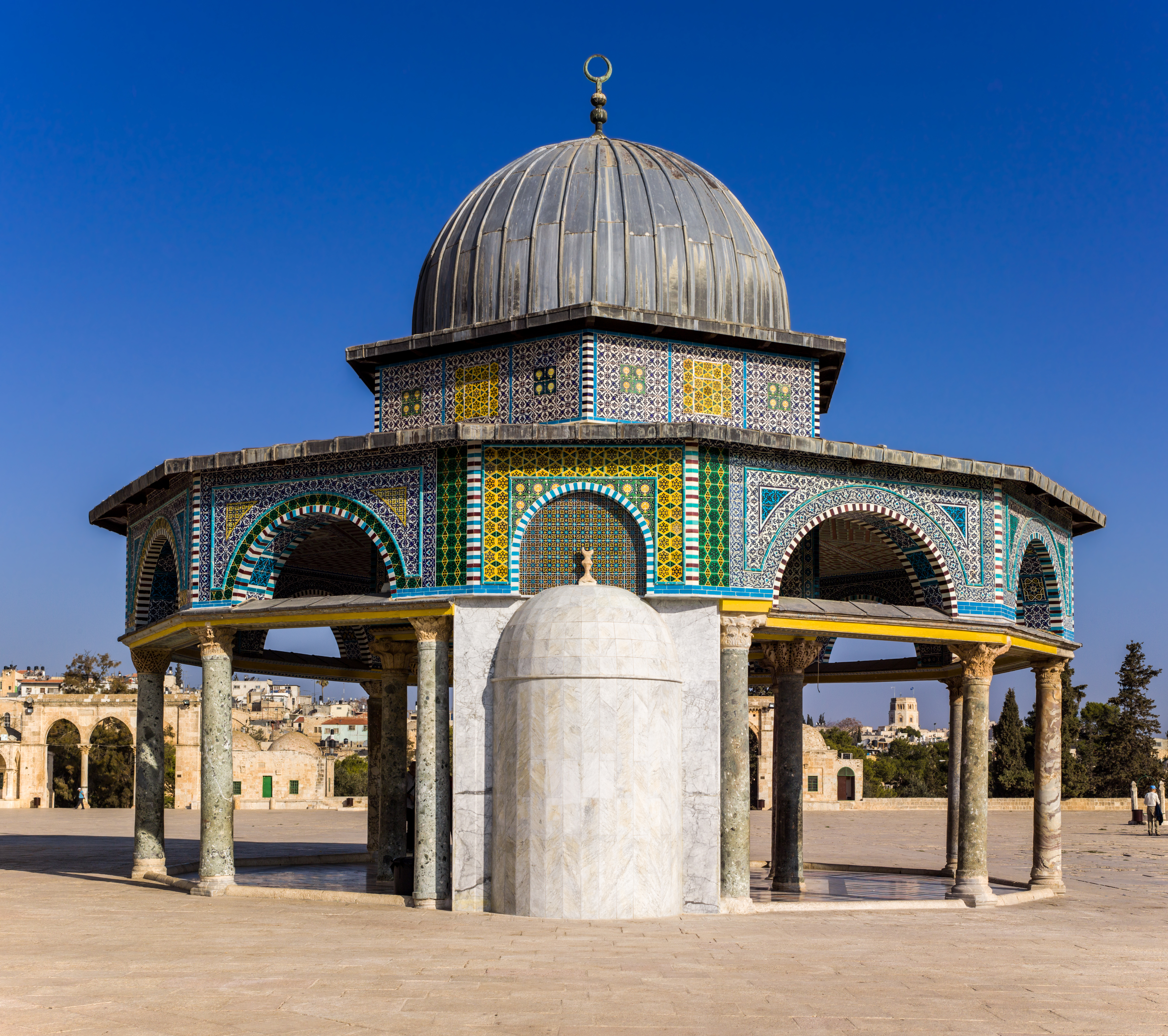
The Dome of the Chain outside the Dome of the Rock

Dome of the Chain (Arabic: قبة السلسلة, romanized: Qubbat al-Silsilah) is an Islamic free-standing domed building located adjacently east of the Dome of the Rock in the Al-Aqsa Mosque compound in the Old City of Jerusalem. It is one of many small buildings that can be found scattered around the Al-Aqsa Mosque. Its exact historical use and significance are under scholarly debate. Erected in 691–92 CE, the Dome of the Chain is one of the oldest surviving structures at the Al-Aqsa Mosque compound.

It was built by the Umayyads, became a Christian chapel under the Crusaders, was restored as an Islamic prayer house by the Ayyubids, and has been renovated by the Mamluks, Ottomans and the Jordanian-based waqf.

== Architecture ==
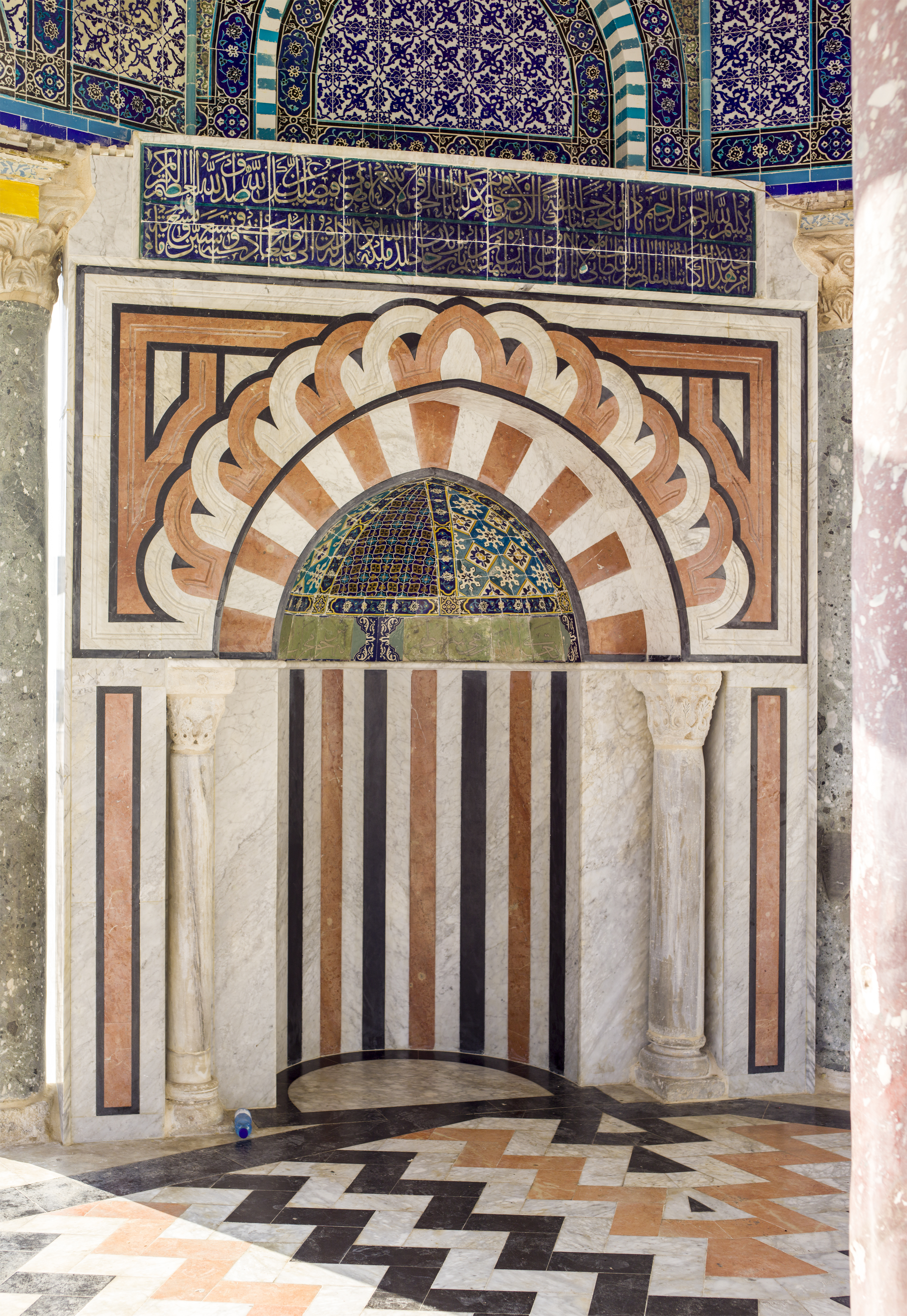
The mihrab

The building consists of a domed structure with two concentric open arcades, that is: with no lateral walls closing it in. The dome, resting on a hexagonal drum, is made of timber and is supported by six columns which together create the inner arcade. The second, outer row of eleven columns creates an eleven-sided outer arcade. The qibla wall contains the mihrab or prayer niche and is flanked by two smaller columns. There are a total of seventeen columns in the structure, excluding the mihrab. One of the oldest historical sources (903 CE) states that initially there used to be twenty columns. However, examination undertaken in 1975–76 under the later pavement showed that the structure has not been altered since its construction, contradicting early descriptions. The Dome of the Chain has a diameter of 14 meters (46 ft), making it the third largest building on the Haram after the al-Aqsa Mosque and the Dome of the Rock.

The columns and capitals used in the structure date to pre-Islamic times. The Umayyad design of the building has largely remained unaltered by later restorations.

== History ==
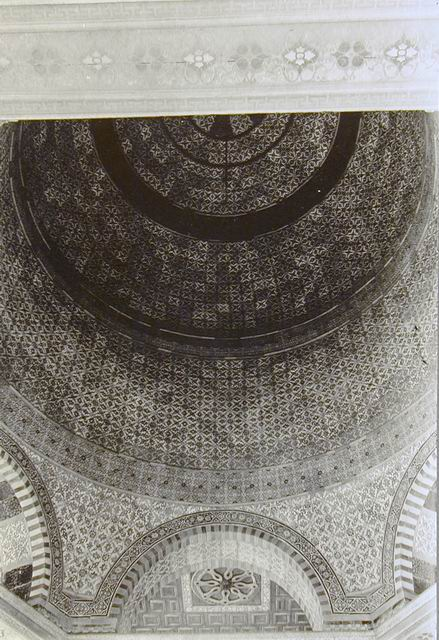
Inner view of the dome, 1919

=== Construction date ===
The Dome of the Chain is counted among the most ancient buildings standing on the Al Aqsa Mosque enclave and was built by the Umayyads. The original floor is on the same level as the floor of the Umayyad Dome of the Rock, the column bases are similar to those of other Umayyad buildings and all date to the same period, and the position of the Dome of the Chain seems to correlate well with the original and current mihrab of al-Aqsa Mosque (see Omphalos). Additionally, the earliest Muslim source found to date (ʿAbd al-Malik ibn Habīb, writing in 852 CE) clearly attributes the building to Umayyad caliph Abd al-Malik.

=== Umayyad period ===
Ibn Habib, an Arab scholar from the Umayyad-ruled al-Andalus, left the first mention of the Dome of the Chain. He wrote that it was built in 691/2 by the Umayyad caliph Abd al-Malik, the builder of the Dome of the Rock, a fact widely accepted. Extensive restoration works in the 1970s have shown that the building has kept its general appearance since first being built, with the exception of six now blocked rounded-arch windows in the hexagonal drum supporting the dome.

=== Crusader/Ayyubid period ===
When the Crusaders invaded the Levant in 1099, they identified the dome as the spot where Saint James the Less, whom they saw as the brother of Jesus, fell when he was thrown down from the Temple, and transformed the building into a chapel dedicated to him next to the Templum Domini. In 1187, the building and the whole city were retaken by the Muslims under Saladin. In 1199–1200, the ceiling and pavings were renewed by the ruling Ayyubids. The Christians re-used the place in 1240–1244, before it reverted to Muslim use. 13th-century Christian pilgrims associate it not only with St James, but also with the place where Jesus met the adulterous woman. Pringle suggests that only in the Crusader period walls would have been built to close the Chapel of St James, which would explain a pilgrim reporting of the chapel being "excellently decorated with paintings" (Theoderic, c. 1172).

=== Mamluk, Ottoman periods and later ===
The structure was renovated by the Mamluk sultan Baybars (r. 1260–1277). The latter's renovations likely involved the refacing of the mihrab with marble. An inscription above the mihrab informs that in 1561, under the Ottoman sultan Suleiman the Magnificent, the structure was decorated in glazed tiles; in 1760/61, more tile work was done. The last major restoration undertaken at the Dome of the Chain was commissioned by the Islamic waqf of Jerusalem in 1975–76.

== Religious significance ==
=== David's and Solomon's Place of Judgment ===
The tradition connecting the Dome with King David and his court of justice is strictly Islamic, and all its sources date to the Early Muslim period.

Three Muslim sources, from Ibn 'Abd Rabbihi in 913, to Nāsir-i Khosro in 1047, to 'Ali of Herat in 1173, connect the Dome with a chain from the time of either the "Children of Israel", David, or Solomon, where justice was administered. This would happen either by divine intervention, the chain hung by David not allowing liars to touch it, or directly by Solomon, the wise son of David. All these sources are testimony to the fact that in the Early Muslim period, several centuries into Muslim rule in Jerusalem, the Al Aqsa Mosque is claimed to be connected in Islamic traditions to its Jewish biblical legacy. The sources referring to the "David's chain" tradition are all Islamic and dating to the Early Muslim period, suggesting that there has been a scholarly effort of legitimising the rule of the Umayyads by associating them with Davidic justice. A 12th-century author, al-Idrisi, even called the site the "Holy of Holies".

According to Mujir ad-Din (15th century), the Dome of the Chain owes its name to an ancient legend connecting it to King Solomon.

Among the wonders of the Holy House is the chain, which Solomon, son of David, suspended between Heaven and Earth, to the east of the Rock, where the Dome of the Chain now stands. The chain had one characteristic. If two men approached it to solve a point of litigation, only the honest and upright man could take hold of it; the unjust man saw it move out of his reach.

Mujir ad-Din offers an explanation to why the chain is no more there: A man refused to return 100 golden dinars to the rightful owner. He melted down the coins, pouring the gold into his walking-stick. Before swearing that he has repaid his due, he asked the owner to hold his stick, and the chain allowed him to touch it. After giving back the stick to the liar, the money's owner swore that the gold had not been returned to him, while also holding the chain. With people present at the trial baffled over how both testimonies could have been true, the chain withdrew to heaven in disgust.

Much earlier than Mujir ad-Din, Wahb ibn Munabbih (d. 725–37), a transmitter of Israʼiliyyat and probable convert from Judaism, offers a drier explanation, writing that the chain was withdrawn still during David's lifetime and would return at the End of Days.

=== Muhammad Meeting the Maidens of Jannah ===
According to al-Wasiti, one tradition identifies this location as the place where Muhammad, on his night journey to Jerusalem, met the black eyed maidens of Paradise (hur al-'ayn).

=== Omphalos ===
The Dome stands exactly at the geometric centre of the esplanade which houses the al-Aqsa compound, the Haram, at the spot where the two central axes meet. The central axes connect the centres of the opposing sides, and the Dome is also perfectly aligned on the long (approximately north-south) axis with what is presumed to be the oldest mihrab of the al-Aqsa Mosque. This mihrab stands inside the 'Mosque of Omar', i.e. the southeastern section of the al-Aqsa Mosque, which corresponds by tradition to the earliest mosque built on the Al Aqsa Mosque enclave. The 'mihrab of Omar' as seen today stands exactly in the middle of the qibla wall of the Temple Mount. It has been speculated that once the Dome of the Rock was built, the location of the main mihrab inside al-Aqsa Mosque has been repositioned on an axis with the centre of the Dome of the Rock, as it is until today, but the old position is preserved by the separate mihrab of the 'Mosque of Omar'.

According to these considerations, the Dome of the Chain is located at the omphalos, or navel, of the Al Aqsa Mosque, and indeed of the Earth as a whole –surrat al-arḍ in Arabic. The traditional "navel of the universe" in Judaism is at the Holy of Holies, in Islam at the Ka`ba in Mecca, and in Christianity in the Church of the Holy Sepulchre. The omphalos can be defined as a religious artifact or object. In association with the Dome of the Rock, this omphalos would be the tomb where Adam was found, and where the first man was created.

=== Site of Last Judgment ===
In Islamic tradition the Dome of the Chain marks the place where in the "end of days" the Last Judgment will take place, with a chain allowing passage only to the just and stopping all the sinful.

==== Umayyad symbolism ====
The placement of the Dome of the Chain at the omphalos of the holy precinct, the traditional place of Davidic justice, would have been indicative of the notion that the Umayyad Caliphs were direct descendants of the "Children of Ishmael", to which power would have been passed from the "Children of Israel". The Umayyads wanted to portray themselves as the inheritors of "Davidic justice", making them the rulers of the Day of Judgement. It is notable that the Dome of the Chain was reportedly where the Caliphs Sulayman b. 'Abd al-Malik (r. 715–16) and 'Umar b. 'Abd al-'Aziz (r. 717–20) received the oath of allegiance (bayʿa), and possibly the founder of the dynasty, Muʿawiya (r. 661–680), as well. The pledge of the oath of allegiance would have secured them as being the rightful divine leaders of Davidic justice, emphasized by the religious significance of the location.

The tradition of David's chain is rooted strictly in Islamic sources from the Early Muslim period, a fact suggesting that it was intentionally created to support Umayyad attempts at legitimising their rule.

== Theories ==
Some have claimed that the Dome of the Chain might have been built even before Islam took hold in Jerusalem. Myriam Rosen-Ayalon was the first to notice its location in the center of the complex, and theorized that it might be connected to the original Jewish Temple or traditions surrounding it.

The exact historical use of the dome is still widely debated. The Dome of the Chain has been speculated to have had a series of different purposes, which have not been confirmed. Thought by tradition to mark a place of holy judgment, it is speculated in Muslim sources to have been used in Umayyad times as a treasury, or a model for the construction of the Dome of the Rock. A 2015 Waqf brochure suggests that it was used as a lounge for the architects and builders of the Dome of the Rock. The Travels of a student of Nachmanides (ca. 1400) says that "In front of the temple [i.e. the Dome of the Rock] to the east is a building of pillars and a dome upon them. Seemingly this is because it is the site of the outer altar which stood in the Court of the Israelites [in the Second Temple]. We saw the Arabs dancing there on their festival day, 3,000 or so of them . . ."

=== Treasury ===
A theory that has been created about the Dome of the Chain's historical usage is that it could have been a treasury, or bayt al-māl. Some scholars, such as Muthīr al-Gharām and Mujīr al-Dīn speculate that the building could have been used as a traditional treasury, however the open structure of the building has created doubts amongst art historians on this interpretation. Ahmad al-Wasiti, writing around 1019, lists among the buildings standing in the Haram grounds the Dome of the Chain and the Treasury, therefore drawing a clear distinction between the two.

Umayyad treasuries were built next to the mosques, and the Dome of the Rock is not a mosque. The typical Umayyad treasury was often built as a closed structure, with one row of columns and a dome. The Dome of the Chain has a dome, like typical treasuries, but has an open structure and two rows of columns, which has led this theory to be abandoned by historians.

=== Model for the Dome of the Rock ===
The first Muslim scholar to present the theory that the Dome of the Chain has been built as a small-scale model of the Dome of the Rock, constructed next to the building site of the larger structure, was Mujīr al-Dīn in 1496 CE. This is quite late in history, it seems to be his own invention, and it has since been disproved. A model would not have been left standing after the completion of the actual building, nor does the open structure of the Dome of the Chain mirror the layout of the Dome of the Rock.

Like the Dome of the Rock, the Dome of the Chain consists of two concentric polygons, with columns bound together by arcades and wooden beams. The Dome of the Rock is three times the size of the Dome of the Chain and the ground plan and height are relatively proportional. What goes against this theory is the contrast between the perfect octagonal symmetry of both archways of the Dome of the Rock, and the mix of a hexagonal inner arcade and an (initially) fourteen-sided outer one for the Dome of the Chain. The open structure, lacking walls, is an additional issue, along with the extreme proximity of the two, the smaller structure staying in the way of the builders of the larger one. There are other late sources presenting it as a model, but they are not deemed convincing by modern scholars.

== Later use ==
=== Umayyad site for the oath of allegiance ===
See Umayyad symbolism.

=== Ottoman courthouse ===
In the sixteenth century, the first century of Ottoman rule in the Levant, the Dome of the Chain was used as a courthouse, reconnecting to the old tradition of Davidic justice at the site.

== Gallery ==
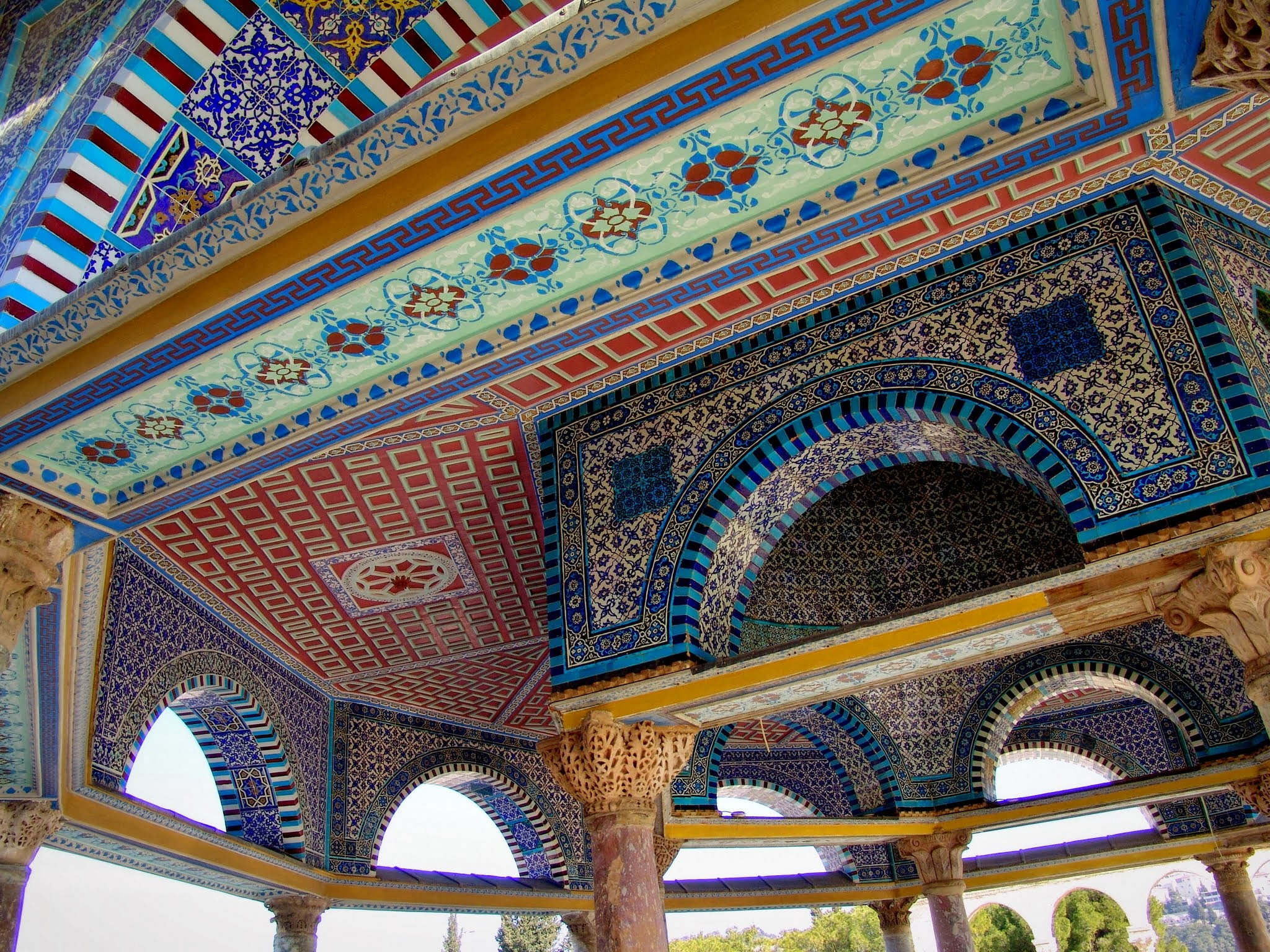
Dome of the Chain, interior detail

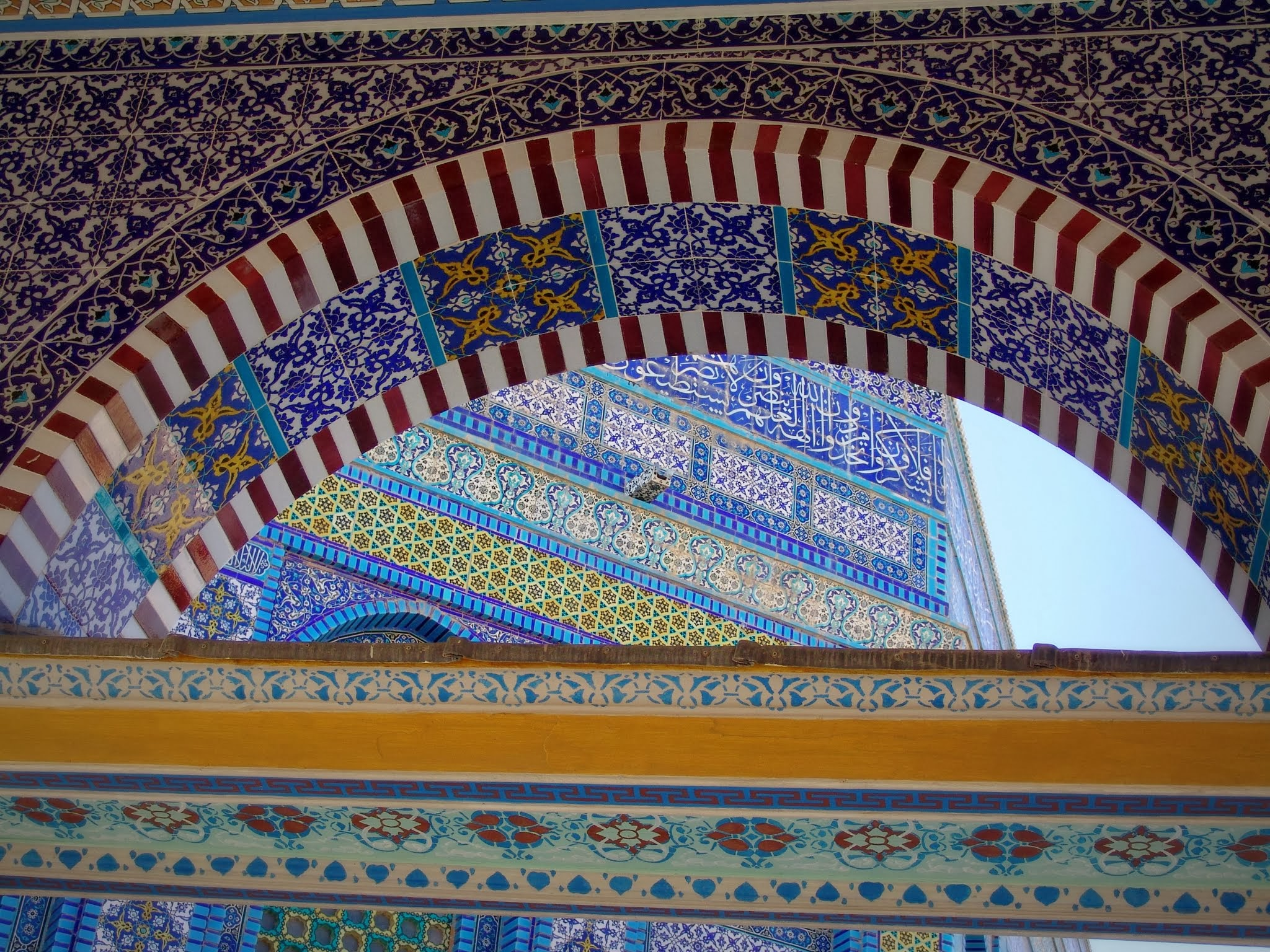
Dome of the Chain with Dome of the Rock detail behind

== See also ==
- Early medieval domes

Also in the compound:

- Dome of the Ascension
- Dome of the Prophet
- Dome of the Rock
- Chain Gate

Others:

- "Tower of David", the citadel of Jerusalem, associated with the Koranic Miḥrāb Dāʾūd, David's upper room or prayer place

== Bibliography ==
- Archnet. "Qubba al-Silsila".
- Official guide (2015). "The Dome of the Chain (no. 9)" (PDF). A Guide to Al-Aqsa Mosque (Al-Haram Ash-Sharif). The Hashemite Fund for the Building and Maintenance of the Blessed Aqsa Mosque and the Noble Dome of the Rock, Amman; Department of Awqaf and Islamic Affairs, Jerusalem; Palestinian Academic Society for the Study of International Affairs (PASSIA), Jerusalem. p. 24.
- Grabar, O. (15 May 2017), "The Umayyad Dome of the Rock in Jerusalem", Early Islamic Art and Architecture, Routledge, p. 39, doi:10.4324/9781315257280-10, ISBN 978-1-315-25728-0
- Mostafa, Heba (8 October 2017). "From the Dome of the Chain to Miḥrāb Dāʾūd: The Transformation of an Umayyad Commemorative Site at the Haram al-Sharif in Jerusalem". Muqarnas Online. 34 (1): 1–22. doi:10.1163/22118993_03401p002. ISSN 0732-2992. JSTOR 26551692.
- Murphy-O'Connor, Jerome (2008). "Dome of the Chain". The Holy Land: An Oxford Archaeological Guide from Earliest Times to 1700. Oxford University Press. p. 97. ISBN 978-0-19-923666-4.
- Pringle, D. (2007). "Chapel of St James the Less (Qubbat as-Silsila) (No. 319)". The Churches of the Crusader Kingdom of Jerusalem: A Corpus. Vol. 3: The City of Jerusalem. Cambridge University Press. pp. 182–185. ISBN 978-0-521-39038-5.
- Rosen-Ayalon, Myriam (1989). "The Early Islamic Monuments of al-Ḥaram Al-Sharīf: An Iconographic Study". Qedem. 28: 25–29. ISSN 0333-5844. JSTOR 43588798.
- Tillier, Mathieu (2018), "'Abd al-Malik, Muḥammad et le Jugement dernier: le dôme du Rocher comme expression d'une orthodoxie islamique", Les vivants et les morts dans les sociétés médiévales (in French), Éditions de la Sorbonne, pp. 341–365, doi:10.4000/books.psorbonne.53878, ISBN 979-1-03-510092-6
