= Santa María de Melque =

Coordinates: 39°45′03″N 4°22′23″W

Santa María de Melque is a church located near the town of San Martín de Montalbán in the province of Toledo in Spain. Included in the Monastic Complex of Melque, it is considered "the best preserved exponent of the constructions and establishment of religious complexes in the early 8th century in the region of Toledo". The church is the biggest fully-vaulted early medieval church still standing in Western Europe.

Following its acquisition by the Toledo Provincial Council, the complex was excavated and restored. An interpretation centre is available.

== History ==
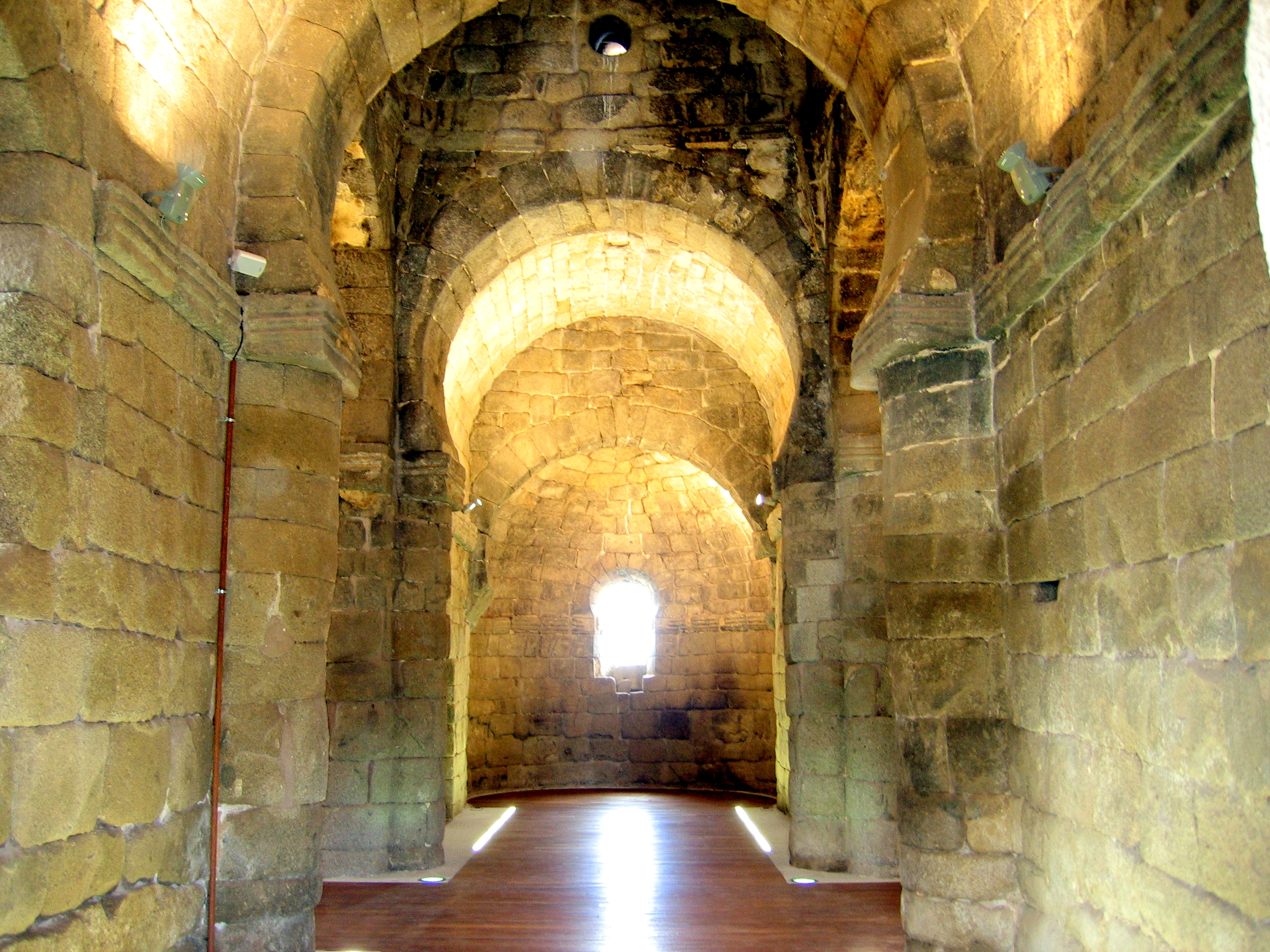
A view of the interior of the church

The site was originally a Roman settlement, with five dams across the two brooks that surround a small, rocky hill. Santa María de Melque began as a monastic collection inside the Catholic Kingdom of Toledo. Construction commenced in the 7th century, coinciding with the end of the Visigothic kingdom. The arrival of the Arabs may have stopped construction, although the architecture also shows Syrian influence (specifically Syro-Umayyad). It appears that an Islamic settlement was present in the 8th century.

With the conquest of Toledo by King Alfonso VI of León and Castile in 1085, the temple recovered its liturgical function while retaining its military function. The anthropomorphic tombs located to the east and the remains of barbicans are testimonies to this historic period.

Worship at the site ceased in the 19th century following its "confiscation" as part of the secularisation of religious sites at the time.

== Architecture ==
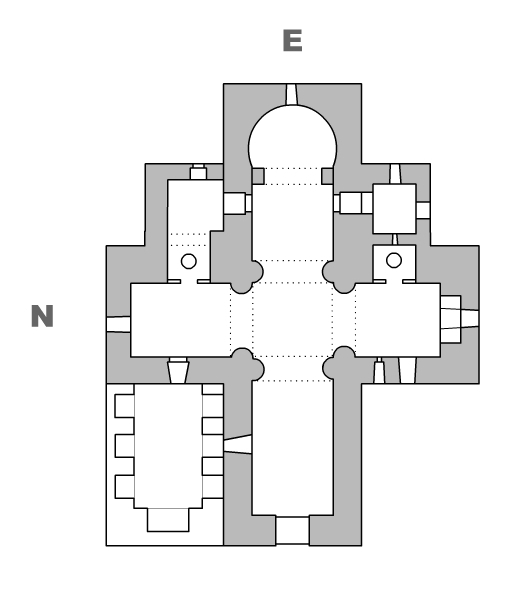
Plan of the church

Completed in the 8th century, the church is the first one-half of a better preserved monument of the Spanish High Middle Ages. Its construction technique is an inheritance of late Roman architecture. However, the lack of decorative elements preserved (filigrees of stucco in the transverse arches of the crossing) that still can be seen in the background of the southern arm of the crossing suggests that Melque could have begun as a mausoleum, destined to host a distinguished personage from Toledo's Visigothic Kingdom. The church was redesigned on at least two occasions.

The Knights Templar turned the church into a defensive tower, referred to by Romans as a turris. This tower over the dome base was recently dismounted. It had a porch with three openings that no longer exists.

The plan is cruciform, with a central apse; two lateral apses were added later. It keeps in good condition its different naves, some side chapels and a parlor with pronounced horseshoe arches.

The presbytery corresponds to a monastic community with round arches at both sides. A moorish tower is also preserved over the vault.

This church has contributions of clearly Visigothic style, solutions contributed by the Mozarabs, and memories of the Roman style:

- Visigothic contributions: the horseshoe arch that supports the apse's vault, surpassing 1/3 of the radium. The set of remains sculptured, of Visigothic tradition. The arcosolium.
- Mozarabic contributions: central horseshoe arches surpassing 1/2 of the radium. Arches of the windows in 2/3. Strange semicircular pilasters of the inside that may be considered semi-detached.
- Innovations: the circular reduction of the corners in its 4 facades and the vertical crack at both sides, having the appearance of pseudo columns. It looks like the columns placed at the corners of the lantern towers of Romanesque Norman style in unprecedented fashion.

== See also ==
- Early medieval domes
