= Basilica of Saint Mary of the Arches =

Coordinates: 42.4029°N 2.7108°W

- Basílica de Santa María de Arcos (Spanish)
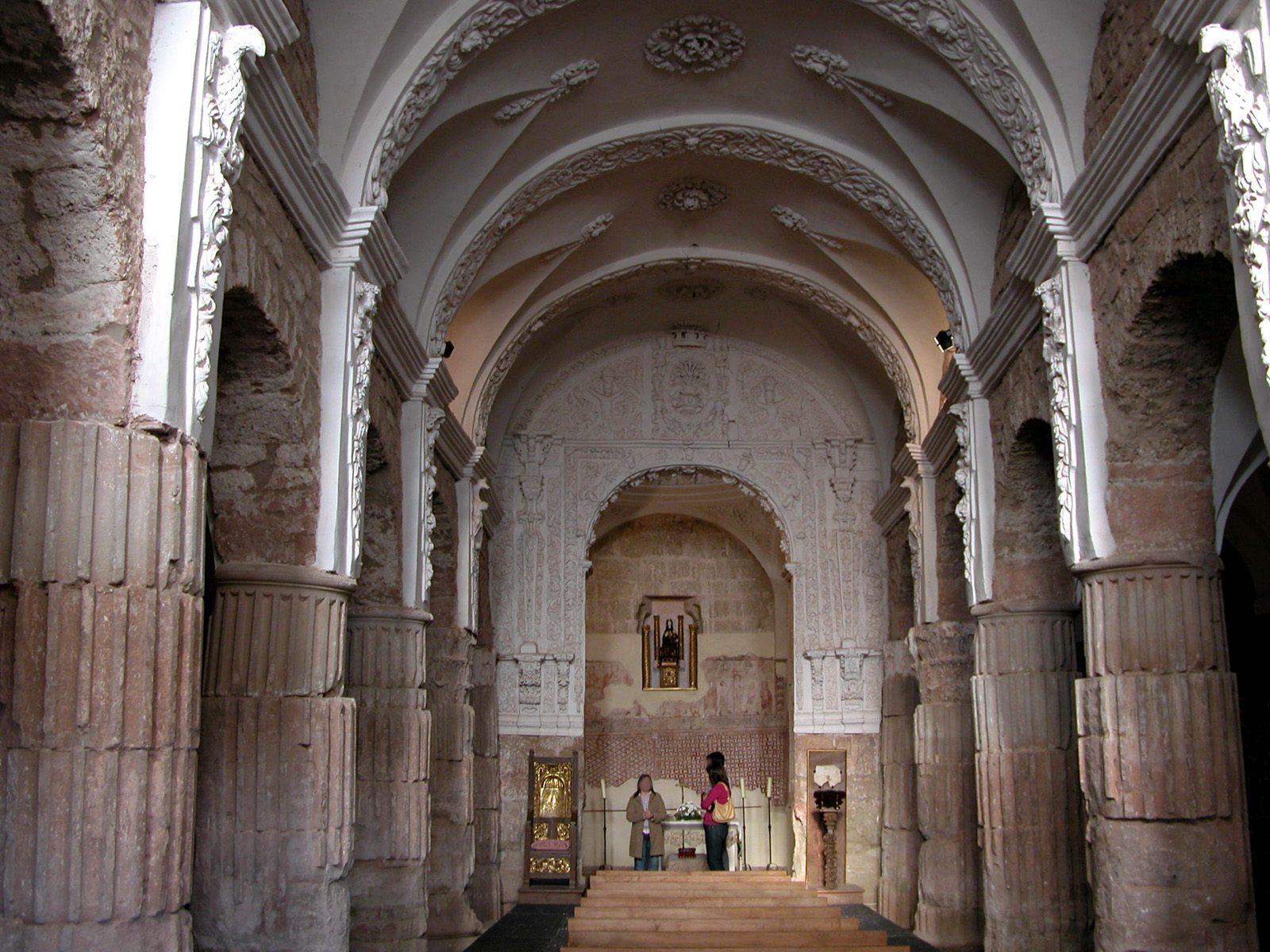
- Interactive map of Basilica of Saint Mary of the Arches
- Location: Tricio, (La Rioja)

The Basilica of Saint Mary of the Arches, Spanish: Basílica de Santa María de Arcos, is a paleochristian temple, which dates back to the 5th century, located on the outskirts of Tricio, in La Rioja (Spain). Other historians like Caballero, Arce and Utrero propose the hypothesis that it was built during the Reconquista in the 9th or 10th century based on technical and historical considerations.

It was built over a Roman mausoleum of the 3rd century, reusing a number of pieces of this and other buildings of the ancient Roman city of Tritium Megalon.

== See also ==
- Early medieval domes
