= Early medieval domes =

Domes in religious architecture in the Early Middle Ages

The domes of the Early Middle Ages (c. 500-1000) built by Arab Muslim and Western European Christian states, particularly in those areas recently under Byzantine control, were an extension of earlier Roman architecture. The early Islamic domes in the Syrian region as well as the Mausoleum of Theodoric in Italy are believed to have benefited from the work of Syrian craftsmen. The Dome of the Rock, an Umayyad Muslim religious shrine built in Jerusalem, was designed similarly to nearby Byzantine martyria and Christian churches. Domes were also built as part of Muslim palaces, throne halls, pavilions, and baths, and blended elements of both Byzantine and Persian architecture, using both pendentives and squinches. Domes were included as part of Muslim palaces prior to their use in mosques, where early domes were likely used to mark the place of the ruler during ceremonies.

In the Christian West, the influence of Byzantine architecture diminishes under Charlemagne, although his Palatine Chapel is a notable exception, being influenced by Byzantine models from Ravenna and Constantinople. It was used as a throne hall and mausoleum, and the octagonal dome would be very influential in the architecture of the successor states to the Carolingian Empire, inspiring copies into the 14th century. Circular churches in central Europe were usually royal chapels.

The Islamic architecture of al-Andalus included the earliest known example of the crossed-arch dome type in the Great Mosque of Córdoba, which was famous in the Islamic world, and it may have spread the type. In Egypt, a "keel" shaped dome profile was characteristic of Fatimid architecture. Fatimid palace architecture has not survived, but Fatimid mausoleums were mostly simple square buildings covered by a smooth or ribbed dome, with some urban examples including carved stucco decoration. The use of squinches became widespread in the Islamic world by the tenth and eleventh centuries.

== Ostrogothic Kingdom ==
Although the chronology is uncertain for some examples, domes continued to be built in Italy throughout the Middle Ages. Dome construction appears to have stopped within the city of Rome in the middle of the 5th century, but there are dozens of Italian examples outside of Rome from the next few centuries. Continuing from late antiquity, domes in the early Middle Ages were built over centralized buildings such as baptisteries and martyria. The Albenga Baptistery was built as early as the mid-5th century in Italy.

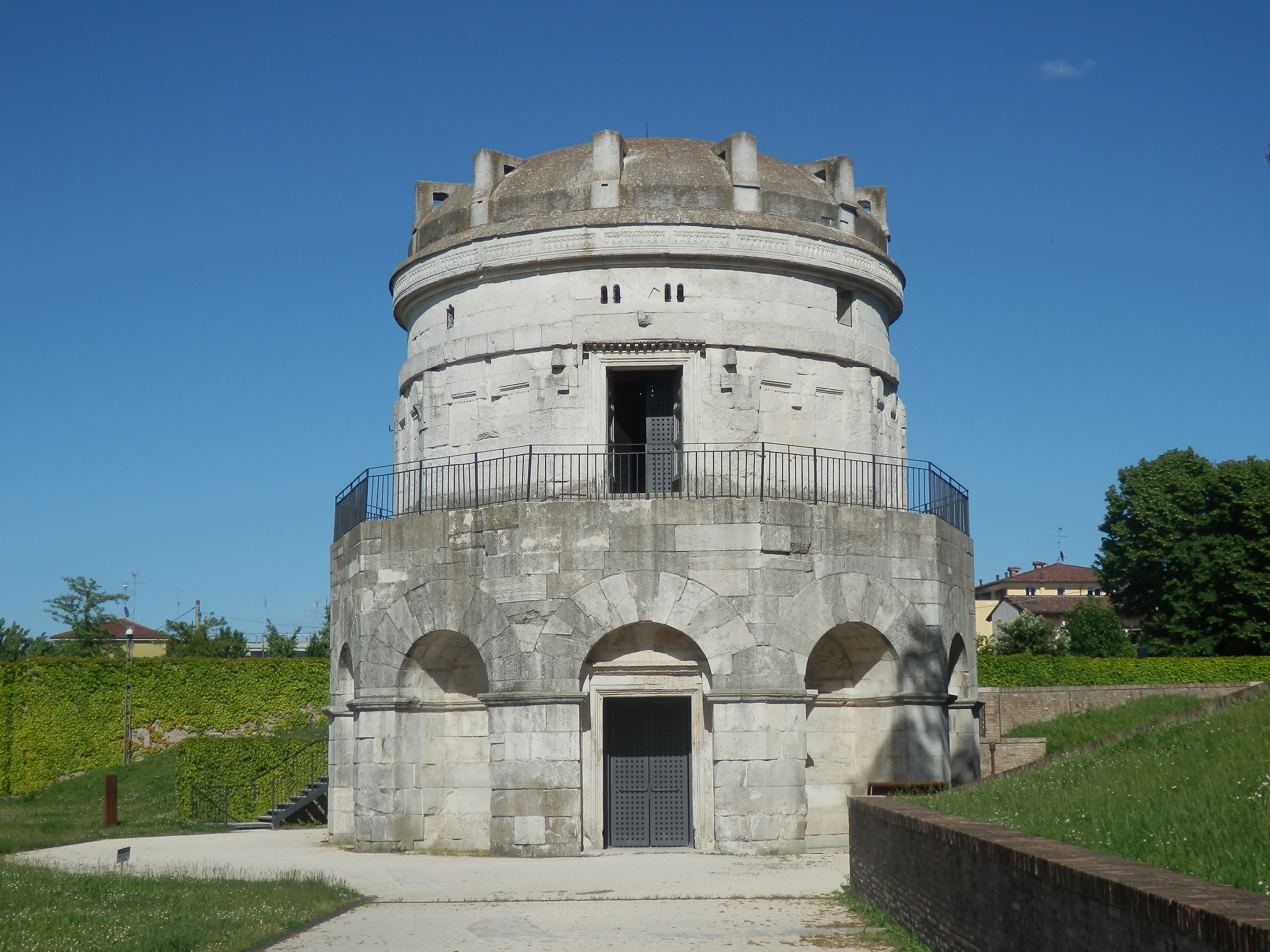
The Mausoleum of Theodoric.

The building projects of Theodoric the Great, the Ostrogothic king of Italy, largely continued existing architectural conventions. His Arian Baptistry in Ravenna (c. 500), for example, closely echoes the Baptistry of Neon built before it. The Mausoleum of Theodoric, however, was understood by contemporaries to be remarkable. Begun in 520, the 36-foot-wide (11 m) dome over the mausoleum was carved out of a single 440-ton slab of limestone and positioned some time between 522 and 526. The low saucer shape of the monolithic dome, which is estimated to be more than 230 tons of Istrian stone, may have been chosen to avoid radial cracking. The twelve brackets carved as part of the dome's exterior are thought to have been used to maneuver the piece into place. The choice of large limestone blocks for the structure is significant as the most common construction material in the West at that time was brick. It is likely that foreign artisans were brought to Ravenna to build the structure; possibly from Syria, where such stonework was used in contemporary buildings.

== Kingdom of the Lombards ==
=== Duchy of Benevento ===
The church of Sant'Ilario a Port'Aurea in Benevento was built no later than the 7th century.

== Rashidun Caliphate ==
The Syria and Palestine area has a long tradition of domical architecture, including wooden domes in shapes described as "conoid", or similar to pine cones. When the Arab Muslim forces conquered the region, they employed local craftsmen for their buildings and, by the end of the 7th century, the dome had begun to become an architectural symbol of Islam. The rapidity of this adoption was likely aided by the Arab religious traditions, which predate Islam, of both domed structures to cover the burial places of ancestors and the use of a round tabernacle tent with a dome-like top made of red leather for housing idols.

== Visigothic Kingdom ==
The Chapel of São Frutuoso, near Braga, Portugal, has a wide range of proposed construction dates, from the 7th century to the beginning of the 11th century. It was a Greek cross plan mausoleum with a central dome, similar to the Byzantine Mausoleum of Galla Placidia and the Visigothic churches of Santa Comba de Bande and San Pedro de la Nave. The building was restored in the 1930s and the current dome dates to that period, but there are remains of brick pendentives indicating that the original central space was covered by a domical vault of some kind.

The church of Santa María de Melque included a dome within a square structure. Proposed dates for the church have ranged from the 7th to the 10th century, with an 8th-century date indicated by thermoluminescence testing.

== Umayyad Caliphate ==
Umayyad architecture blended elements of multiple traditions, and this is evident in its dome structures. Early versions of bulbous domes can be seen in mosaic illustrations in Syria dating to the Umayyad period.

A domed Umayyad throne hall at Kufa was built on the Sassanian model.

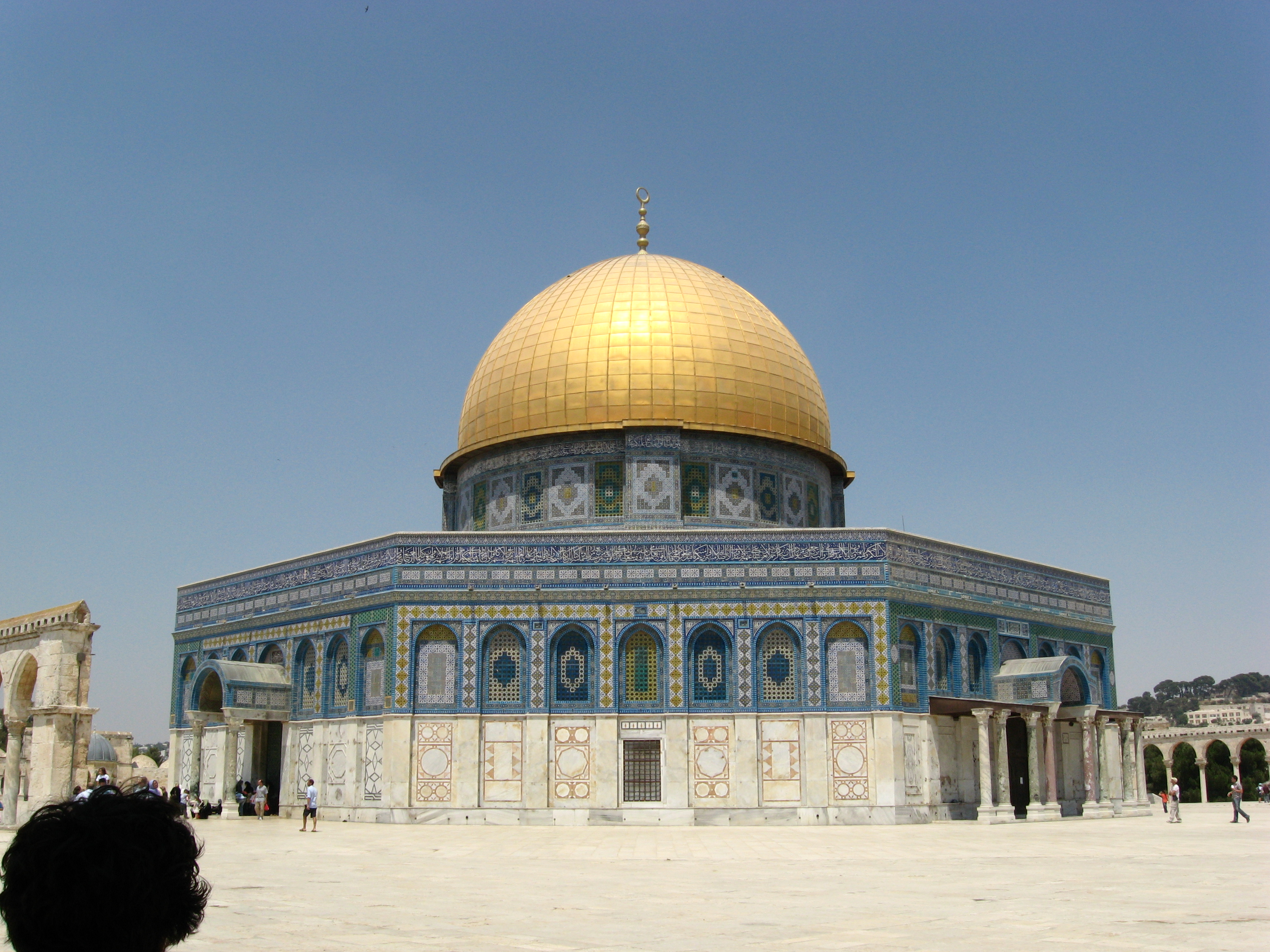
The Dome of the Rock in Jerusalem

The Dome of the Rock in Jerusalem, the earliest surviving Islamic building, was completed in 691 by Umayyad caliph Abd Al-Malik. Its design was that of a ciborium, or reliquary, such as those common to Byzantine martyria and the major Christian churches of the city. The rotunda of the nearby Church of the Holy Sepulchre, in particular, has a similar design and almost the same dimensions. The building was reportedly burned in the eleventh century and then rebuilt, which would still make it one of the oldest timber buildings in the world. The dome, a double shell design made of wood, is 20.44 meters in diameter. The dome's bulbous shape "probably dates from the eleventh century." Several restorations since 1958 to address structural damage have resulted in the extensive replacement of tiles, mosaics, ceilings, and walls such that "nearly everything that one sees in this marvelous building was put there in the second half of the twentieth century", but without significant change to its original form and structure. It is currently covered in gilded aluminum. On the same terrace are the Dome of the Chain (also from the reign of Abd Al-Malik), the Dome of the Ascension (built by 985 AD), and the Dome of the Spirits (possibly the 16th century AD).

Byzantine workmen built the Umayyad Mosque of Damascus and its hemispherical dome for al Walid in 705. The dome rests upon an octagonal base formed by squinches. The dome, called the "Dome of the Eagle" or "Dome of the Gable", was originally made of wood but nothing remains of it. It is supposed to have rested upon large cross beams.

The placement of a dome in front of the mihrab of a mosque probably began with the rebuilding of the Prophet's Mosque in Medina by Umayyad Caliph Al-Walid. This was likely to emphasize the place of the ruler, although domes would eventually become focal points of decoration and architectural composition or indicate the direction of prayer. Later developments of this feature would include additional domes oriented axially to the mihrab dome.

In addition to religious shrines, domes were used over the audience and throne halls of Umayyad palaces, and as part of porches, pavilions, fountains, towers and the calderia of baths. Blending the architectural features of both the Byzantine and Persian architecture, the domes used both pendentives and squinches and were made in a variety of shapes and materials. Muslim palaces included domical halls as early as the eighth century, well before domes became standard elements of mosque architecture.

The early eighth-century palace of Khirbat al-Minya included a domed gateway.

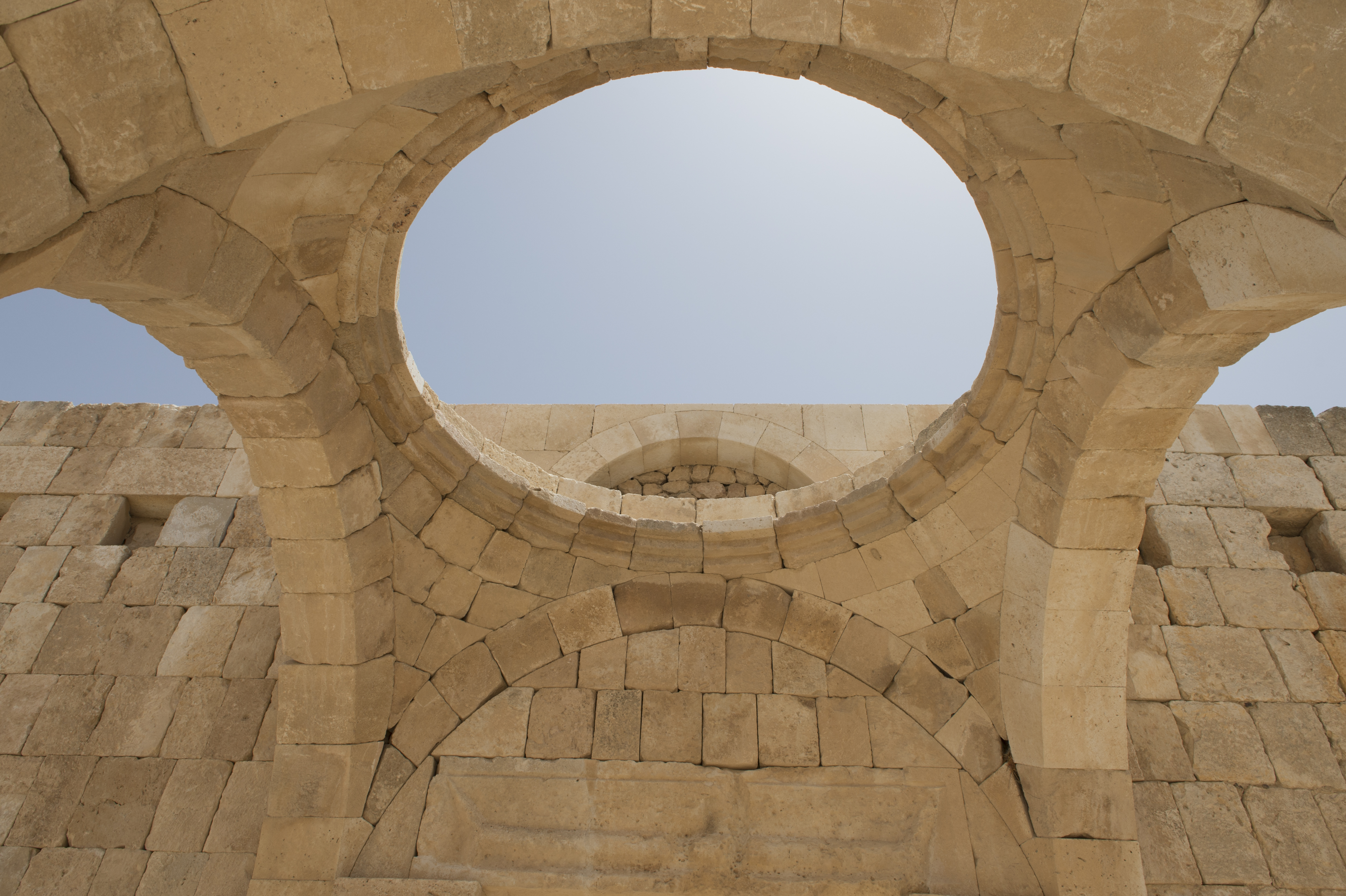
The remains of a dome on pendentives at Qasr al-Hallabat

At Qasr al-Hallabat, the remains of a dome on pendentives show the curves of the pendentives and the supporting arches were carved from the same arch voussoir blocks. Pendentives were normally distinct from and built after their supporting arches.

Although earlier palaces had domes over throne rooms or housed gates in domed structures, the Amman palace is the first to have both. Domes over the entrance to the palace and over the throne room marked the two poles of the complex. The dome over the throne room was supported by "lintelled squinches", a unique example of horizontal stone elements imitating the Partho-Sassanian technique of placing timber beams diagonally over the corners of a square space, creating a smaller square rotated by 45 degrees which would have additional beams over its corners, so that a series of squares were formed in the ceiling inscribed within each other with 45 degree rotations.

The palace of Qasr Mshatta included a domed throne room. At Mshatta, "an elaborate entrance leads through a basilical hall to a domed triconch hall with an arcuated niche, presumably holding the caliphal throne, at the far end." This axial sequence of gateway, dome, and arcuated niche is found in early Islamic palaces into the Abbasid era, and the similar sequence of gateway, dome, and mihrab endured even longer in mosque architecture.

A domed structure covered a shallow pool in the main courtyard of the mid-eighth-century palace of Khirbat al-Mafjar. Similar examples at mosques, such as the domed fountains at the Mosque of Ibn Tulun (destroyed in 987 and replaced with a different structure), at Maarrat al-Numan, in Nishapur, Tripoli, and at the Mosque of Damascus seem to be related to this element of palace architecture, although they were later used as part of ritual ablution. The palace dome was supported by terracotta figures where the pendentives or squinches would have been. The dome was over the porch of a great bath or throne room at the bath complex. The Mafjar bathhouse also had unusual pendentives shaped from a shallow dome and four inclined parabolic arches.

The calderia of early Islamic bath complexes at Amra, Sarraj, and Anjar were roofed with stone or brick domes. The caldarium of the early Islamic bath at Qasr Amra contains "the most completely preserved astronomical cupola decoration", a decorative idea for bath domes that would long continue in the Islamic world. Traces of mosaic decoration have been found on a dome on pendentives at Qusayr 'Amra.

Architecture in the region would decline following the movement of the capital to Iraq under the Abbasids in 750.

== Carolingian Empire ==
In Italy, there seems to have been a decline in the frequency of dome building between the 8th and 10th centuries. With the crowning of Charlemagne as a new Roman Emperor, Byzantine influences were largely replaced in a revival of earlier Western building traditions, but occasional exceptions include examples of early quincunx churches at Milan and near Cassino. The extensive Byzantine use of domes on spherical pendentives after the sixth century did influence Carolingian architecture of the ninth and tenth centuries. Remains of spherical pendentives have been found in the church of Germigny-des-Prés.

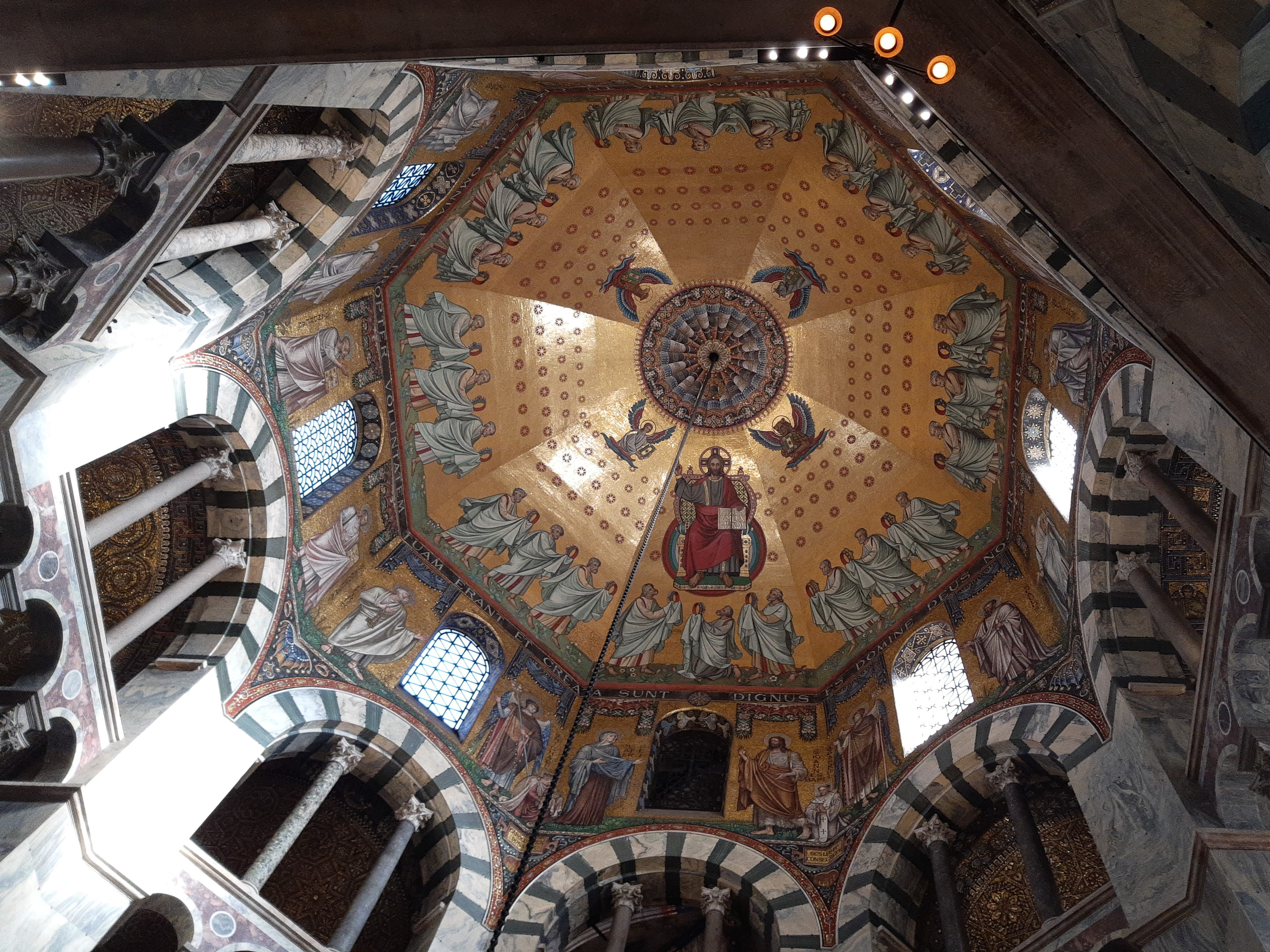
The Palatine Chapel in Aachen.

Charlemagne's Palatine Chapel was built at his palace at Aachen between 789 and its consecration in 805. The architect is thought to be Odo of Metz, although the quality of the ashlar construction has led to speculation about the work of outside masons. The building contained the imperial relics and expressed Charlemagne's effort toward renovatio imperii. The Palatine Chapel has a domed octagon design influenced by Byzantine models such as the Basilica of San Vitale in Ravenna, the Church of Sergius and Bacchus in Constantinople, and perhaps the Chrysotriklinos, or "golden reception hall", of the Great Palace of Constantinople. It has also been proposed that descriptions by returning travelers of the Dome of the Rock in Jerusalem, which was thought to have been the Temple of Solomon, served as the model. The dimensions of the octagonal space match that of the 4th-century octagonal Chapel of Saint Aquilino at the Basilica of San Lorenzo in Milan. The octagonal domical vault measures 16.5 meters wide (50 Carolingian feet) and 38 meters high. It was the largest dome north of the Alps at that time. The chapel served as the burial place for Charlemagne and the coronation site for Holy Roman Emperors and German Kings until 1531. It is the best preserved Carolingian building. It is also the most imitated, with polygonal plans distinguishing copies of the Palatine Chapel from circular-plan copies of the Church of the Holy Sepulchre. The chapel inspired copies into the 14th century and remained a "focal-point of German kingship". The dome was rebuilt after a fire in 1656 and the interior decoration dates to around 1900. Although the mosaic on the dome is not original, there is evidence that it reproduces the original imagery.

The Basilica of San Salvatore in Spoleto was built as early as the end of the 6th century. Excavations of the foundations suggest that the original square presbytery supported a low central tower and a timber roof. The current presbytery has flat triangular pendentives supporting an octagonal dome. First mentioned in a document from 815, the current structure has been proposed to date to the late 8th century, under the Carolingian Duchy of Spoleto.

The central-plan cemetery church of St. Michael at Fulda was similar to the Aachen chapel, although simpler.

The octagonal crossing of Ferrières Abbey (late 1100s - early 1200s) may be a result of building on the foundations of a 9th-century copy of the chapel at Aachen built under Aldric of Le Mans.

The original building at the site of the Saint Nikolaus Chapel in Nijmegen may have been early Carolingian, although the current building is a reconstruction from the 11th century.

The Marienkirche in Würzburg was believed to be a Carolingian building.

== Abbasid Caliphate ==
There are literary accounts of a domed audience hall in the palace of Abu Muslim in Merv at the meeting point of four iwans arranged along the cardinal directions, similar to the larger dome that stood at the center of the palace-city of Baghdad.

The green dome at the center of the Round city of Baghdad covered the throne room of al-Mansur's palace and was topped by a statue of a horseman holding a lance. The gates to the city, over a kilometer away from the throne room dome, or Qubat al-Jadra, were also topped by domes. The central dome collapsed in 941, well after the Caliph had moved his court to a suburban estate.

Although customarily a qadi would hear cases within the chief mosque, Abbasid Caliph al-Muhtadi reportedly built a domed hall with four doors for his role in administering justice. It was called the qubbat al-mazalim, or "The Dome of Justice", and built in 868–869.

A ninth-century palace at Samarra included a domed throne room.

A small nine-domed mosque in Balkh has been dated to the time of the Abbasids or Biyuds. The domed Samanid Mauseloum is regarded as one of the oldest surviving funerary buildings in Central Asian architecture. Dating to the 10th century, it was constructed during the Samanid dynasty, under the nominal suzerainty of the Abbasid Caliphate.

=== Aghlabid dynasty ===
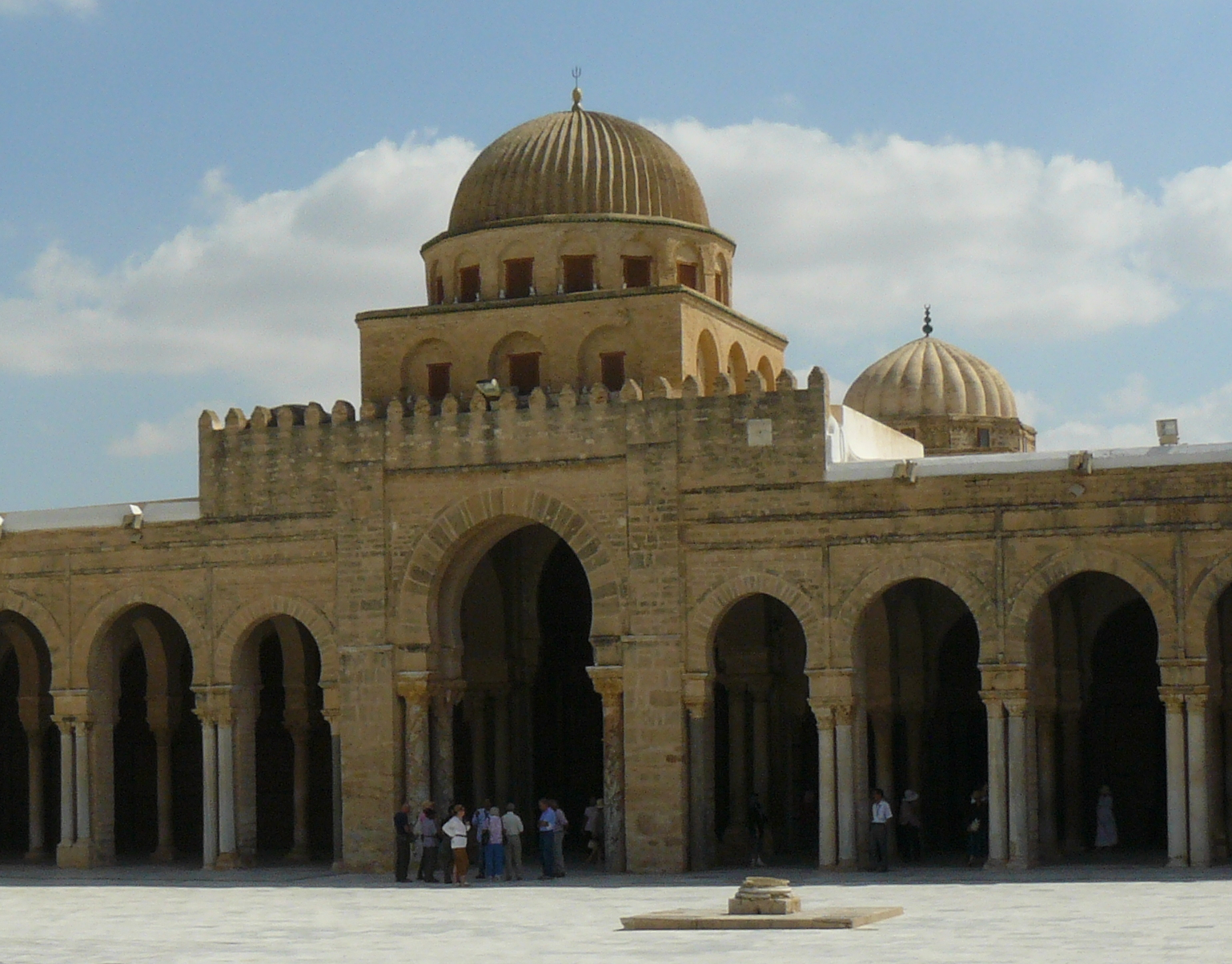
Domes of the Great Mosque of Kairouan

The dome of the Great Mosque of Kairouan (also called the Mosque of Uqba), built in the first half of the 9th century, has ribbed domes at each end of its central nave. The dome in front of the mihrab rests on an octagonal drum with slightly concave sides. The mihrab dome was built in 836 by Ziyadat Allah. The dome over the gate, Bab al-Bahu, was built by Abu Ibrahim Ahmad in 862. This dome model would be reproduced widely in western Islamic architecture. The second dome of Al-Zaytuna Mosque, over the Bab al-Bahu was inspired by the Kairouan mosque.

The Great Mosque of Sfax in Tunisia was founded in the 9th century and later enlarged.

Conical squinches, often decorated as shells, were frequently used in Tunisia in the 10th and 11th centuries. Conical squinches were unusual for Islamic domes but common in Christian Romanesque domes.

=== Ikhshidid dynasty ===
In Cairo, the martyrium of the Sharif Tabataba (943), an 18-meter square nine-domed open pavilion, is the earliest mausoleum whose plan has survived. The most common type, however, was a small domed cube. The use of corner squinches to support domes was widespread in Islamic architecture by the 10th and 11th centuries.

== Successor states to the Carolingian Empire ==
=== Kingdom of Italy ===
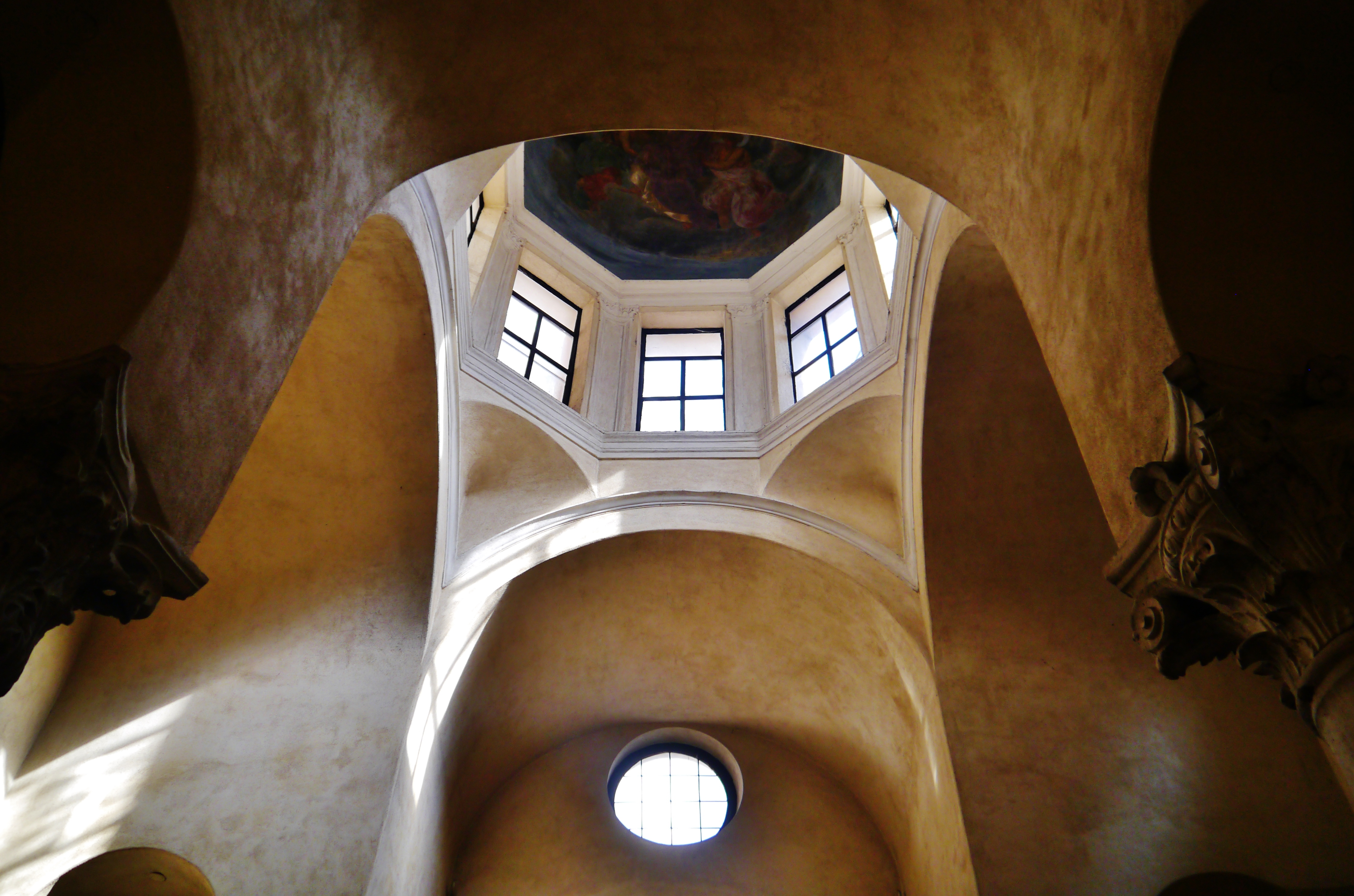
The chapel of S. Satiro in Milan

Octagonal cloister vaults in northern Italy at this time may have been meant to reference the Palatine Chapel in Aachen. Examples include the chapel of S. Satiro in Milan from 876 (behind the later church of Santa Maria presso San Satiro), the baptistery at the church of Settimo Vittone (889), and the baptistery of Agliate (c. 900).

=== East Francia ===
A large decagonal chapel with a twenty-sided ambulatory was built in Groningen in the early 10th century.

=== West Francia ===
In 1955, the foundations of an octagonal chapel with a sixteen-sided enclosure wall were unearthed under the Church of Our Lady in Bruges. The date of the structure is uncertain, and ranges from the mid-9th century to the first half of the 10th century. Based on its layout and medieval descriptions, it may have been the closest copy of the Palatine Chapel at Aachen.

=== Holy Roman Empire ===
The baptistery of Lomello included a dome topped with an turret unconnected to the space below.

The Collegiate Church of St John the Evangelist in Liège (late 10th century) was built by Bishop Notker of Liège, possibly as his burial place. It was rebuilt from 1754 to 1757, but earlier documentation indicates that the reconstruction was faithful to the original building. It has an octagonal central space and 16-sided ambulatory. The building has a diameter of about 27 metres (90 ft). An octagonal chapel from the late 10th century at Muizen, near Mechelen, about half the size of the chapel at Liège, was also under the authority of Bishop Notker and may have been built in imitation of the Liège church. The central space may have been covered by a timber ceiling.

The Old Tower of Mettlach (987-993) at Mettlach, likely a tomb, was compared to the Aachen chapel as early as the 11th century, but may have had other inspirations. The central polygonal space spans 15 metres (50 ft), but was initially covered with a timber roof, rather than a stone dome. The Old Tower of Mettlach was in the tradition of Roman centralized lobed buildings, as were the lobed rotunda in Altötting and Brenov.

Circular churches in Central Europe at the end of the 10th and into the 11th century were "main princely or royal private chapels, showing in a very much simplified manner the distant influence of Charlemagne's palace chapel at Aix-la-Chapelle. However, after the end of the eleventh century, this connection tended to become obscured." After the 11th century, many were used as small provincial parish churches.

St. Peter's Collegiate Church in Bad Wimpfen (late 10th century or mid-11th century) was built with a hexagonal core and dodecagonal ambulatory that also included a tri-apse east end.

== Kingdom of Asturias and Kingdom of León ==
Mozarabic churches with domes inside a squared structure include a church in San Cebrian de Mazote (913), Santiago de Peñalba (931), Santo Tomás de las Ollas (first half of the 10th century), and San Miguel de Celanova (10th century). The churches of Santiago de Peñalba and San Salvador de Palat del Rey have umbrella domes from the reign of Ramiro II, who was buried at San Salvador de Palat del Rey.

A group of churches around Burgos, La Rioja, and Álava have domes on pendentives dated to the early ninth or mid-tenth centuries and may have been inspired by earlier León churches: Nuestra Señora de la Asunción de San Vicente del Valle, San Felices de Oca, San Pedro de Arlanza, Santa Cecilia de Barriosuso, Quintanilla de las Viñas, Santa María de los Arcos, Santa Coloma, Santa María de Ventas Blancas, and San Román de Tobillas in Álava.

== Umayyads of Córdoba ==
Much of the Muslim architecture of al-Andalus was lost as mosques were replaced by churches after the twelfth century, but the use of domes in surviving Mozarabic churches from the tenth century, such as the paneled dome at Santo Tomás de las Ollas and the lobed domes at the Monastery of San Miguel de Escalada, likely reflects their use in contemporary mosque architecture.

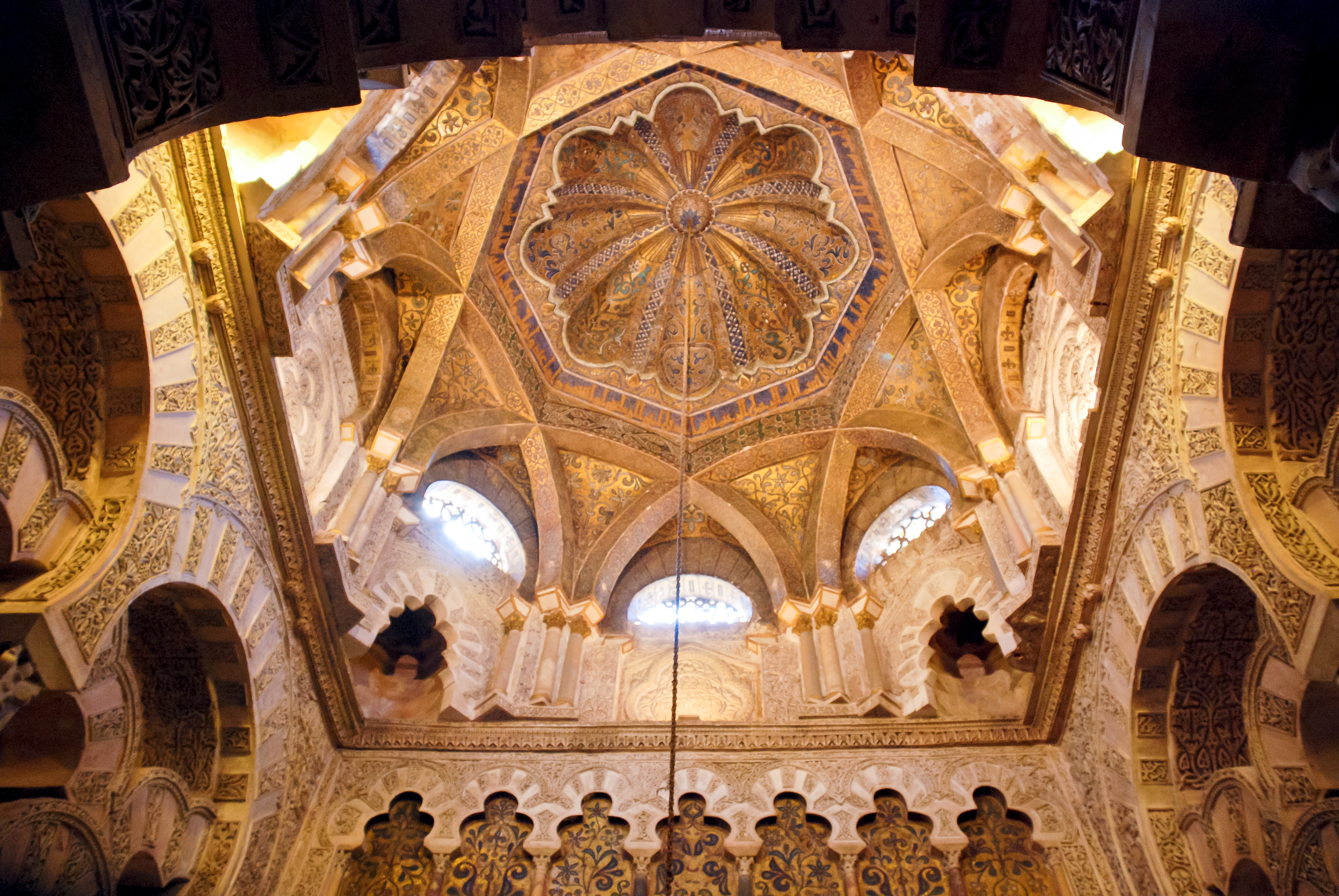
The Great Mosque of Córdoba.

The Great Mosque of Córdoba, begun in 785 under the last of the Umayyad caliphs, was enlarged by Al-Hakam II between 961 and 976 to include four domes and a remodeled mihrab. The central dome, in front of the mihrab area, transitions from a square bay with decorative squinches to eight overlapping and intersecting arches that surround and support a scalloped dome. The building contained two types of eight-pointed star ribbed domes. The different ribbed dome over what is now called the Villaviciosa Chapel may have been built later. All four were crossed-arch vaults and the Villaviciosa example may be the first built, in front of the older mihrab of Abd ar-Rahman II. Two of the other three use an identical pattern and flank the third, which is in front of the newer mihrab of Al-Hakam II. The type spread through Spain and North Africa in the 11th to 13th centuries. These crossed-arch domes are the first known examples of the type and, although their possible origins in Persia or elsewhere in the east remains a matter of debate, their complexity suggests that earlier examples must have existed. After the 10th century, examples can also be found in Armenia and Persia. The examples in Armenia have been dated after 1200 and may be explained by Armenian masons traveling back from West. About 40 examples, the most of any country, are known in Spain. They are found in "towers, kitchens, chapels and secondary spaces of castles, churches or mosques". The Great Mosque of Córdoba was famous in the Islamic world and transmission of this dome type may have occurred from Cordoba to the east through North Africa and the Mediterranean.

== Fatimid Caliphate ==
The Fatimids conquered Egypt from Ifriqiya in 969 and established a new architectural style for their new Caliphate. Fatimid domes were either smooth or ribbed, hemispherical or stilted, and may or may not include a drum. When a drum was used, it was wider than the dome, octagonal, and part of a zone of transition. There were earlier Muslim domes in Eqypt, but none survive.

The earliest Fatimid mosque, Al-Azhar, was similar to the earlier Mosque of Ibn Tulun but introduced domed bays at both ends of the qibla wall, in addition to the dome in front of the mihrab, and this feature was later repeated among the mosques of North Africa. Later alterations to the mosque have changed its original form.

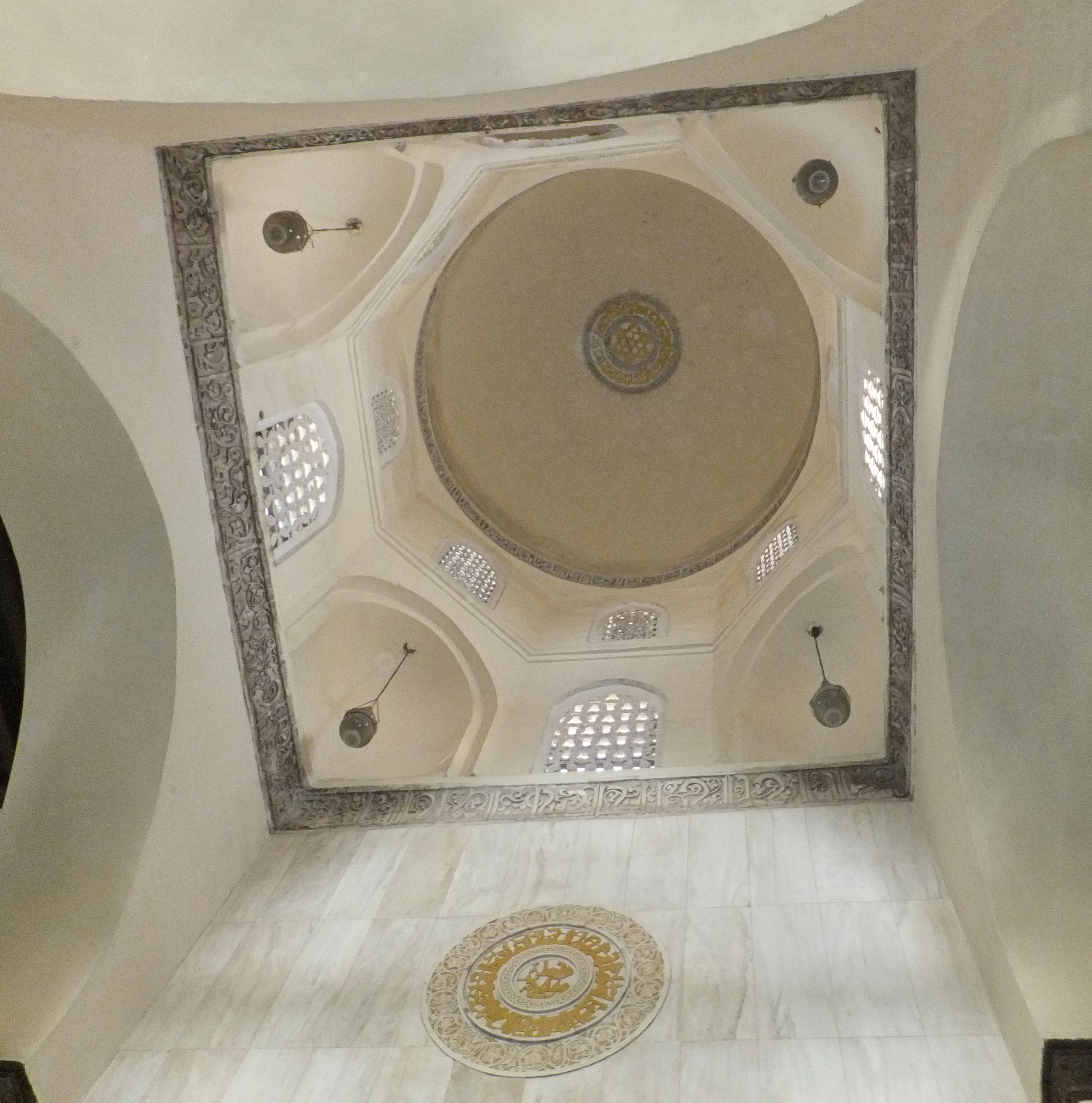
The dome over the mihrab at Al-Hakim Mosque

The earliest surviving Muslim dome over a mihrab in Egypt is that of Al-Hakim Mosque (990–1013) and the earliest mausoleum is the "Šaiḫ Yūnus" mausoleum, believed to have been built for Badr al-Jamali.

Earlier Coptic Christian domes primarily used squinches and only occasionally used pendentives, for example at Deir el-Muharraq, Dair Abū Fāna, and the narthex of Dair al-Abyad, but Fatimid domes used squinches exclusively. The squinches correspond to an exterior zone of transition, often stepped, when they are on top of the rectangular bay walls. Traditionally, Fatimid interior stalactite squinches were in one or two tiers and each interior tier would correspond to a step in the exterior transition zone. When the walls extended up past the squinches to the base of the dome, usually in Fatimid domes in Aswan and other areas outside of Cairo, no exterior zone of transition was needed. An example is the mausoleum of Al-imāra al-arabiyya in Aswan. Adding a tier of squinches made a dome taller, and Fatimid architecture begins a trend in Cairo toward ever taller buildings.

Egypt, along with north-eastern Iran, was one of two areas notable for early developments in Islamic mausoleums, beginning in the 10th century. Fatimid mausoleums, many of which have survived in Aswan and Cairo, were mostly simple square buildings covered by a dome. Domes were smooth or ribbed and had a characteristic Fatimid "keel" shape profile. The domes of the connected mausolea of Sayyida Atika and al-Gafari are examples. The first were built in and around Fustat. Those inside the city were decorated with carved stucco and contrast with the extreme simplicity of those outside the city, such as the four so-called Sab'a Banat (c. 1010) domed squares. Those at Aswan, mostly from the 11th century, are more developed, with ribbed domes, star-shaped openings, and octagonal drums with concave exterior sides which are corbeled outward at the top. They vary in plan as well, with domes sometimes joined with barrel vaults or with other domed mausoleums of different dimensions. The Fatimid mausoleum at Qus is in this Aswan style.

Other than the small brick domes used over the bay in front of a mihrab or over tombs, Fatimid domes were rare. An exception in size was the large dome over the Fatimid palace dynastic tomb. Literary sources describe royal domes as part of ceremonial processions and royal recreation. Examples of Fatimid palace architecture, however, described by travelers' accounts as their greatest achievement, have not survived. The ribbed or fluted domes introduced by the Fatimids may derive from a theme in earlier Coptic art, and would be continued in the later architecture of the Mamluks.

== County of Barcelona ==
The Church of Sant Miguel at Egara has a centralized plan and was believed to have been a baptistery or mausoleum. Its date is uncertain but it may have been built in the 960s or early 970s, despite the central dome on squinches (rather than pendentives) being unusual for the Iberian peninsula at this time. Restorations have been carried out since the 17th century and may have altered what were once horseshoe arches linking the columns beneath the dome.

== See also ==
- History of architecture
- Medieval technology
- Rib vault – Architectural feature to cover a wide space
- Pointed arch (architecture) – Arch with a pointed crown
