= Mashhad al-Tabataba =

Historic shrine in Cairo, Egypt

- Arabic: مشهد آل طباطبا
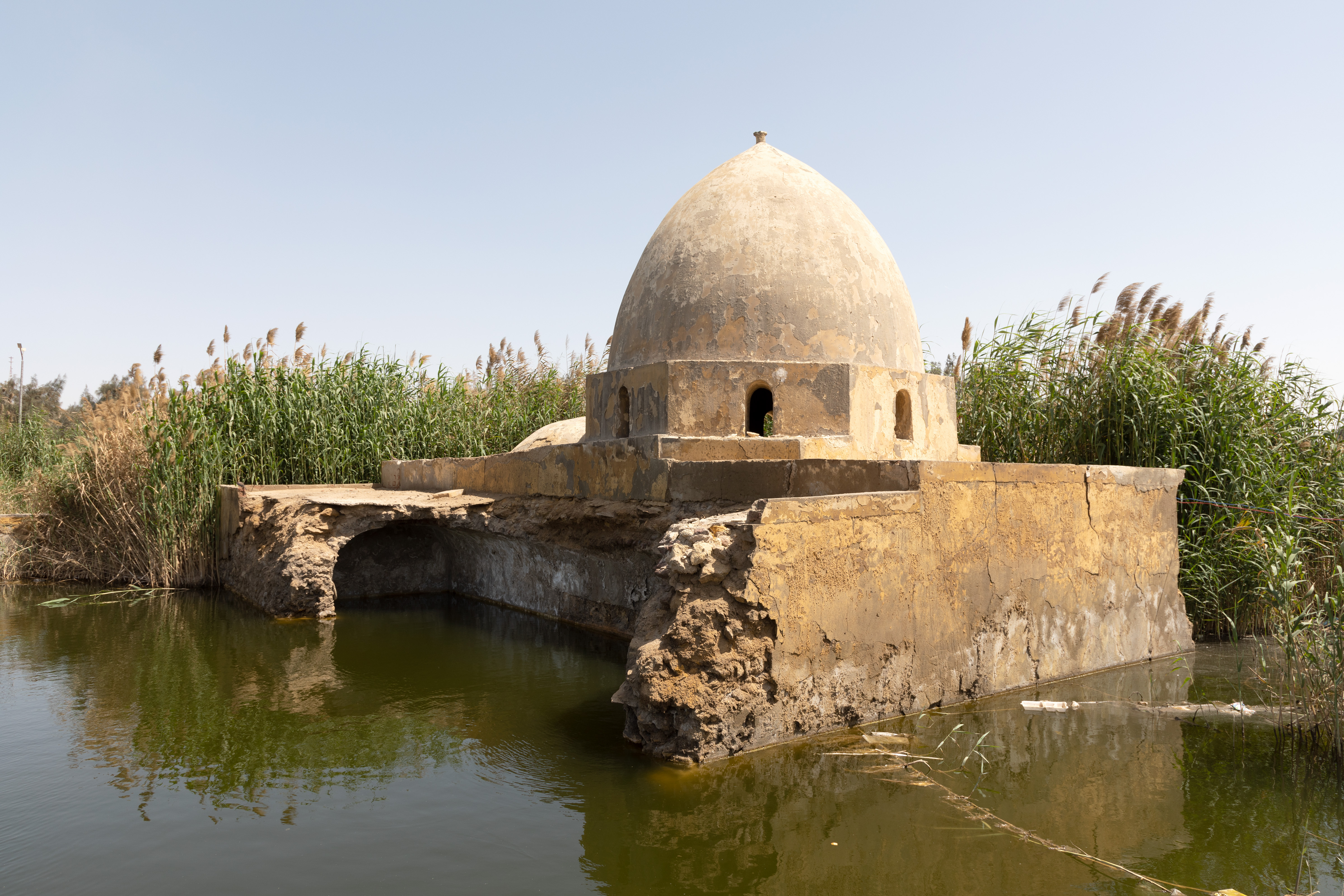
- The mausoleum before its relocation to the National Museum of Egyptian Civilization

- Location in Egypt

Religion
- Affiliation: Islam
- Status: Currently a part of the National Museum of Egyptian Civilization

Location
- Location: Cairo, Egypt
- Coordinates: 30.0098442°N 31.2491908°E

Architecture
- Established: 10th century
- Dome: 3 (formerly 9)

The Mashhad al-Tabataba (Arabic: مشهد آل طباطبا) also known as the Mashhad al-Sharif al-Tabataba is a 10th-century mausoleum located in Cairo, Egypt. It was formerly located on the banks of the Ain el-Sira River, until it was relocated to the territory of the National Museum of Egyptian Civilization as part of a restoration attempt. It is the last surviving monument from the Ikhshidid period.

== History ==
The mausoleum was constructed in the 10th century during the rule of the Ikhshidids. It was built by Muhammad ibn Tughj al-Ikhshid over the grave of Sharif Tabataba al-Asghar after his death in the year 945. Later on, other members of his family were buried there. However, the entombed personage is also attributed to Ibrahim Tabataba'i, a Qurayshi scholar who descended from Ali ibn Abi Talib and was a companion of Ja'far al-Sadiq. He was murdered in the year 806, however he is not buried there, but rather his descendants are.

In 2022, the Mashhad al-Tabataba building was relocated to the territory of the National Museum of Egyptian Civilization after the waters of the Ain el-Sira lake threatened to cause further damage to the already partially submerged structure. The water levels had already reached 2.70 metres high, and this posed a danger towards the mausoleum, threatening it with collapse. Hence, the Mashhad al-Tabataba was carefully dismantled, and it was rebuilt at the desired location. The relocation and restoration project started in 2021, and was finally completed in 2022. Several ancient tombstones were found during the process of disassembling the structure.

== Architecture ==
The mausoleum has an area of 600 square metres. The mausoleum is located on the northeastern side. To the left of it is a well for ablutions, located inside a domed building constructed in the late 19th century. Inside the mausoleum, there are six rooms, each containing a tomb of a member of the Tabataba family. On the western side of the interior is the door to a small prayer hall. The prayer hall is square and each side is 18 metres long. It is divided into three sections by two rows of perpendicularly attached pillars. Nine domes were used to top the structure, but there are only three remaining.

== Gallery ==
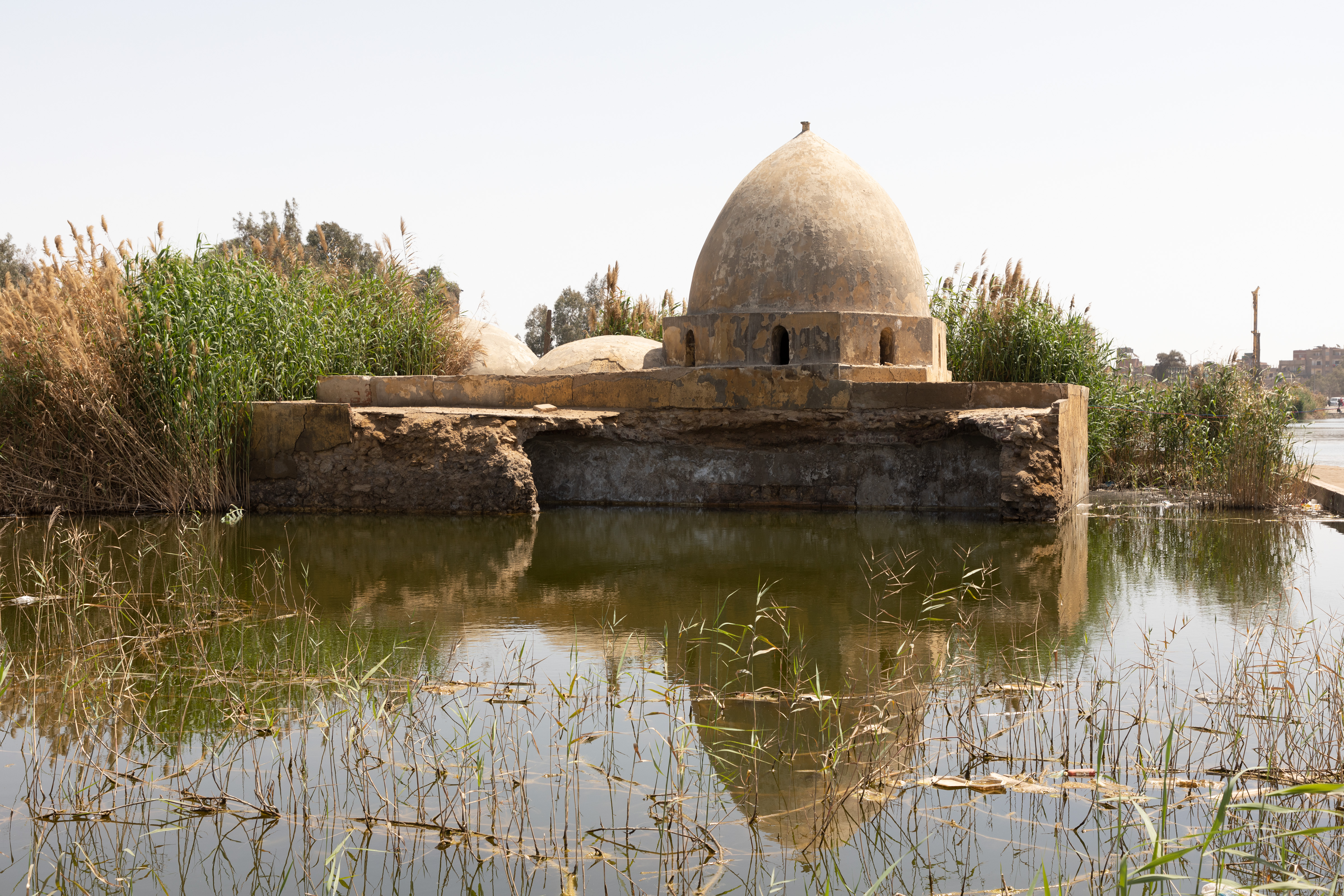

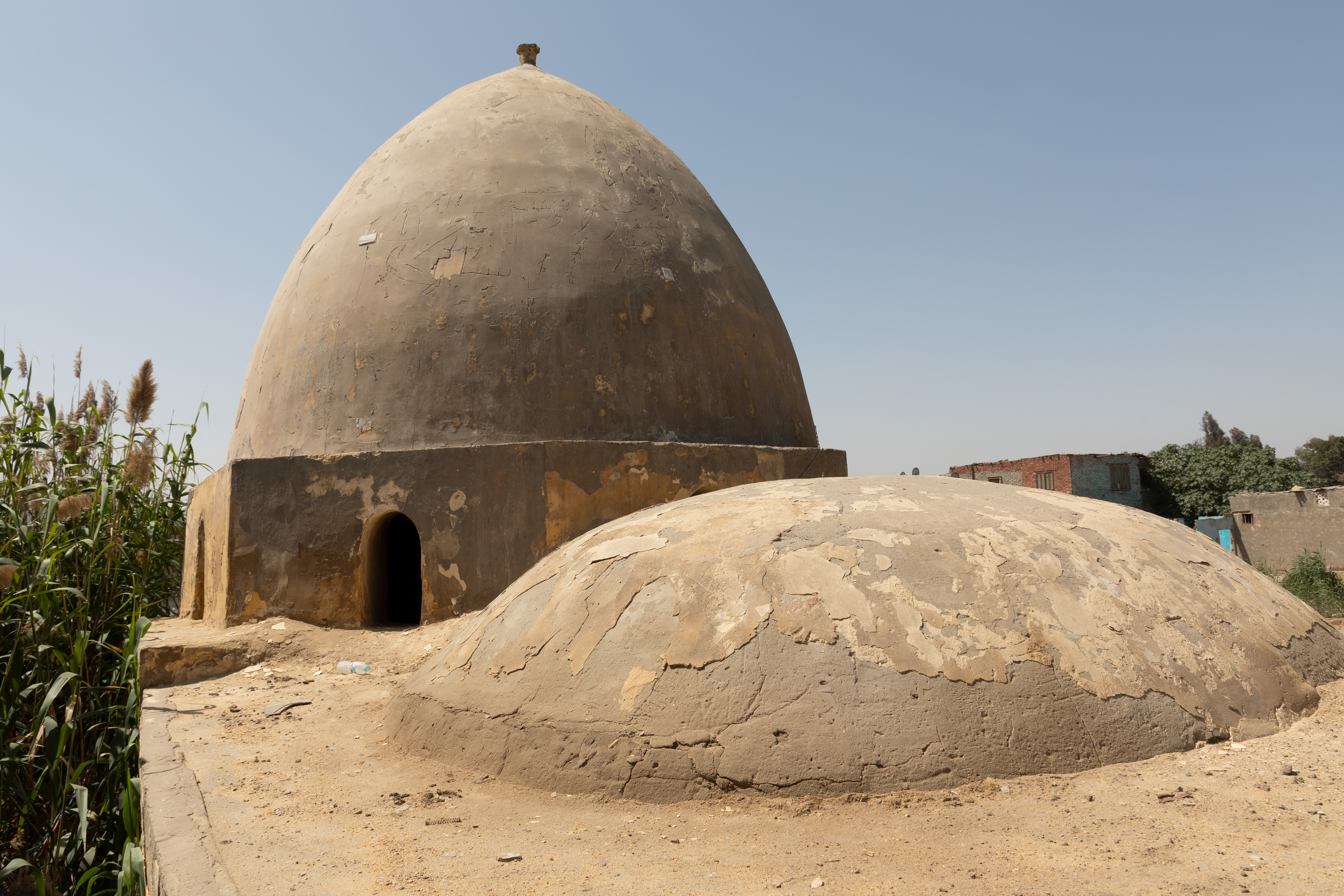

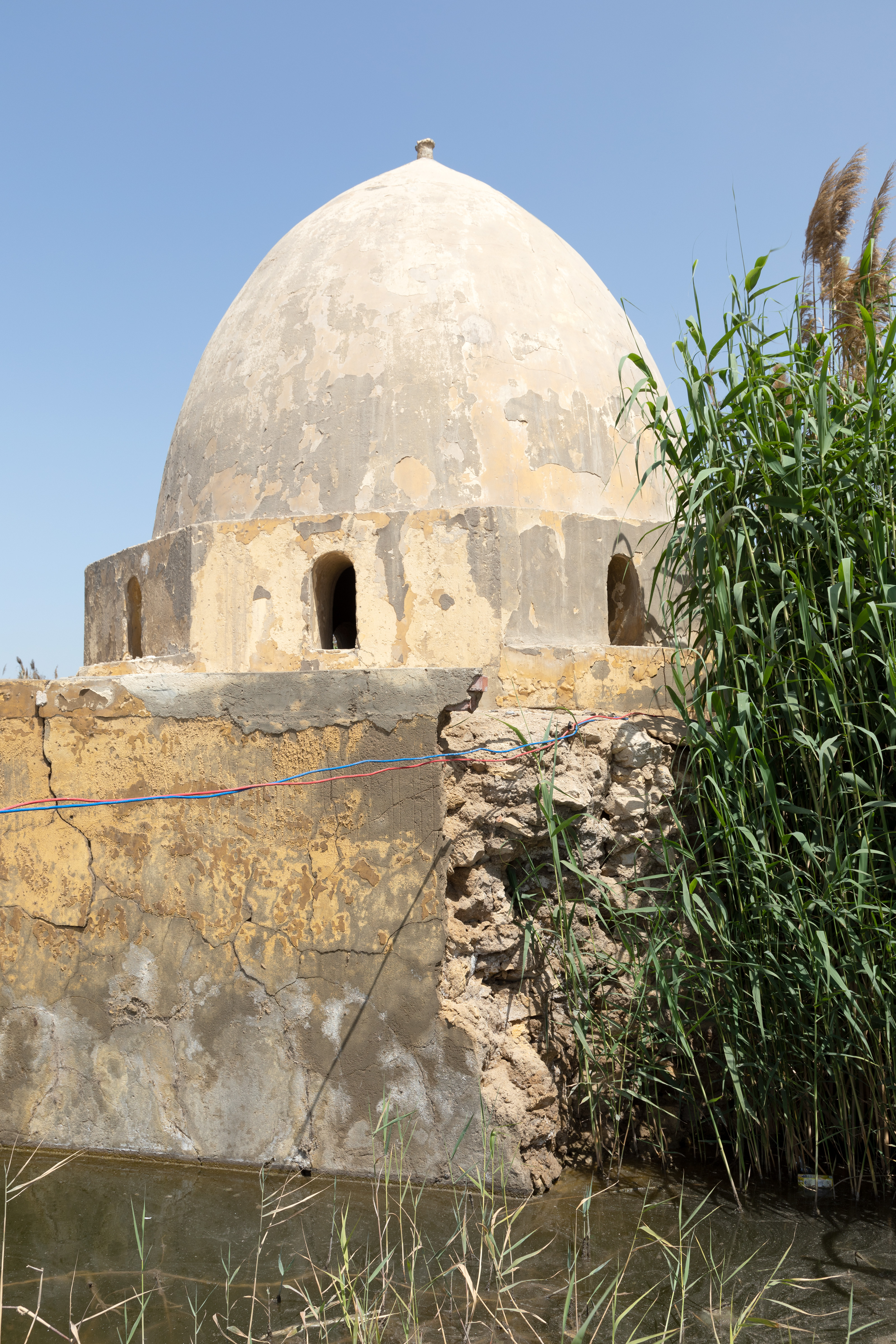

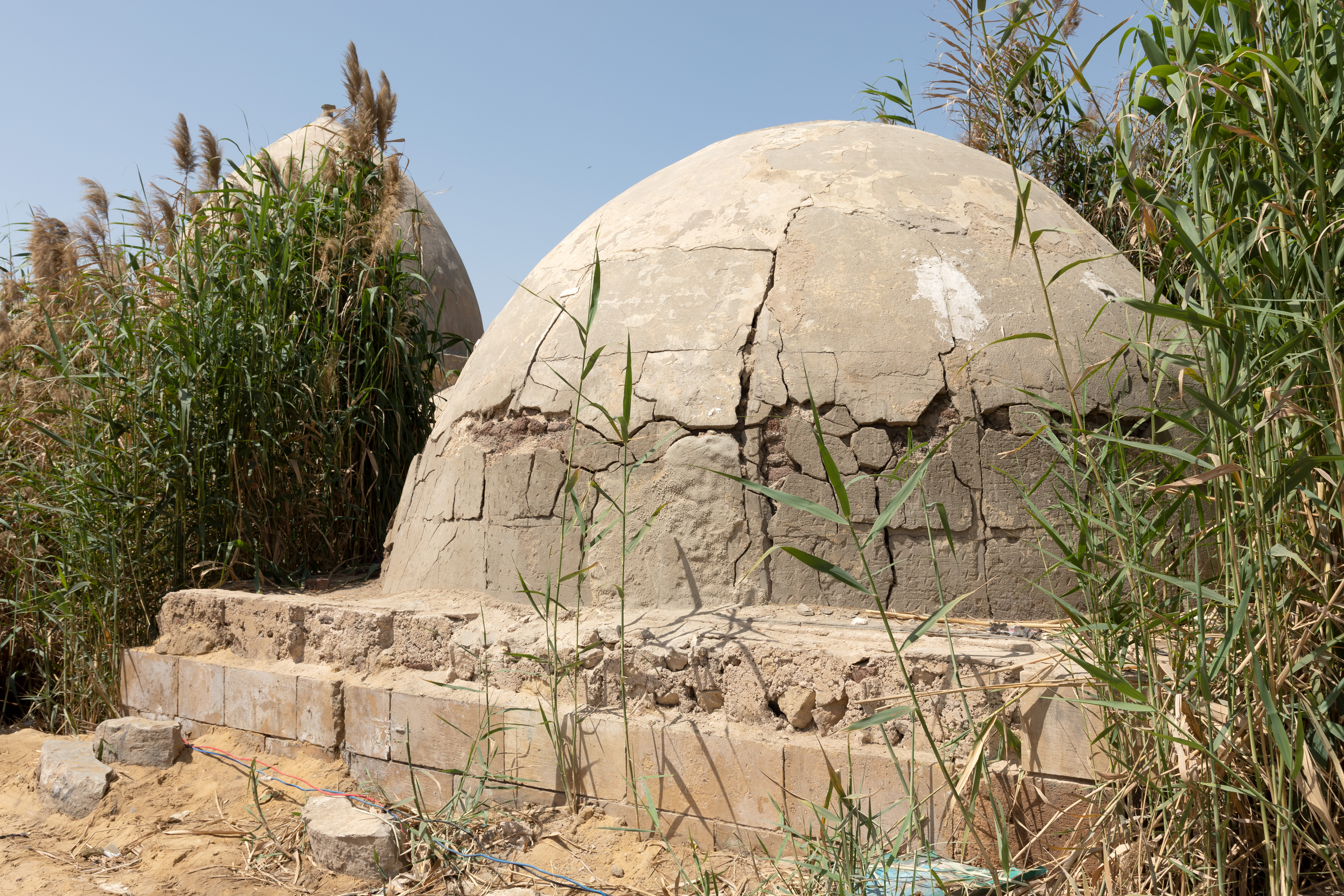

== See also ==
- Qarafa necropolis
- Sultaniyya Mausoleum
- Qubbat Afandina
- Mausoleum of Imam al-Shafi'i
- Early medieval domes
