= Tricio =

- Municipality
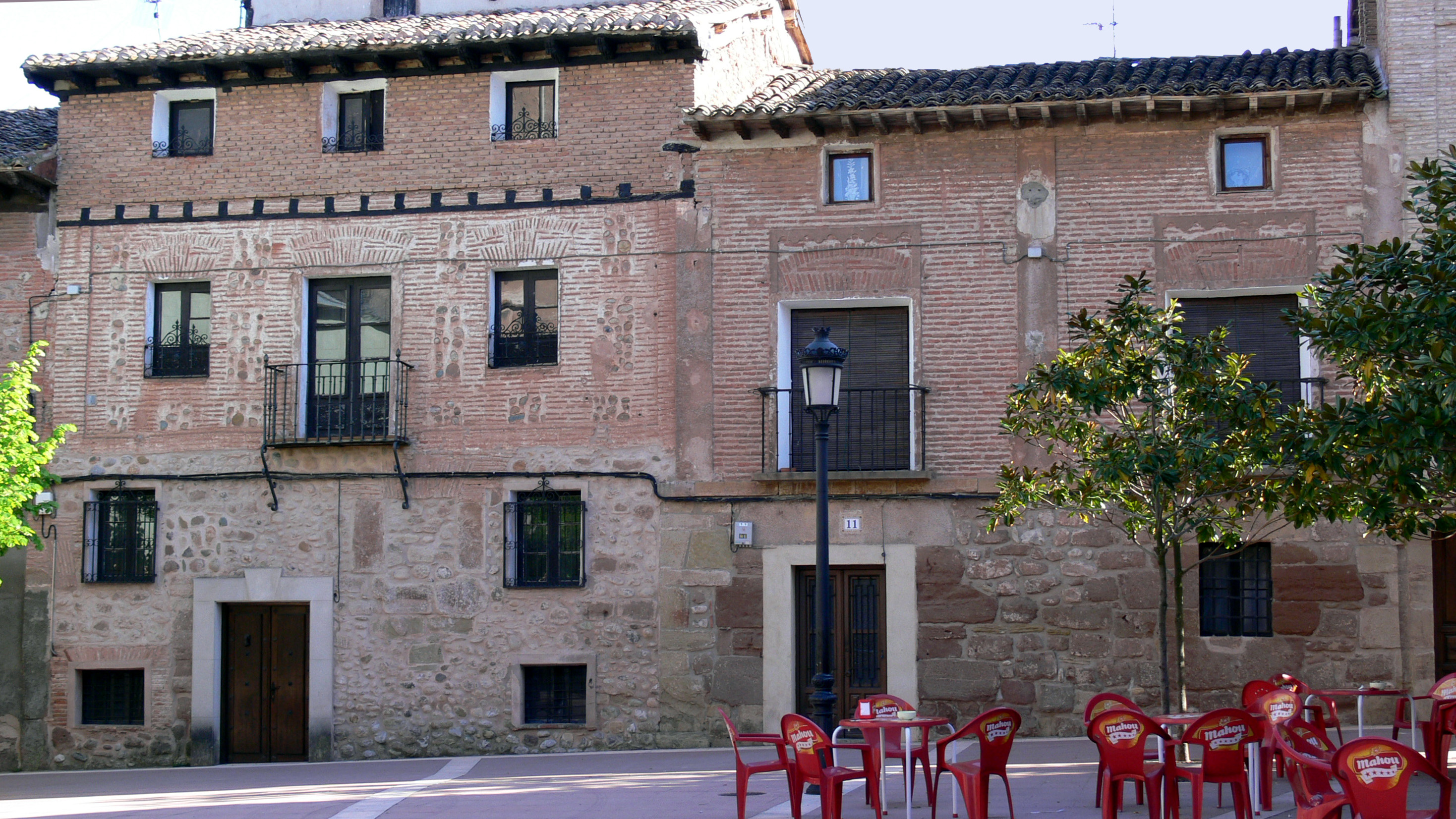
- Main square of Tricio

- Flag Coat of arms

- Location within La Rioja, Spain Location within Spain
- Coordinates: 42°24′04″N 2°43′08″W
- Country: Spain
- Autonomous community: La Rioja
- Comarca: Nájera

Government
  - Mayor: Carlos Benito Benito (PP)

Area
  - Total: 6.35 km^{2} (2.45 sq mi)
- Elevation: 564 m (1,850 ft)

Population (2025-01-01)
  - Total: 376
- Postal code: 26312

Tricio (Spanish pronunciation: [ˈtɾiθjo]) is a village in the province and autonomous community of La Rioja, Spain. The municipality covers an area of 6.35 square kilometres (2.45 sq mi) and as of 2011 had a population of 393 people.

== Politics ==
List of mayors since the democratic elections of 1979
Term	Mayor	Political party
1979–1983	Eduardo Asensio García	Grouping of electors
1983–1987	Carlos Benito Benito	AP
1987–1991	Carlos Benito Benito	AP
1991–1995	Carlos Benito Benito	PP
1995–1999	Carlos Benito Benito	PP
1999–2003	Carlos Benito Benito	PP
2003–2007	Carlos Benito Benito	PP
2007–2011	Carlos Benito Benito	PP
2011–2015	Carlos Benito Benito	PP
2015–2019	Carlos Benito Benito	PP
2019–2023	n/d	n/d
2023–	n/d	n/d

== Places of interest ==
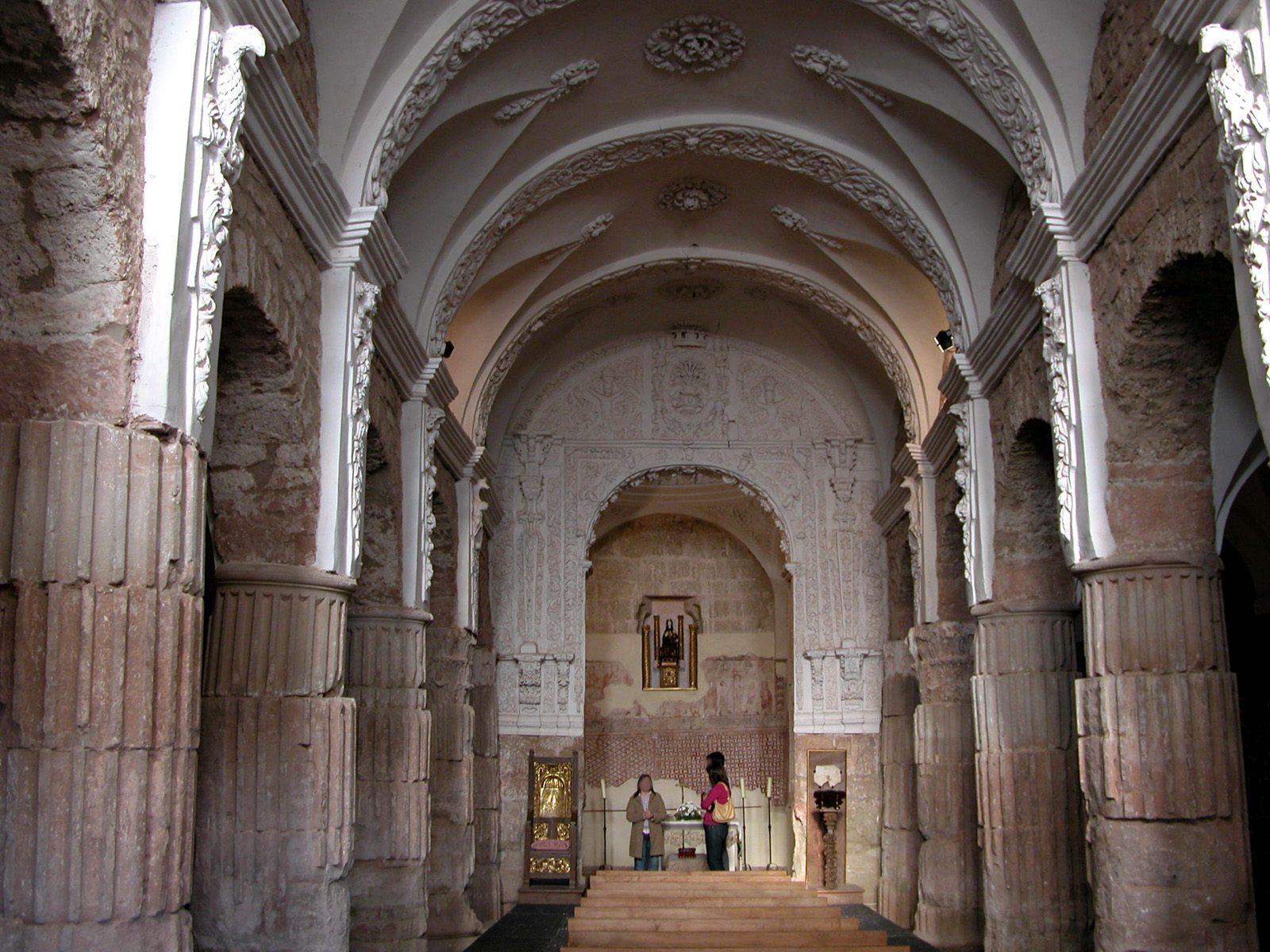
Basilica of Saint Mary of the Arches. Tricio

- Basilica of Saint Mary of the Arches

== Notable people ==
- Mariano de la Paz Graells y de la Agüera
- Celedón Pardo y Agüero
