= Albenga Baptistery =

Church building in Albenga, Italy

Coordinates: 44.0494°N 8.2130°E

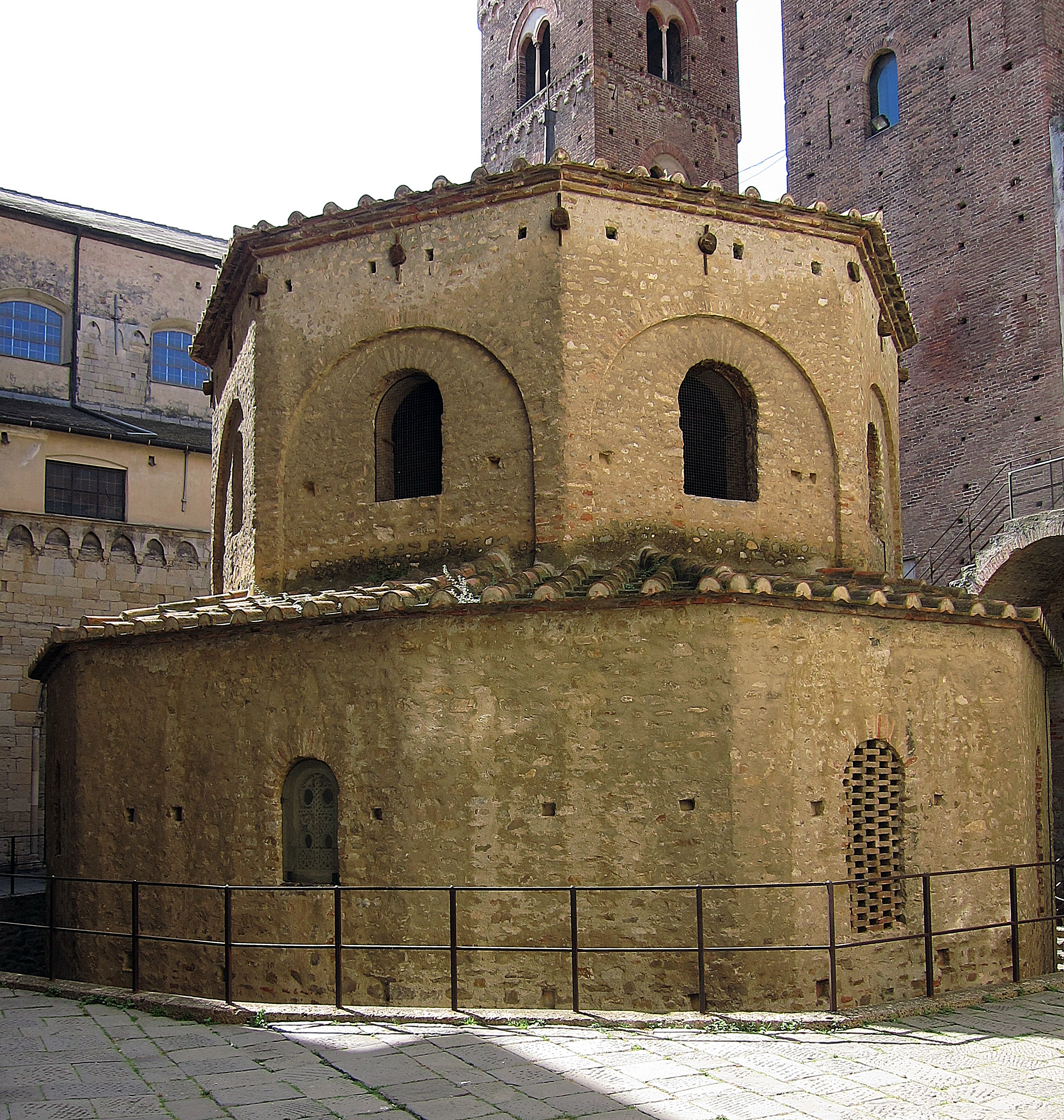
Albenga Baptistery

The Baptistery of Albenga is a paleochristian religious structure in Albenga, province of Savona, in the region of Liguria of northern Italy. It is an example of 5th-century late-Ancient Roman architecture with mosaic decoration, and stands adjacent to the Albenga Cathedral of San Michele Arcangelo.

== Description ==
Inscriptions date construction to the 5th century under a Flavio Costanzo. The layout is that of a decagon with an octagonal drum. The building still retains an octagonal baptismal font and 6th century mosaics with allegorical symbols of Christ such as the Labarum (Chi - Rho) and the Alpha and Omega. The walls have traces of 15th-century frescoes. The interior houses two Lombard burial monuments. The original foundations are lower than the present one. The roof was remodeled and replaced in 1898 by a wooden structure. The baptistery is now part of the town Museo Diocesano.

The niche with late-Roman Empire Christian mosaics depicts an Alpha-Omega within three concentric circles symbolizing the Trinity, and surrounded by 12 doves symbolizing the apostles who disseminated the teachings under the guidance of the Holy Spirit. Finally two sheep stand in a field around a cross. The Latin inscription of the arch recalls relics held in the church.

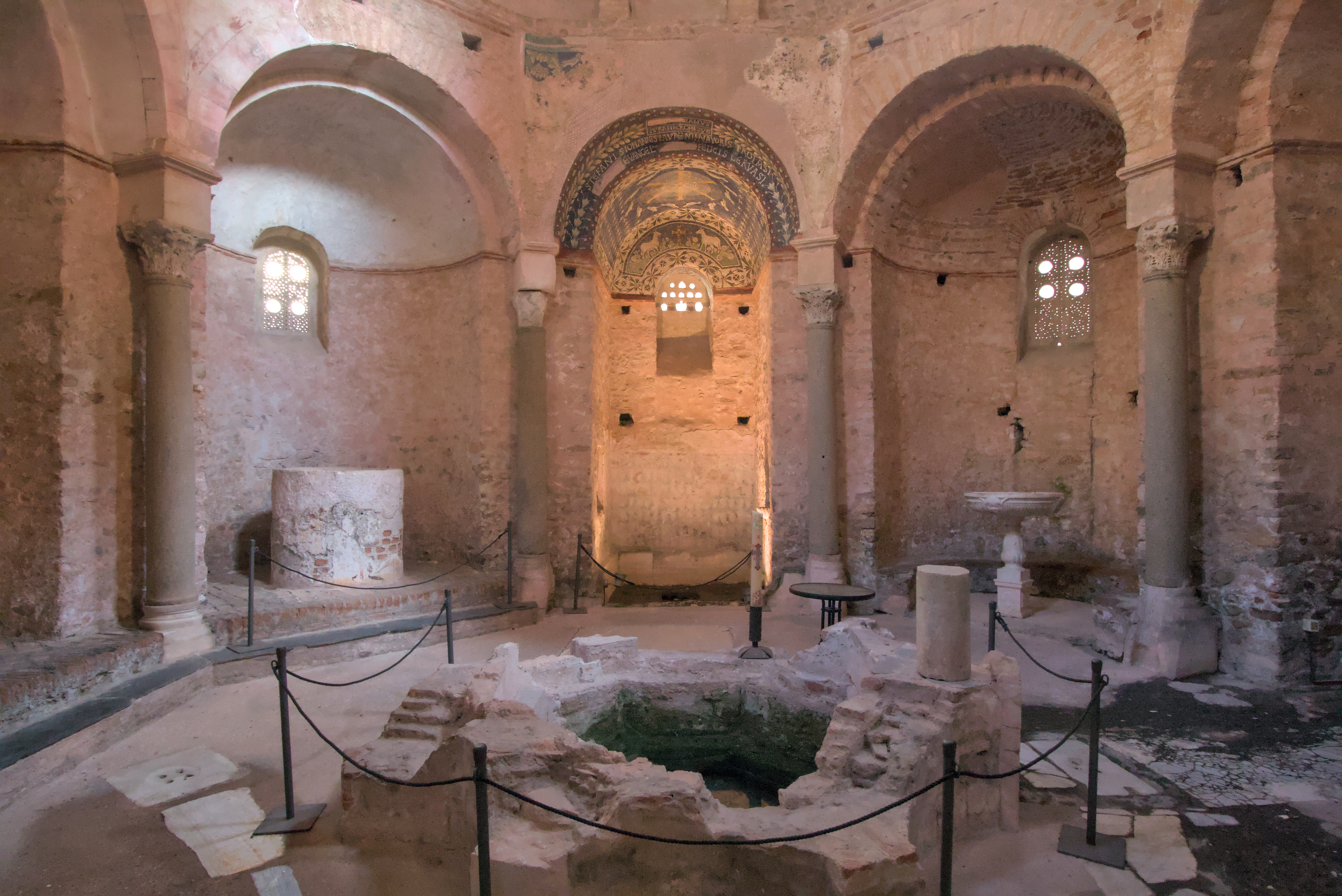
Interior of the baptistery

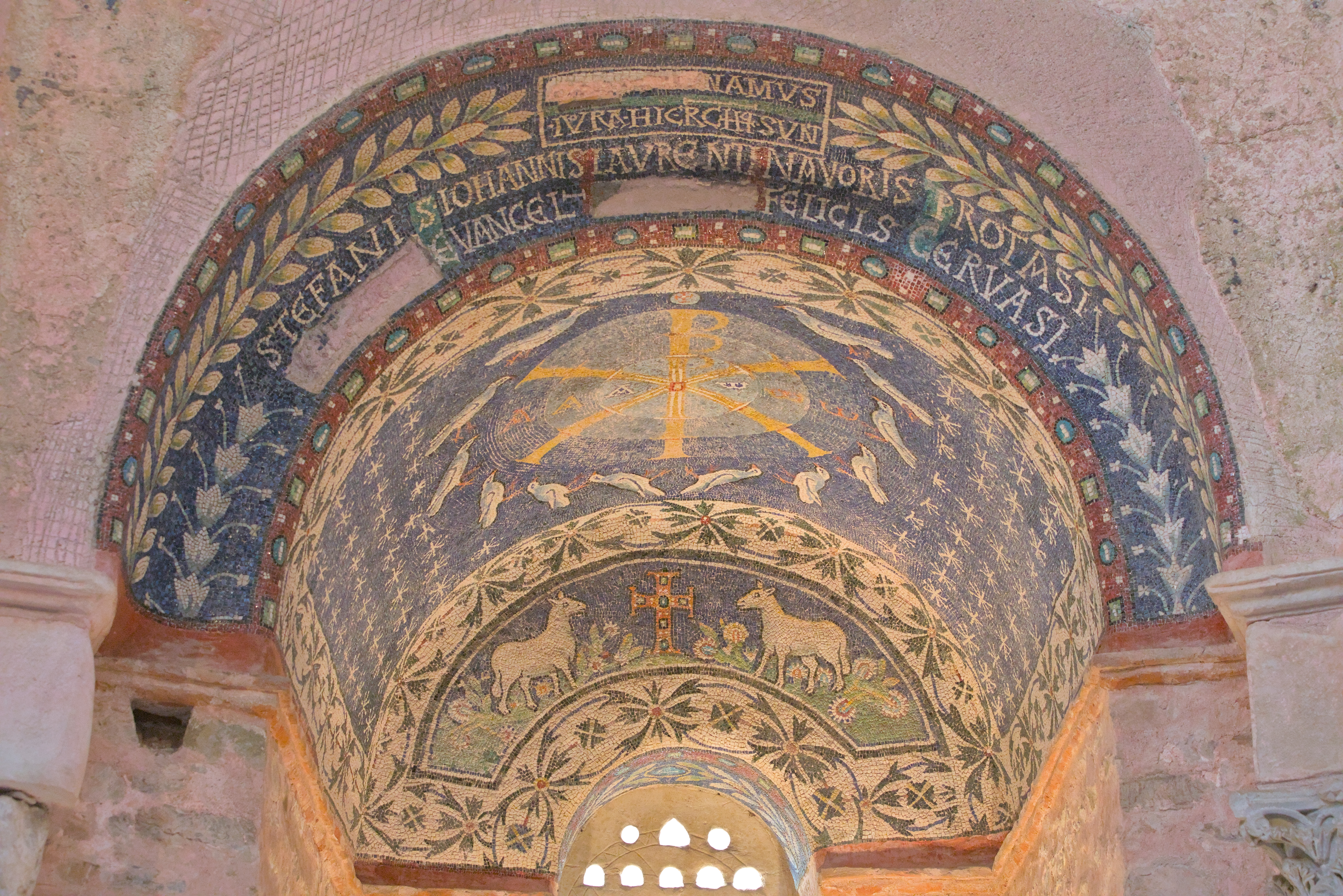
Niche with early Christian mosaics

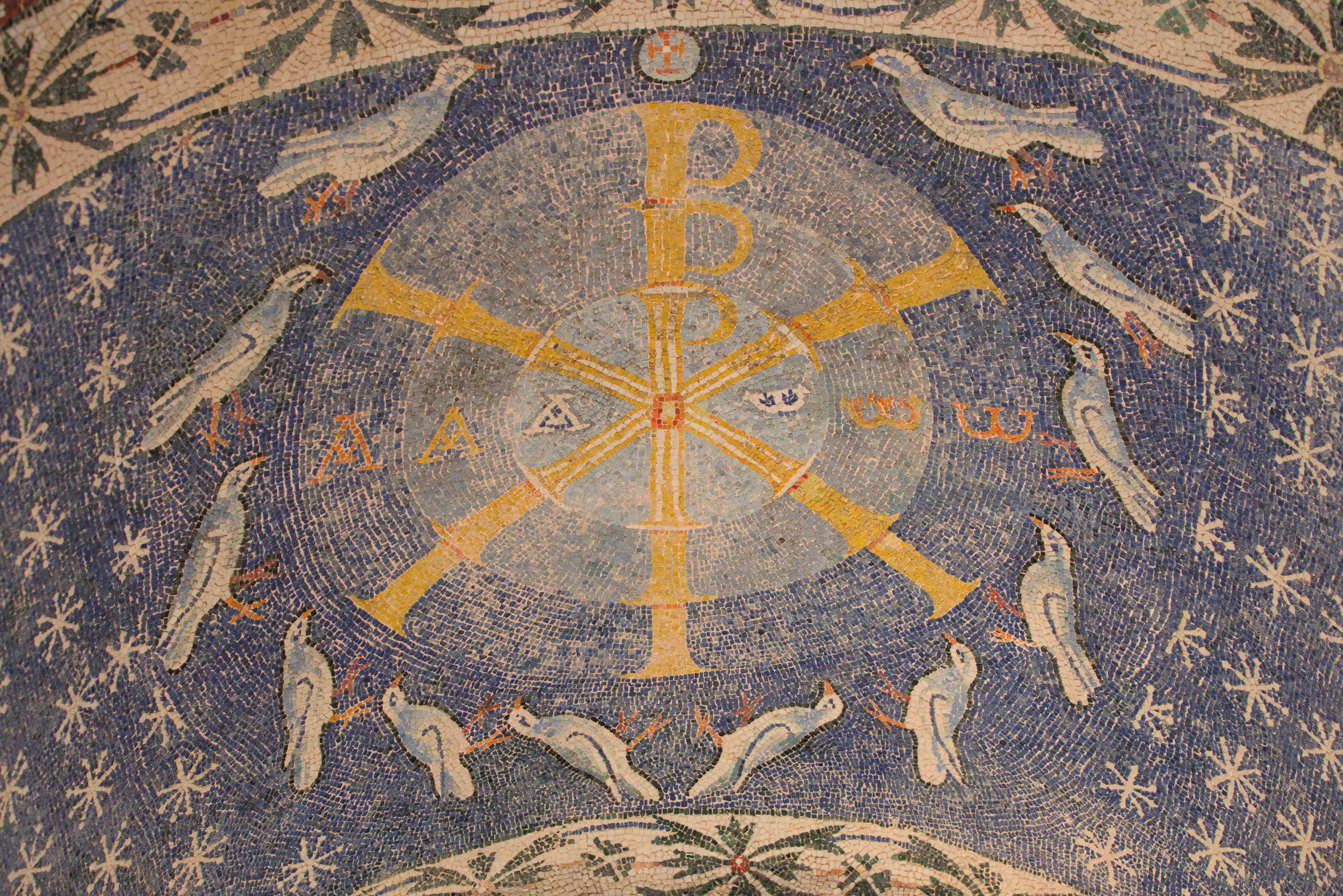
Detail of the mosaics

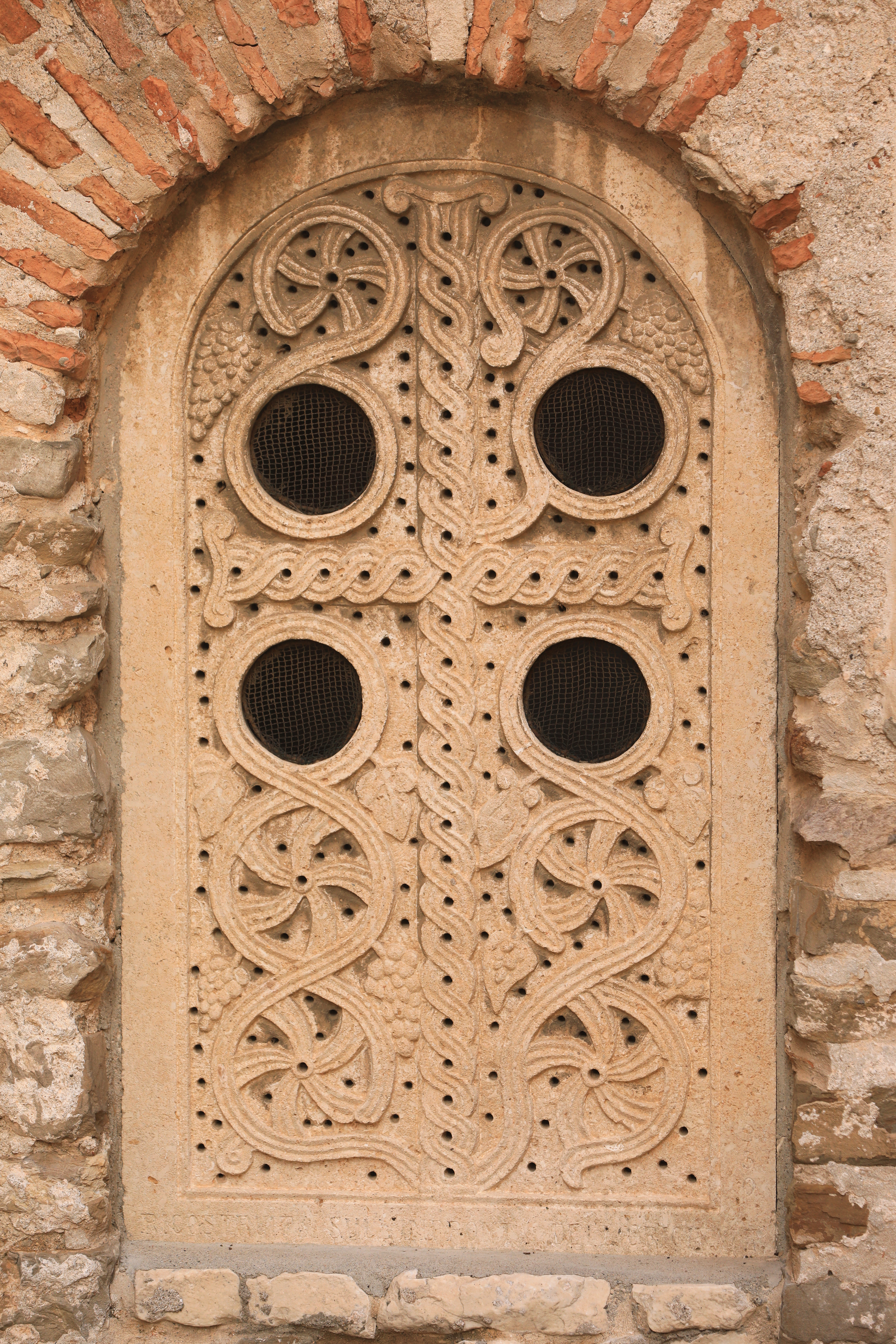
A carved window

== See also ==
- Early medieval domes
