= Dome of the Ascension =

Islamic building in Al-Aqsa, Jerusalem

Coordinates: 31°46′41.58″N 35°14′05.96″E

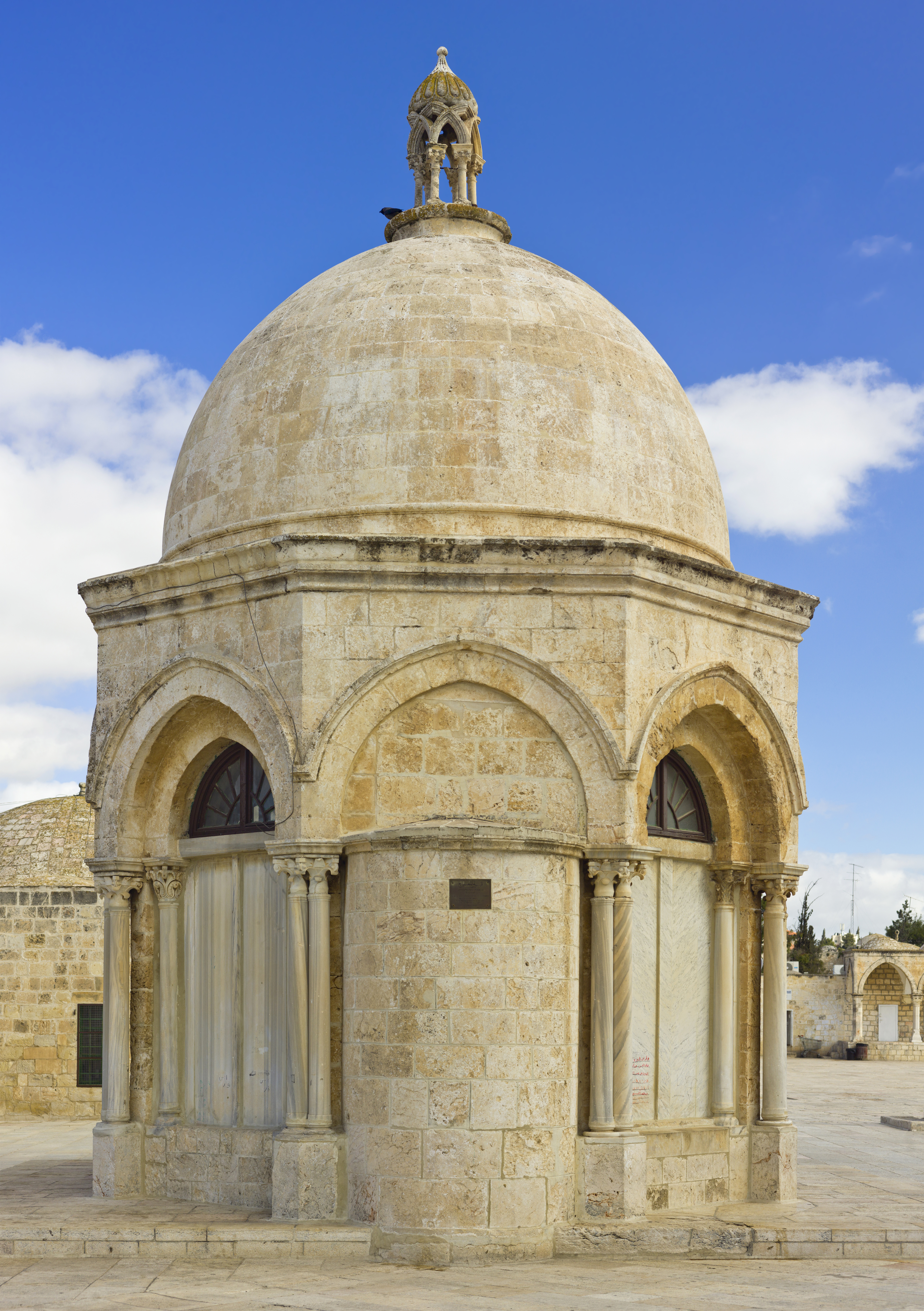
Dome of the Ascension of Muhammad

The Dome of the Ascension (Arabic: قبة المعراج, romanized: Qubbat al-Miʿrāj) is an Islamic free-standing domed structure built by the Umayyads that stands just north the Dome of the Rock on the al-Aqsa compound in Jerusalem.

It commemorates the Islamic Prophet Muhammad's ascension (al-Miʿrāj) to heaven, according to Islamic tradition. The Dome of the Ascension is part of the Muslim prayer-route.

== Location ==
It is located in al-Aqsa, northwest of the Dome of the Rock.

== History ==
The original edifice was probably built by either the Umayyads or the Abbasids (sometime between 7th-10th centuries). The dome's exact year of construction and its founder's name remain unknown.

The current edifice was built by the Ayyubid governor of Jerusalem, Izz ad-Din az-Zanjili (Amir ʿIzz ad-Din ʿUthman bin ʿAli Abdullah az-Zanjili) in 1200 or 1201 (during Sultan Al-Adil I’s reign the brother of Saladin Al-Ayyubi), using Crusader construction materials. An Arabic inscription dated to 1200 or 1201 (597 AH) describes it as renovated and rededicated as a waqf.

The structure, notably its column capitals, are of Frankish style and construction, but some repair or renovation was done in or after the Ayyubid dynasty period.

== Architecture ==
The Dome of the Ascension is a small octagonal dome based on 30 marble columns (in clusters of three or four). The open space between the columns was later sealed using marble slabs. The dome was covered with lead sheets, but they were recently replaced by white stone plates. Today, the dome is covered with marble slabs between the marble columns that keep it standing, and there is an entrance door on the north side of the structure. In the southern part of the dome, it has a mihrab (a niche pointing towards the qibla).

What makes this dome stand out is the crown-like mini-dome (a monopteros-like cupola) on top of its main dome.

Its architectural style can be defined as Umayyad or Abbasid, although its current edifice is Ayyubid and construction materials are from the Crusaders.

== Crusader era ==
The dome did not exist in the Crusader era, as it was not described by Crusader travelers during their visit to the mosque during the Crusader occupation period, and there was no mention of the presence of a dome west of the Dome of the Rock. The Ayyubid inscription talks about rebuilding a dome after its disappearance, guided by the information found in history books, and some Crusader materials were used in the construction of the dome by the Ayyubids, as the Ayyubids used some Crusader materials in the buildings they built.

== Name ==
Umayyad era: It was mentioned in the early historical books under the name of Qubbat Al-Miraj (The Dome of the Ascension), which may indicate that it had this name in the Umayyad era as well.

Ayyubid era: The Dome of the Ascension was called in the Ayyubid period as "The Dome of the Prophet" Some indicate that this derived from its name (the Dome of the Mi'raj (Ascension) of the Prophet), so there were those who call it the Dome of the Prophet, and others the Dome of the Mi'raj (Ascension).

Mamluk era: Its name in the Mamluk era is The Dome of Miraj (The Dome of the Ascension).

== Ottoman era ==
In the year 1195 AH, 1781 AD, the verse of the Isra’ was placed over its mihrab, which was covered with Ottoman faience, and confirming its name as the Dome of the Miraj (Ascension).

== See also ==
- Early medieval domes
- High medieval domes
