= Abu Bakr Muhammad ibn Ahmad al-Wasiti =

Arab author of the 1019 book Merits of Jerusalem

Academic work
- Main interests: Early Muslim traditions on Jerusalem
- Notable works: Fada'il Bayt al-Muqaddas ("Merits of Jerusalem"), 1019/20 CE

Abu Bakr Muhammad ibn Ahmad al-Wasiti was the preacher (khatib) of al-Aqsa Mosque in 1019–1020 (AH 410), the year he wrote a treatise entitled Concerning the (religious) status of Jerusalem, better known as Fada'il Bayt al-Muqaddas, also spelled Fada'il al-Bayt al-Maqdis, literally "Merits/Virtues of Jerusalem".

== Significance ==
Al-Wasiti and his cousin, Ibn al-Murajja, are both known as diarists belonging to the same prominent family from Jerusalem, Abd al-Rahman. Their writings are among the early examples of a classical Islamic literary genre praising the virtues of the holy cities, the Fada'il al-Mudun ("virtues of cities"), and specifically to the Fada'il Bayt al-Maqdis, literally, the "Merits of the Holy House", Bayt al-Maqdis being an early Muslim name for Jerusalem. Al-Wasiti uses as his main source the earliest known book of this genre dedicated to Jerusalem, the now lost Fada'il Bayt al-Maqdis written by al-Walid ibn Hammad al-Ramli al-Zayyat (d. 912), himself also from Jerusalem.

The fact that al-Wasiti lived before 1099, the year Jerusalem fell to the Crusaders, makes him particularly interesting, as his religious praise of the city is not yet motivated by the purpose of fuelling Muslim fervour for its liberation. As a native scholar, Al-Wasiti records the religious merits of Jerusalem, which have two main aspects in Early Muslim tradition: eschatological and prophetic. In this context he writes about the construction of the Dome of the Rock by Caliph Abd al-Malik ibn Marwan, helping us understand how Mount Moriah became assimilated into the Muslim tradition, with a focus on three elements: Creation and the Last Judgement, David and Solomon, and Prophet Mohammed's Night Journey. The first two are of course influences of Jewish and Christian biblical and para-biblical narratives and traditions, constituting Isra'iliyat.

== See also ==
- Religious significance of Jerusalem
  - Jerusalem in Islam
