= Hermitage of Santa María de Lara =

Visigothic church near Burgos, Spain

Santa María de Lara
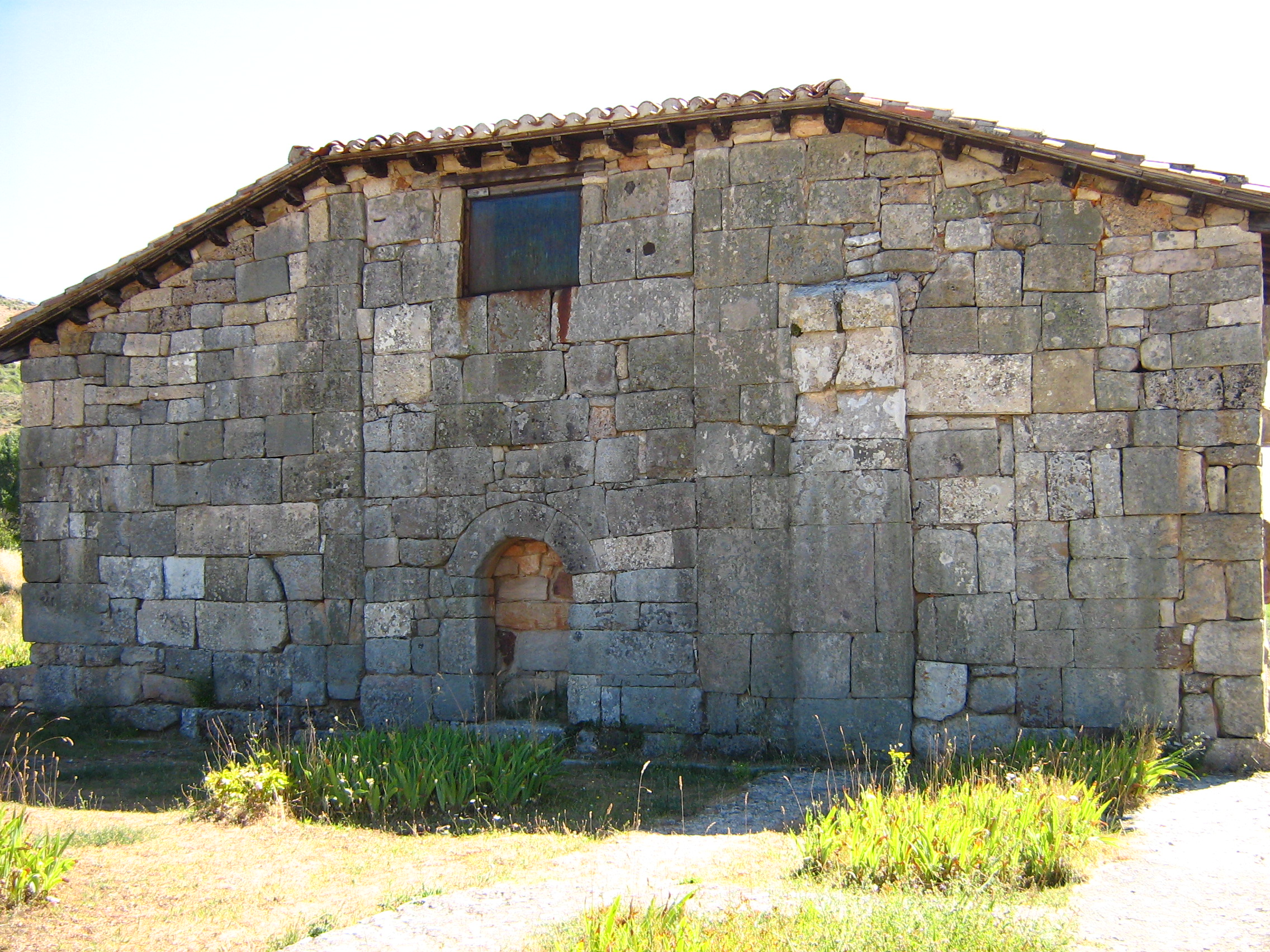
- Current (north-)western facade, corresponding to the (north-)west side of the transept inside the original church. The nave and isles west of the transept, once stretching toward the bottom left corner in the photo, have collapsed, leaving behind only their foundations.

- Location within Spain
- 42°07′28″N 3°28′23″W
- Location: near Quintanilla de las Viñas, Castile and León, Spain

Architecture
- Architectural type: cruciform basilica-shaped church
- Style: pre-Romanesque (Visigothic)
- Completed: late 7th/early 8th century

Specifications
- Materials: sandstone and limestone blocks

The church of Santa María de Lara, also known as the Ermita (English: hermitage) de Santa María, is generally considered to be one of a small group of Visigothic pre-Romanesque churches on the Iberian Peninsula. It is located near the village of Quintanilla de las Viñas, not far from the city of Burgos, in the Castile and León region in Spain. Archaeologists have yet to confirm its period of construction but the church has been placed by scholars between the 7th century, where it is more frequently located, and the 10th century. The church is notable not only for its age and architectural type, but also because it is believed to contain the earliest representation of Christ in Spanish religious art. It was classified as a national monument on November 25, 1929.

== Description ==
The church is not oriented to the east, as usual, but to the south-east.

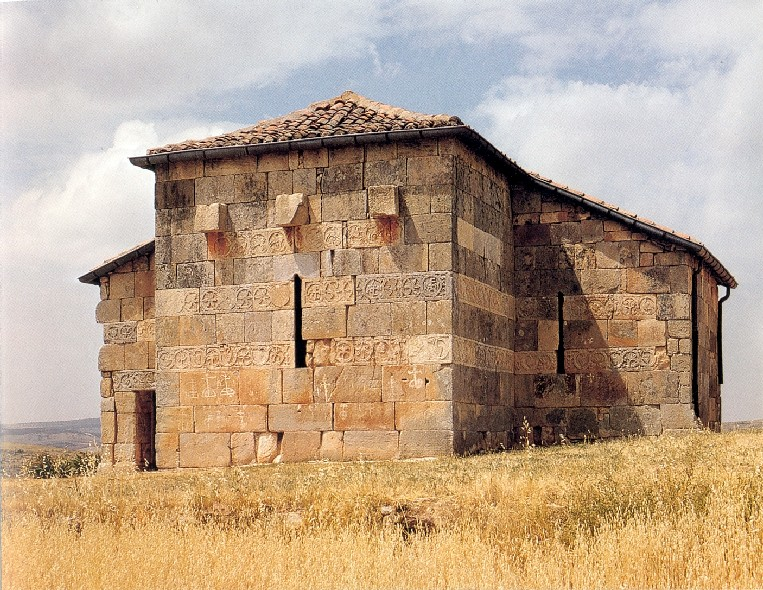
Current state: apse and transept of the original church, covered by a modern wooden roof.

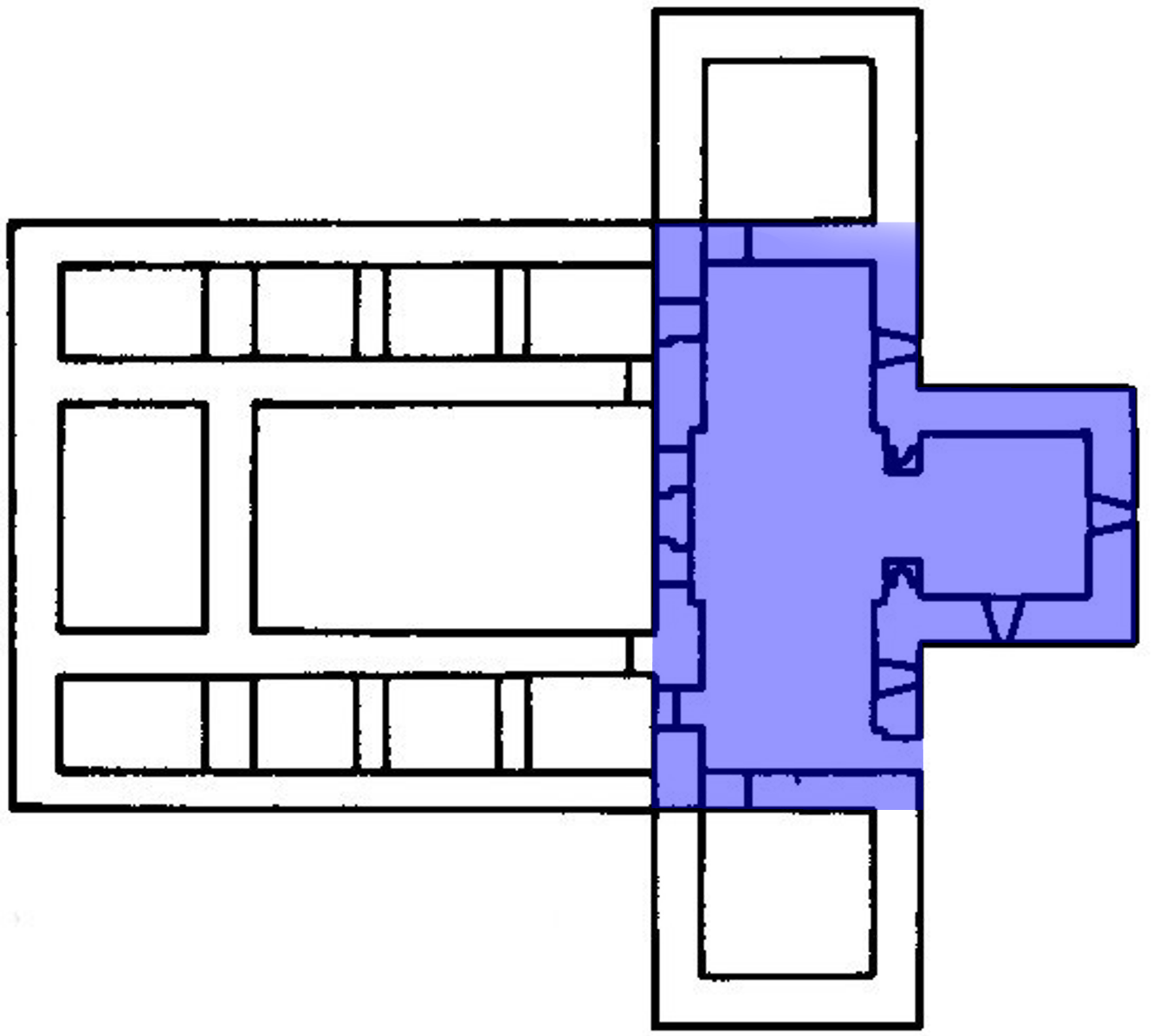
Ground plan of the original church, with the still standing section shaded in blue. Of the non-shaded areas only the foundations remain. (F. Íñiguez Almech, 1955)

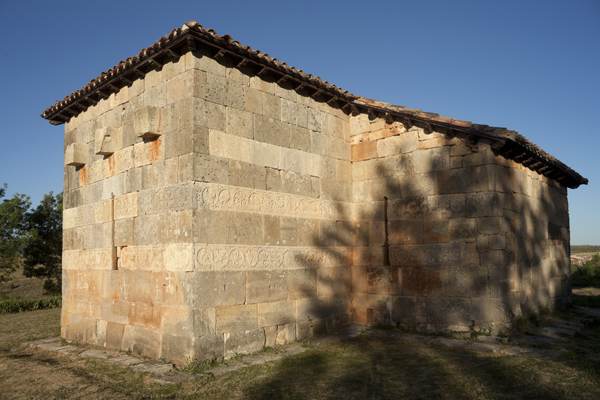
Apse with continuous sculpted frieze bands

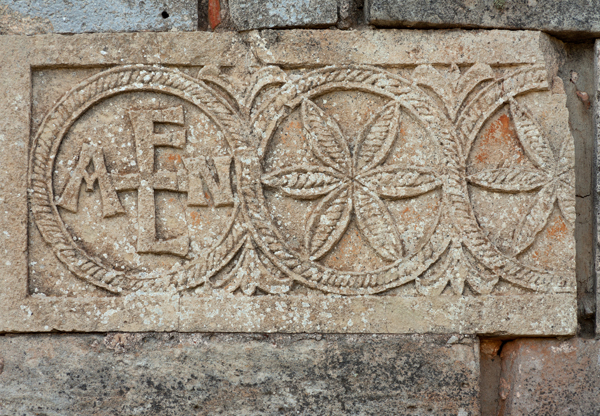
Detail of external frieze containing one of several monograms

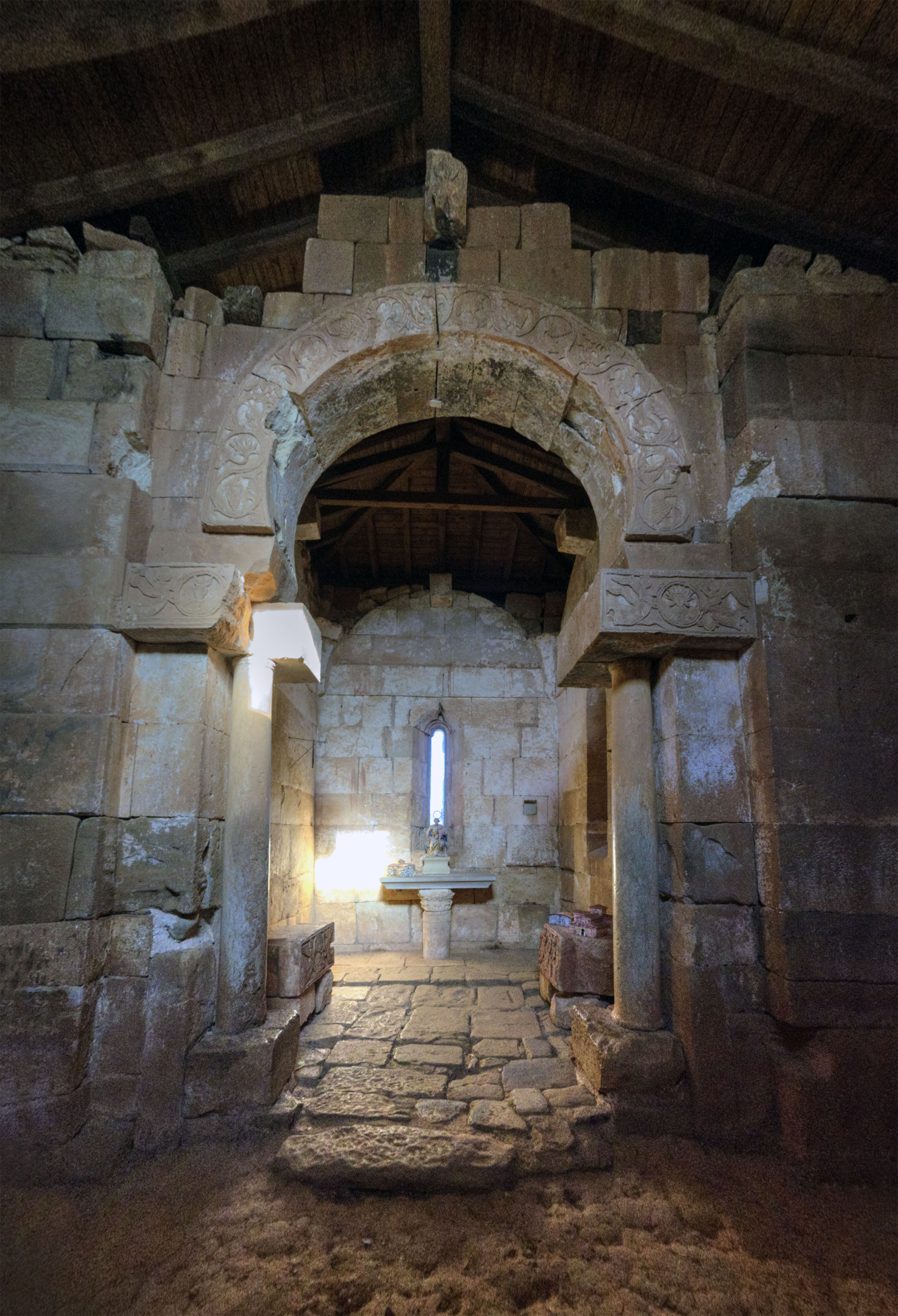
Triumphal arch and altar apse

== History ==
=== Construction and abandonment (7th/8th-9th c.) ===
The geographical area surrounding Santa María de Lara was populated by numerous Roman villae preceding the construction of the church.

After the Visigoths invaded the Iberian Peninsula (particularly the area we now know as Spain) and the Romans had left the area, the Visigoths settled in Quintillana de las Viñas and built the church of Santa María De Lara around the beginning of the 8th century. Soon afterwards, in 711, the Moors invaded the Iberian Peninsula and Lara was abandoned as the populace fled north to the Picos de Europa mountains.

=== Reconquista and reconstruction (10th c.) ===
In the 9th century, during the Spanish Reconquista, the areas that were previously abandoned (such as Lara) were repopulated, although the buildings were largely in ruins. Since the church of Santa María de Lara had been neglected during the Moorish period, it had to be rebuilt. A funerary stela that is now housed in the Museum of Burgos that has been studied by archaeologists, is believed to record the date of the reconstruction of Santa María De Lara. It is inscribed with the letters DCCCC (...), and despite the only partial remnant of the date, which represents the Roman numeral for 900, it is widely believed that this refers to the year 902, bearing in mind that the inscription adheres to the Spanish medieval dating system, from which 38 years must be subtracted to obtain the European chronological year.

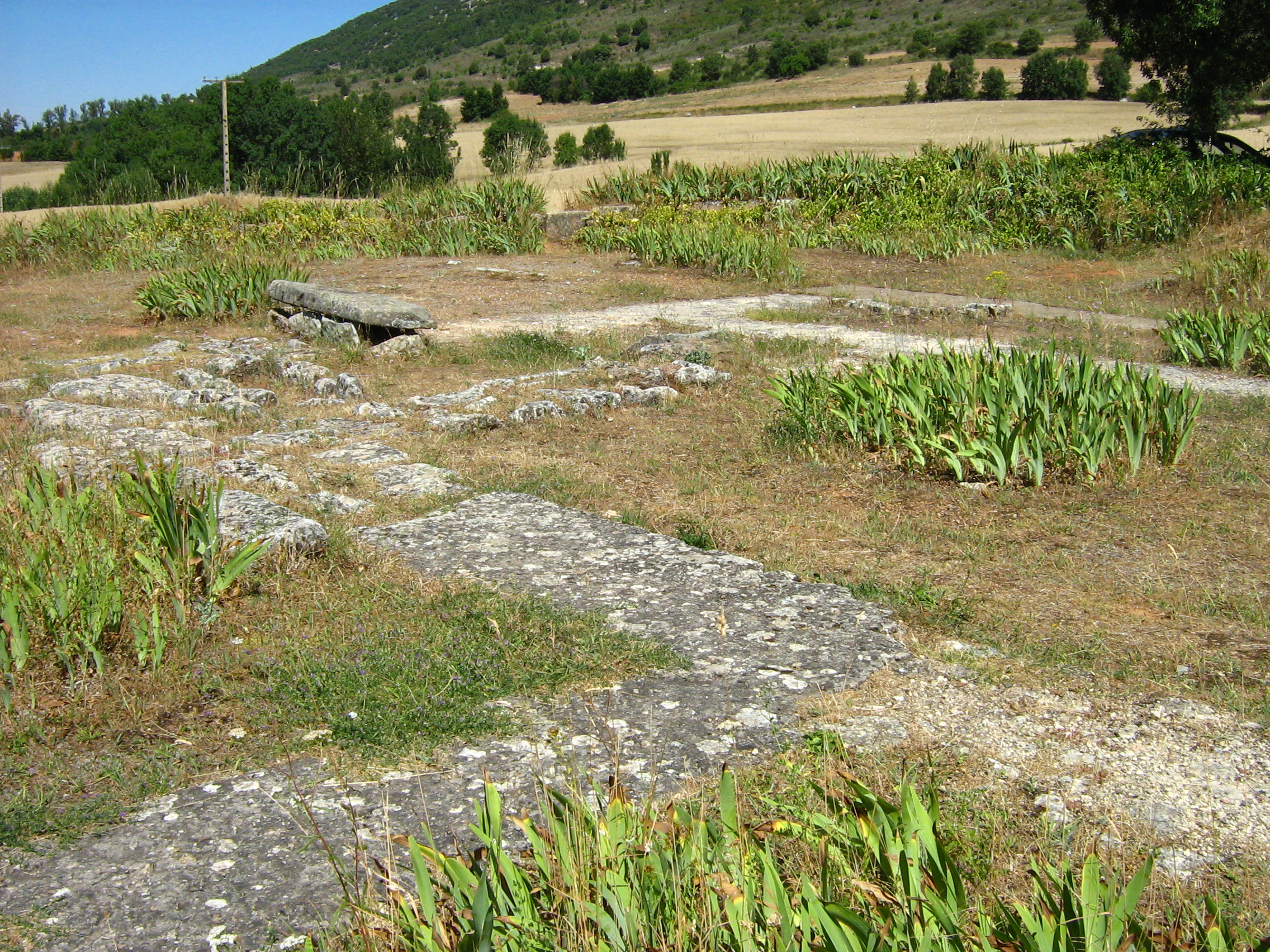
A view of the western side of the church. The ruins of the foundations of the previously sizeable nave can be seen, as well as rooms that provided for the monks who lived in Santa María de Lara during the 10th century. This part of the church collapsed during the period of time that the church was abandoned, from around 1100.

A document that has been dated from the year 967 (or the Spanish medieval date 929) records a monetary donation to the church and the monastery that, at that time, was under the control of Santa María de Lara, by a woman named Muniadona, the mother of Fernán González of Castile. However, due to the lack of documents from that early era, historians have been unable to verify the location of this monastery.

=== Decline (11th c.) ===
In 1038, the church was donated to the nearby monastery of San Pedro de Arlanza and from then on the church began a gradual decline both in religious status and architectural stability. Undated documents from the Archbishopric of Burgos later refer to it as a 'hermitage'. After that, the church was abandoned and parts of the building collapsed, and much of its ancient carvings and decoration was lost.

=== Modern rediscovery, restoration ===
In 1921, a local parish priest was walking near Quintanilla de las Viñas when he came across the remains of Santa María de Lara, forgotten since the early Middle Ages and hidden by thick bush. Don Bonifacio Zamora, the priest, strived to bring his discovery to the interest of historians and experts. However, until 1927, he was unsuccessful and the site was used simply as a corral for livestock. In 1927, the church was finally brought to the attention of experts such as Helmut Schlunk, a notable German scholar who, amongst others, visited this 'newly discovered' Visigoth church in order to research it.

After two years of studying the site, it was granted 'National Monument' status on 25 November 1929. Later, during the 1930s, extensive excavations were carried out that revealed a large amount of data that shows the area was inhabited from early times. The research undertaken in the 1920s and 1930s has given us almost all we know about the church today. Many of the artefacts uncovered, such as funerary stelae, dolmens and objects from Roman villae, are now housed in the Museo Provincial de Burgos.'

Up until the 1970s, the church could only be reached by a local road, until Jesús Vicario Moreno, who looked after Santa María de Lara and showed it to visitors until his recent death, oversaw the construction of an asphalt road leading to the church from Quintanilla de las Viñas, where he lived. Tourism and visitors to the site have provided money to keep the church stable and protect it with projects such as the modern wooden roof. The numbers of visitors have increased significantly; in 1992, 8000 tourists were recorded to have visited the site.

==== Theft and recovery of two reliefs ====
In 2004, two stones depicting evangelists were stolen from the church. After a tip was received in 2010 that they had been offered for sale as garden reliefs in Great Britain, they were found by Dutch art detective Arthur Brand in a British garden and transferred to the Spanish embassy in January 2019.

== Medieval donors ==
=== Lady Flammola ===
An inscription carved on the right side of the triumphal arch within the church mentions a Lady Flammola. Translations of the inscription differ, but it is believed that the Latin text, which reads + OC EXIGUUM EXIGUA OFF(ERO) D(E)O FLAMMOLA VOTUM, means, "Flammola, the least of the least, makes this promised offering to God" (an alternate translation is, "This small gift the Lady Flammola offers to God").

Dona Lambra, as modern historians now call this Lady Flammola, may have ordered the restoration of the church in the 10th century and supported it with money she donated. But, as numerous women dating from that period bore the same name, without a more accurate dating of the inscription scholars have been unable to determine precisely which Flammola ordered the restoration.

=== Fernán González family ===
Muniadona features in an early document from 967, which records her giving a donation to the church. Muniadona was the mother of Count Fernán González of Castile (who at that point ruled over Castile).

Fernán González of Castile, the first independent count of Castile, was closely linked to the church, which is evident for three reasons. First, he was a member of the influential Lara family, and shares his name with the church. He grew up in, and later commanded, the castle of Lara, which is visible from Santa María de Lara with favourable weather. He was buried in the monastery of San Pedro de Arlanza, which at that point owned Santa María de Lara.

== Gallery ==
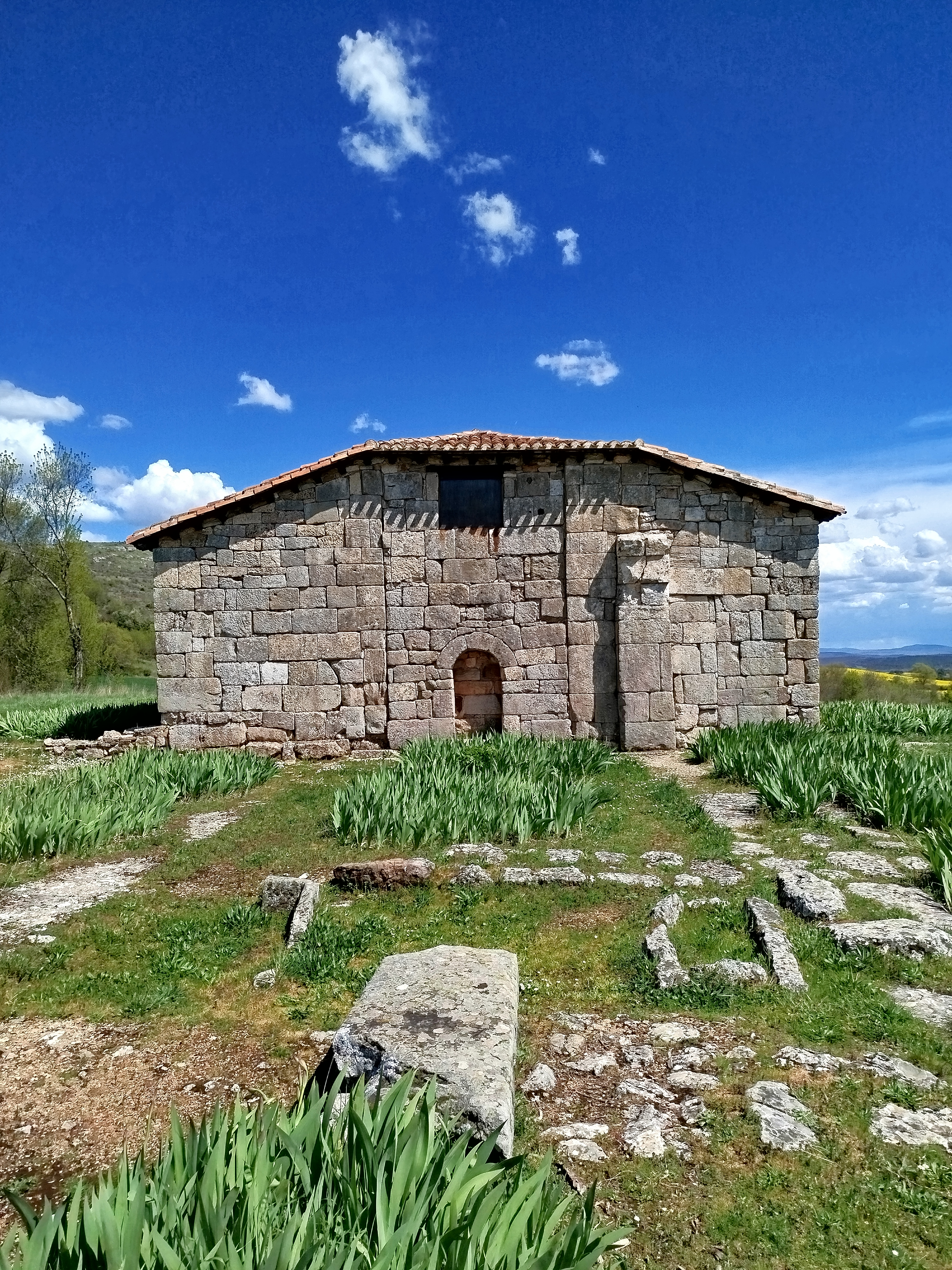
View from NW with fundations of collapsed nave and isles in the foreground

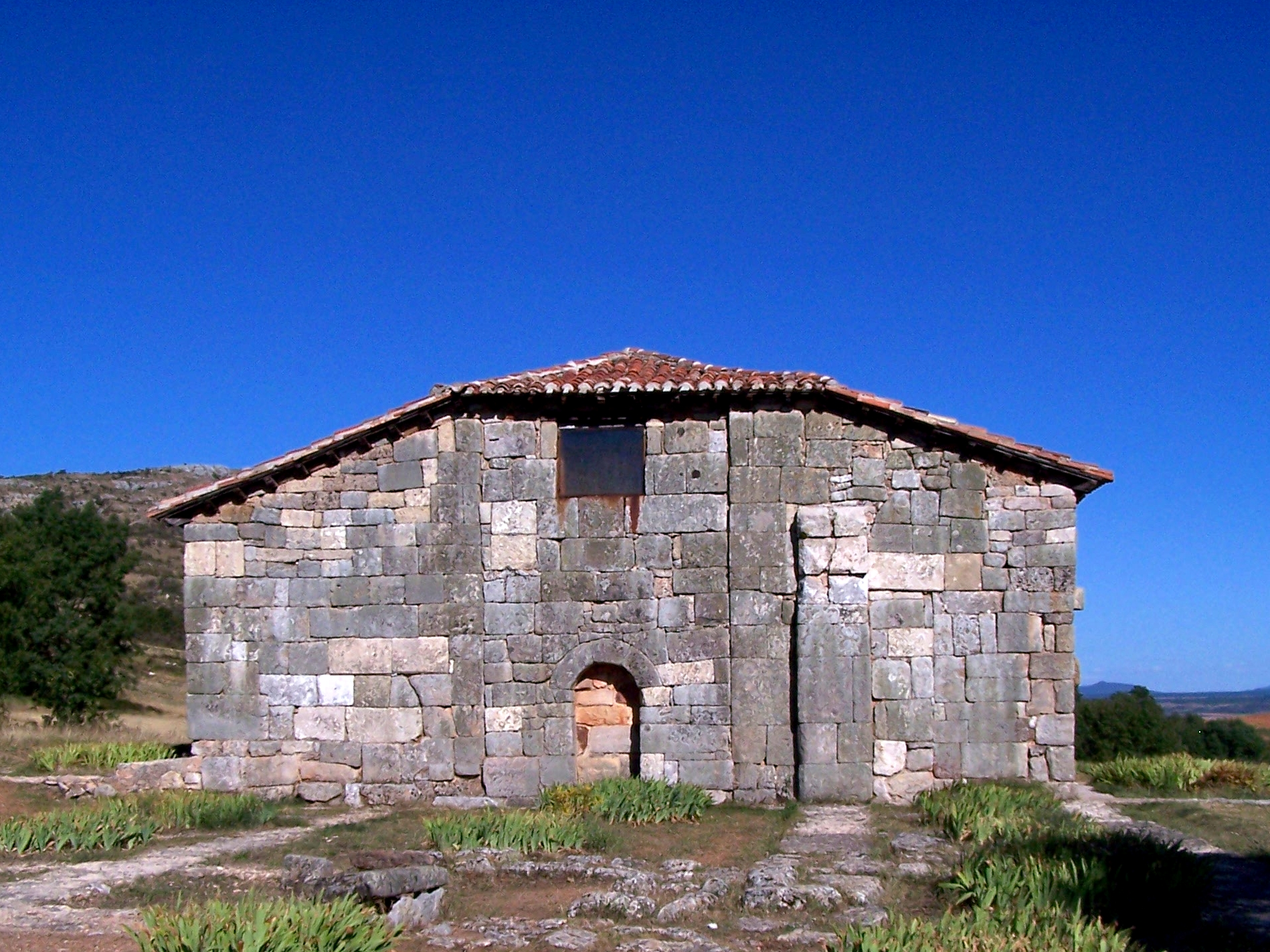
View from NW

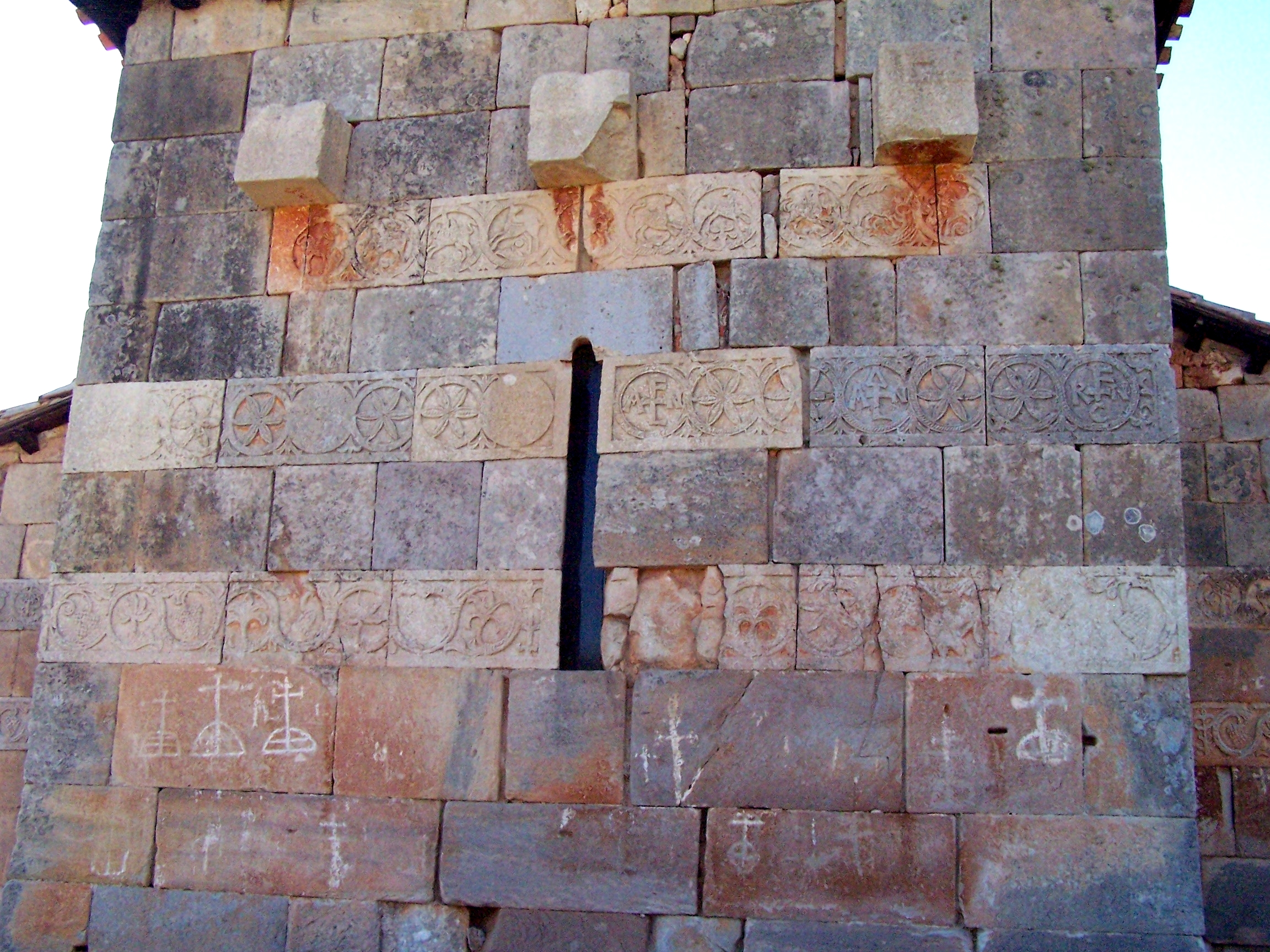
Apse wall, slit-shaped window

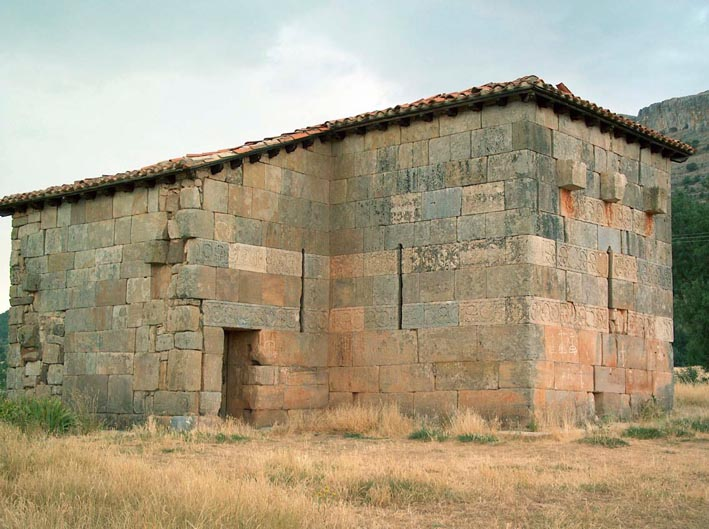
View from S with side door

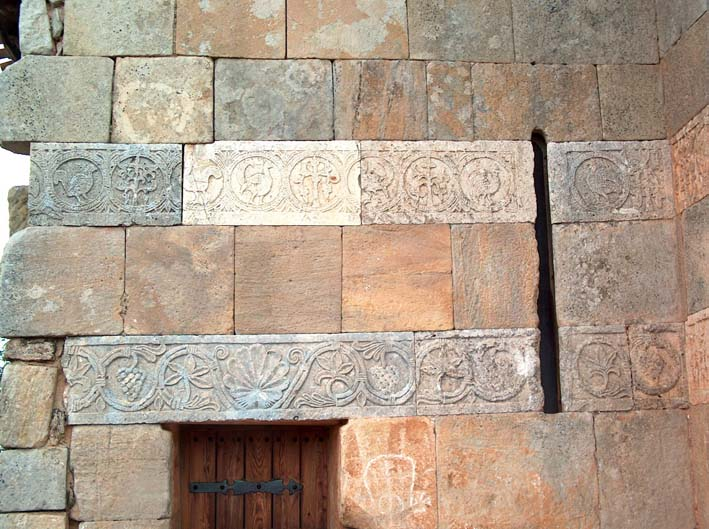
Detail: southern door, detail with carved friezes

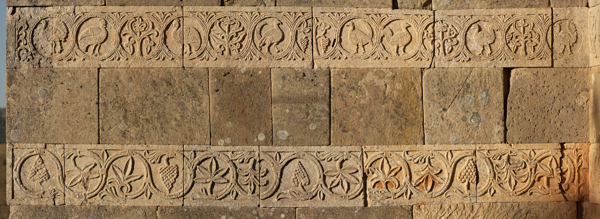
Frieze detail

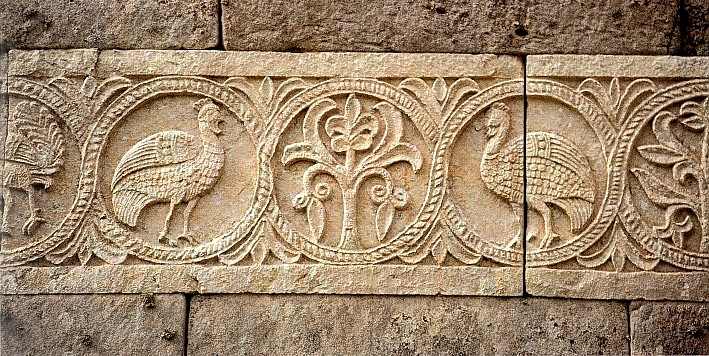
Frieze detail with birds

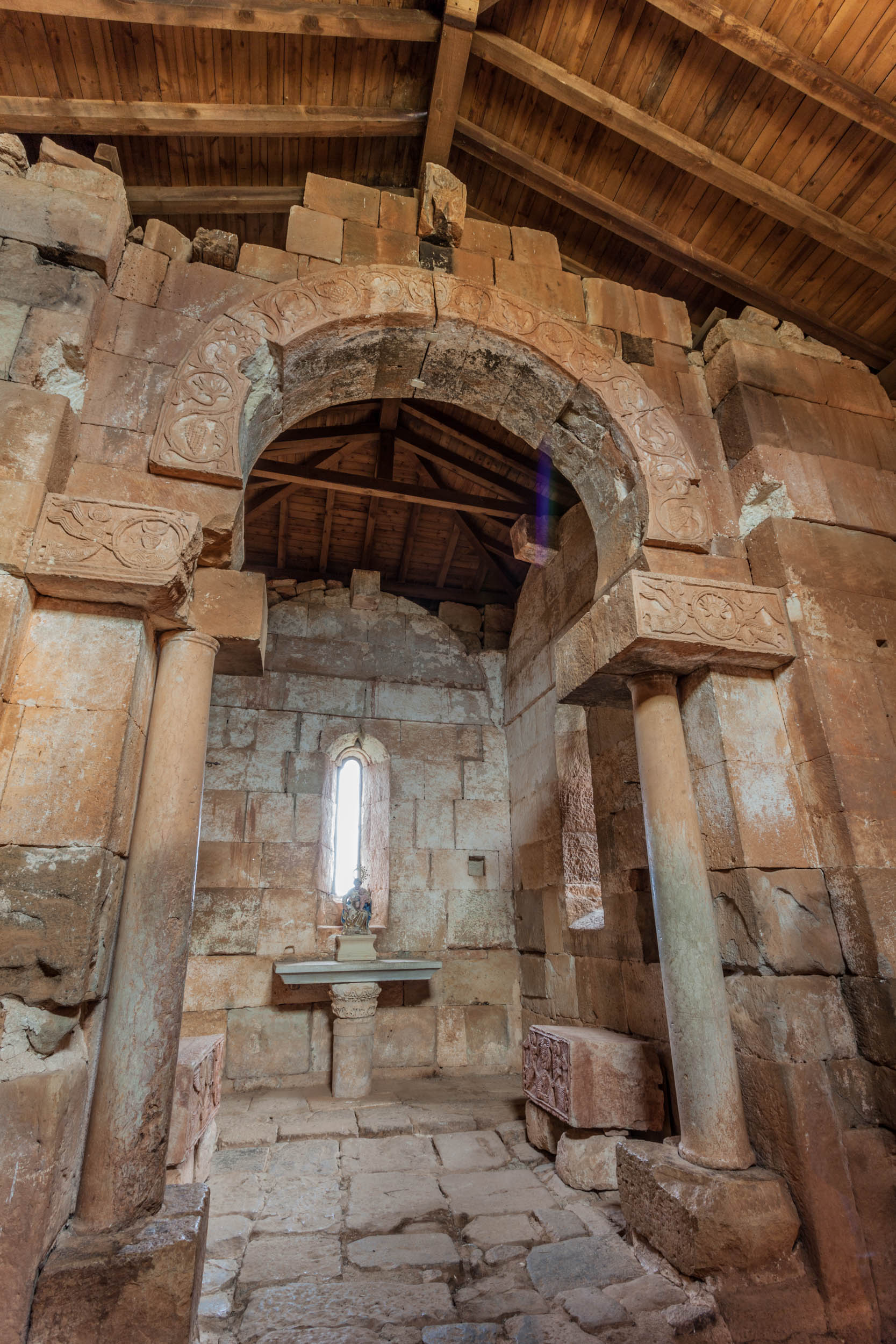
Triumphal arch and altar apse

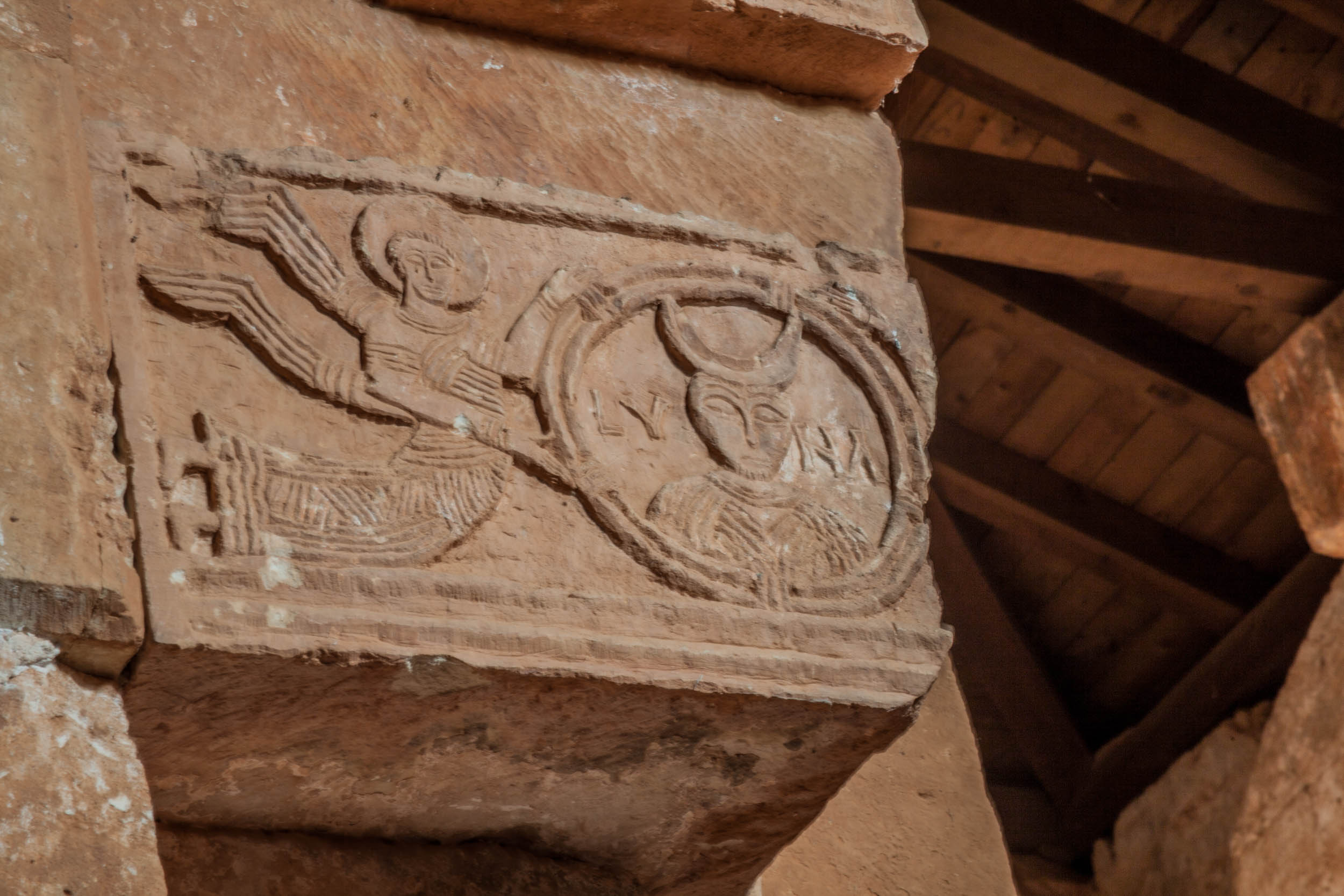
Interior: northern impost block of the triumphal arch with relief of LUNA (Moon)

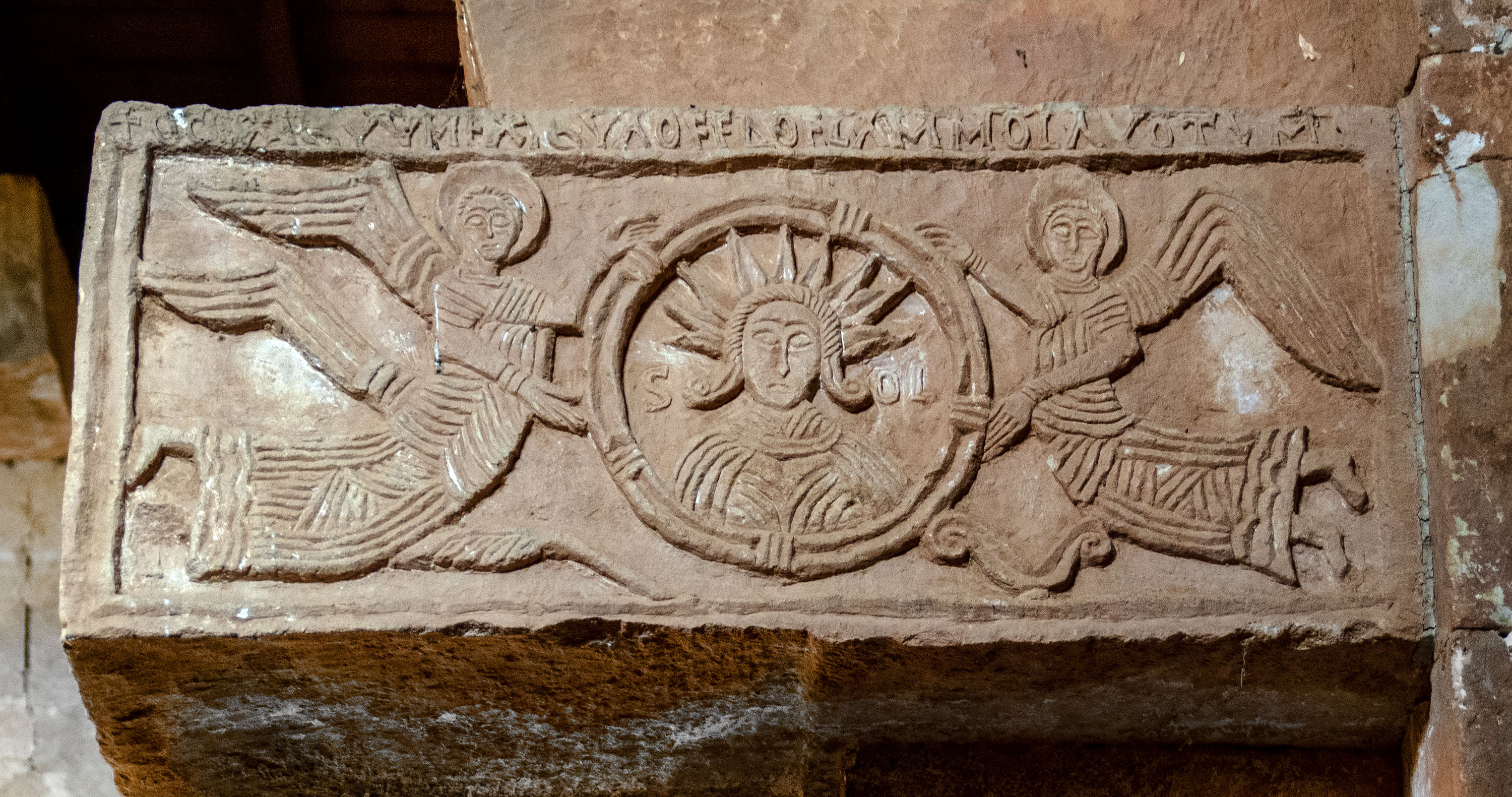
Interior: southern impost with relief of SOL (Sun)

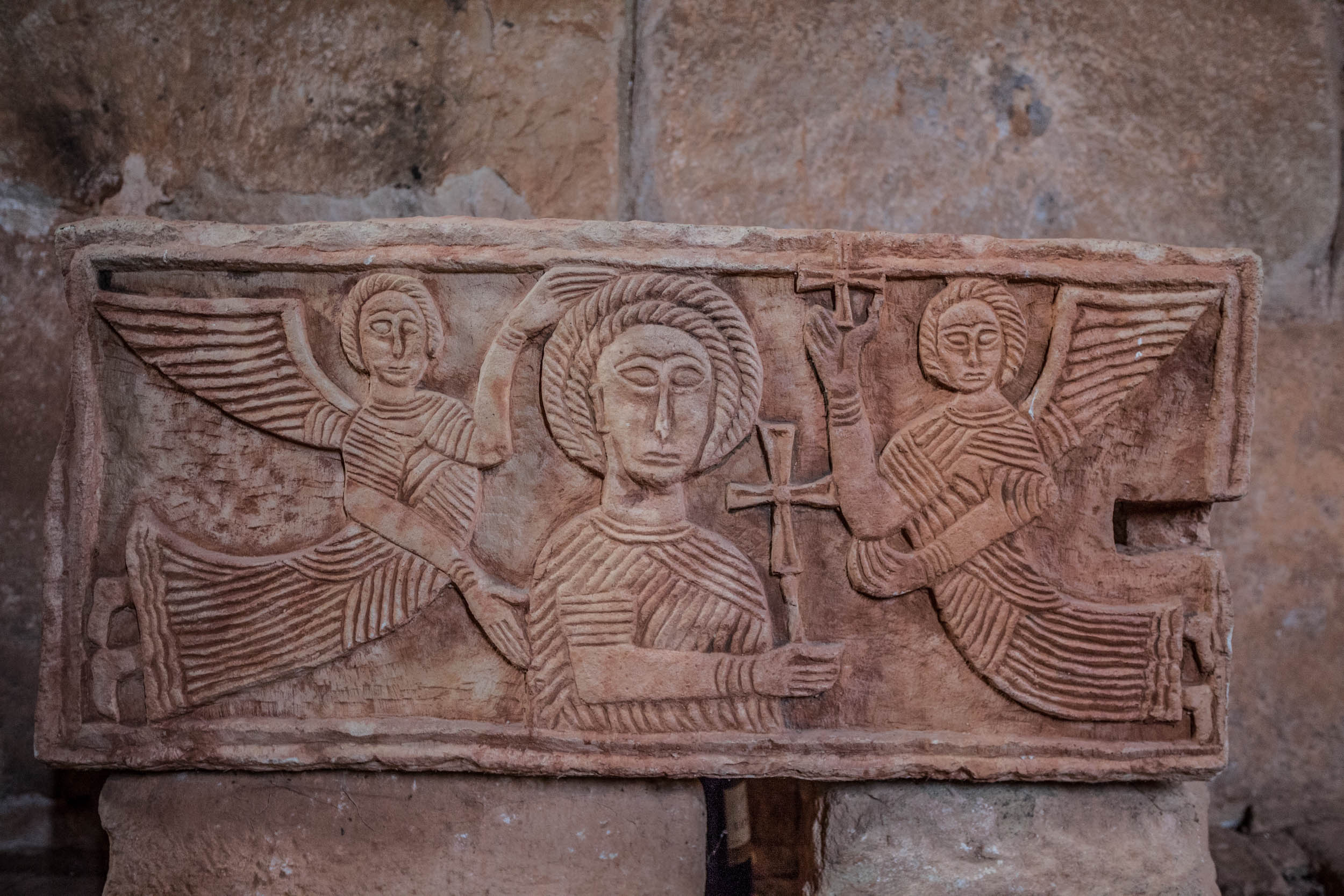
Interior: relief with haloed Jesus figure flanked by angels

== See also ==
- Iberian pre-Romanesque art and architecture
