= Parretas =

Parretas is a neighborhood in Braga. It was created in the late 1970s when the city started expanding to the peripheral zones.

== Etymology ==
The name Parretas is thought to be derived from porretas, a common name given to green stalks found in onions and leeks.

== History ==
In 1978, an architect cooperative from Porto released a proposal to the municipal government of Braga to create an urbanization plan for a 20-hectare agricultural area. At the time, Azevedo Campos Irmãos Limitada (ACIL) acquired it in plots in order to build the houses of its founding partners, all of which part of the Azevedo Campos family. José Pedro Campos, the oldest of the founders of the company, was the only one to reach the area in the 1960s; this household is still used as ICNF's regional headquarters.

The school went active in 1992. In January 1998, the municipal pool was finished, built by Sá Machado. A beach volleyball field was added to it in the 2017 season.

Contiguous to the school is Campo Polidesportivo das Parretas, refurbished in 2017.

The neighborhod also has its own association (Associação de Moradores das Parretas). A new directive took over in 2015, its first project being the creation of Parretas Team, a multi-sports facility for residents, used as means to combat social exclusion. Two years after its creation, it had already created boxing champions.

== Dispute ==
A dispute arose regarding what parish Parretas is located. In 1926, when it was still a rural area, it was part of Real, however, the subsequent urbanization was always managed by Sé. A 2005 agreement favored Real, but, as of 2007, was never applied, to an extent where both parishes announced a gentleman's agreement in February of that year. António Sousa was against the proposal; this was hotly contested by locals.

== Incidents ==
On the evening of 7 January 2026, a transforming substation exploded, causing a power outage in the Parretas area.

On the early hours of 27 January 2026, two PSP agents were assaulted by a drunk man, and were treated at the Braga Hospital.
