= Igreja de São Gião =

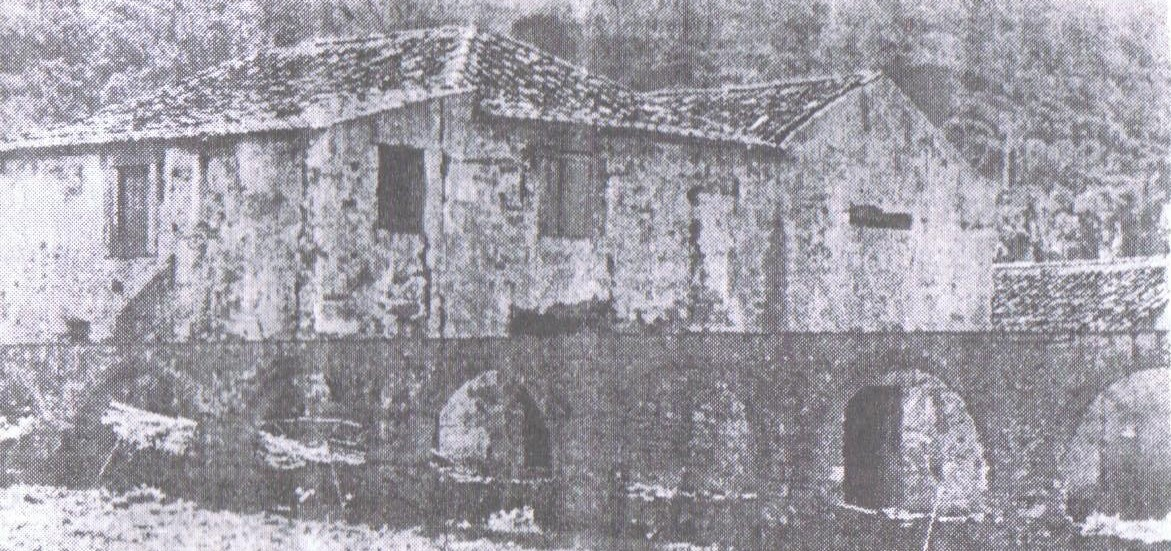
- Late 19th century photo of the church
- Interactive map of the Igreja de São Gião area

General information
- Architectural style: Asturian
- Location: Famalicão, Oeste region, Portugal
- Coordinates: 39°33′47″N 9°5′22″W

Igreja de São Gião is a medieval church in Famalicão, a parish of Nazaré, in the Oeste region of Portugal.

It was discovered by Eduíno Borges Garcia in 1961 and is regarded as one of the oldest temples in Portugal and the Iberian Peninsula. It is classified as a National Monument.

It was initially presumed to be built by the Visigoths (7th century), but more recent works have given it Asturian origins (10th century) due to its similarity to some Asturian temples.

== Gallery ==
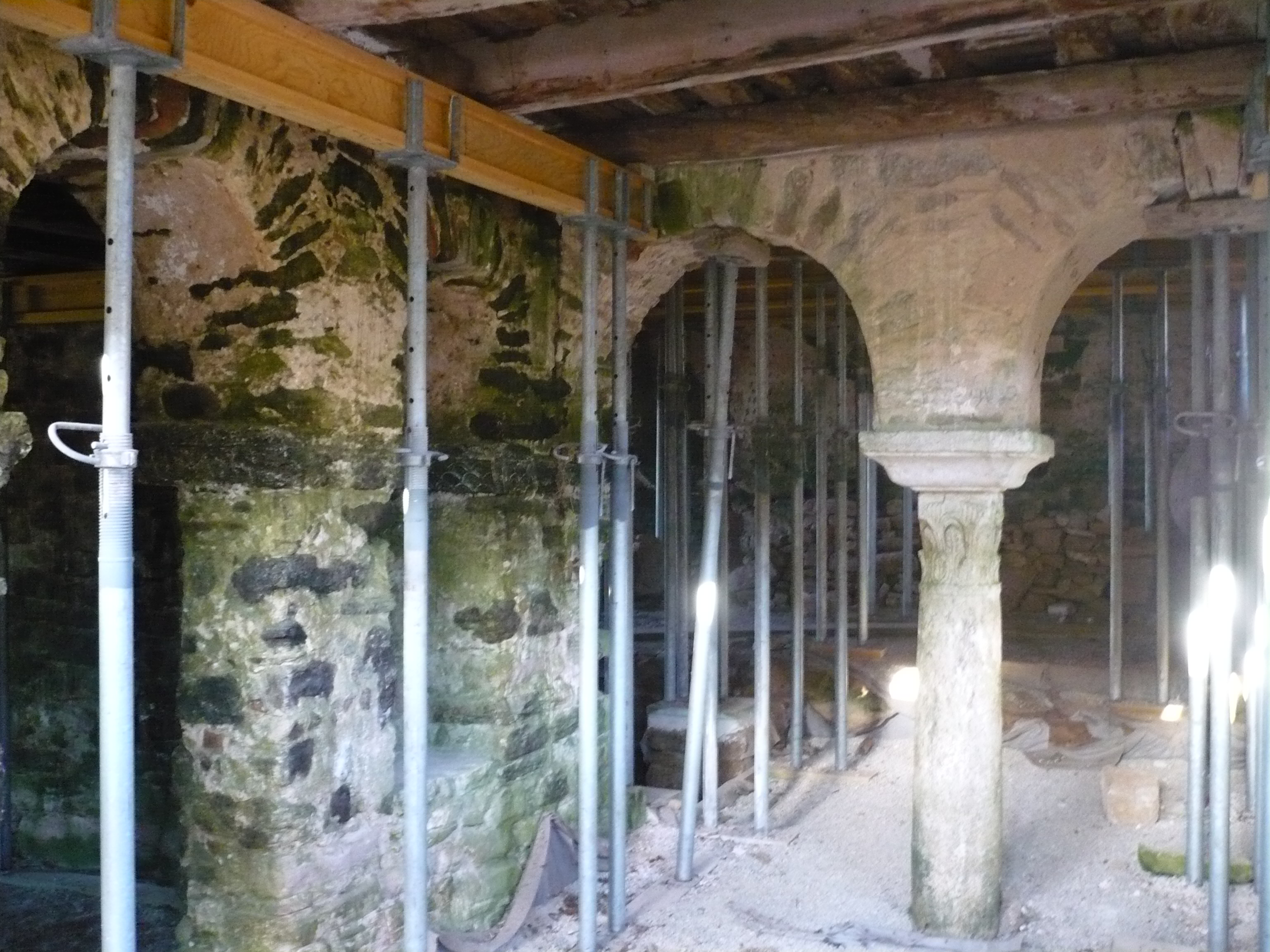

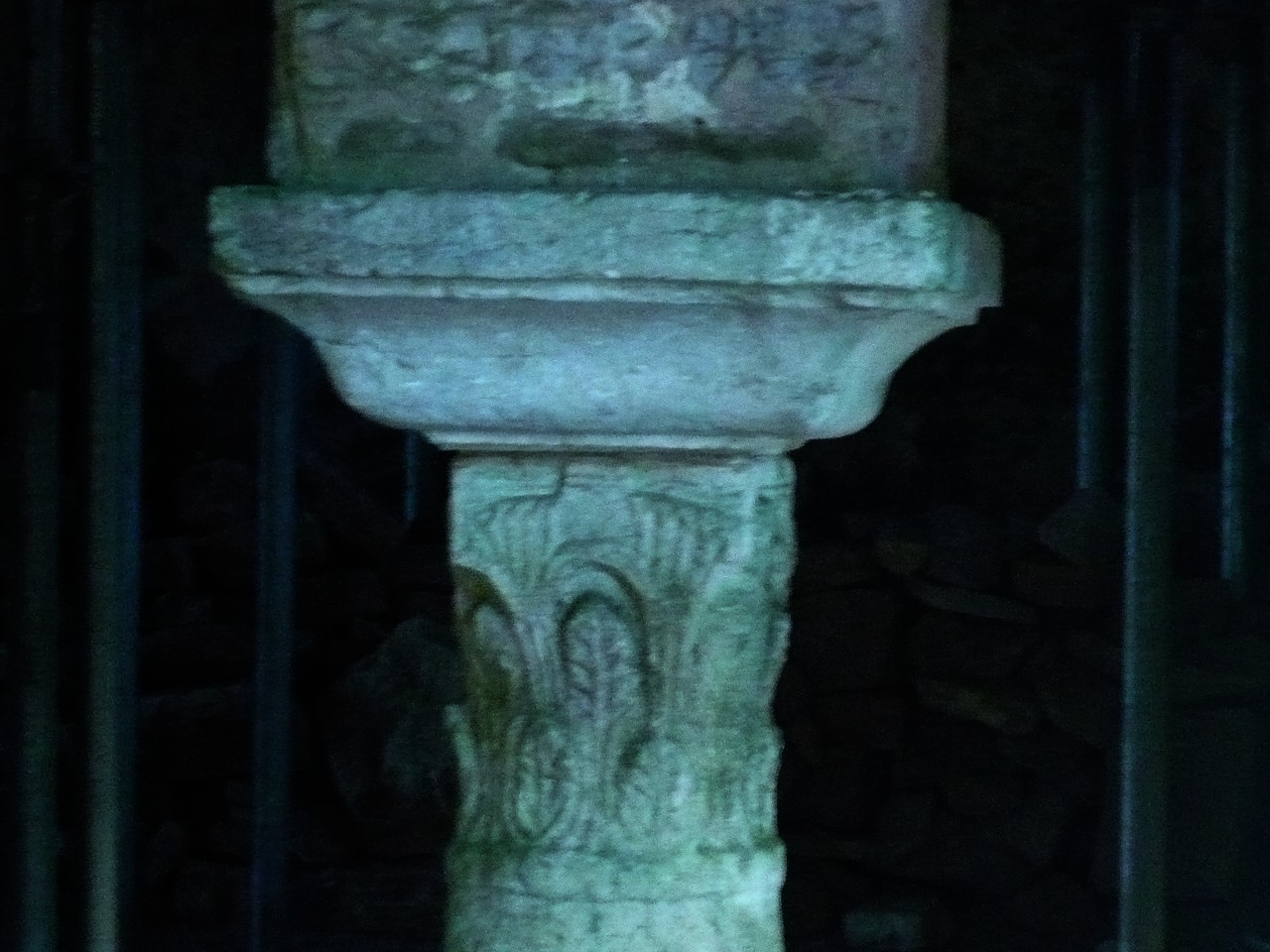

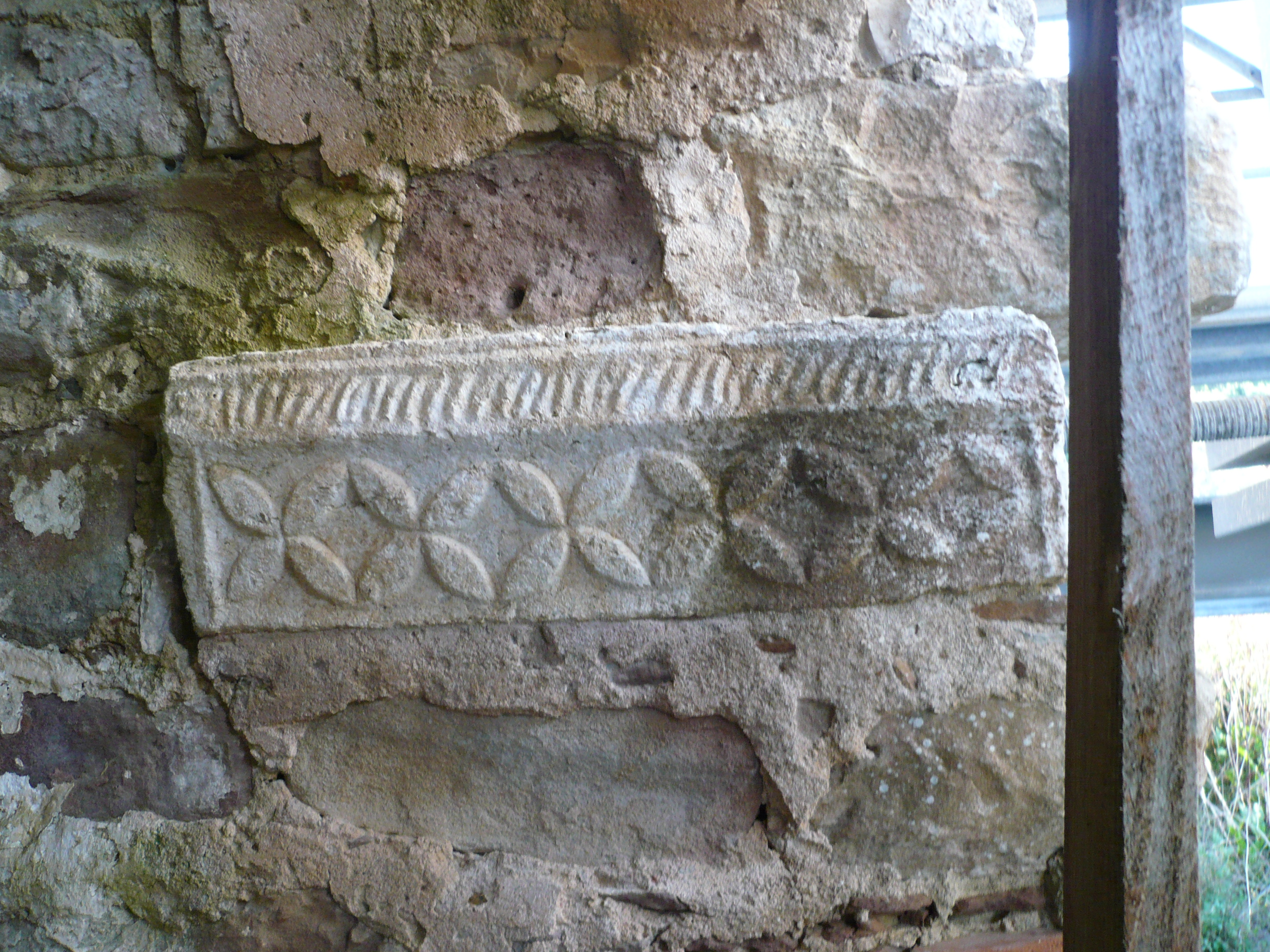

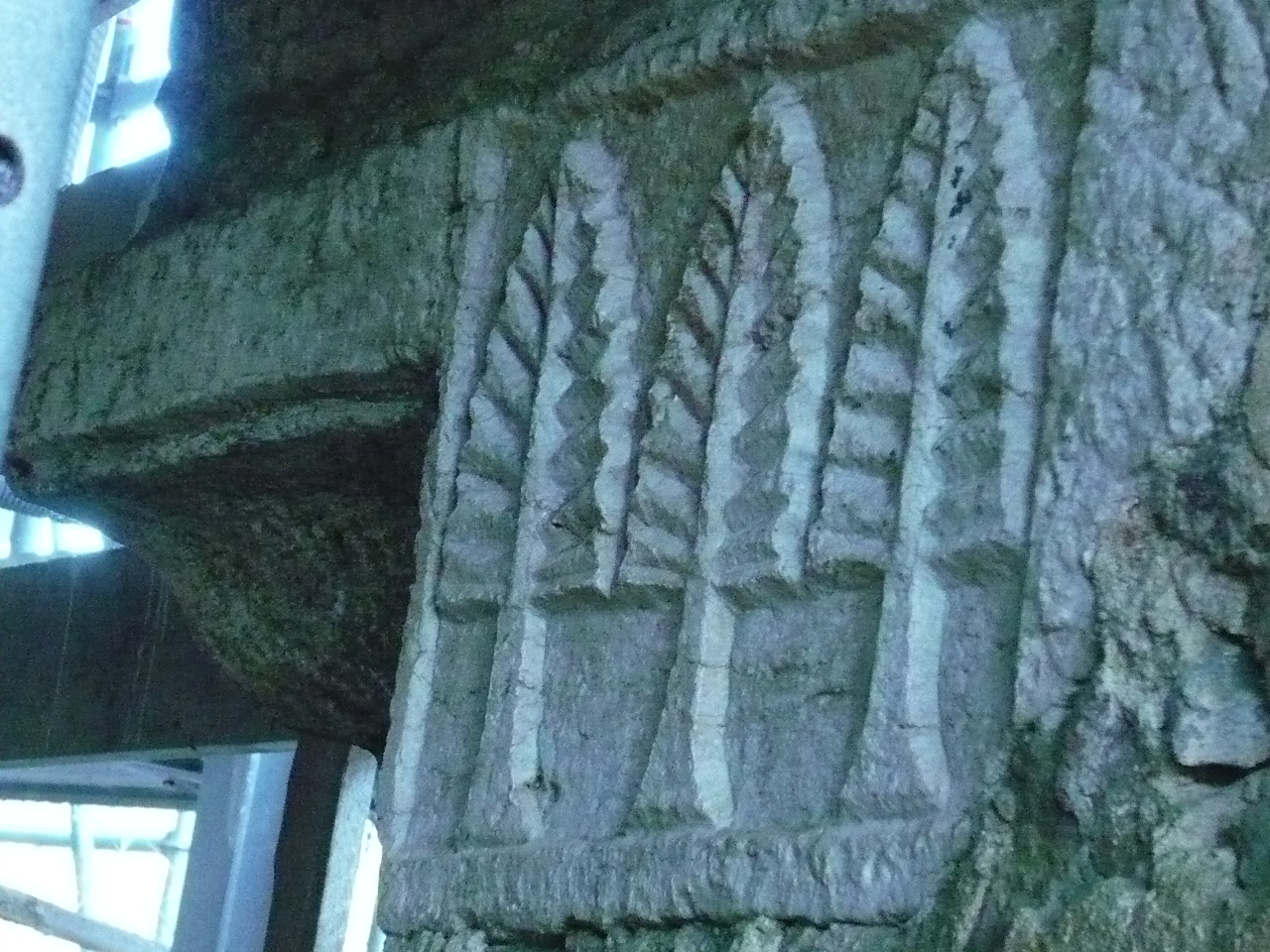

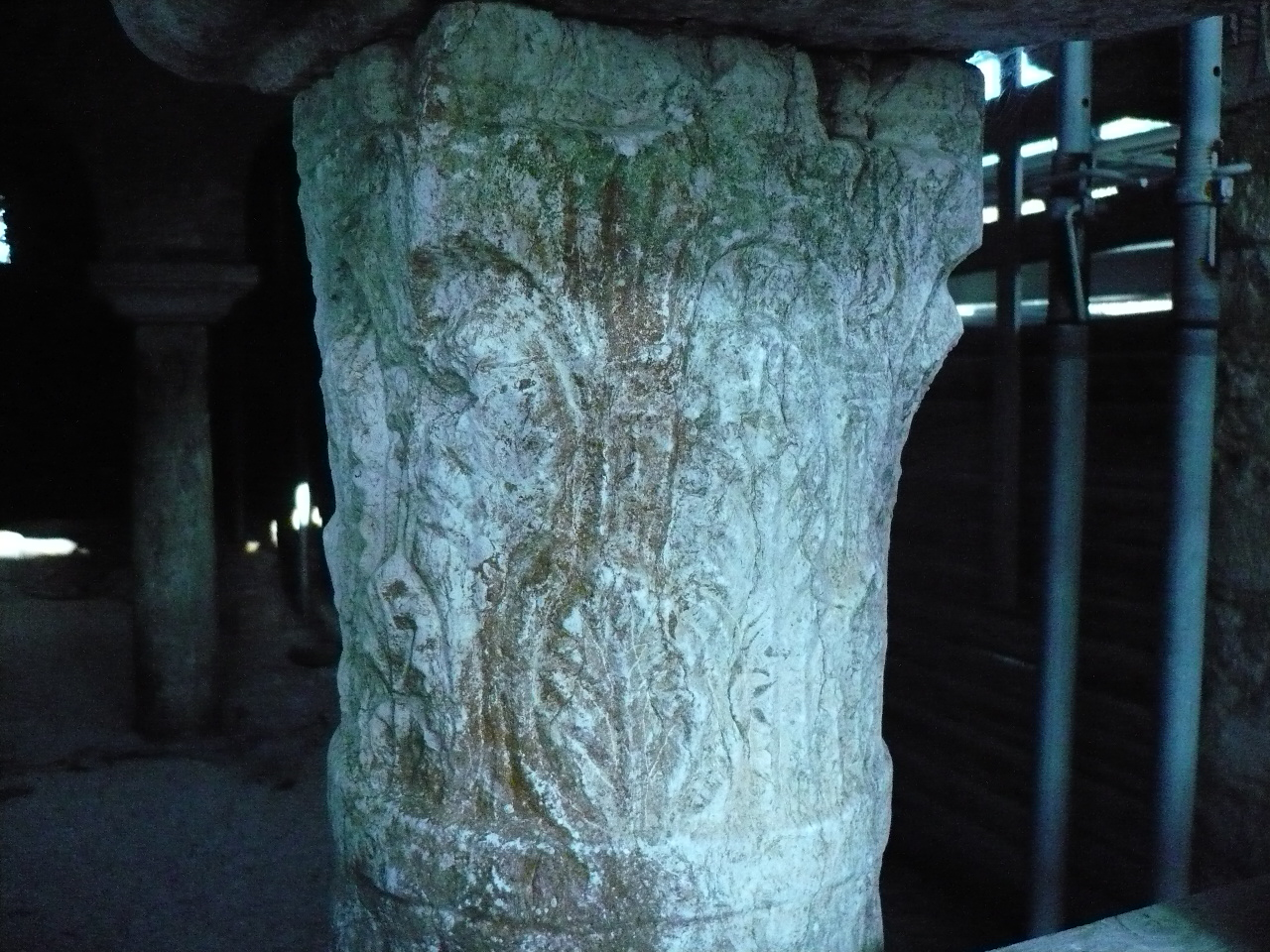
