= Iberian pre-Romanesque art and architecture =

Art of Spain and Portugal after the Classical Age

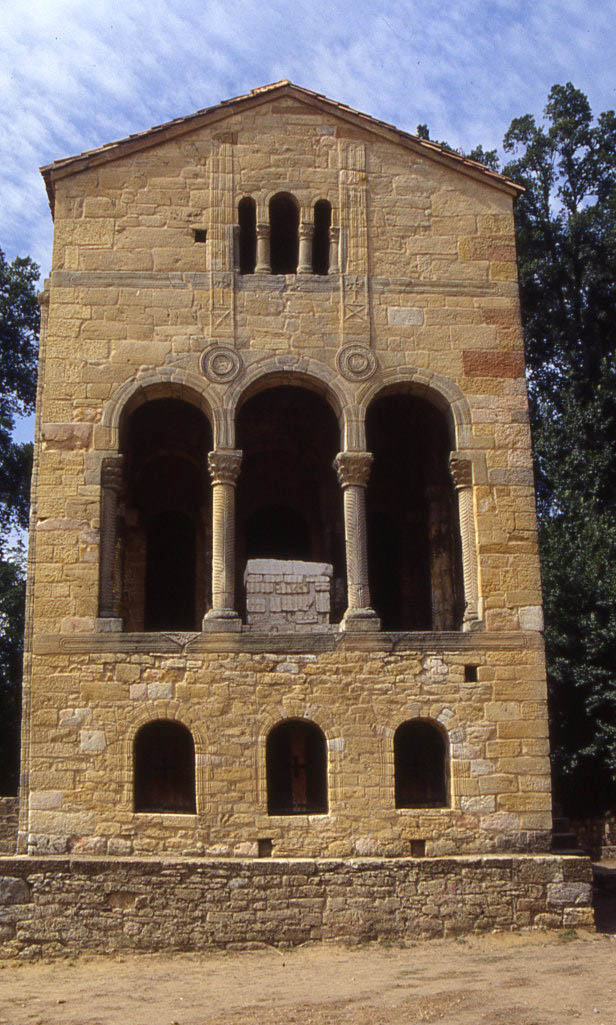
Church of Santa María del Naranco. Eastern façade. This is probably the finest example of Asturian architecture.

The pre-Romanesque art and architecture of the Iberian Peninsula (in Spanish, arte prerrománico; in Portuguese, arte pré-românica) refers to the art of Spain and Portugal after the Classical Age and before Romanesque art and architecture; hence the term Pre-Romanesque.

Visigothic art, the art of the Visigoths to 711, is usually classified as Migration Period art by art historians to emphasis its Germanic connections and origins; but can also classified as Pre-Romanesque, particularly in Spain, to emphasis its lineage in Spanish history.

== Styles ==
The main styles (based on chronological and geographic considerations) of the Iberian Pre-Romanesque were:

- Visigothic art and architecture
- Asturian art, the art of the Kingdom of Asturias from 718 through the 10th century.
- Mozarabic art, art of mixed Arab-Spanish heritage made by the Mozarabs, the Christians under the Islamic rule.
- Repoblación art and architecture (Spanish, arte de repoblación), art on the increasing Christian frontierlands. Most of the formerly called Mozarabic buildings receive nowadays also this denomination.

In Catalonia and Aragon, a style ancestral to the Romanesque developed early in parallel with the region of Lombardy and it has become common to refer the formerly called late Catalan Pre-Romanesque as "first Romanesque" after the suggestions of Josep Puig i Cadafalch.

== See also ==
- Croatian pre-Romanesque art and architecture
