= Chapel of São Frutuoso =

- Capela de São Frutuoso
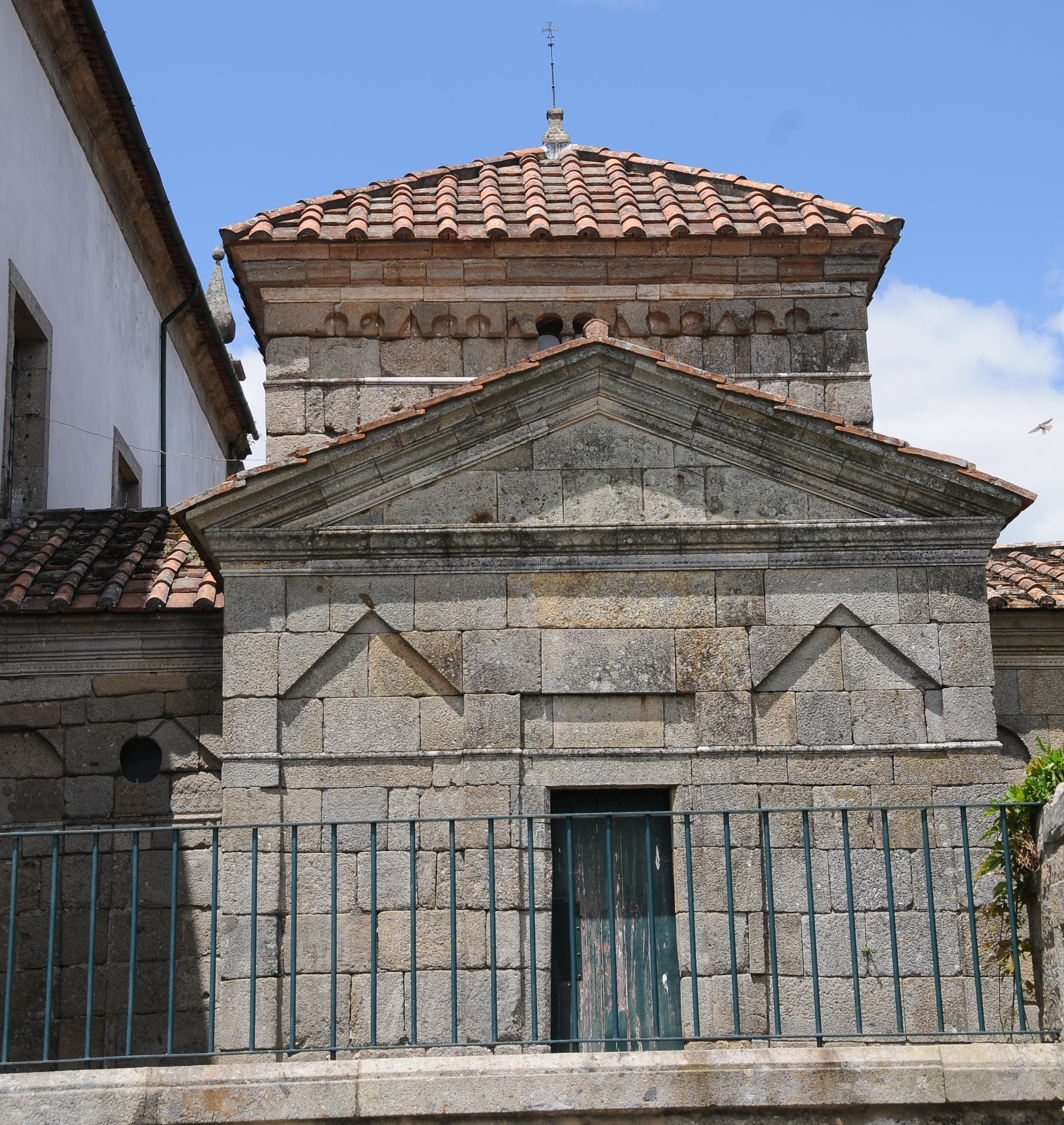
- The front façade of the Romanesque chapel of São Frutuoso alongside of the Church of São Salvador

General information
- Type: Chapel
- Architectural style: Visigothic
- Location: Real, Braga, Portugal
- Coordinates: 41°33′37″N 8°26′20″W
- Opened: 560 A.D.
- Owner: Portuguese Republic

Technical details
- Material: Granite

Design and construction
- Architect: Fructuosus of Braga

The Chapel of São Frutuoso (Portuguese: Capela de São Frutuoso), also known as the Chapel of São Frutuoso of Montélios (Portuguese: Capela de São Frutuoso de Montélios) or the Chapel of São Salvador of Montélios (Portuguese: Capela de São Salvador de Montélios), is a pre-Romanesque chapel in the civil parish of Real, municipality of Braga. It is part of group of religious buildings that include the Royal Church, and originally built by the Visigoths in the 7th century, in the form of a Greek cross. Since 1944, it has been classified as a National Monument (Portuguese: Monumento Nacional).

== History ==
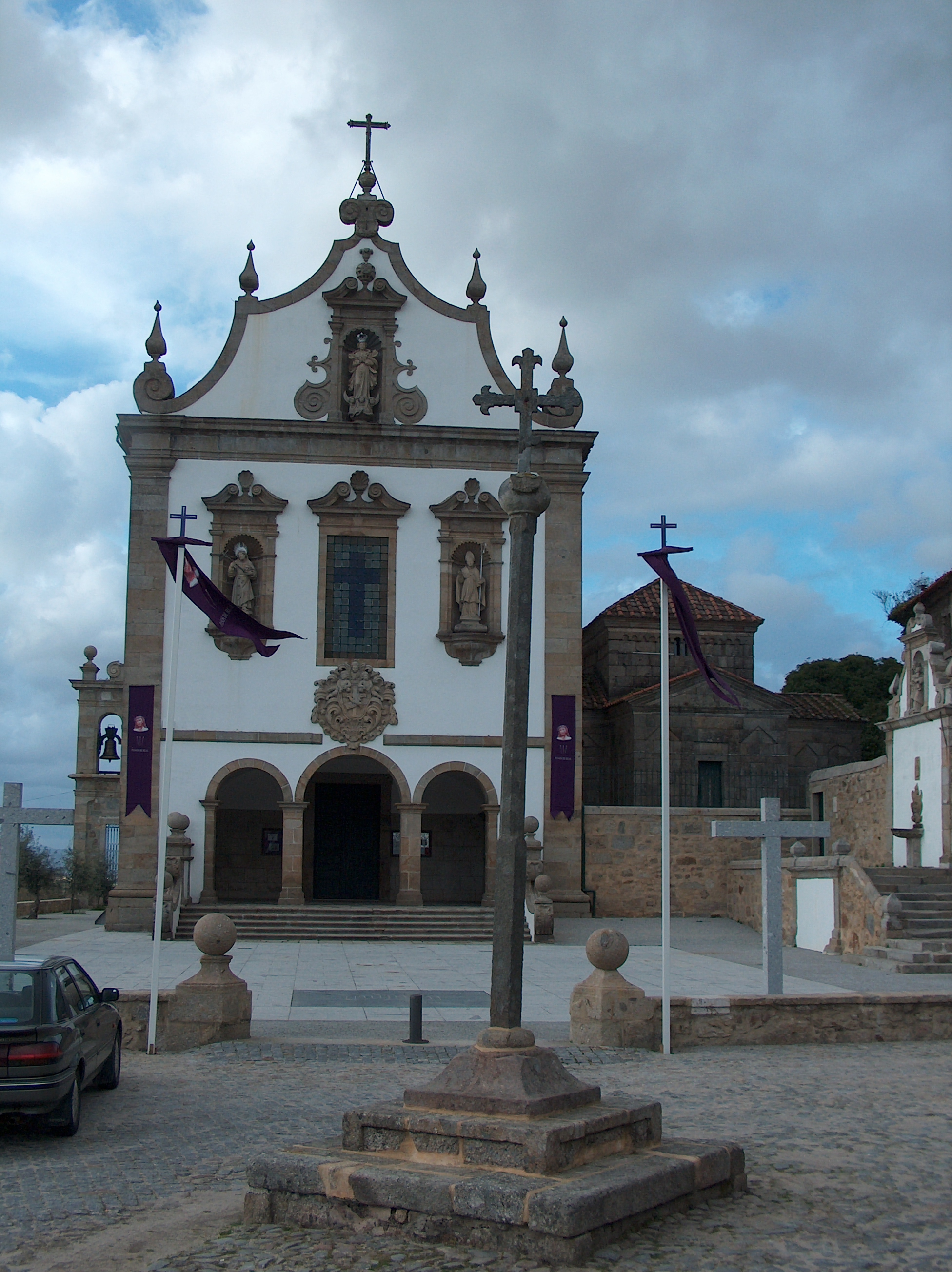
The Church of São Francisco and the lateral Chapel of São Frutuoso, with dependencies associated with the Monastery of São Salvador, as seen from the square

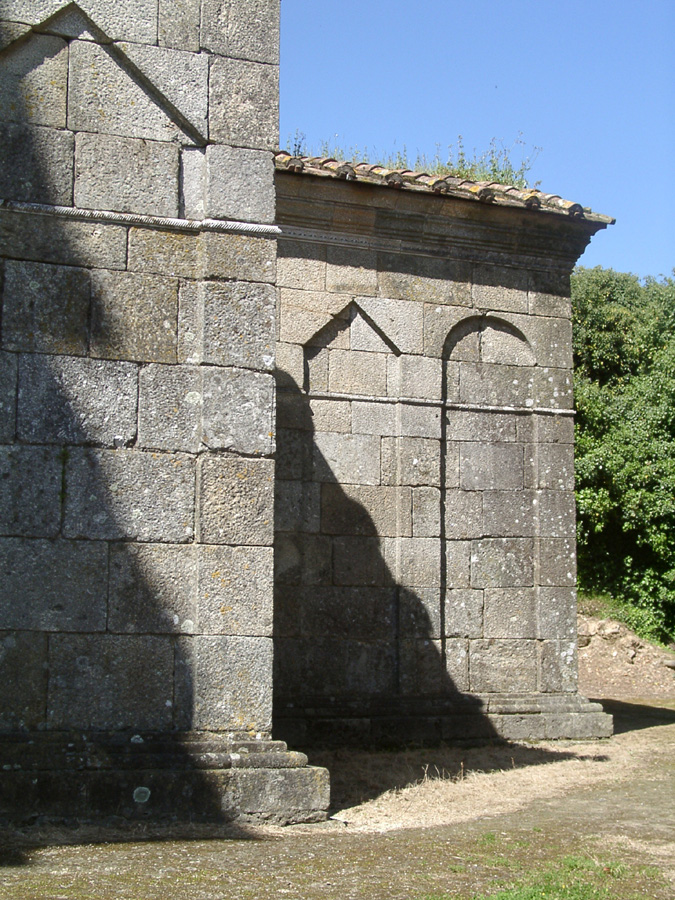
The alternating exterior angular and rounded frieses on the southwest corner of the Chapel

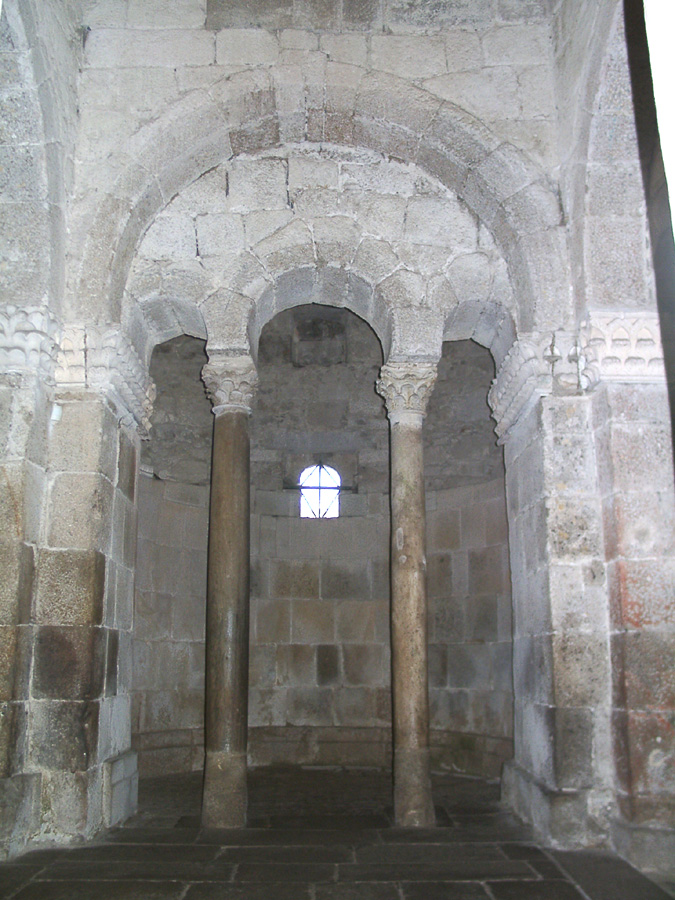
The triple horseshoe-shaped arch division between the arms of the Chapel

Based on historical accounts, and oral tradition, the site of the chapel was (around 560 A.D.) the location of a small Roman villa and, likely, a temple dedicated to the god Asclepius.

In 656, Fructuosus of Braga, then Bishop of Bracara, founded on this site the Monastery of São Salvador, ordering the construction of the chapel, as his tomb. In the biography of his life, São Valerius confirms as much, mentioning that the saint who founded the convent was buried there (between 665 and 666).

In the 9th-10th century, the chapel was reconstructed and redecorated. From a document dated in 883, the chapel was reconsecrated to São Salvador, also affirming the original construction to between 656 and 665.

Around the 12th century, following the Reconquista from the Arabs, with the revival of the Christian community and affinity for Saint Frutuoso of Braga, a cult to the saint was begun. In 1102, the Archbishop of Santiago de Compostela, D. Diogo Gelmires, transferred the mortal remains of Frutuoso to Compostela.

In 1523, Archbishop D. Diogo de Sousa founded the Franciscan convent of the Order of the Capuchos da Piedade, alongside the chapel of São Frutuoso, likely destroying the older Monastery of São Salvador.

From notes by friar Manuel de Monforte (in 1696), in his Crónica da Província da Piedade (Chronicle of the Province of Piedade), the chapel "is in [the shape of a cross] with all sides equal; whose points form four chapels, whose walls close in a half-circle. One of the chapels, which one can call the foot of the cross, serves as the entrance where the door is; another which rightly corresponds to this one, as the head of the cross, serves as the principal chapel, or where the altar is; in the other two, which are the arms, are the two collateral altars; having both about 17 palms, and half a square, in this so small space this church has 24 columns: four at the main entrance to the door, six in each collateral chapel, and eight in the main of all...".

In 1728, by order of Archbishop D. Rodrigo de Moura Teles, the beginnings of a reconstruction and remodelling of the Convent of São Francisco's Church is undertaken, with the chapel of São Frutuoso integrated into the Church. From this point forward, the Chapel is accessible from the main Church, owing to significant alterations; this changes include, the destruction of the main façade, the modification of the eastern and western arms of the Latin cross-design; and alterations to the internal columns, including changes to the baldachins.

It was architect Ernest Korrodi who first promoted the recuperation of the original plan for the chapel (in 1897), publishing a small note entitled "Um Monumento Latino-Bizantino em Portugal" (A Latin-Byzantine Monument in Portugal). More than a century would pass, before João de Moura Coutinho e Sousa Lobo would begin to restore the original plan in 1931. The architect followed the original hypothesis that the chapel was ordered constructed by Fructuosus of Braga as his 6th century tomb, following a model/design aesthetic based on the mausoleum Galla Placidia in Ravenna. This redesign was followed by the DGEMN reconstruction of cupola and roof in 1939, again in 1941, repairs in 1958, that included the reconstruction of the walls, door, plastering of the cupola and several projects around the churchyard. In 1961, the pavement, main arch, reconstruction of the staircase and consolidation of the vaulted ceiling were undertaken, followed by conservation projects in 1966. Similar repairs were undertaken in 1970 (repair and cleaning of the roof), in 1973 (checking of the rood, repairs, painting conservancy and arrangement of the area around the chapel), in 1984 (arrangement of the roof and paintings) and in 1987 (new projects evolving conservancy).

== Architecture ==
The chapel is situated on the eastern lateral façade of the church of the Convent of São Francisco, below the level of the latter. While access to the interior of the chapel is made from the church, its original exterior access was made from through a small enclosed courtyard and gates. East of the chapel are the ruins of the old convent and its dependencies, in addition to the Fountain of Santo António (Portuguese: Fonte de Santo António) which is further below these buildings. To the southeast, the old granite pavement leads to the Quinta do Lago (Estate of the Lake) and the Escola Primária de Real (Primary School of Real) to the west.

The chapel of São Frutuoso continues to be an enigma, but it is a uniquely rare example of Visigothic structures in Portugal, based on a Greek-cross, which may have followed the design of a Byzantine mausoleum comparable to the Galla Placidia, in Ravenna.

The church is laid out in a Greek cross design, with a rectangular exterior, and semi-circular interior arms (to the north, south and east). From the exterior, the main volume of the chapel is surmounted by a tower-like cupola and cross, with the roof covered in rounded tiles. The limestone walls are surmounted by edged cornices, preceded by frieses, also in limestone, in the shape of rope, semi-circles, six-pointed rosettas and fleur-de-lis. The collateral façades are decorated with blind arcades, alternating between angular and double rounded-frieses, which are repeated in the tower cupola, and intersected by small round windows. The principal façade, which was the main entrance at one time, is highlighted by a grand arch portico, preceded by staircase. In northern part of the eastern arm of the chapel is an arcosolium, where the mortel remains of Saint Fructuosus was originally entombed, and exposed to the exterior.

=== Interior ===
The inner masonry walls are defined by round arches, supported by large pillars, above which are large decorated friezes, with triple horseshoe-shaped arches, and a larger central arch. The chapel's arms are crossed in the middle of the wall by a narrow ribbon of limestone. While the interior arms are supported by wooden joists, the interior part of the hemispherical dome is plastered and painted white. The granite floor slabs are inscribed with coat of arms, and preceded from the main church by a staircase to the lower chapel.

== See also ==
- Early medieval domes
