= Visigothic art and architecture =

Art of the Visigoths

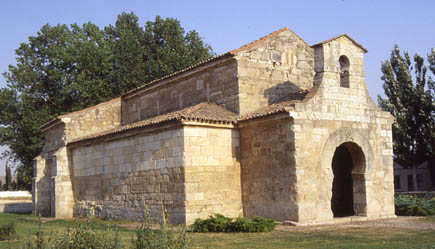
7th century Church of San Juan Bautista in Baños de Cerrato, Spain

The Visigoths entered Hispania (modern Spain and Portugal) in 415 and became the dominant people there until the Umayyad conquest of Hispania of 711 brought their kingdom to an end.

This period in Iberian art is dominated by their style. Visigothic art is generally considered in the English-speaking world to be a strain of Migration art, while the Portuguese- and Spanish-speaking worlds generally classify it as Pre-Romanesque.

Branches of Visigothic art include architecture, crafts (especially jewellery), and the Visigothic script.

== Visigothic art ==
Early Visigothic art survives in functional items, especially those of personal adornment. The art of the Visigoths in Iberia featured vibrant colours, geometrical patterns and stylized figures. The style was influenced by the local roman traditions, Byzantine art and Germanic metalworking techniques. Visigothic art was typically connected to items of physical use, such as belt buckles, brooches and pendants.

=== Gallery ===
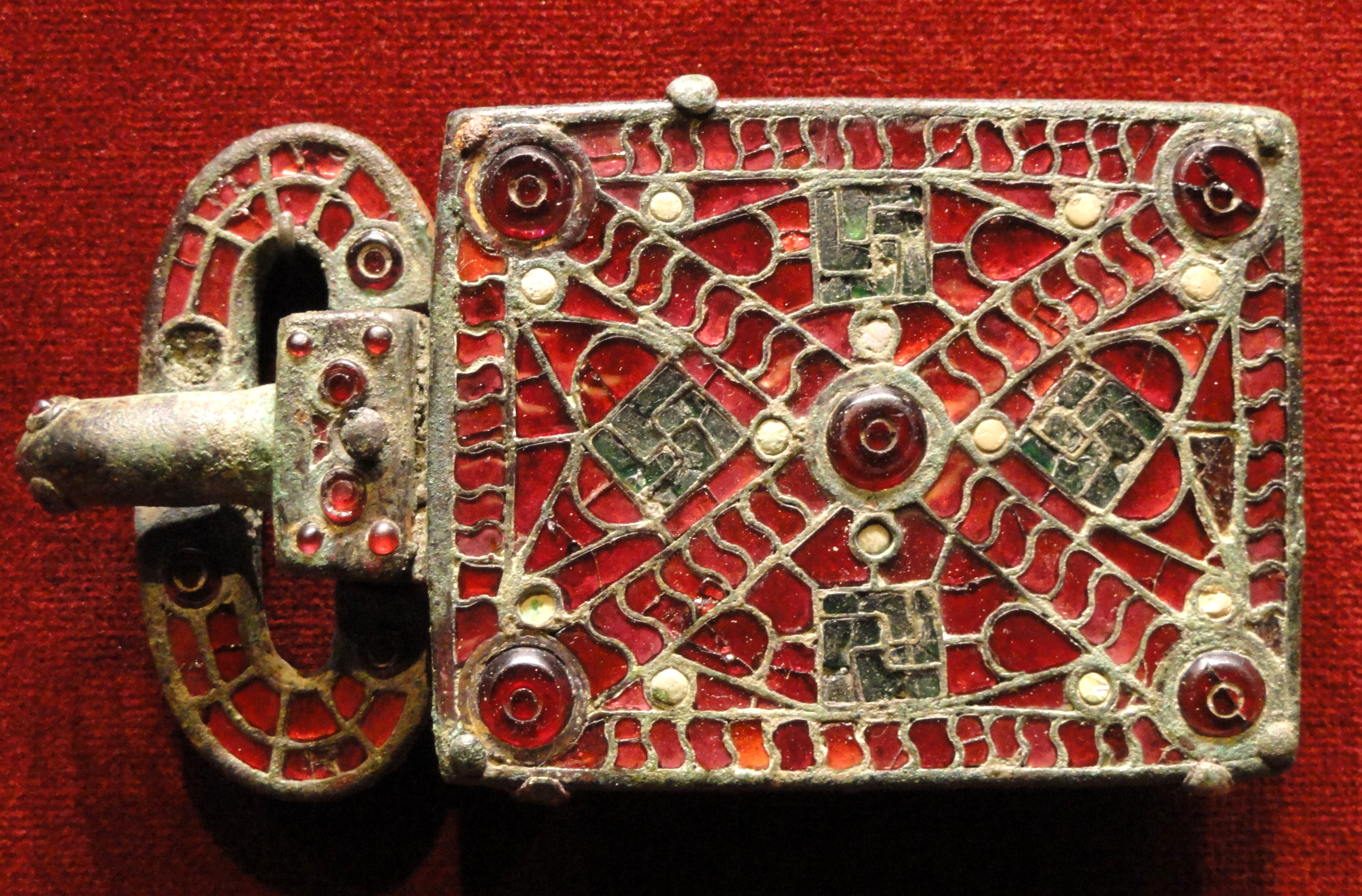
Belt buckle, c. 520-560 CE

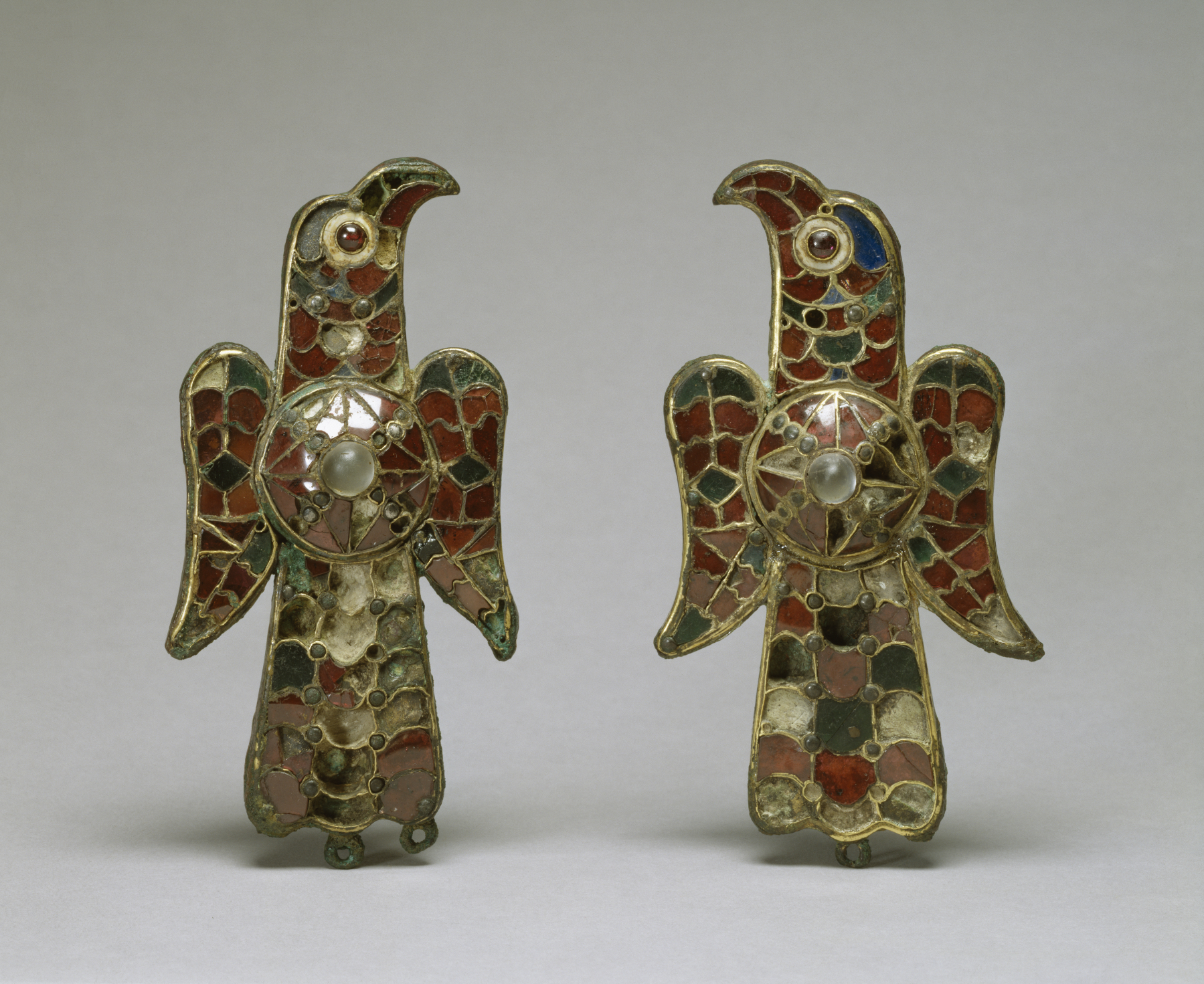
Pair of Eagle Fibula, 6th century

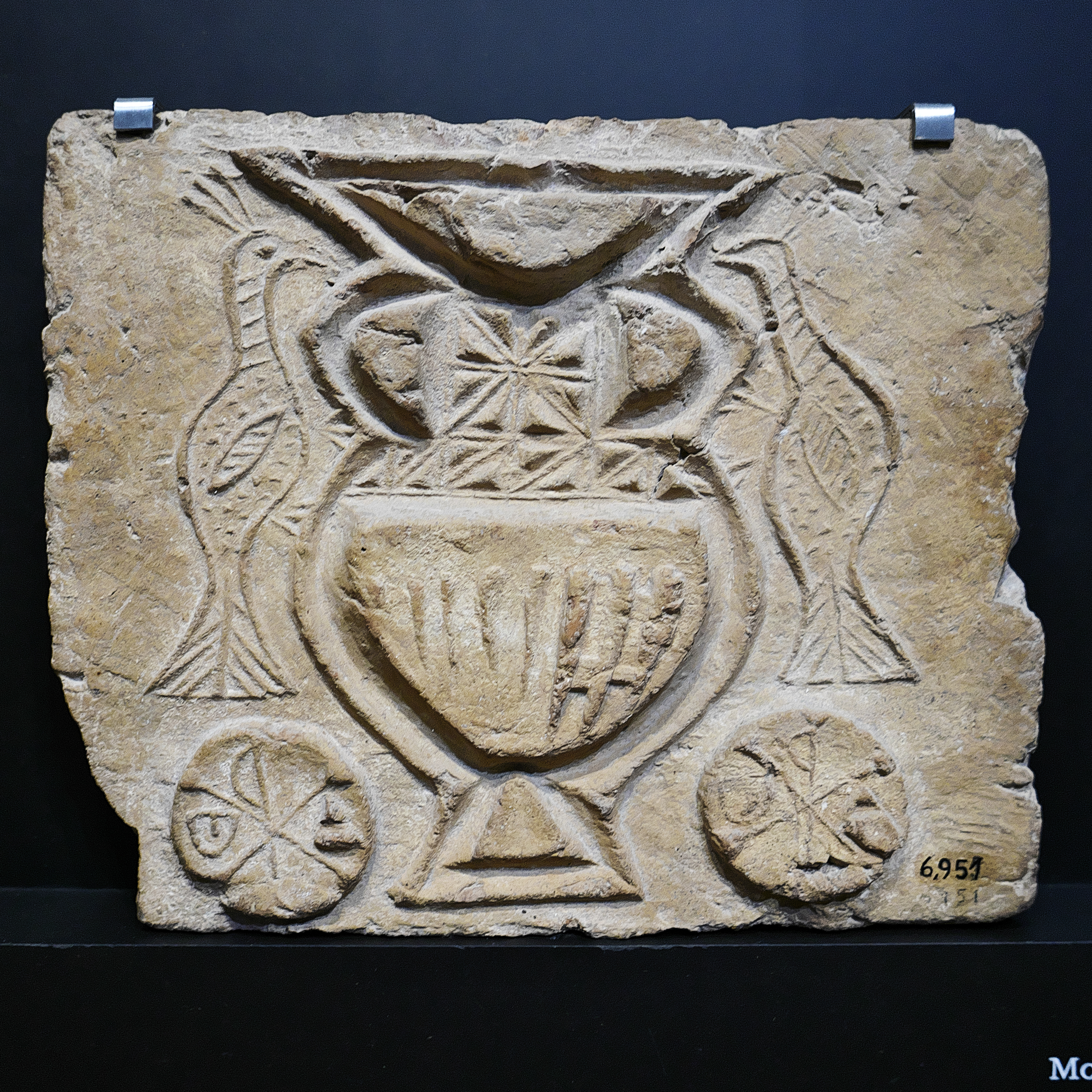
Ceramic decorated plate, 7th century

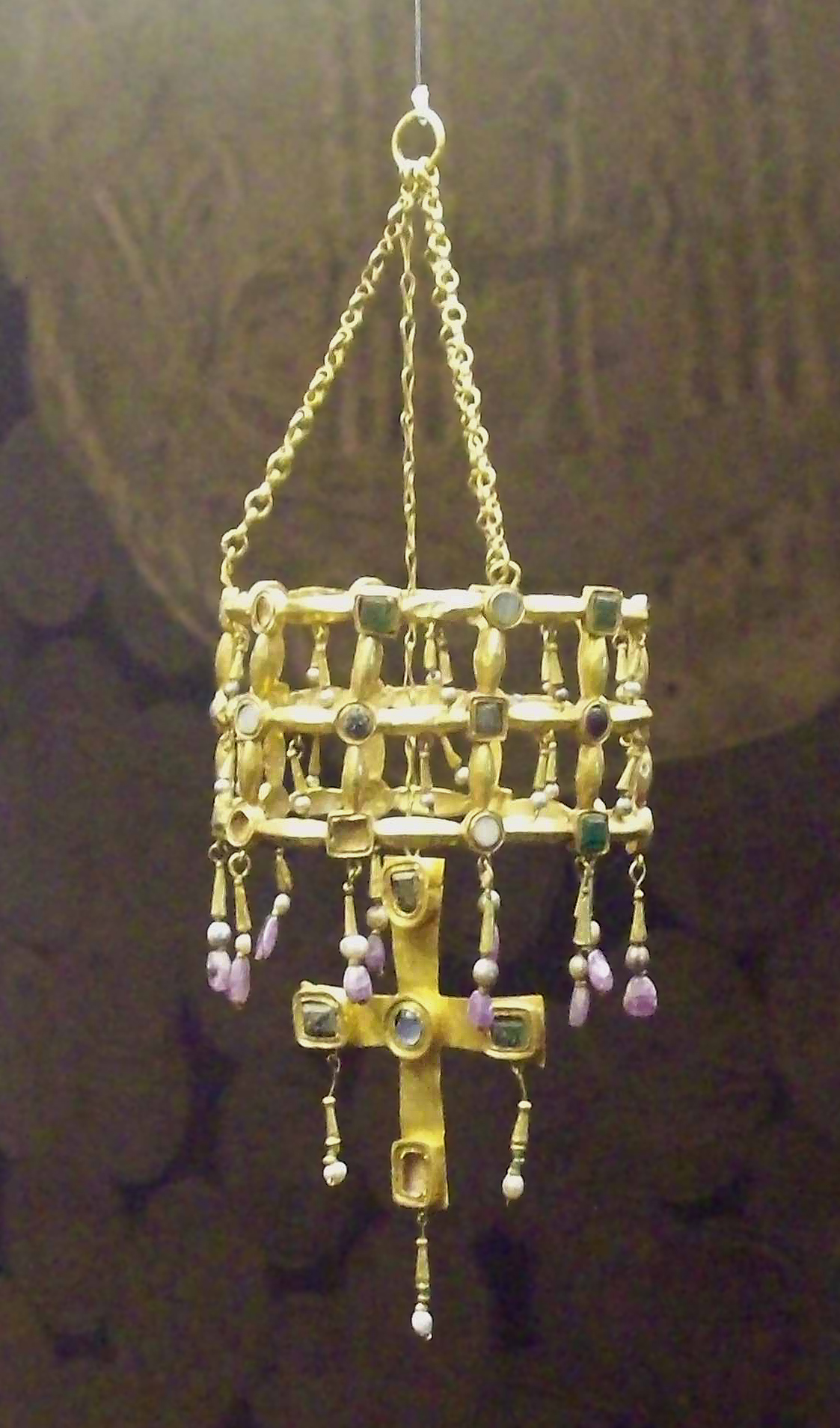
Visigothic votive crown

== Visigothic architecture ==
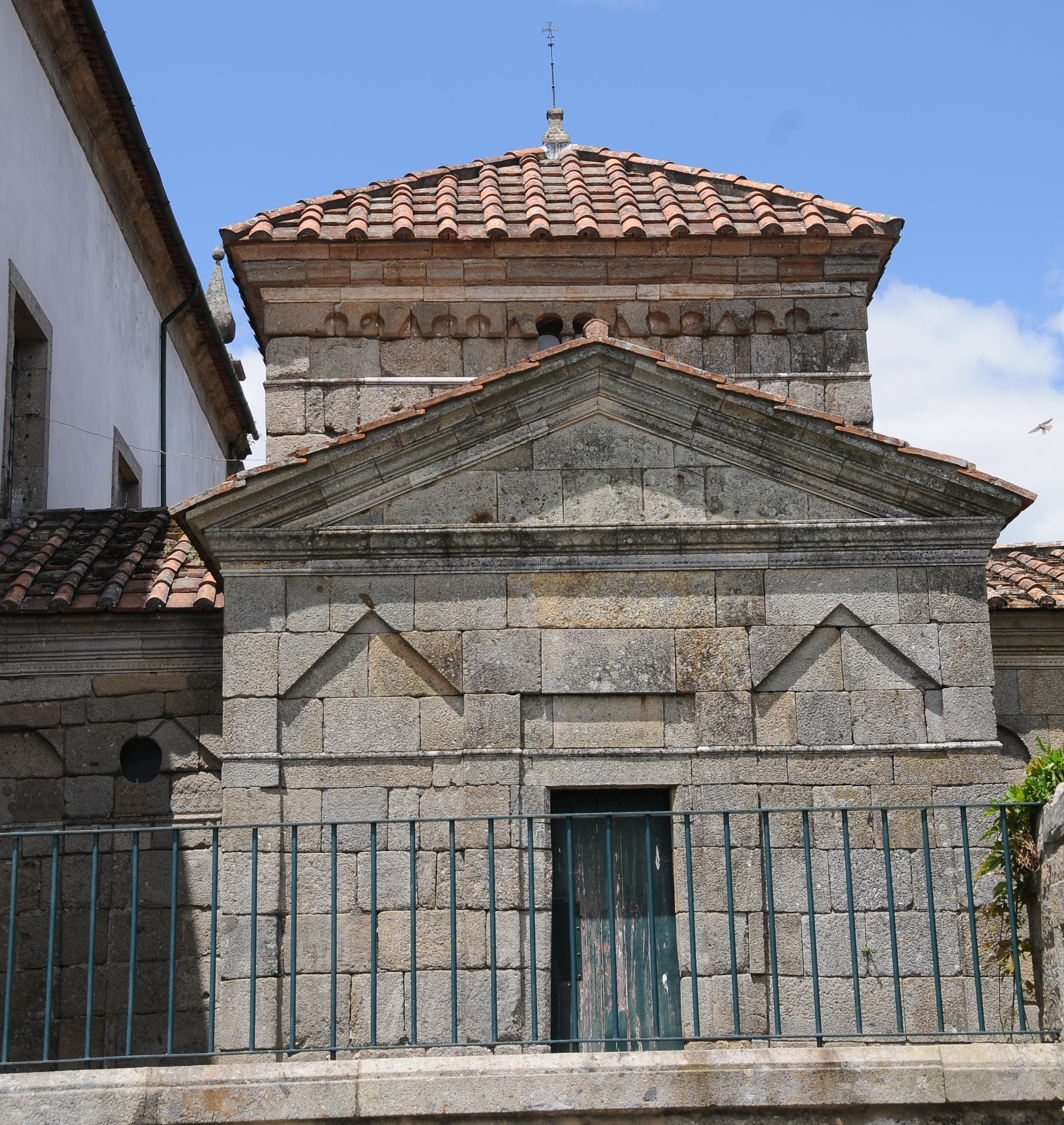
Chapel of São Frutuoso in Braga, Portugal

Visigothic architecture reflects the roots of late antiquity and early Christian architecture. The Visigoths gradually occupied Gaul and the Iberian Peninsula from the 5th to the 6th century. During the 6th century, they created a stable state entity, which reached its peak in the second half of the 7th century. The brief Byzantine occupation between 554 and 626 of the southeastern region (Provincia Spaniae) of the Iberian Peninsula strengthened relations with the Byzantine Empire, the Mediterranean Sea, and North Africa.

From the conversion of the Visigothic king Reccared I to the Orthodox (Catholic) faith in 589 until the Arab invasion in 711, written and archaeological finds attest to the existence of up to 60 or more churches in the Iberian Peninsula. Visigothic churches were built of very finely worked stone. An example are the rural churches in the areas north of the Douro river that have survived to the present day. Other important churches probably existed in large centres in the south of the peninsula, such as Seville or Toledo. Archaeological finds, especially of the basilica type, confirm their difference from rural architecture. The architecture of urban temples was more closely related to Merovingian or Byzantine architecture. Temples from different workshops differed in construction techniques and decoration. The sculptural decoration reflects an interest in complex ornamentation and plants, which must have reflected, to some extent, Visigothic traditions.

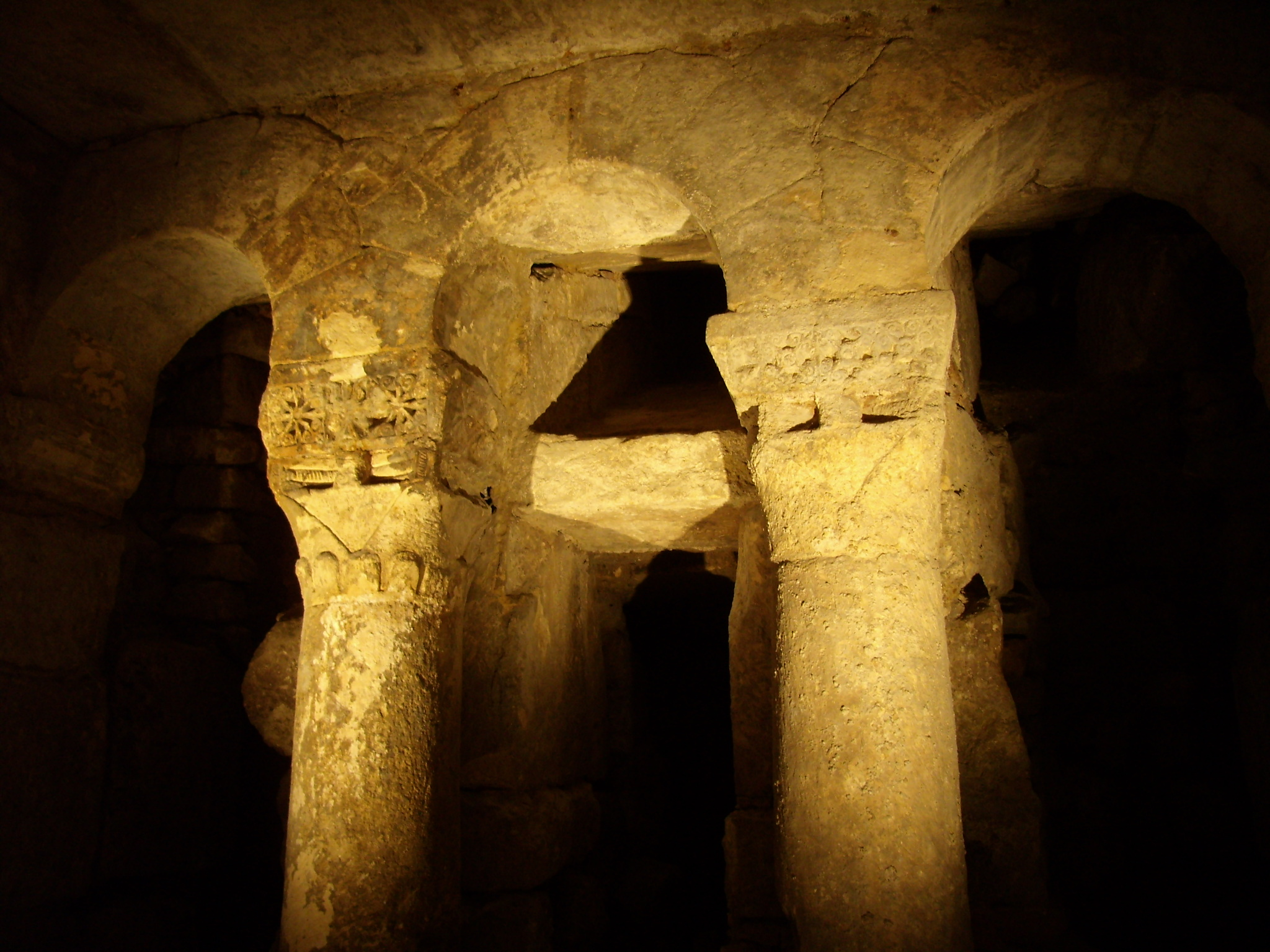
Visigoths remains in the Crypt of San Antolín of the cathedral of Palencia, Spain

The Visigoths were gradually driven out of the southern regions of Gaul by the Frankish rulers. They held the capital Toulouse until 508, when the Frankish king Ludwig I defeated them and pushed them back over the Pyrenees. Except for the region of Septimania, which remained part of the Visigothic Kingdom. Although almost nothing from the Visigothic period survives in Toulouse, a 1727 engraving shows the Church of Notre-Dame-de-la Daurade, probably built during the Visigothic period. It was demolished in 1761. It was an octagonal brick building with a vaulted cloister covered with mosaic decoration, which gave the church its name. The function of the church is unclear. It was probably a palatial chapel, as similar buildings were built at the Roman imperial courts. Regardless of its original function, type and decoration, the building can be dated to the end of the 5th century. The temple was very reminiscent of the San Vitale in Ravenna. Several other structures were modified or built in Aquitaine, such as the chapel of Saint-Christol of Nissan-lez-Enserune or the chapel of Notre-Dame-de-la-Miséricorde near Béziers.

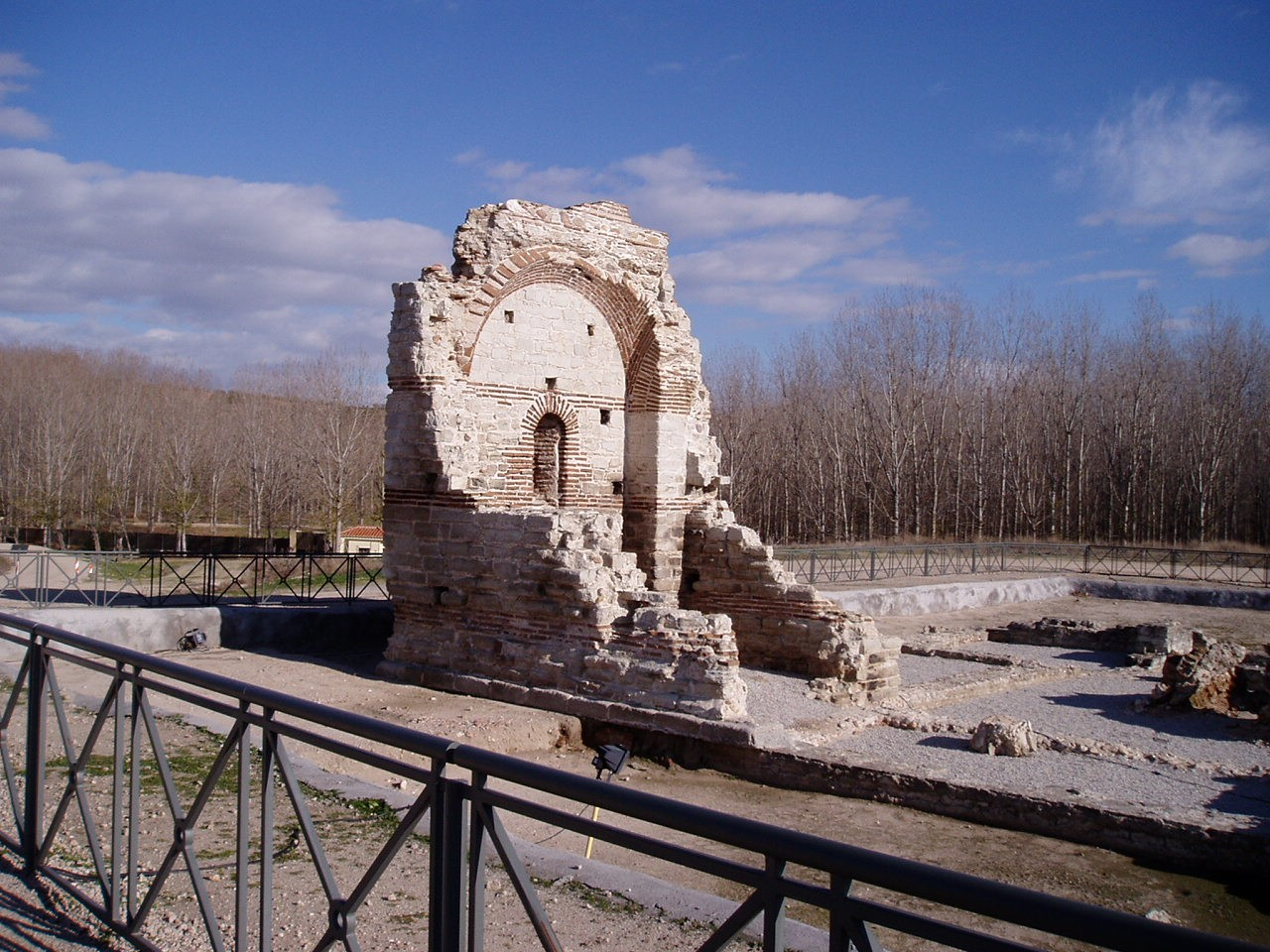
Ruins of Basilica of Santa María de Batres in Carranque, Spain

Horseshoe arch of the portal of the Church of San Juan de Baños, 661, Venta de Baños, Spain

In the Iberian Peninsula, the shops of the basilica type were built with a Greek cross plan, closed by barrel vaults in the trades. The space of the church was divided into a common area for the faithful with two opposite pastophoria and an apse separated by exceptions (cancelli) or walls. The architectural solution separates the laity from the sanctuary. It was also common to use slender and high arcades in the central nave and the horseshoe shape of the apses, some archivolts or vaults. A complete division can be seen in the small church of São Gião, near Nazaré, Portugal. There were narrow doors and openings in the wall that prevented lay people from seeing the ceremony in the apse. In the churches of San Peter de la Nave in Zamora, San Comba de Bande in Ourense, Santa Maria de Lara in Quintanilla de las Viñas, near Burgos, and São Frutuoso de Montélios in Braga, Portugal, the solution of a separate space prevails, in which the crossing is marked by a series of horseshoe-shaped arches. Although it is still not entirely clear whether this was an element of Hispano-Roman architecture or whether it arrived in the Iberian Peninsula with oriental influences, the horseshoe arch was probably adopted later by the Arabs from the Visigoths. To this day, many experts debate whether the horseshoe arch is an ancient element of local arts or a Visigothic innovation. This theory is contradicted by the fact that other Germanic peoples did not use it. The arch not only formed a decorative transition from the conventional semicircular arch, but also expanded the idea of a hierarchically separate space of the temple. The horseshoe arch was placed indoors, but also outdoors, such as the western portal and the arcade of San Juan de Baños. Its development occurred at a time when concerns about secrecy and division were expressed in the councils of the Hispano-Roman Church. The gradual separation of the temple space was probably an unconscious expression of the defensive posture of the Hispano-Roman Church against the oppression of the Arian Visigothic rulers. This system of dividing space also had the effect of improving the status of the clergy. The separation and covering of the sacramental parts increased the authority of the priest in his role as mediator between the laity and God.

A number of 5th- and 6th-century churches, now mostly ruins or archaeological sites, were the source of Hispano-Visigothic architecture, such as the Basilica of Cabeza del Griego in Cuenca and the Basilica of Aljezares in Murcia. The first basilica is dated by the epitaph of bishops Hyginus and Sephronia to around 550. It was a three-naved basilica with a transept, side rooms (diaconium and prothesis) separated from the sanctuary, and a horseshoe-shaped apse, similar to North African basilicas. The Basilica of Aljezares in Murcia had a similar layout, except that the side nave was connected to an adjacent circular baptistery. Other churches are the Basilica of San Pedro de Alcántara in Murcia, the Basilica of Alcarecejos in Córdoba, the Basilica of Casa Herrera in Mérida, the Basilica of Villa Fortunatus in Fraga and the Basilica of Zorita de los Canes in Reccopolis.

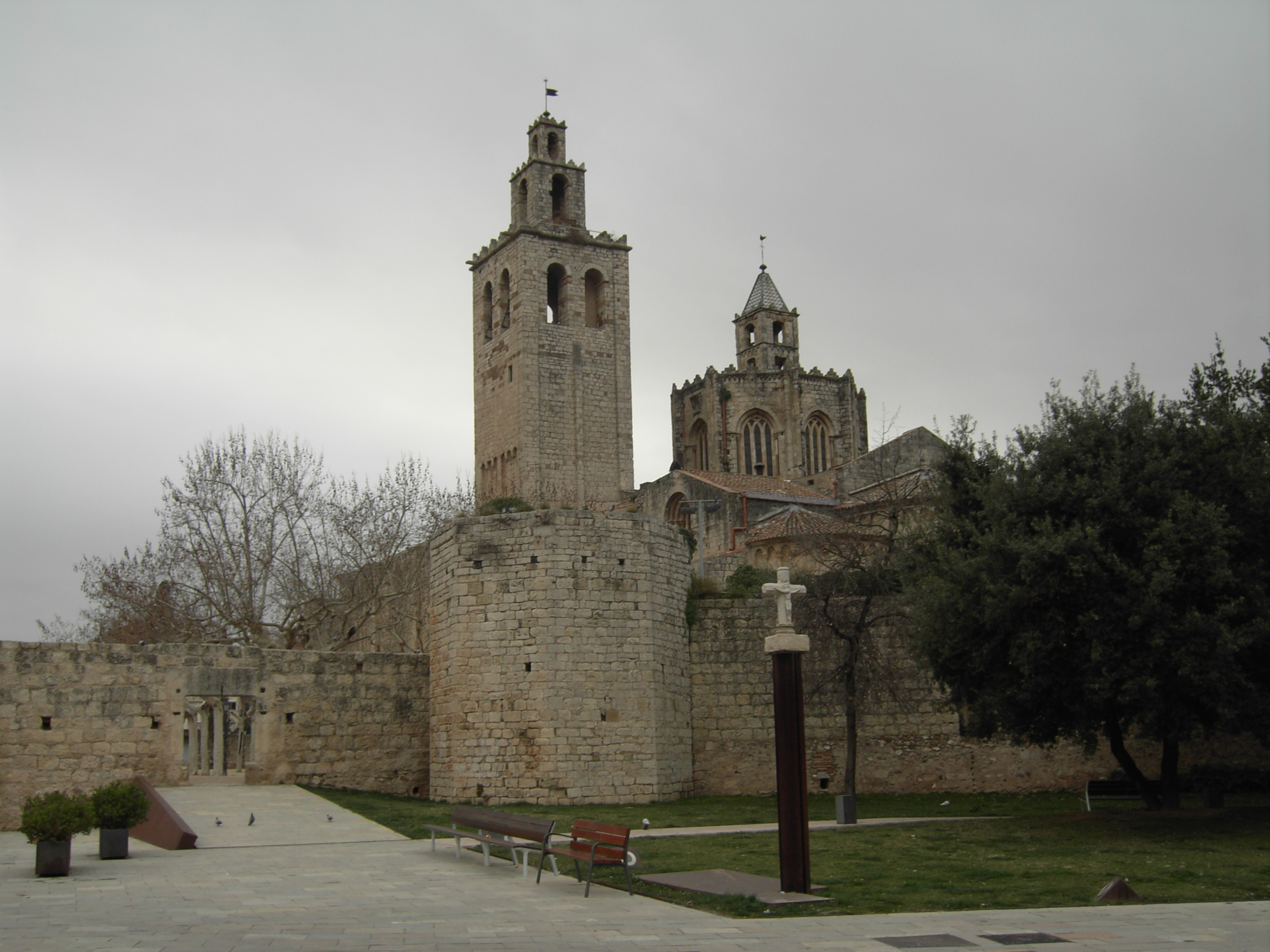
San Cugat del Vallès monastery

=== Sant Cugat del Vallès ===
The small church of the monastery of Sant Cugat del Vallès in Barcelona, from the 6th century, is a notable Visigothic construction. It is a single-nave church with a semicircular apse on the inside and a rectangular apse on the outside. The plan of the church follows the early Christian typology and is later repeated in Mozarabic art and architecture.

Most of the preserved Visigothic churches date from the second half of the 7th century. Visigothic architecture also received external influences. Variants of the Greek or Latin cross plan are used in the churches of San Pedro de La Nave near Zamora, San Comba de Bande in Ourense, São Frutuoso de Montélios in Braga, and San Pedro de La Mata in Toledo. Some buildings, such as the Santa Comba de Bande in Ourense, reflect formal similarities with late antique buildings in Ravenna. According to art historians, the popularity of the cruciform plan stems from an interest in Eastern Roman (Byzantine) architecture, such as the exterior of the chapel (mausoleum) of São Frutuoso de Montélios in Braga. The building reflects Eastern influence and similarities with the Mausoleum of Galla Placidia in Ravenna. The chapel is in the shape of a Greek cross and is built of finely worked stonework and geometrical patterns that may refer to the now extinct Visigothic buildings in Toledo. The architecture of many of the buildings shows the influence of Byzantine art in the Justinian and Heraclius periods. Due to the close contact and frequent wars between the Visigoths and the Byzantines, direct inspiration from Byzantium is reflected, as Isidore of Seville points out in his work De laude Hispaniae.

=== San Juan de Baños ===
The temple of San Juan de Baños, built by the Visigothic king Recceswinth in 661, (Note: The very name of the temple Baños suggests that there were Roman medicinal baths at this site. According to legend, the supposed woman was supposed to cure king Recceswinth with water from this site, who promised to build a temple dedicated to Saint John the Baptist on this site.) is a three-nave basilica with a transept and a temple vestibule as wide as the main nave. According to archaeological research, the basilica originally had two side rooms (diakonikon and prothesis) with barrel vaults separate from the sanctuary, similar to early Christian temples. The rich sculptural decoration of the temple, portal, triumphal arch, cornice and barrel vault of the sanctuary recalls the decoration of Coptic and Syrian temples. The lintel of the portal leading to the temple refers to the Syrian cathedrals of Turmanin and Kalb Luz.

=== Church of San Pedro de la Nave ===
The Church of San Pedro de la Nave, built during the reign of King Égica, is a well-preserved example of a basilica-type church from the late 7th century near Zamora. The plan is in the form of a Greek cross inscribed in a rectangle formed by the adjacent rooms. The church is built of stone blocks, with bricks and quarry stones occasionally used for vaults and upper parts of the walls. The interior tends to be dark, with massive walls and vaulted surfaces that limit direct lighting to a minimum. The supporting system is formed by square pillars, to which, in special and significant places such as the crossing or the triumphal arch, columns are attached with rich relief decoration capitals. The decoration is illustrated mainly with scenes from the Old Testament. The decorative elements on the imposts are similar to those found on the external wall of the apse of the hermitage of Santa María de Lara in Quintanilla de las Viñas.

=== Hermitage of Santa María de Lara ===
Several churches in northern Spain dating from the 8th century can still be considered Visigothic. The most interesting is the hermitage of Santa María de Lara, near Burgos. Only the transept and the square sanctuary of the church have been preserved. The church is built of blue-grey stone blocks. The interior contains several reliefs representing Christ, the Virgin Mary, angels and the sun. The sculptural decoration of the church is illustrated mainly by early Christian motifs, such as the vine.

=== Catalonian churches ===
The last group consists of buildings in Catalonia. These include in particular the churches of Terrassa (St. Peter, which was only a chapel), St. Michael and St. Mary and the cathedral with the baptistery in Egara. The church of Virgin Mary was undoubtedly a three-nave basilica with a beamed ceiling. The church of St. Michael is a small building in the shape of a Greek cross inscribed in a quadrilateral with an apse to the east. The arms of the crossing are vaulted with a ribbed vault and, above the central part, there is a dome on horns. The chapels at the corners are vaulted with conchs.

In secular architecture, the Visigoths used existing Roman public buildings, which they extensively repaired or built new ones in imitation of the same style. King Leovigild famously built the fortified city of Recópole, north of Toledo, in 568. The city's fortifications, palace, temple and residential area were built according to the Roman checkerboard plan. Later, in the 10th century, the city was abandoned. Archaeological excavations have revealed the foundations of a palace and an adjacent temple. The Visigothic kingdom was overthrown by the Arabs, who conquered the entire Iberian Peninsula soon after their invasion in 711. The Arab invasion did not completely destroy Visigothic architecture. The Christian (Mozarabic) population preserved the Visigothic legacy in Mozarabic architecture under Arab rule. In the northwest of the Iberian Peninsula, however, in the small Kingdom of Asturias, a local school was established under the rule of Pelagius. The legacy of Visigothic architecture continues in Asturian architecture, which continued to develop there between the 8th and 10th centuries.

The only remaining examples of Visigothic architecture from the 6th century are the church of San Cugat del Vallés in Barcelona, the hermitage and church of Santa Maria de Lara in Burgos, Saint Frutuoso Chapel in Braga, the church of São Gião in Nazaré and the few remnants of the church at Cabeza de Griego in Cuenca. However, their style developed over the next centuries, though the prime remaining examples of it are mostly rural and often run-down. Some of the characteristics of their architecture are:

- Generally basilican in layout, sometimes a Greek cross plan or, more rarely, a combination of the two. The spaces are highly compartmentalised.
- Horseshoe arches without keystones.
- A rectangular, exterior apse.
- Use of columns and pillars with Corinthian capitals of unique design.
- Barrel vaults with cupolas at the crosses.
- Frequent use of marble as material.
- Walls of ashlar blocks, occasionally alternating with Roman brickwork.
- Decoration commonly of animal or plant motifs.

Examples include:

- Church of San Juan Bautista, province of Palencia, Spain.
- Crypt of San Antolín in the cathedral of Palencia, province of Palencia, Spain.
- Church of Santa Comba in Bande, province of Ourense, Spain.
- Chapel of San Xes (or San Ginés) de Francelos in Ribadavia, province of Ourense, Spain.
- Church of San Pedro de la Mata (in ruins) in Sonseca, province of Toledo, Spain.
- Church of Santa María de Melque in San Martín de Montalbán, province of Toledo, Spain.
- Suso monastery at San Millán de la Cogolla, La Rioja, Spain.
- Basilica of Santa María de Batres in Carranque, province of Toledo, Spain.
- Hermitage of Santa María in Quintanilla de las Viñas, province of Burgos, Spain.
- Church of Santa Lucía del Trampal near Alcuéscarprovince of Cáceres, Spain.
- Crypt of the Monastery of San Salvador de Leyre, Navarre, Spain.
- Church of San Miguel de los Fresnos (in ruins) in Fregenal de la Sierra, province of Badajoz, Spain.
- Interior of church of San Pedro de la Nave, province of Zamora, Spain.
- Saint Frutuoso Chapel in Braga, Portugal.
- Church of São Gião in Nazaré, Portugal.
- Church of San Pedro de la Nave in San Pedro de la Nave-Almendra.

== See also ==
- Treasure of Guarrazar
- Verona Orational
- Visigoths
- Goths

== Bibliography ==
- "Visigothic art". In Encyclopædia Britannica Online.
- Diego Marin, La Civilizacion Espanola, pp. 34 –47, 1969, Holt, Rinehart and Winston, New York.
- Bradley Smith, Spain: A History In Art, pp. 52–56, Doubleday & Company, Garden City, NY, no publication date given, about 1971.
