= Famalicão (Nazaré) =

- Civil parish
- Location in Portugal
- Coordinates: 39.536°N 9.082°W
- Country: Portugal
- Region: Oeste e Vale do Tejo
- Intermunic. comm.: Oeste
- District: Leiria
- Municipality: Nazaré

Area
  - Total: 21.72 km^{2} (8.39 sq mi)

Population (2011)
  - Total: 1,740
  - Density: 80.1/km^{2} (207/sq mi)
- Time zone: UTC+00:00 (WET)
  - Summer (DST): UTC+01:00 (WEST)

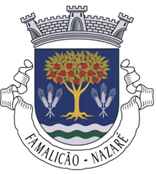
Crest of the village of Famalicão (Nazaré), Portugal

Famalicão is a Portuguese parish in the municipality of Nazaré. The population in 2011 was 1,740, in an area of 21.72 km^{2}.
