= Real, Dume e Semelhe =

- Civil parish
- Location in Portugal
- Coordinates: 41.558°N 8.443°W
- Country: Portugal
- Region: Norte
- Intermunic. comm.: Cávado
- District: Braga
- Municipality: Braga

Area
  - Total: 8.47 km^{2} (3.27 sq mi)

Population (2011)
  - Total: 11,700
  - Density: 1,400/km^{2} (3,600/sq mi)
- Time zone: UTC+00:00 (WET)
  - Summer (DST): UTC+01:00 (WEST)

Real, Dume e Semelhe is a civil parish in the municipality of Braga, Portugal. It was formed in 2013 by the merger of the former parishes Real, Dume and Semelhe. The population in 2011 was 11,700, in an area of 8.47 km^{2}.

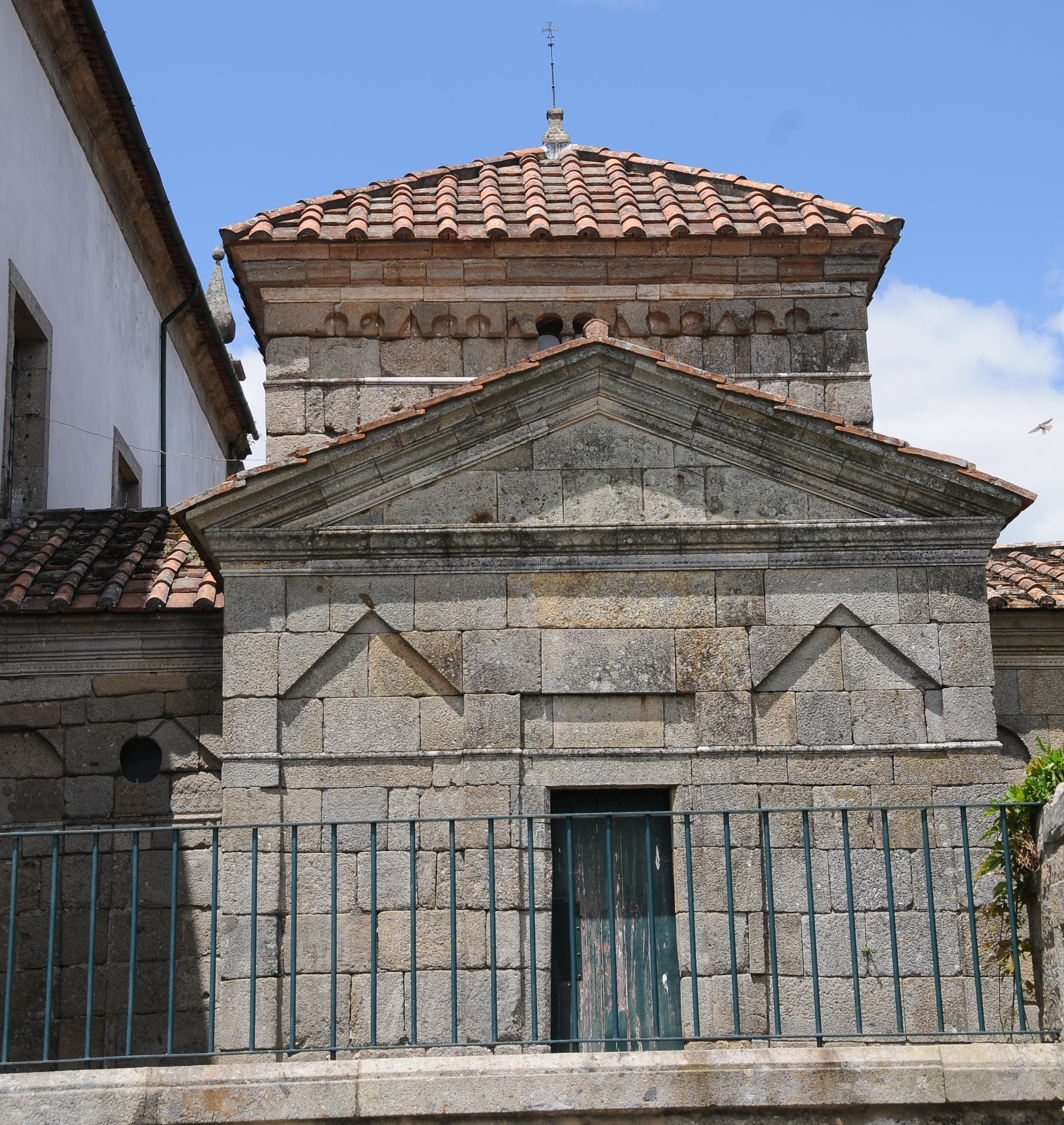
Chapel of São Frutuoso

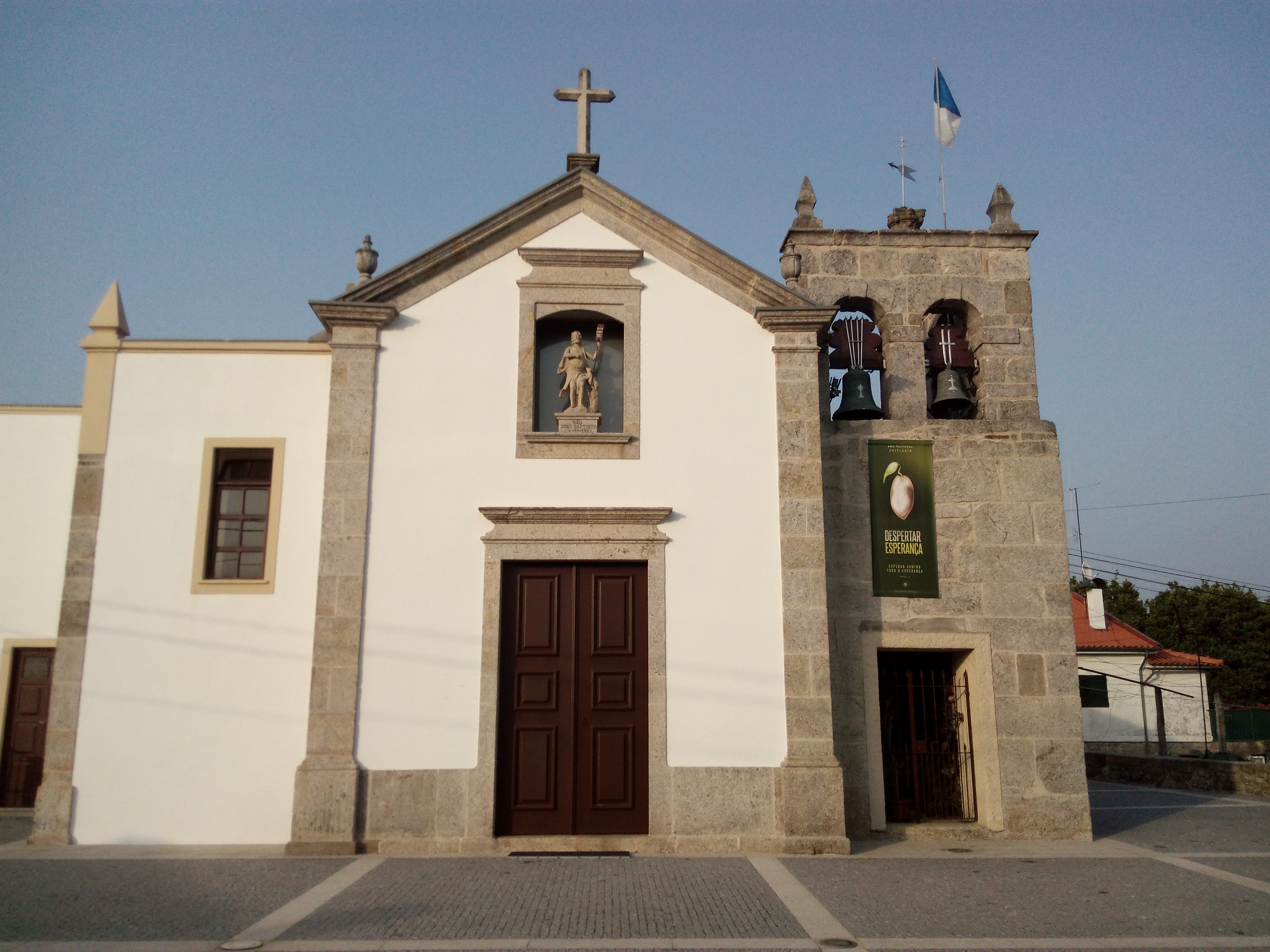
Semelhe Church

== Main sights ==
- Chapel of São Frutuoso
