= Repoblación art and architecture =

Art style in medieval Spain

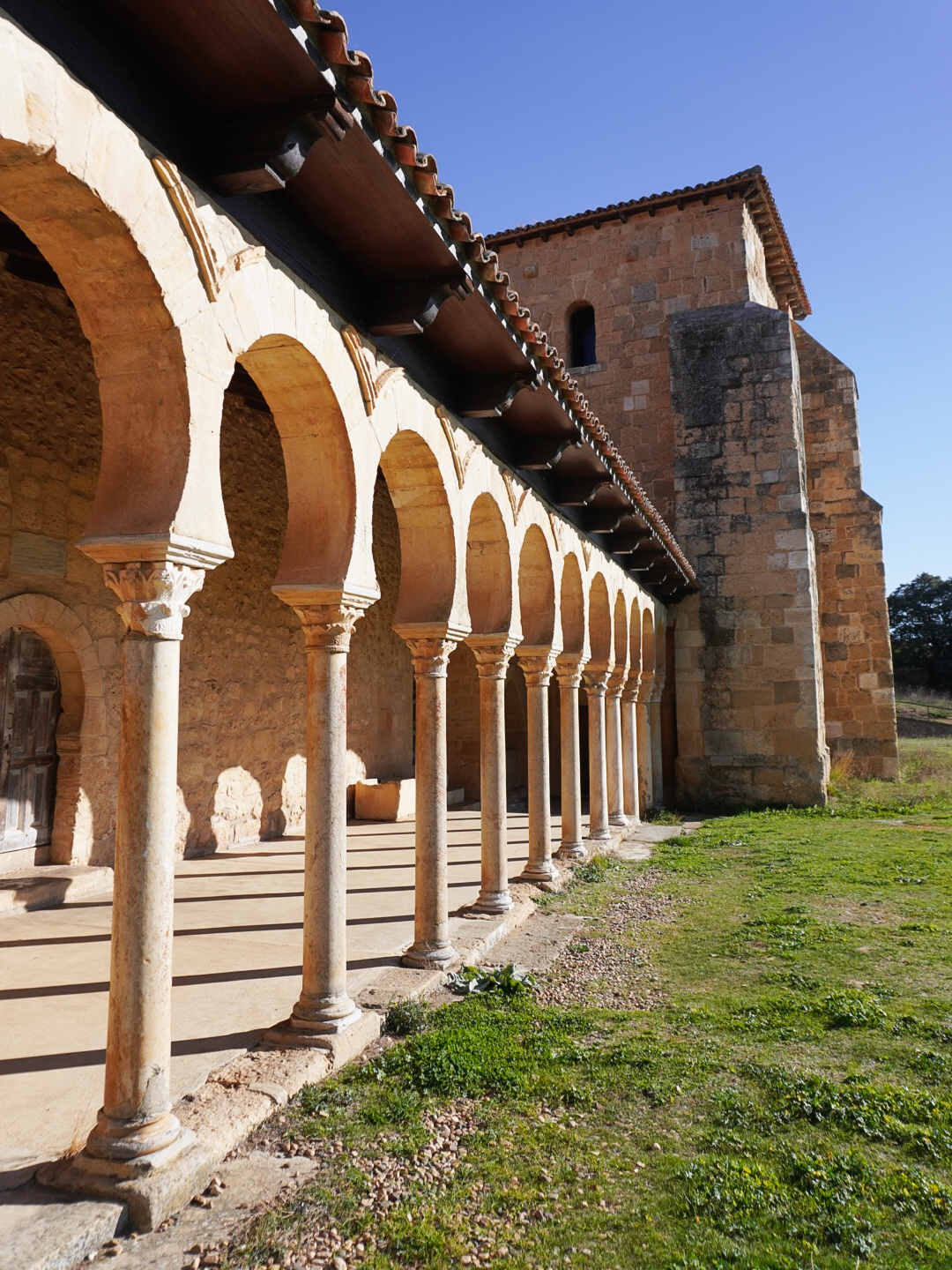
San Miguel de Escalada (S.X), an example of Mozarabic leonese art with influences from the Caliphate of Cordoba

The term "arte de repoblación" (literally, "art or architecture of repopulation") refers to the pre-romanesque churches built in the Christian kingdoms of northern Spain between the late 9th and early 11th centuries. This was a time when these kingdoms were growing stronger after the Muslim occupation.

These churches show a mix of different styles, including Visigothic, Asturian, Mozarabic, Carolingian, and even Andalusian Muslim influences. This mix of styles reflects the different cultures that were living together at that time. Within this period, we can see different groups of churches, like Mozarabic churches in the Kingdom of León or the Serrablo group, each with its own distinctive style.

In the 10th century, Muslim influences can be seen in many buildings in northern Spain, even religious ones. This is because these Christian kingdoms were neighbors to the powerful Muslim caliphate of Córdoba. However, the term "repoblación art" emphasizes that these churches were not always built by the small groups of Mozarabic people who moved to these areas from Muslim-controlled lands.

The term "repoblación art" includes some of the buildings that were previously called "Mozarabic" by scholars following the work of Manuel Gómez-Moreno. However, there is still some debate about this term, and many authors use "Mozarabic art" to describe this period.

In Spanish historiography, the Repoblación is the expansion of Christian settlement in the Duero basin and the Meseta Central in the 9th–10th centuries.

== History ==
The religious influences were inevitable given the presence of the Islamic state of the Caliph of Córdoba, which was highly developed culturally, artistically and economically. However, it had long been suggested that the monumental buildings in northern Spain from this period were crafted by the modest groups of Mozarabic immigrants that settled in the areas of repopulation when the living conditions in Muslim al-Andalus became difficult to bear. As stated by professor Isidro Bango Torviso, suggesting that these immigrants were responsible for these buildings would be akin to suggesting that:

when the Duero River Valley was repopulated under the auspices of the Asturian-Leonese kingdom, northerners settlers would have forsaken all their knowledge and experience and submitted themselves to the 'very rich and demonstrated creative capacity' of poor, rural southern immigrants.

The art and architecture of the Repoblación is identified as the third subset of the Hispanic Pre-Romanesque period, by the phases that correspond to the Visigothic art and architecture and Asturian architecture. Its architecture is a summary of elements of diverse extraction, irregularly distributed, in such a way that on occasion elements of paleo-Christian, Visigothic or Asturian origin come to predominate, while at other times Muslim characteristics come to the fore.

== Characteristics ==
Some of the identifying characteristics of the Repoblación ecclesiastic architecture are:

- Basilica or centralized plan; sometimes with opposing apses.
- Main chapel on a rectangular plan on the exterior and ultra-semicircular in the interior.
- Use of the horseshoe arch of Muslim derivation, somewhat more closed and sloped than the Visigothic.
- Generalized use of the horseshoe arch doorway or alfiz.
- Use of the twin and triple windows of Asturian tradition.
- Roofs composed of segmented vaults, including traditional barrel vaults.
- Grouped columns forming composite pillars, with Corinthian capitals decorated with stylized elements and cinctures joining the capital to the columns.
- Walls re-enforced by exterior buttresses.
- Evolution of rafter ornaments to great lobed offsets that support very pronounced eaves.
- Decoration similar to the Visigothic based on volutes, swastikas, and vegetable and animal themes forming projecting borders.
- A great command of the technique in construction, employing principally ashlar by length and width.
- Absence or sobriety of exterior decoration.
- Diversity in the floor plans, with small proportions and discontinuous spaces covered by cupolas (groined, segmented, ribbed of horseshoe transept, etc.).

== Featured examples ==
Below is a classification of temples of repoblación art into different groups based on their characteristics:

=== Mozarabic Art of León ===
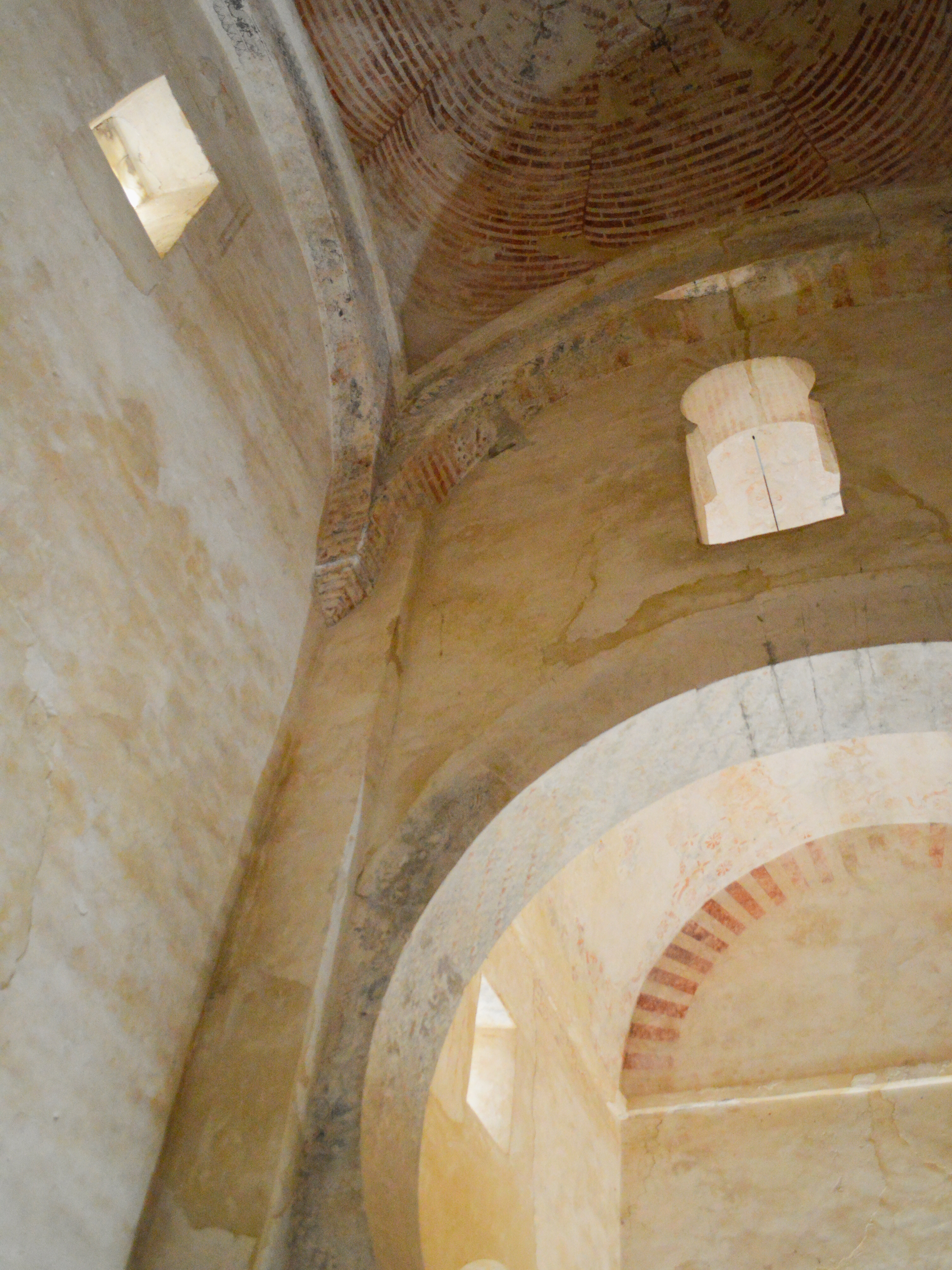
Murals in the style of the Caliphate of Córdoba in the interior of Santiago de Peñalba

The Mozarabic art of the Kingdom of León is the ensemble of repoblación art characterized by being the most refined of this period, reflecting cultural and stylistic contributions from the Caliphate of Córdoba. These influences are manifested in the perfectly executed horseshoe arches, the elaborate spatial articulations, and in some cases, as in the church of Santiago de Peñalba (León), in the presence of murals that evidence the aesthetic relationship with Andalusian art.

- Church of Santiago de Peñalba (León)
- Monastery of San Miguel de Escalada (León)
- Church of San Salvador de Palat del Rey (León)
- Hermitage of Santo Tomás de las Ollas (León)
- Chapel of San Miguel of Celanova (Orense)
- Church of San Cipriano of San Cebrián de Mazote (Valladolid)
- Church of Santa María of Lebeña (Cantabria)
- Church of Santa María of Wamba (Valladolid)

=== Churches of Serrablo ===
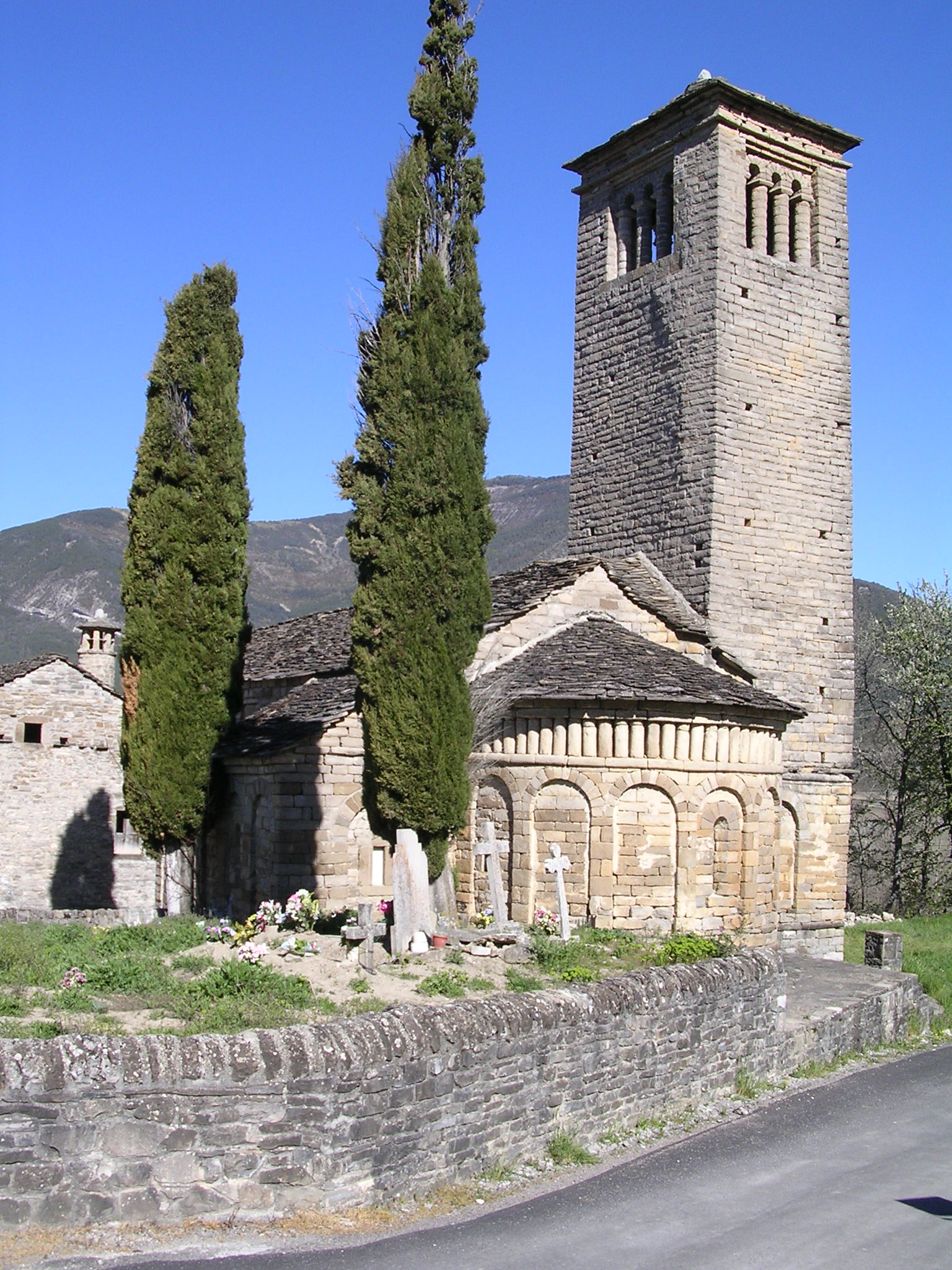
The church of San Pedro de Lárrede is considered the prototype of the Serrablo architectural group

The Churches of Serrablo, located in High Aragon and dated between the 10th and 11th centuries, bring together a group of churches with homogeneous characteristics and difficult classification, as they combine pre-Romanesque, Mozarabic, Lombard, and characteristics that anticipate the Romanesque, which is why it is also called Proto-Romanesque or Aragonese early Romanesque. These constructions usually have single-nave or simple division plans, horseshoe arches of Mozarabic influence, attached bell towers, and an incipient use of barrel vaults.

- Church of San Pedro de Lárrede (Huesca)
- Church of San Juan de Busa (Huesca)
- Church of San Bartolomé de Gavín (Huesca)
- Church of San Martín de Oliván (Huesca)
- Church of San Andrés de Satué (Huesca)
- Hermitage of San Juan Bautista de Rasal (Huesca)

=== Churches of repoblación of difficult classification or transitional ===
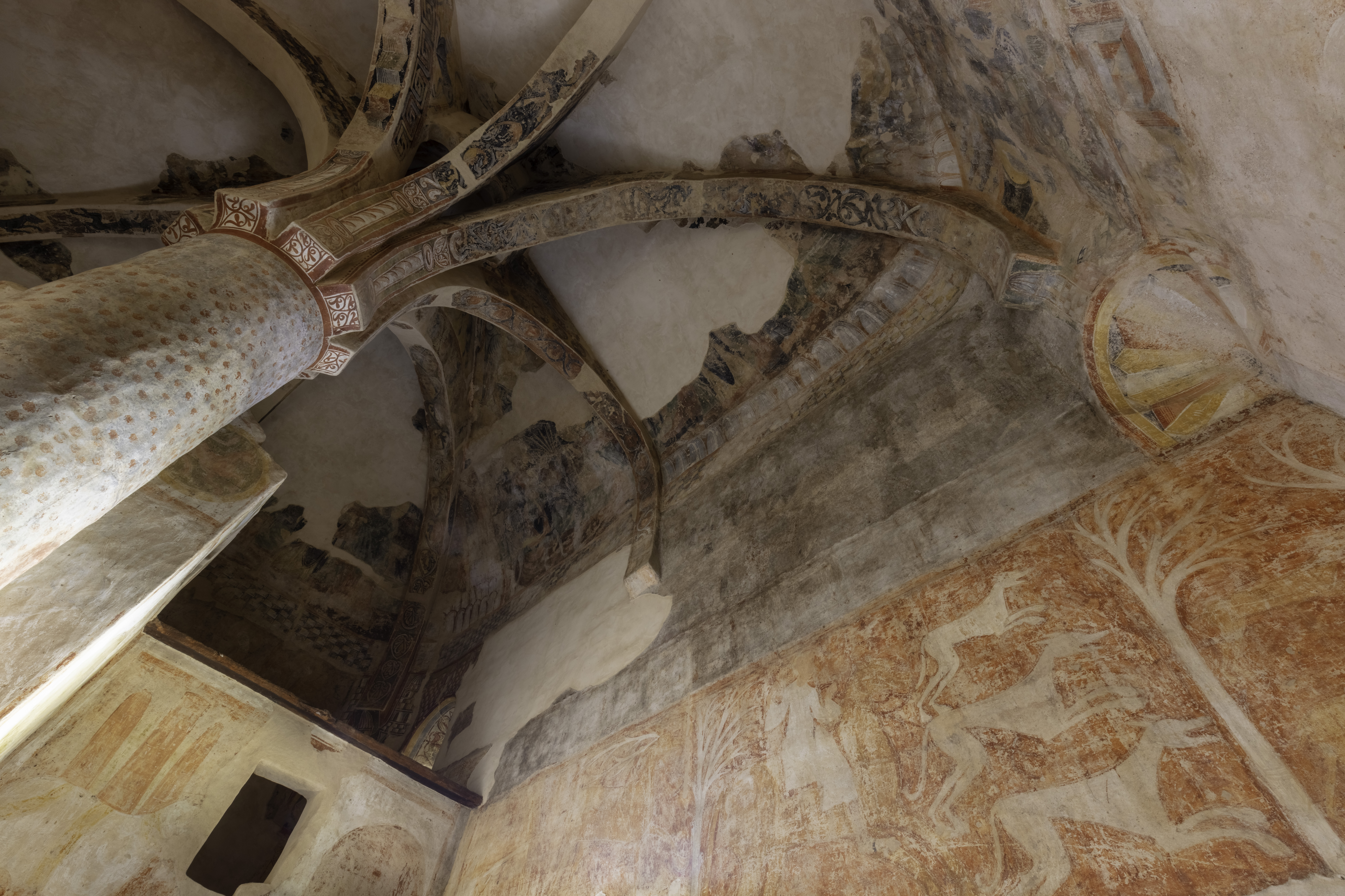
San Baudelio de Berlanga

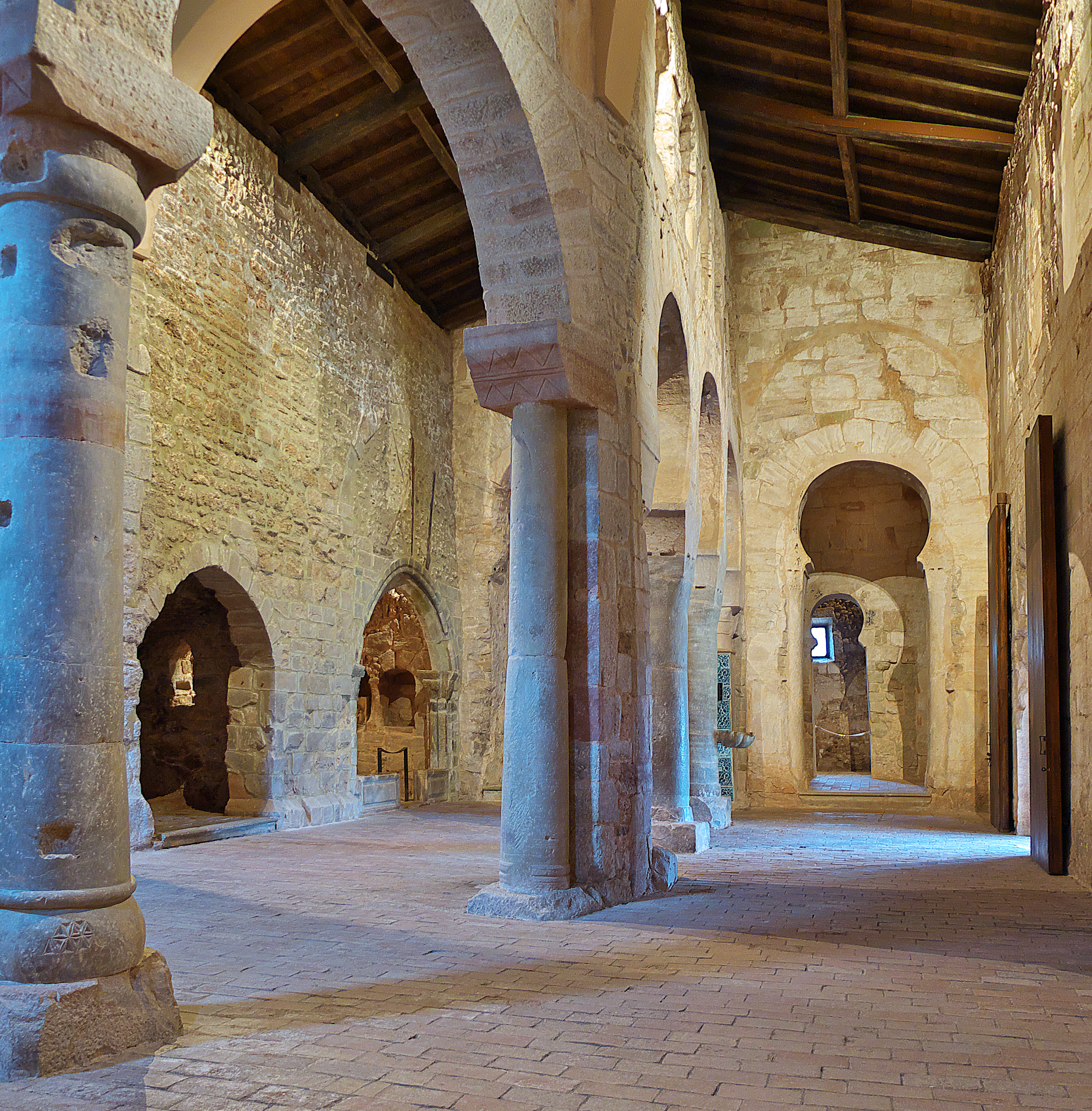
Monastery of San Millán de Suso

These churches present hybrid characteristics, combining Mozarabic contributions in temples of Visigothic origin and, in many cases, with later extensions during the Romanesque period. Notable examples include the Monastery of San Millán de Suso in La Rioja, which preserves Visigothic and Mozarabic traces along with Romanesque reforms, and the hermitage of San Baudelio de Berlanga in Soria, notable for its singular structure with a central column that supports a palm-shaped vault and its murals.

- Monastery of San Millán de Suso (La Rioja)
- Hermitage of San Baudelio de Berlanga (Caltojar, Soria)
- Hermitage of San Román de Moroso (Arenas de Iguña, Cantabria)
- Hermitage of Santa Céntola y Santa Elena (Siero, Burgos)
- Church of San Vicente del Valle (Burgos)
- Monastery of San Juan de la Peña (Jaca, Huesca)
- Church of the Monastery of Leyre (Navarre)
- Monastery of San Salvador of Tábara (Zamora)
- Church of San Quirico de Pedret (Barcelona)
- Church of San Cristóbal of Cabrils (Barcelona)
- Hermitage of San Julián de Boada (Gerona)
- Church of Santa María de Matadars (Barcelona)

== See also ==
- Spain in the Middle Ages
- Reconquista
