= St Mary's Church, Wamba =

Santa María de Wamba
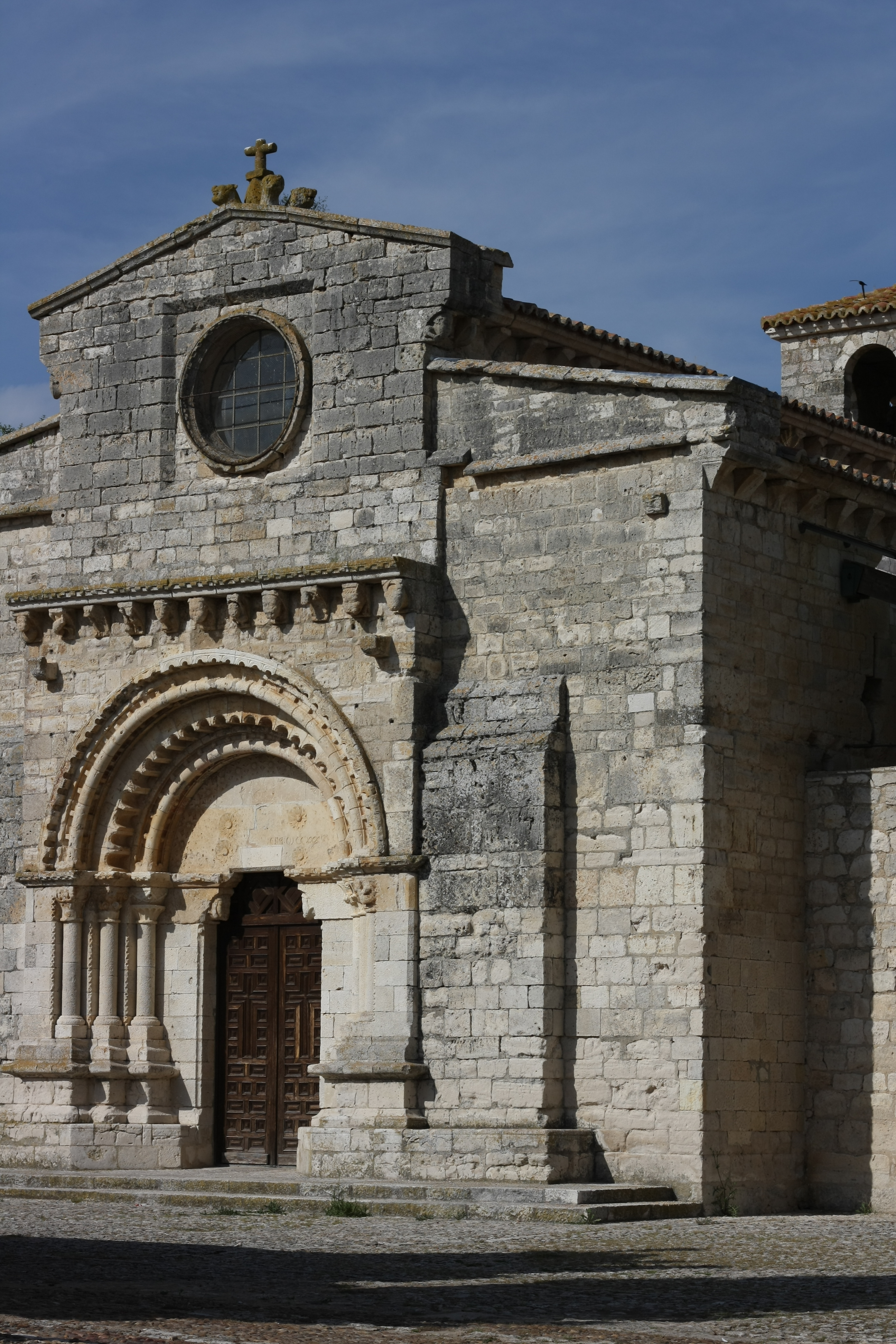
- west facade

Religion
- Affiliation: Roman Catholic
- Ecclesiastical or organisational status: Active

Location
- Location: Spain
- Interactive map of Santa María de Wamba
- Coordinates: 41°40′34″N 4°55′04″W

Architecture
- Type: Church
- Style: Mozarabic, Romanesque

The Church of St Mary at Wamba, province of Valladolid, Spain (Spanish: Santa María de Wamba) is a medieval building dating back to the Reconquista. The eastern part of the building is of 10th century date, whereas the western part is 12th century. The church is of architectural interest and is being considered for World Heritage Site status along with nine other Mozarabic sites. It is currently on a "tentative list" (part of the nominating process).

== History ==
During the reign of King Recceswinth (died 672), Wamba had a royal residence and the existence of a Visigothic church there is also known: remains of its decoration are preserved in the Museum of Valladolid.

After the Umayyad conquest of Hispania, the area was reconquered by Christians under Alfonso III of Asturias, who reigned 866–910. It seems that with the subsequent repopulation, Wamba's then existing church was rebuilt. The oldest part of the current church is dated to the 10th century. There are documentary records of a monastery in Wamba at this time of which the church is assumed to have been part. It was perhaps the first Mozarabic church in the area.

== Architecture ==
It has been suggested that Wamba was repopulated by people coming from the north and that for this reason the architecture is closer to the Visigothic and Asturian influences than other buildings in the region such as the church at San Cebrián de Mazote, a village which was repopulated by Christians who came from Al-Andalus.

== Burials ==
Queen Urraca of Portugal became a nun after the annulment of her marriage, and was buried in the church.

There is an ossuary.

== Gallery ==
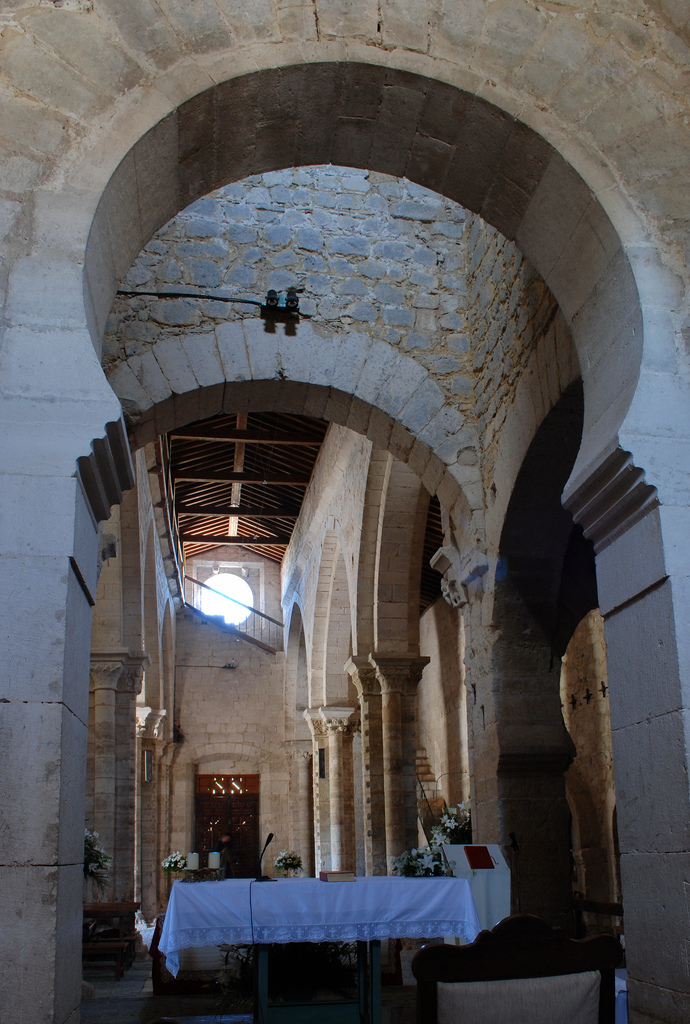
Interior of St. Mary's Church

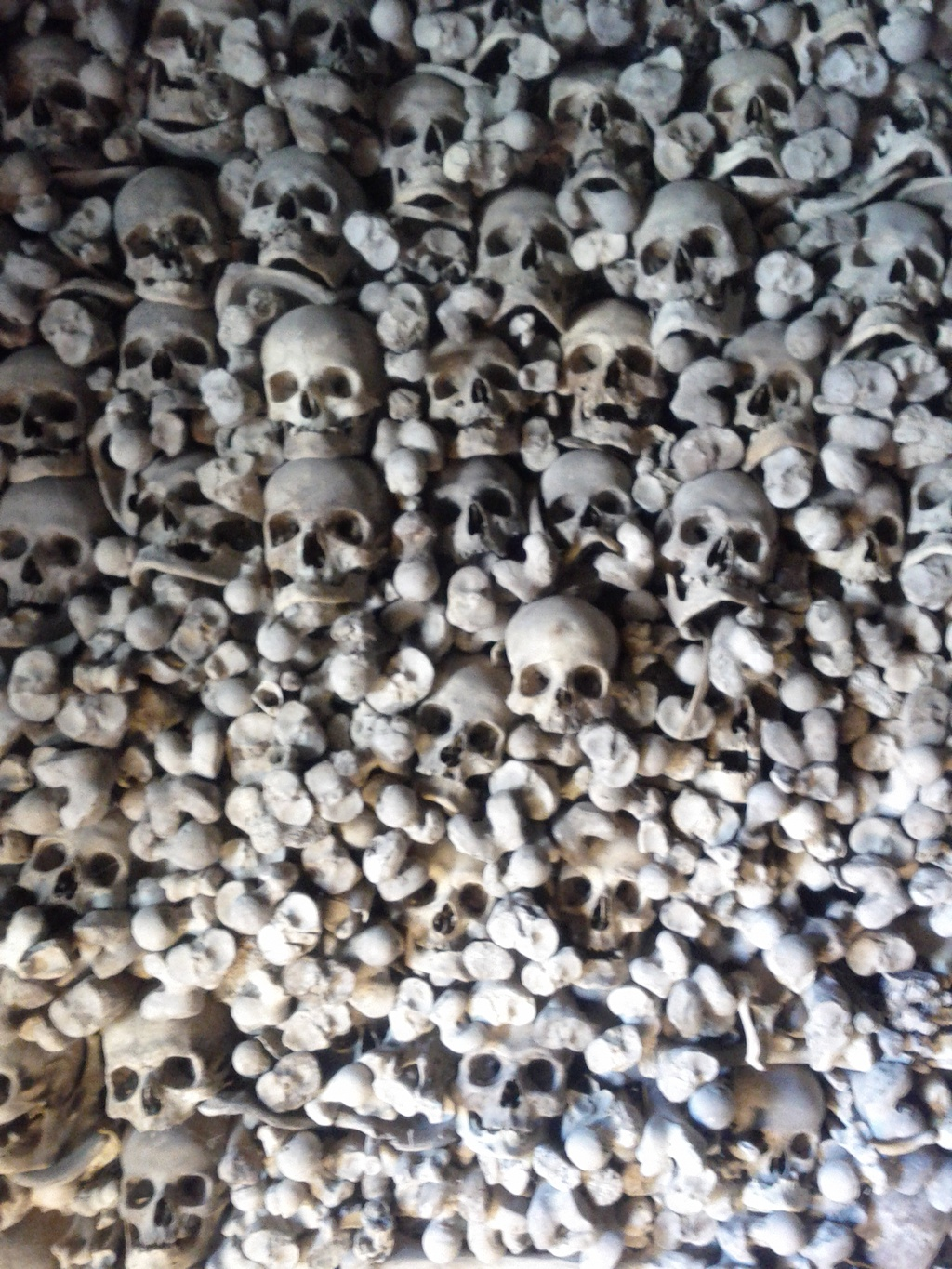
Ossuary of St. Mary's Church

== Bibliography ==
- Elorza, Juan C.; Vaquero, Lourdes; Castillo, Belén; Negro, Marta (1990). Junta de Castilla y León. Consejería de Cultura y Bienestar Social (ed.). El Panteón Real de las Huelgas de Burgos. Los enterramientos de los reyes de León y de Castilla. Publisher Evergráficas S.A. ISBN 84-241-9999-5.
