= Monastery of San Miguel de Escalada =

Monastery in León Province, Spain

Coordinates: 42°33′36″N 5°18′53″W

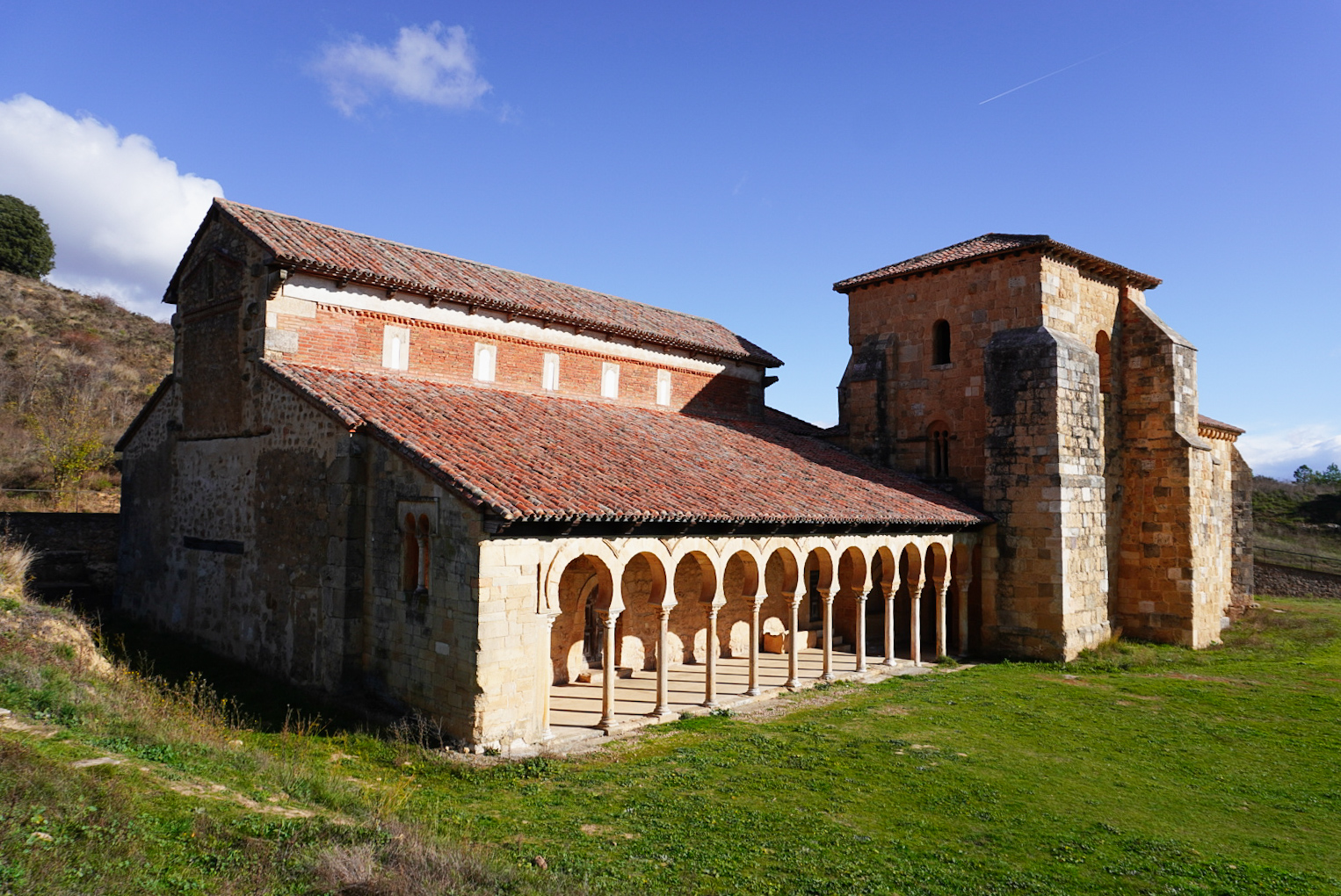
San Miguel de Escalada, as seen from the west

San Miguel de Escalada is a monastery in the province of León, Spain, located 10 km from the Way of St. James pilgrimage route to Santiago de Compostela. The building is an example of Mozarabic art and architecture or Repoblación art and architecture.

== History ==
This inscription that has disappeared but was published by Father Risco in 1786 gave information about the church's consecration in 951 by Bishop Genadio of Astorga, around the time of the founding of the Kingdom of León. It was constructed on a site dedicated to Saint Michael, probably a Visigothic church:

Hic locus antiquitus Michaelis archangeli honore dicatus, brevi opere unstructus, post ruinis abolitus, diu mansit dirutus; donec Adefonsus abba cum sociis adveniens cordubensi patria edis ruinam erexit sub valente sereno Adefonso principe. Monachorum numero crescente, demum hoc templum decorum miro opere a fundamine exumdique amplificatum erigitur; non iussu imperiali vel oppresione vulgi, sed abatis Adefonsi et fratrum instanti vigilantia duodenis mensibus peracta sunt hec opera, Garsea sceptra regni peragens Mumadonna cum regina, Era DCCLI. Sacratumque templum ab episcopum Jenadium XII Kalendas Decembrium

This place, in the antique consecrated in honor of the Archangel Michael, of reduced dimensions and fallen in ruins after, remained in that way for a long time; until the abbot Alfonso and his committee who was coming from his fatherland Córdoba, raised the ruins of the building under the effective patronage of the king Alfonso. As the number of monks increase, at length they determine the wonderful work of enlarging the current temple from its foundations. No under royal command or oppressing the people, but by the attentive tenacity of the abbot Alfonso and his monks during twelve months until the finalization of the work, under García reign with his wife Mumadonna. In the era nine hundred and fifty one. The temple was consecrated by the bishop Genadio.

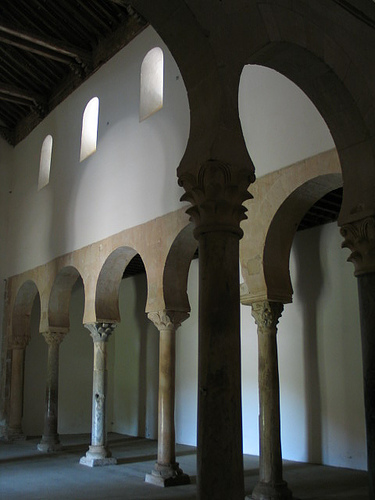
Monastery of San Miguel de Escalada: interior

In 1050, due to an increase in the number of monks, the foundation was renewed by the Abbot Sabarico. In 1155 King Alfonso VII of León gave the monastery to the Order of Saint-Ruf.

After the disentailment of ecclesiastical properties and lands in 1836 (Desamortización de Mendizábal), the monastery was abandoned and the monastic offices disappeared. The only buildings extant are the church, the tower, and the San Fructuoso chapel. The tower and the chapel are of Romanesque style. Later in the nineteenth century the buildings were declared a national monument.

== Architecture ==
The monastery church's nave has three aisles separated by columns and large horseshoe arches, with their apses and a crossing, which is not covered by a cimborio or central tower. The choir is separated from the principal nave by three horseshoe arches sometimes called an iconostasis).

Despite the floor plan, the building appears from the exterior as a rectangular block. All arches take down in marble shafts and Corinthian steeples proceeding from other Visigothic or Roman constructions (as it may be appreciated in a cyma carved as from a gravestone, perhaps from the nearby Roman city of Lancia).

The building has wood panels, which are decorated with paintings from the 15th century.

Architectural highlights include a meridional porch fixed by twelve horseshoe arche), which were built in two different phases: the seven occidental arches, with columns and steeples are in the moorish style, while the Mozarabic work from the 10th century is preserved in the alfiz decorations around the arches

== Gallery ==
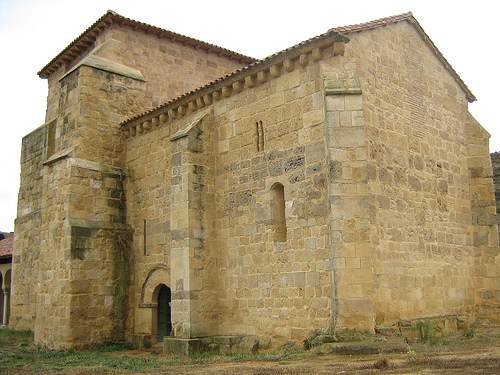
East side

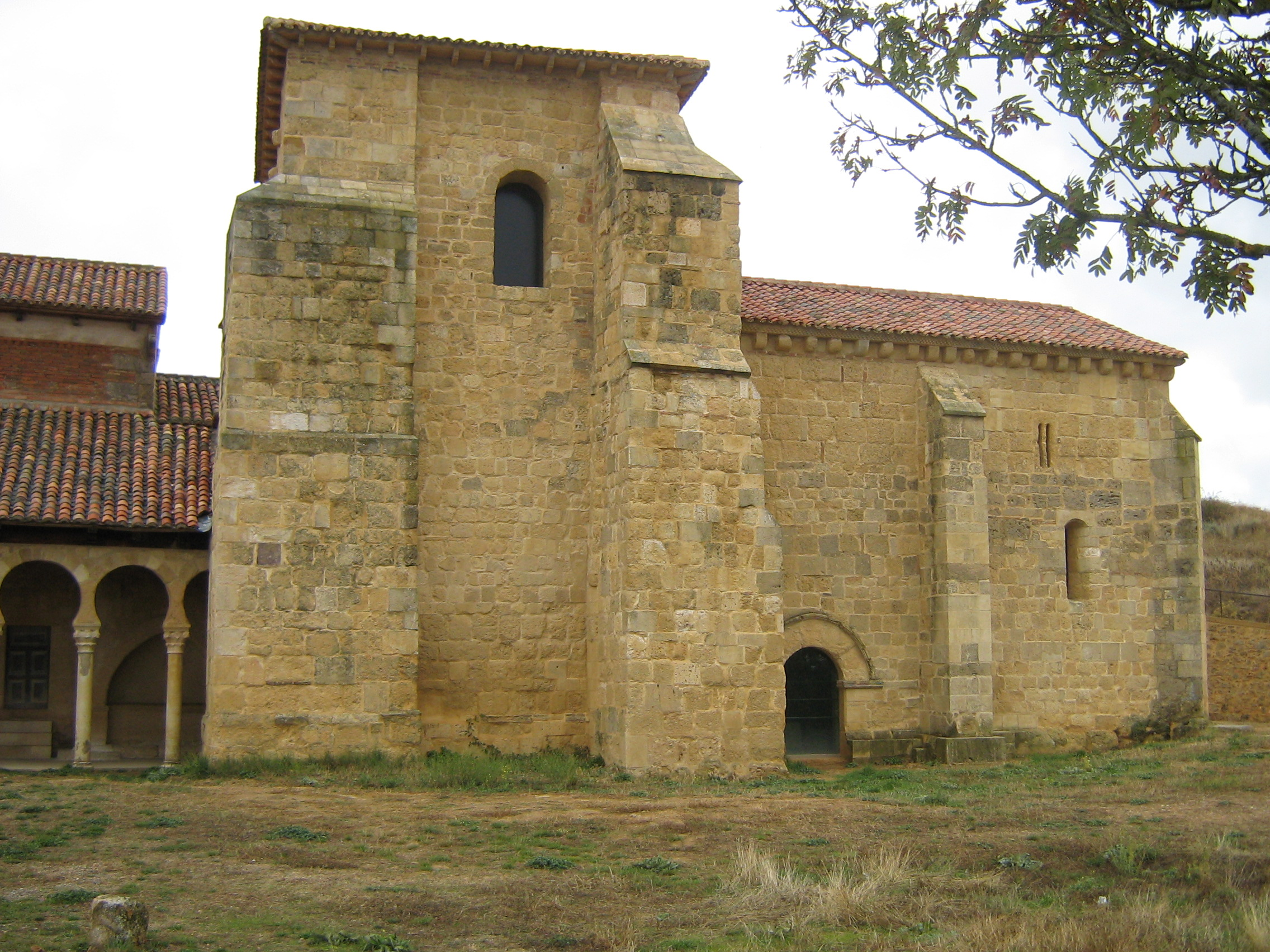
South side

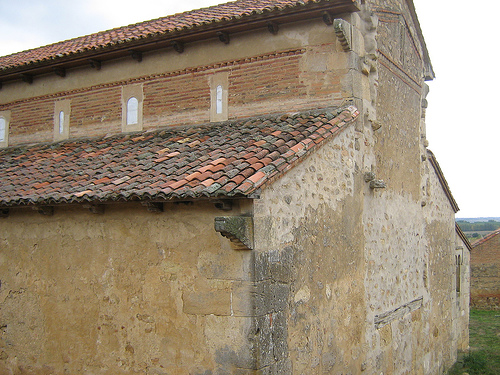
West side

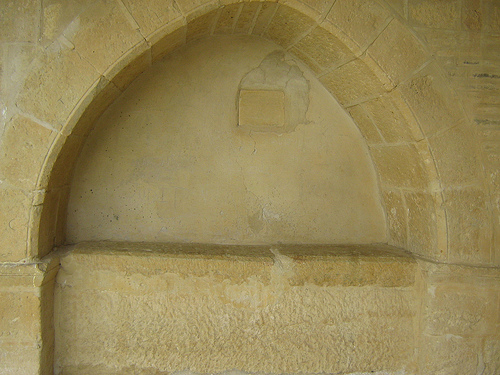
Niche with altar

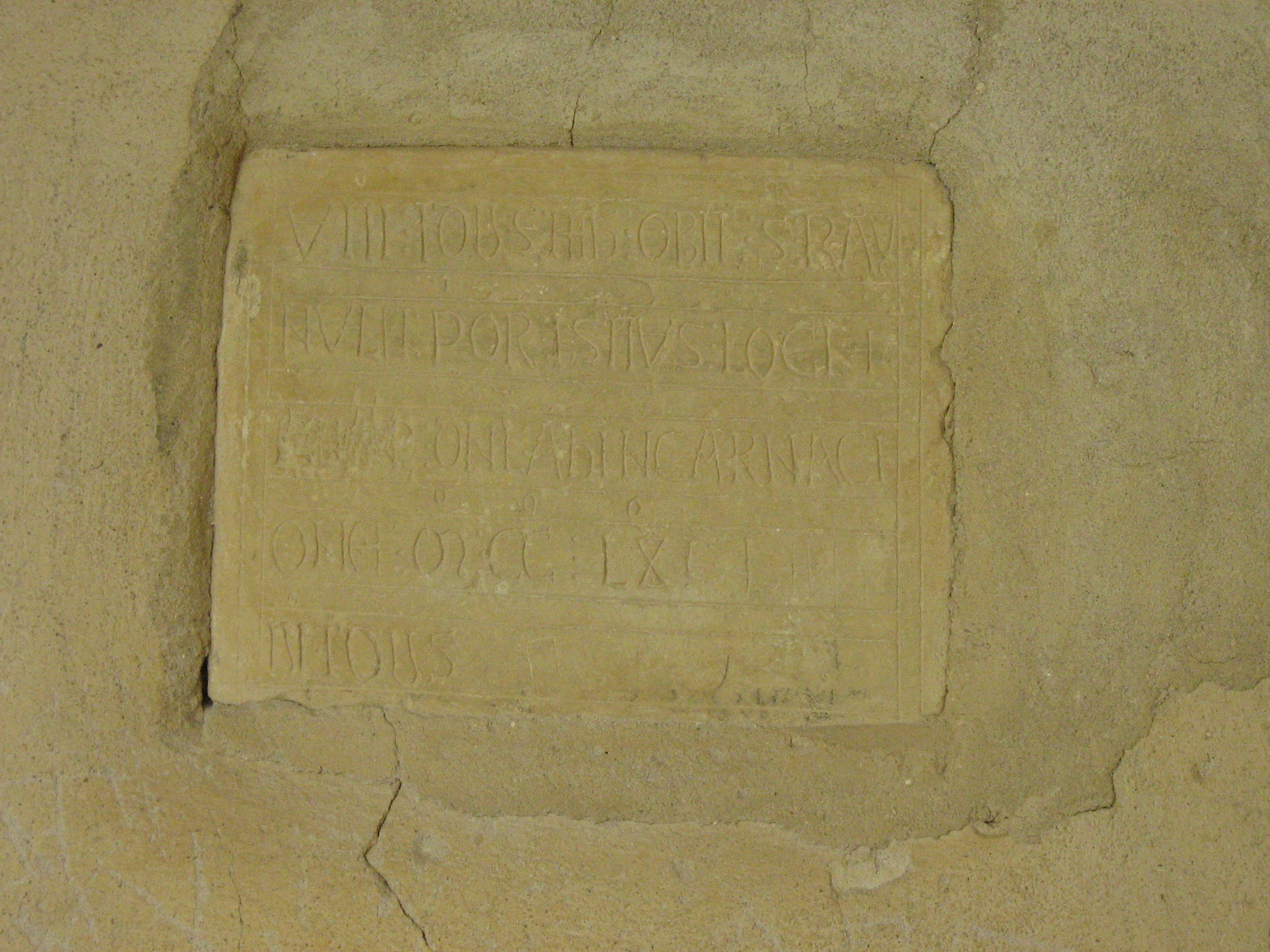
The altar, detail

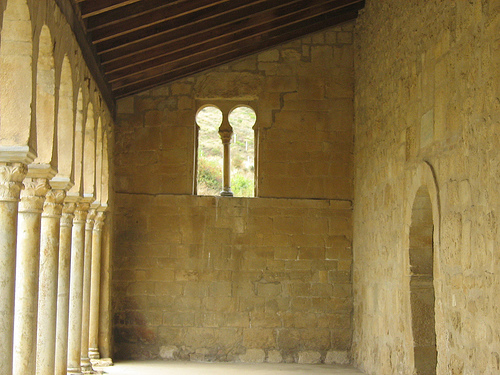
Inner view of the porch

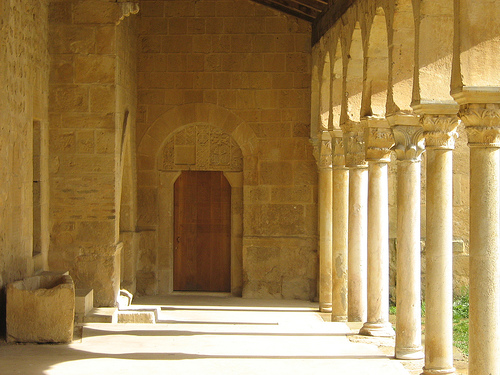
Inner view of the porch

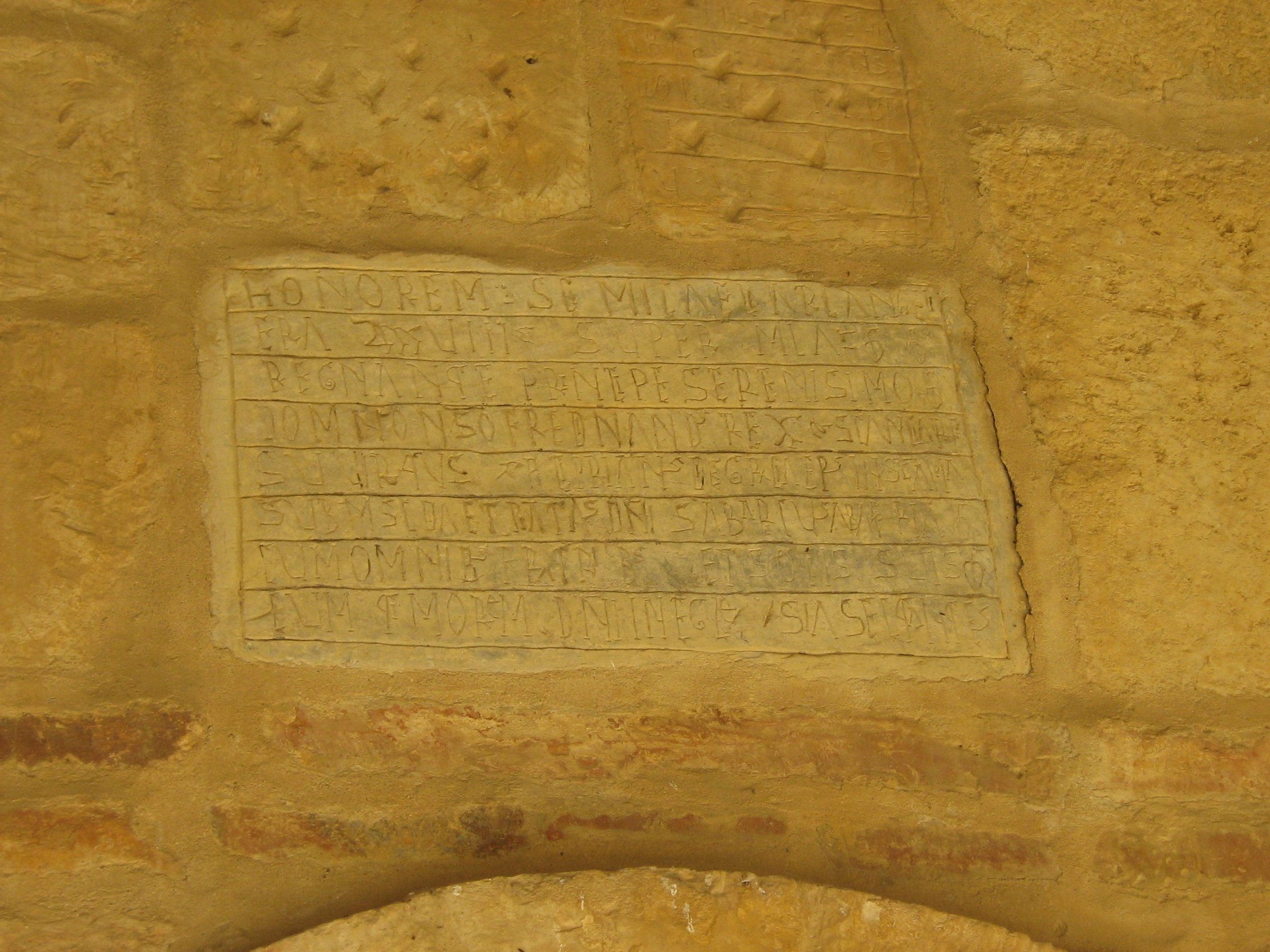
Altar inside the porch

== See also ==
- Early medieval domes
