= Mozarabic art and architecture =

Artistic style on the Iberian Peninsula

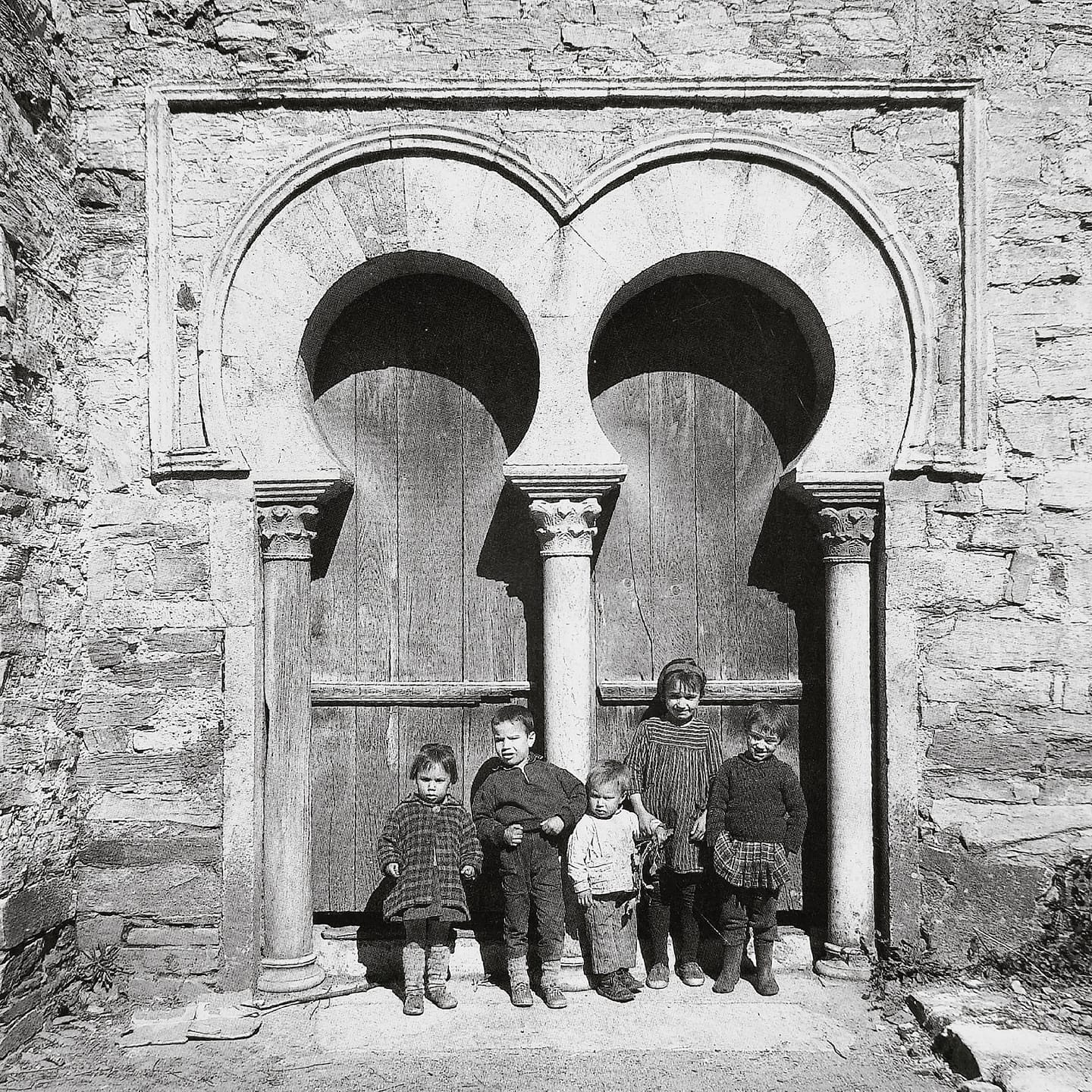
Mozarabic arches in the Church of Santiago de Peñalba (El Bierzo, Spain)

Mozarabic art is an early medieval artistic style that is part of the pre-Romanesque style and emerged in al-Andalus and in the kingdom of León. It is named after the Mozarabs (from musta'rab meaning "Arabized"), the Christians of al-Andalus. It was developed by the Hispanic Christians who lived in Arab-Muslim territory and in the expansion territories of the León crown, in the period from the Arab-Islamic Conquest of the Iberian Peninsula (711) to the end of the 11th century. During this period, disciplines such as painting, goldsmithing and architecture with marked Caliphate influences were cultivated in a context of medieval coexistence - Christian, Hebrew and Muslim - in which the territories were constantly changing in size and status. Other names for this artistic style are Leonese art or repopulation art.

== Description ==
Mozarabic art is a diverse and hybrid artistic expression that flourished primarily in al-Andalus and in the Kingdom of León during the 9th and 10th centuries. It is characterized by a fusion of influences, especially Andalusian, and displays a classical continuity, either in the Visigothic tradition of the north or with the refined Caliphate of Córdoba, rooted in Byzantine origins.

In the Leonese plateau, between the rivers Duero, Esla, Cea, and Pisuerga, various constructions emerged, ranging from modest single-nave churches with rectangular apses, typical of the early repopulation, to complex monastic complexes like San Cebrián de Mazote, Santa María de Wamba, Santiago de Peñalba, and San Miguel de Escalada, among others.

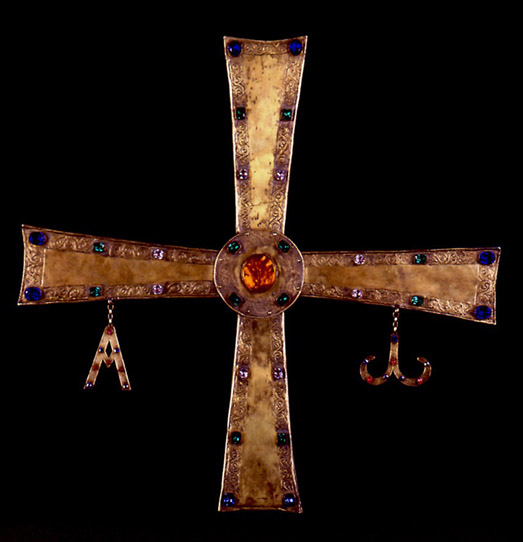
Cross of Peñalba, a piece of 10th century Mozarabic goldsmith's work

The Leonese elites were the main proponents of this art, from the monarchy to civil and ecclesiastical figures within the royal environment, such as Bishop Genadio of Astorga or the Galician noble Rudesind of Celanova. Despite being Christians from the north, they were influenced by Andalusian tastes, as seen in the case of King Alfonso III, who even sent his son to the court of the Banu Qasi in Zaragoza.

Mozarabic art blends two traditions, a Christian northern one and a Muslim southern one, which, despite their differences, shared a Mediterranean classical root. In the people's perception at that time, there were no conceptual distinctions between them; they considered both as part of a common tradition. This art stands out for its great formal variety, being a promiscuous and original style in the context of European pre-Romanesque art. The constructions showcased a unique blend of styles, prolific in experimenting with vaulted structures, domes, capitals, reliefs, and the "Roman" mural painting technique with Andalusian influence.

In territories under Muslim rule, Mozarabic communities maintained some of the Visigothic temples for their religious rituals, rarely constructing new ones due to limited authorizations for new church buildings. The shifting of the Christian-Muslim frontier to the river Duero basin led to the construction of new temples, concentrating all available artistic capacity to meet repopulation needs. As life conditions in Muslim Andalusia became less bearable and the Christian kingdoms in the northern peninsula expanded, some Mozarabs chose to migrate to the offered territories. Their Hispano-Gothic culture overlapped with Muslim elements, contributing innovative elements to the recent Christian kingdoms in all aspects.

While there is an exceptional subgroup of temples, grouped as part of the distinctive art of the Kingdom of León or fusion art, these Mozarabic temples were likely the work of Muladis or Muslims converted to Christianity who migrated from Al-Andalus. Examples include Santiago de Peñalba and San Miguel de Escalada, temples with Cordoban influences and considered two of the great artistic achievements in the frontier society of the Kingdom of León during the 10th century.

== Mozarabic literature ==
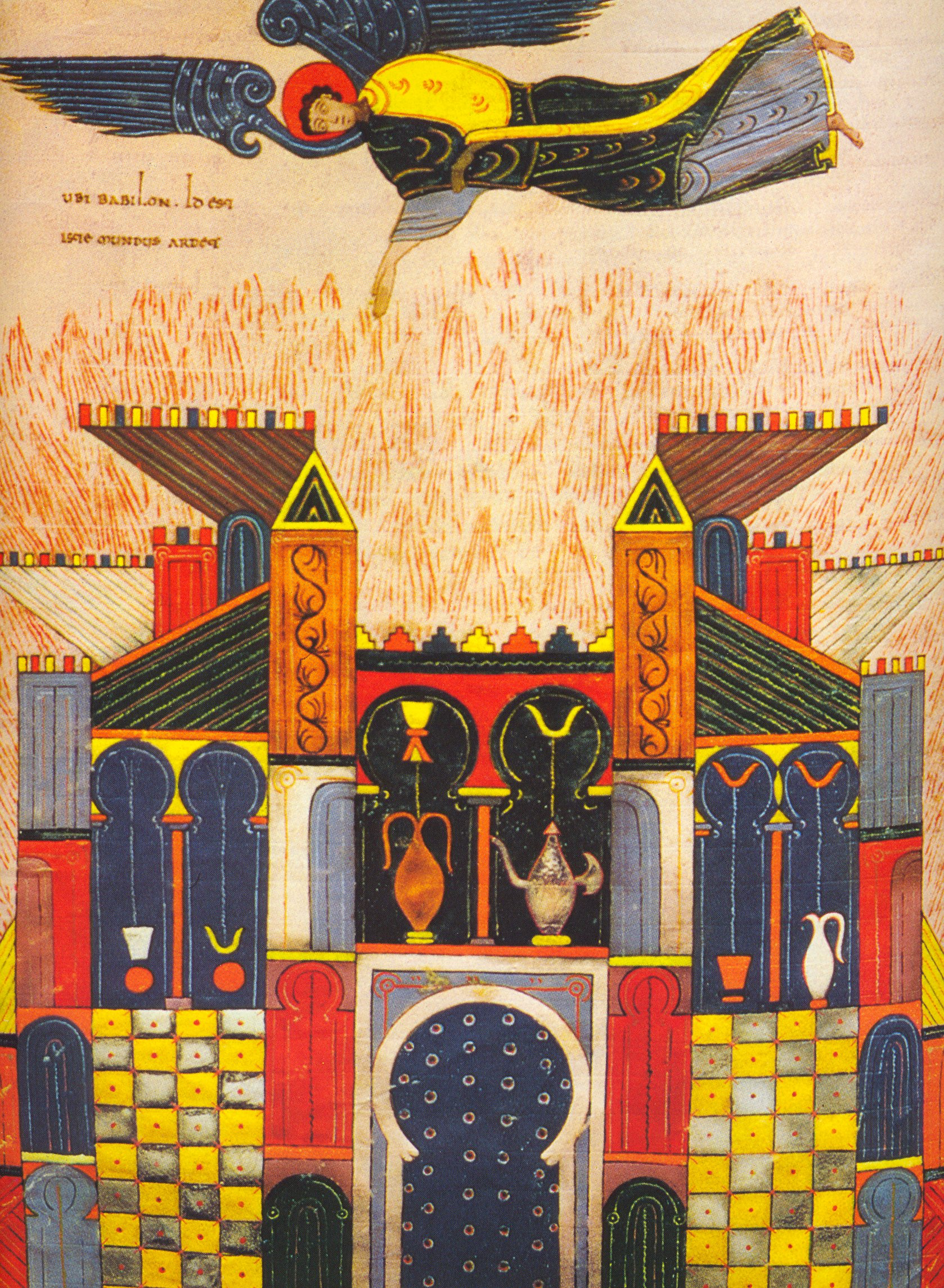
Beatus of Facundus: Judgment of Babylon

The principal exponent is religious literature: Mozarabic missals, antiphonaries and prayerbooks, created in the scriptorium of the monasteries. Examples of quality and originality of the miniatures and illuminated manuscripts are the Commentarium in Apocalypsin (Commentary on the Apocalypse) from Beatus of Liébana, Beatus of Facundus or Beatus of Tábara. Or antiphonaries like the Mozarabic Antiphonary of the Cathedral of León (Antifonario mozárabe de la Catedral de León).

Toledo and Córdoba were the most important Mozarabic centers. From Córdoba was the abbot Speraindeo, who wrote an Apologetic against Muhammad. And very important for the history of philosophy studies is the Apologetic of the abbot Sansón (864).

== Mozarabic architecture ==
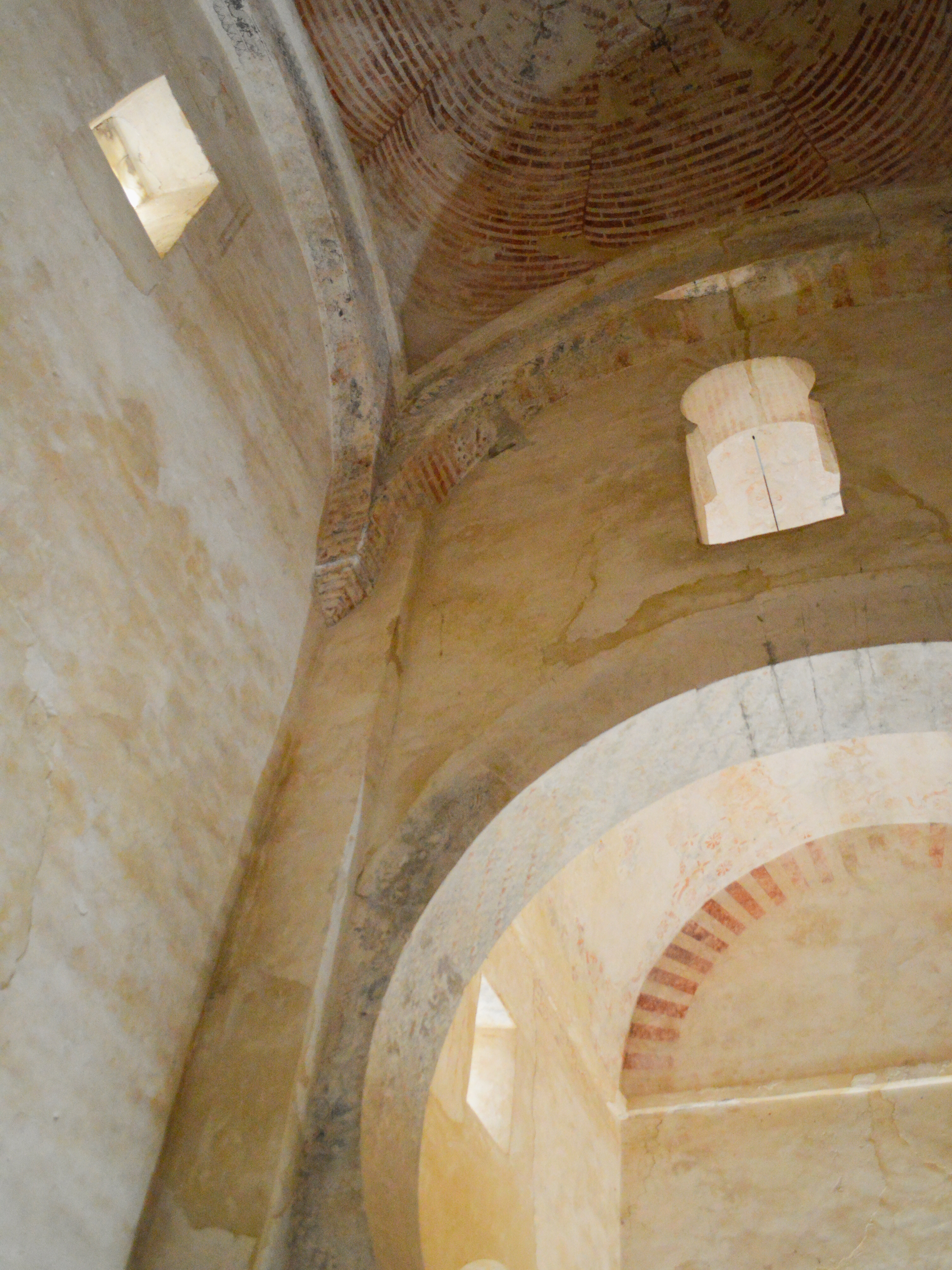
Caliphate-style mural paintings in Santiago de Peñalba

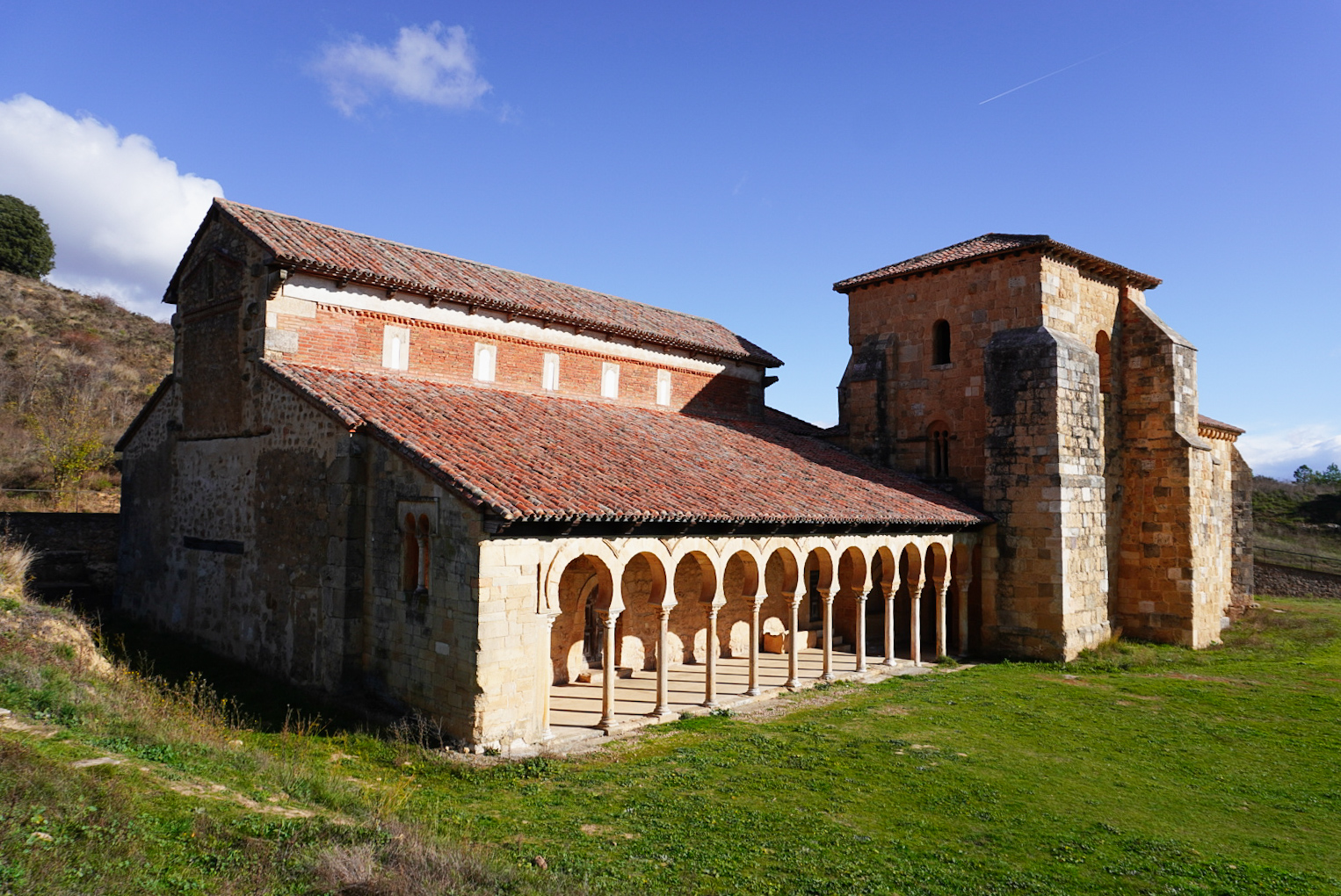
Monastery of San Miguel de Escalada

Mozarabic architecture is a blend of elements that defy easy classification, often showcasing influences from Paleochristian, Visigothic, or Asturian origins, while at other times, the Muslim imprint takes precedence. The primary characteristics defining Mozarabic architecture include:

- A great command of the technique in construction, employing principally ashlar by length and width
- Absence or sobriety of exterior decoration.
- Diversity in the floor plans, certainly the majority stand out by the small proportions and discontinuous spaces covered by cupolas (groined, segmented, ribbed of horseshoe transept, etc.).
- Use of the horseshoe arch, a very tight arch with the slope being two-thirds of the radius.
- Use of the alfiz.
- Use of the column as support, crowned by a Corinthian capital decorated with very stylized vegetal elements.
- The eaves extend outwards and rest on top of corbels of lobes.

=== Mozarabic in al-Andalus ===
Within the territory conquered by al-Andalus, there is a scarcity of evidence of temples built by Mozarabs. The most notable example is the rock-cut churches of Bobastro, located in Ardales, Málaga province. This unique enclave, carved into the rock, was part of a defensive and religious complex during the rebellion led by Omar ibn Hafsún, a leader who converted to Christianity and challenged the Emirate of Córdoba in the 9th century. Bobastro, in addition to its liturgical function, symbolized resistance against Islamic power, leaving an architectural and historical legacy that reflects the tensions and cultural influences of the time.

Therefore, only two examples of Mozarabic architecture have survived in Muslim territory:

- The Church of Bobastro: rock temple located in the place known as Mesas de Villaverde, in Ardales (Málaga).
- The Church of Santa María de Melque: located in proximity to La Puebla de Montalbán (Toledo).

=== Mozarabic in the Kingdom of León ===
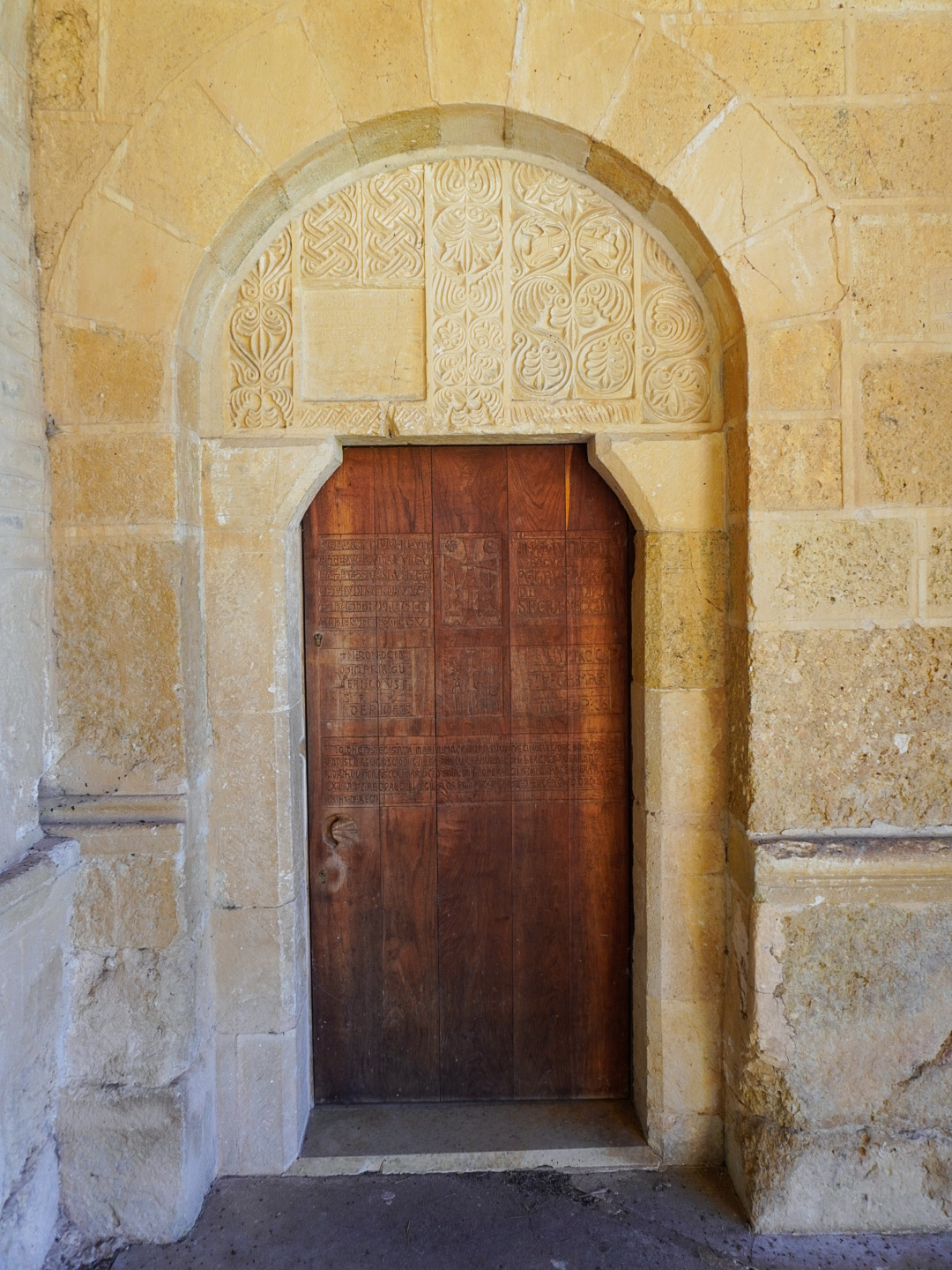
Vegetable figures of Arab influence in San Miguel de Escalada

Mozarabic art in the Kingdom of León is characterized by being the best preserved and most sophisticated of this period, reflecting cultural and stylistic contributions from the Caliphate of Córdoba. These influences are evident in the perfectly executed horseshoe arches with alfiz, the elaborate spatial articulations, the preference for columns as supporting elements, and the interior wall paintings in the Andalusian style.

- San Miguel de Escalada (León)
- Santiago de Peñalba (León)
- Santo Tomás de las Ollas (León)
- San Cebrián de Mazote (Valladolid)
- San Millán de Suso (La Rioja)
- Santa María de Wamba (Valladolid)
- San Salvador de Tabara (Zamora)
- Chapel of San Miguel de Celanova (Orense)
- Santa María de Lebeña (Cantabria)
-Hermitage of San Román de Moroso (Cantabria)

=== Repopulation churches difficult to classify or transitional ===
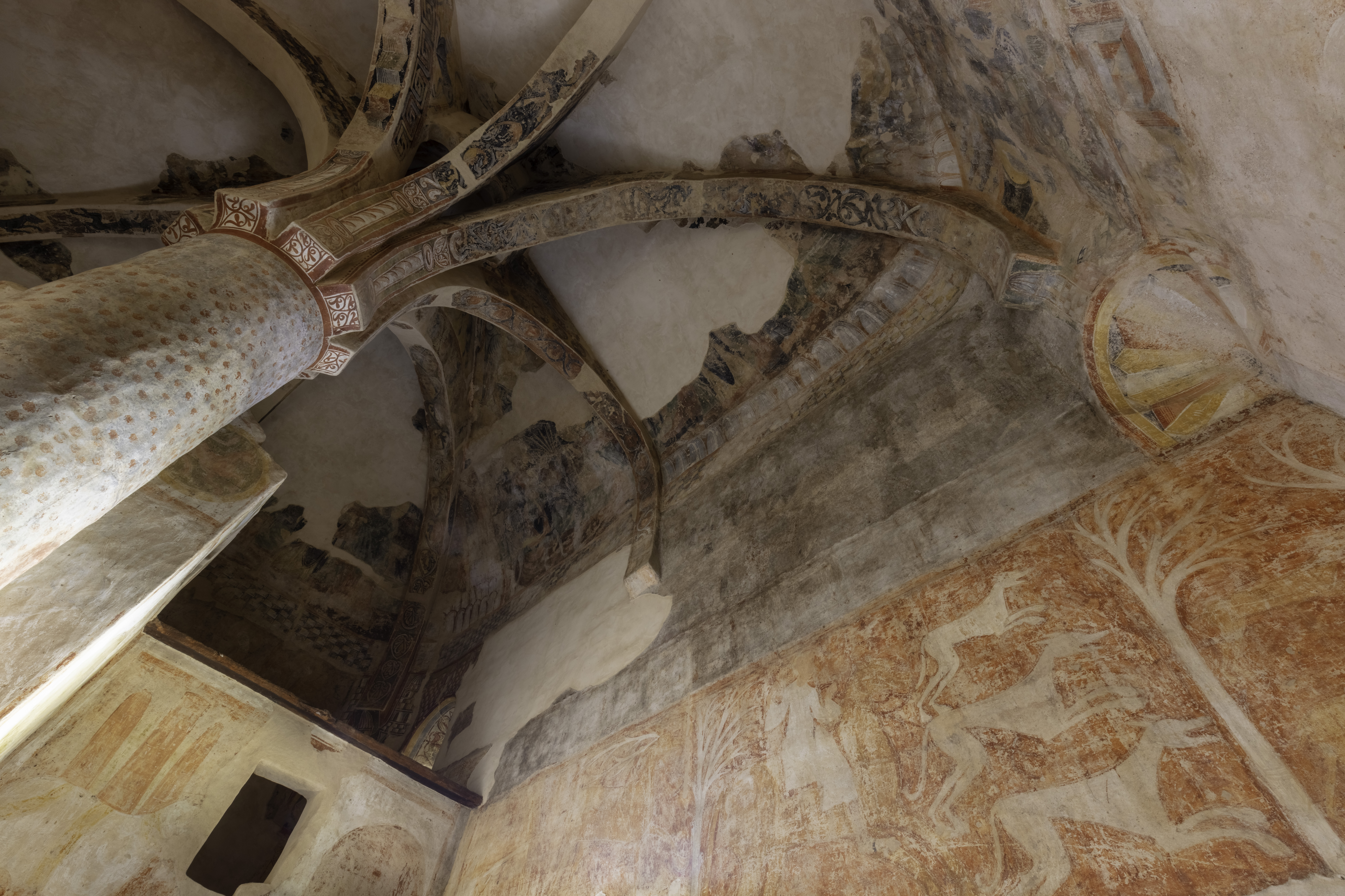
Pictorial interior of San Baudelio de Berlanga

These churches and hermitages exhibit hybrid characteristics, combining Mozarabic elements in temples of Visigothic origin and, in many cases, with later additions during the Romanesque period. A standout example is the hermitage of San Baudelio de Berlanga in Soria, the most enigmatic of this group, notable for its unique structure with a central column supporting a palm-shaped vault and its mural paintings.

- San Baudelio de Berlanga (Soria)
- Sant Quirze de Pedret (Barcelona)
- Santa Maria de Marquet (Barcelona)
- Church of Sant Cristòfol (Barcelona)
- Sant Julià de Boada (Girona)
- Santa Maria de Matadars (Barcelona)

== Mozarabic painting ==
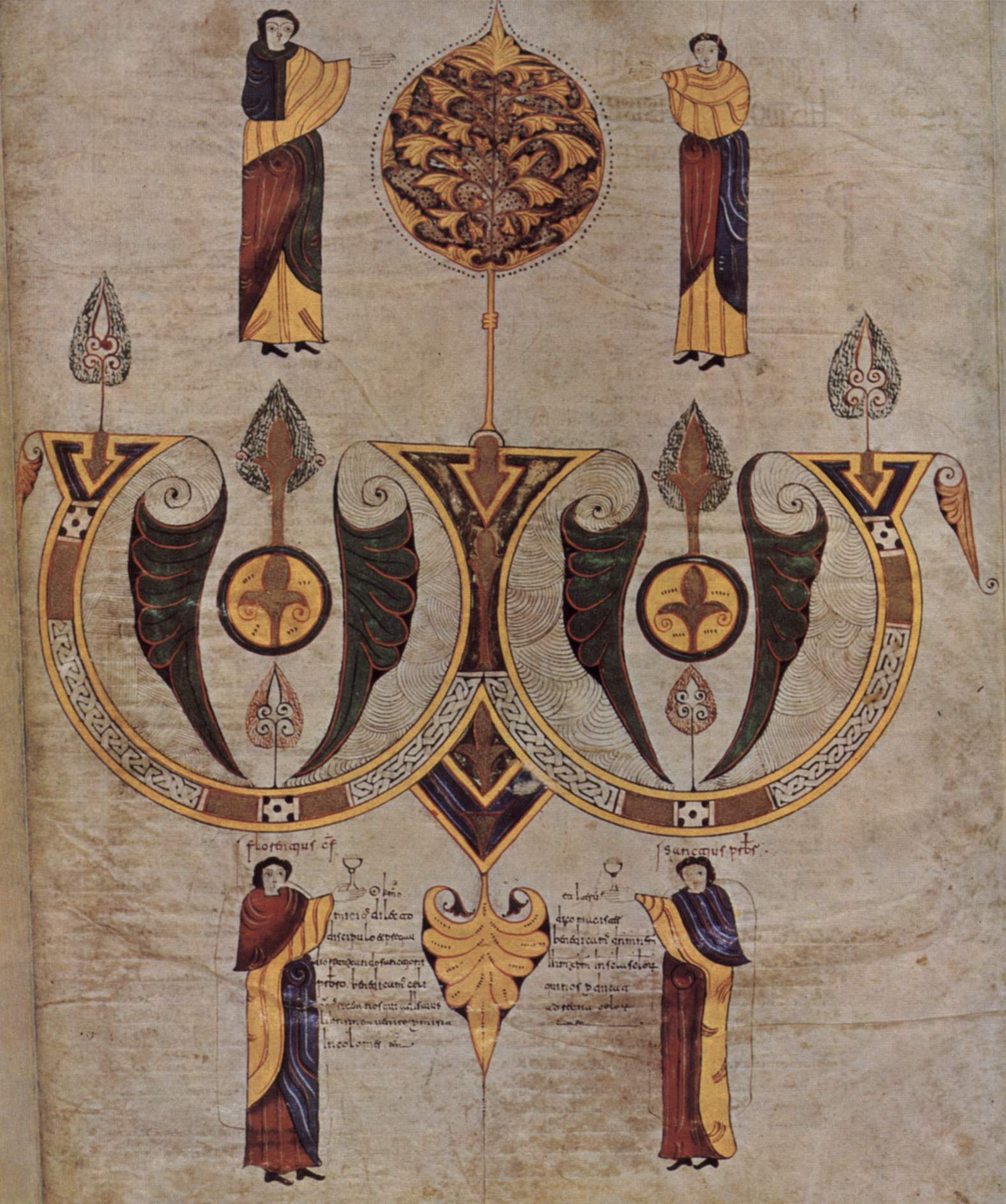
Codex Biblicus Legionensis

Mozarabic painting stands out for its contribution to the religious illuminated manuscripts, with the Beatus manuscripts being among its most significant achievements. Characteristics of Mozarabic painting include vibrant and striking colors, especially intense yellow, figures with a sometimes primitive and childlike style, calligraphic elements, fantastical animals, ornamental letters formed with human figures, and architectural motifs of horseshoe arches and whimsical interlacing. This style evolved from an initial Byzantine-Merovingian influence to an Islamic-Carolingian character, incorporating elements from the Carolingian school and Islamic arabesques.

Prominent examples of Mozarabic painting include the Morgan Beatus, Tábara Beatus, Valcavado Beatus, and Gerona Beatus. Additionally, the León Bible of 920 and the León Bible of 960 are notable, with the latter considered one of the best-documented Mozarabic Bibles.

== Mozarabic sculpture ==
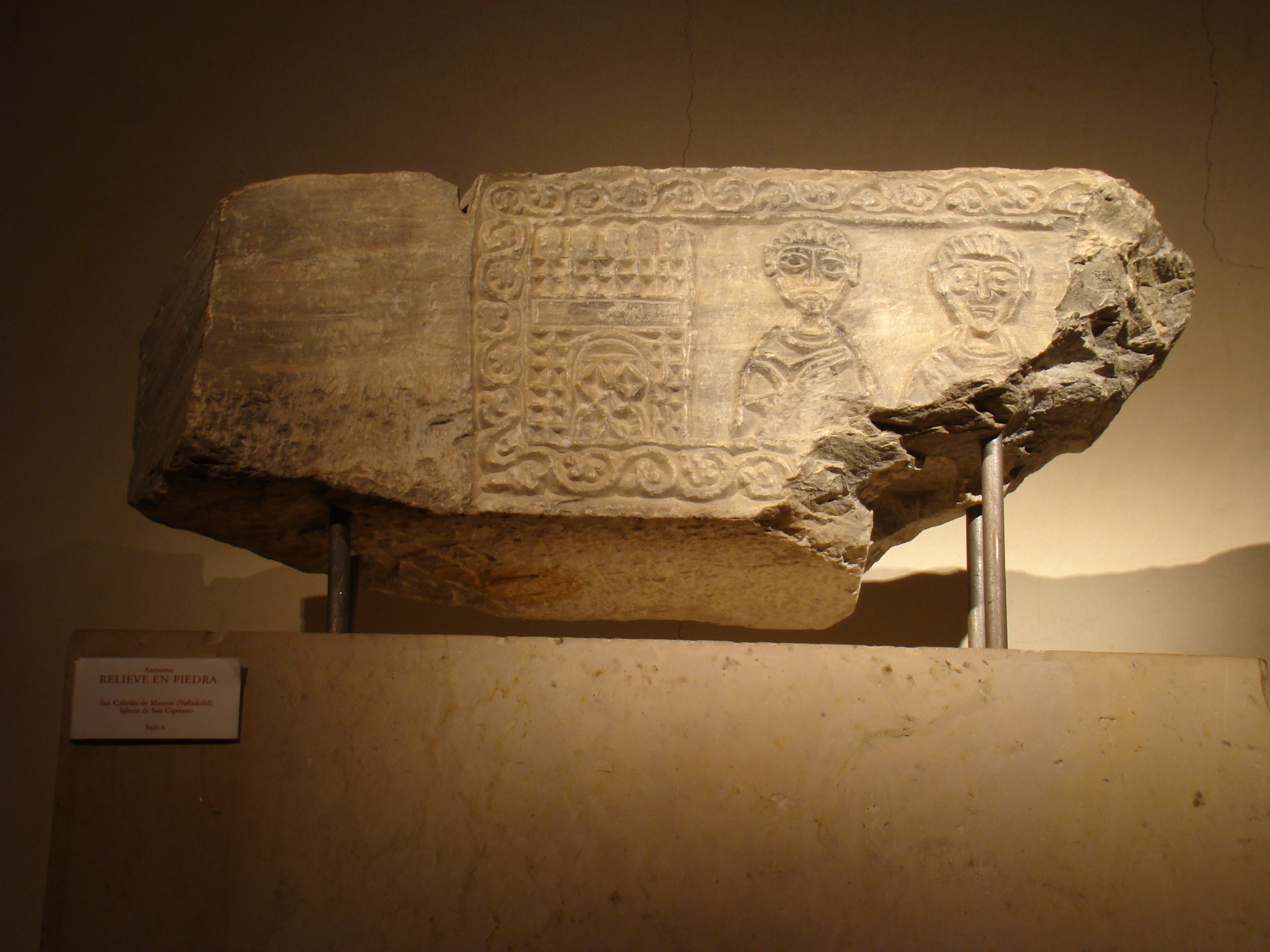
Stone block from San Cebrián de Mazote (10th century)

Mozarabic art sculpture is characterized by its flat nature, typically carved in bevel, following techniques used in earlier periods. Common themes are often of a vegetal and geometric nature, with few examples of figurative representations. This artistic expression is mainly found in capitals, with notable works of high quality such as those in San Miguel de Escalada or Santiago de Peñalba.

A distinctive feature of this era is the decoration of stone or wooden corbels supporting the roof overhang in various constructions. These corbels display decorative motifs, usually composed of geometric drawings inscribed in lobes, contributing to the unique stylistic identity of Mozarabic sculpture.

However, surviving sculpture from this period is scarce, with a notable exception being a rare bas-relief in San Cebrián de Mazote. Additionally, sculptural elements from San Millán de la Cogolla, such as ivories including the arms of a cross and a portable altar, have been found, highlighting the influence of Cordoban Caliphal art.

== Mozarabic or repoblación ==
Following the publication of Francisco Javier Simonet's work on the Mozarabs of Spain in 1897 and Manuel Gómez-Moreno's monograph on Mozarabic Churches in 1919, churches constructed in Christian territories from the late 9th to early 11th centuries were attributed the Mozarabic character. The term "Mozarabic" was employed to describe the architecture and related art. Despite gaining widespread acceptance, modern historiography has raised questions about the term "Mozarabic," suggesting alternatives such as "repopulation art" or "Leonese art." This has led to academic controversies regarding the most appropriate designation for this period. Despite these debates, the term "Mozarabic art" continues to be the most commonly used in academia and cultural discourse.

== Gallery ==
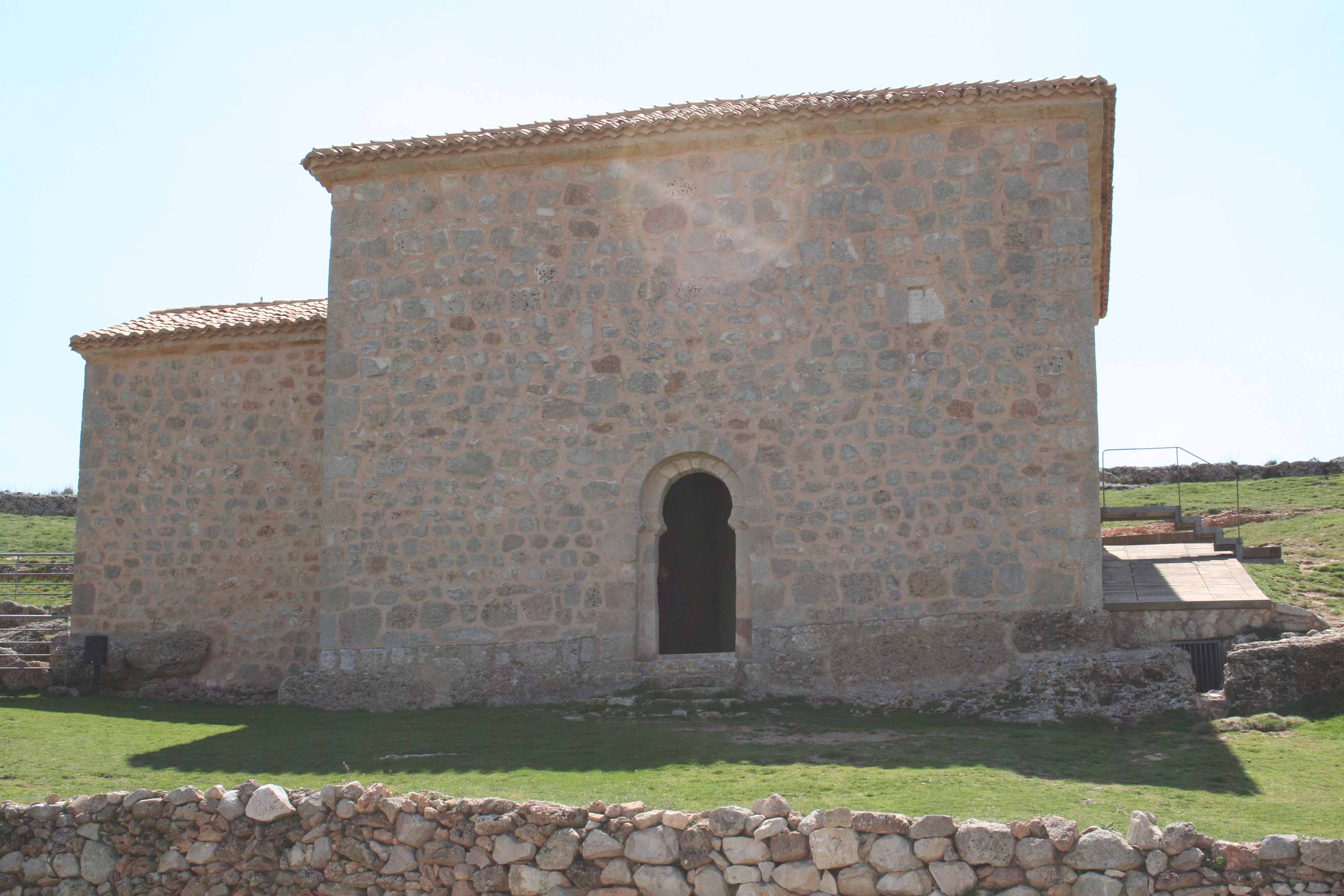
San Baudelio de Berlanga, Soria.

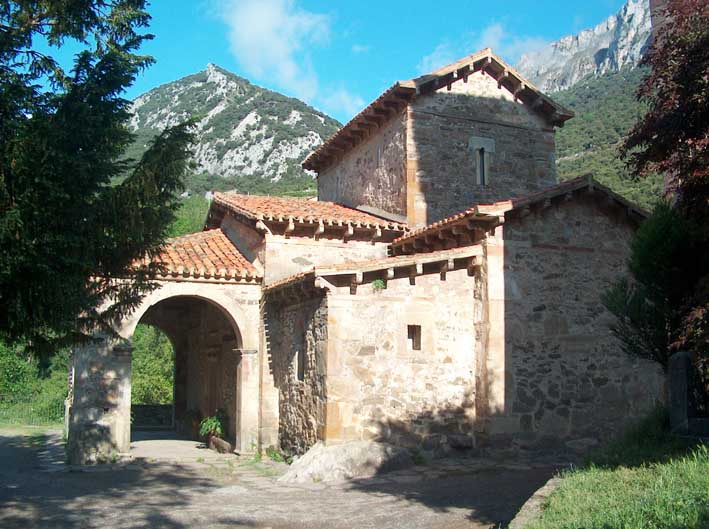
Santa María de Lebeña, Cantabria.

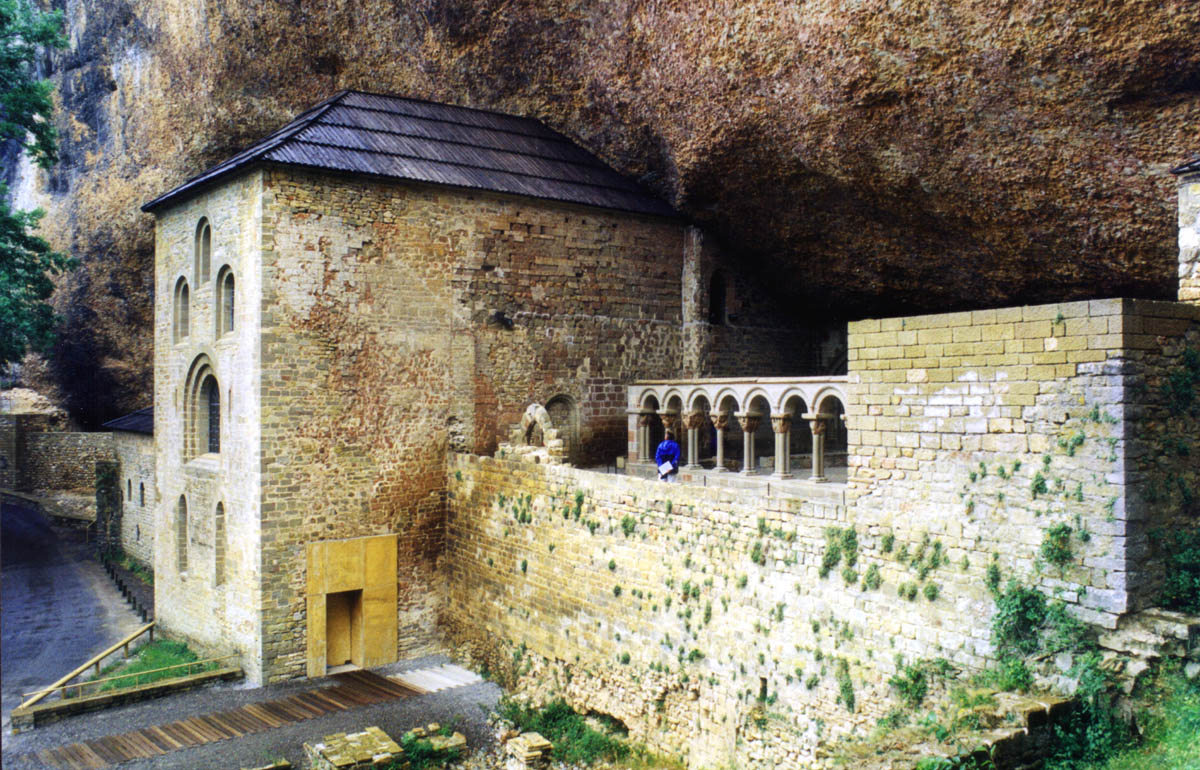
San Juan de la Peña, Aragón

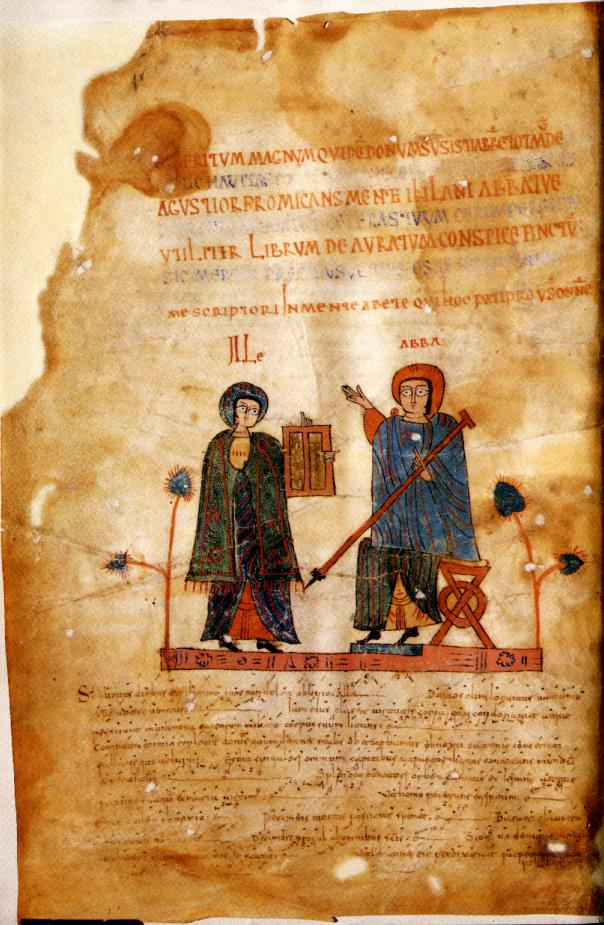
León Antiphonary Folio (11th century, León Cathedral)

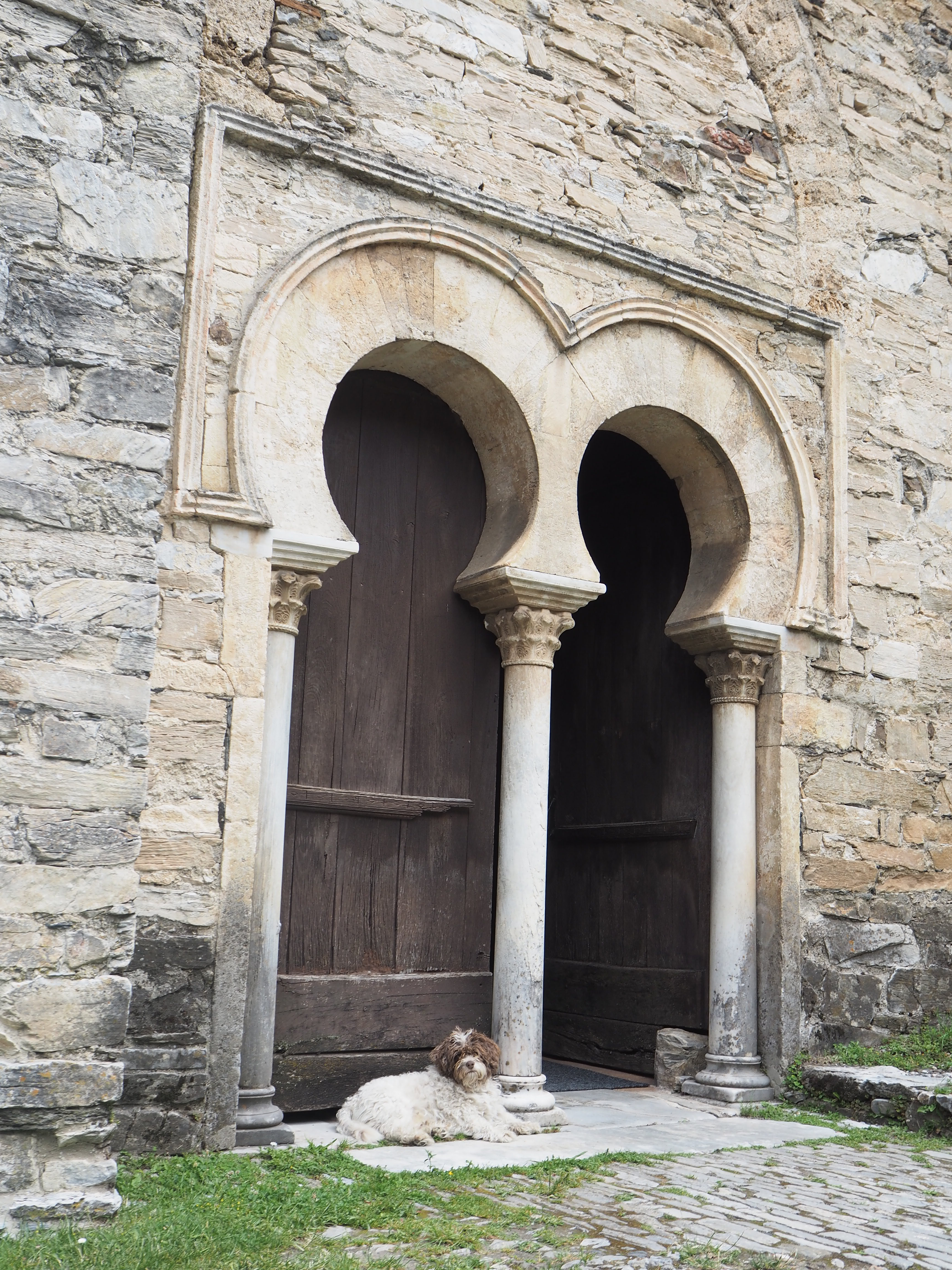
Mozarabic arches of Santiago de Peñalba (León)

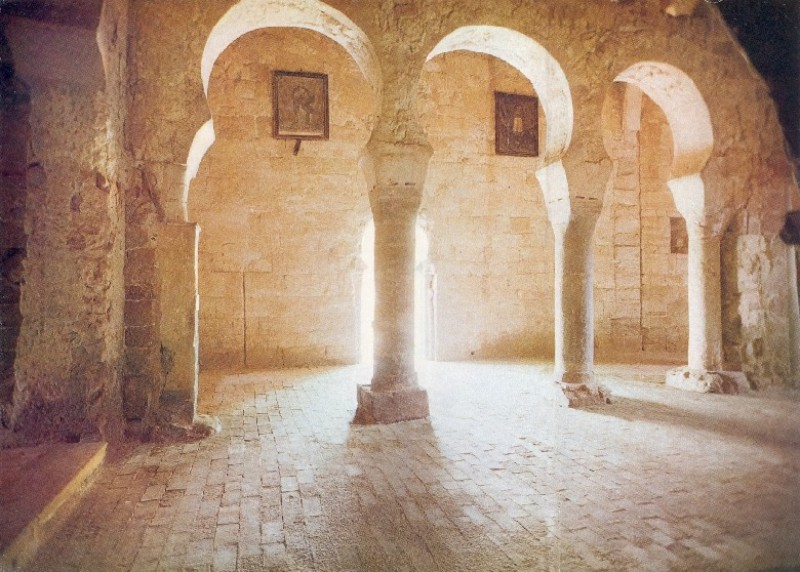
Inside of San Millán de Suso (La Rioja)

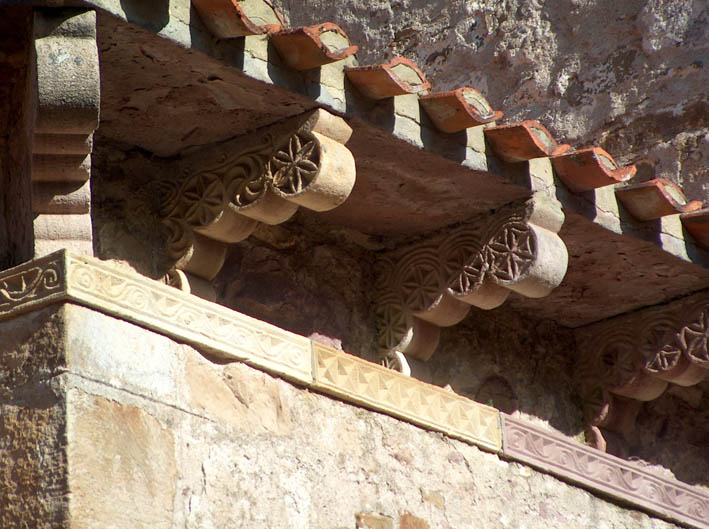
Santa María de Lebeña (Cantabria)

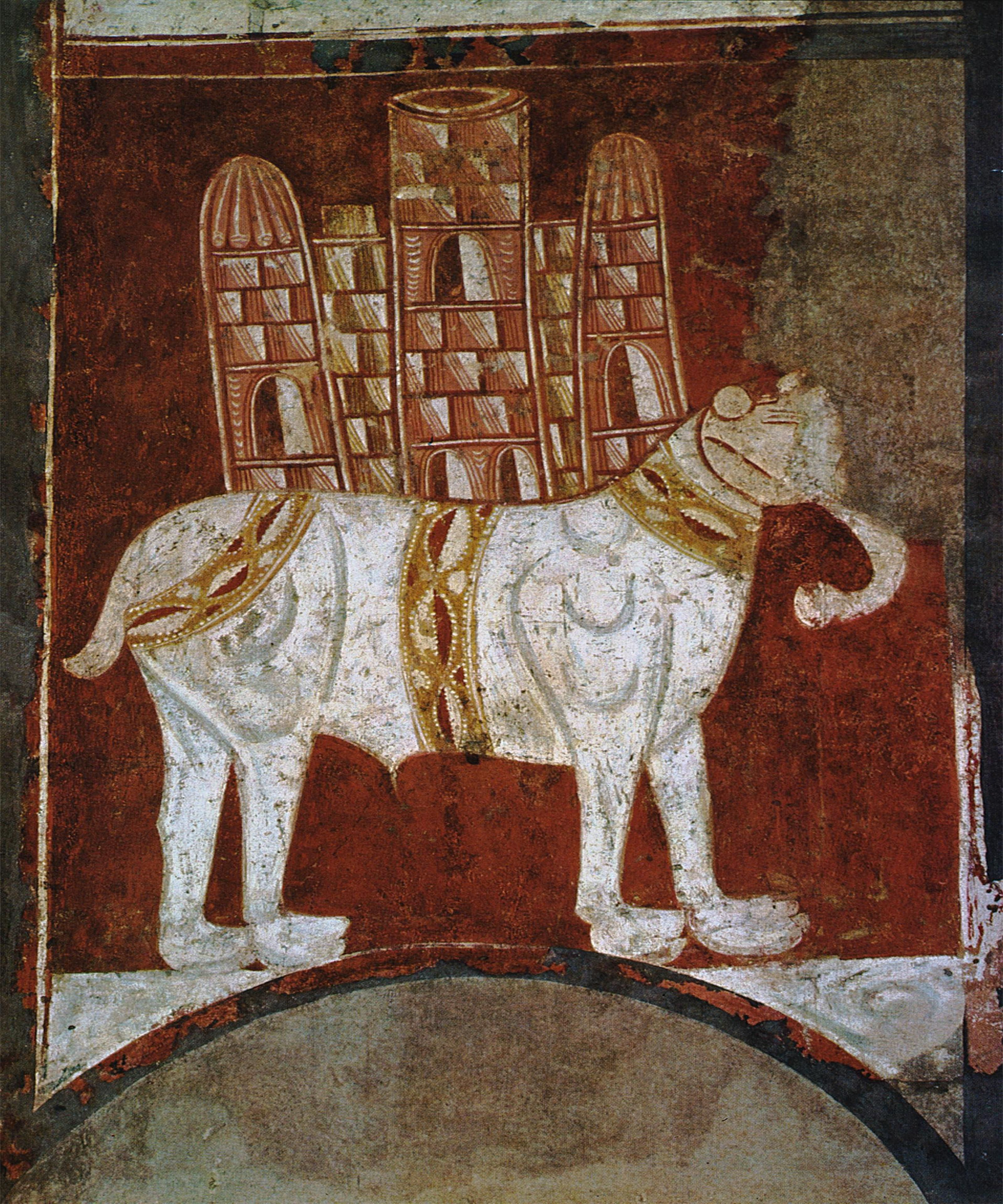
Painting: combat elephant, from San Baudelio de Berlanga (Soria)

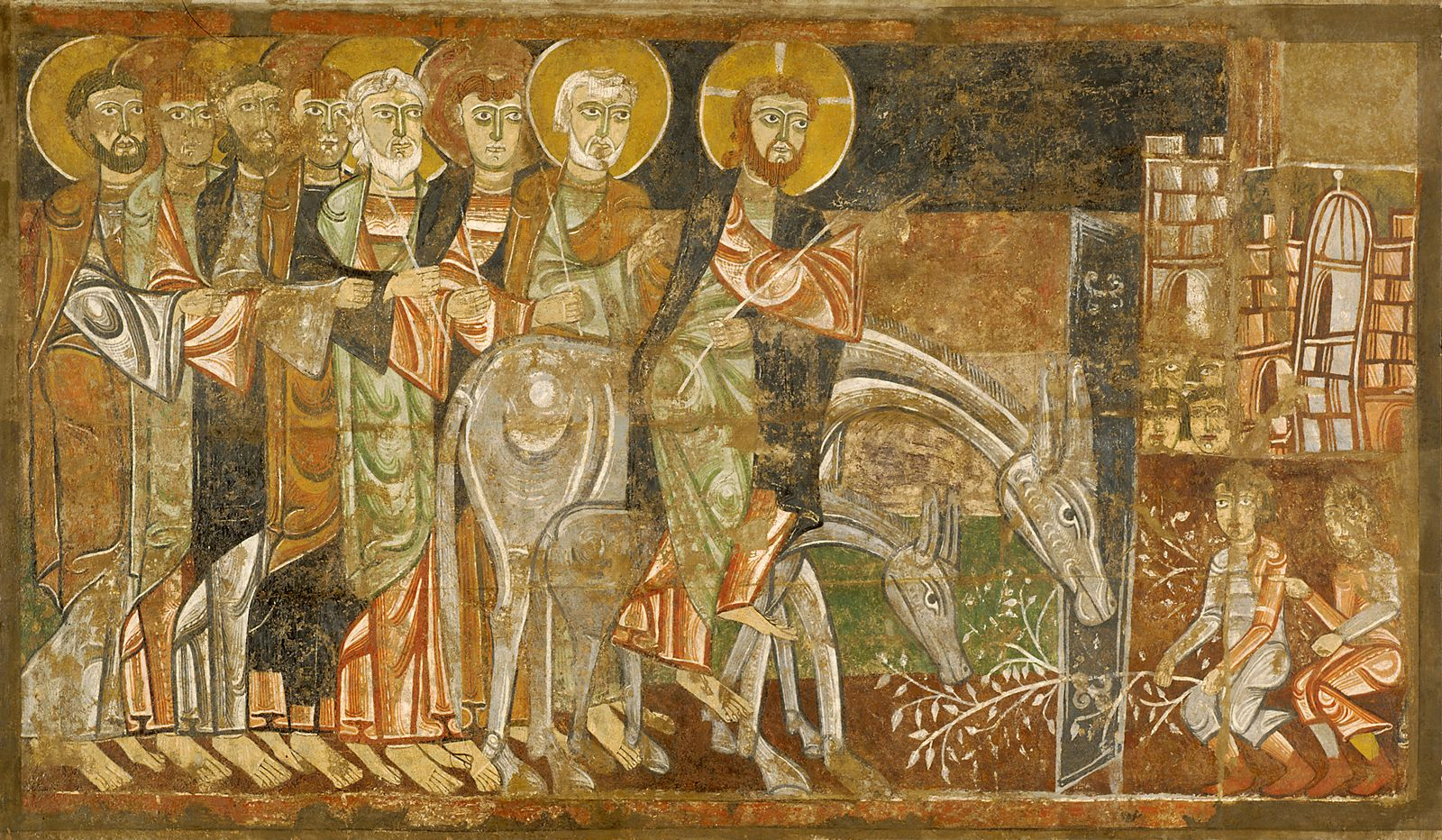
Entry of Christ into Jerusalem, from San Baudelio de Berlanga (Soria), now in Indianapolis

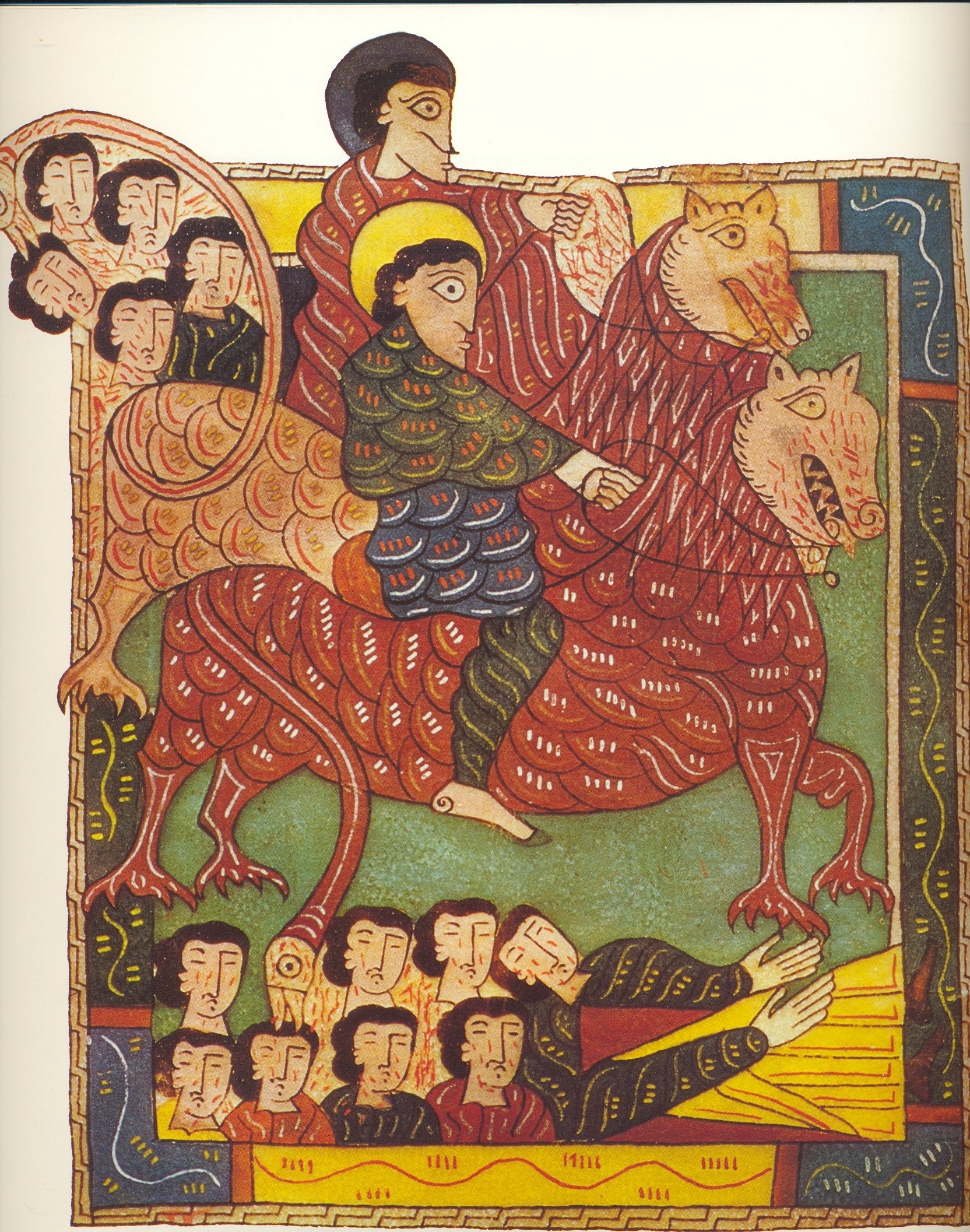
Art from the Escorial Beatus

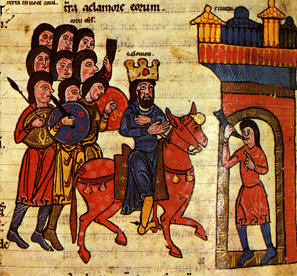
Leonese kingdom's interpretation of the Solomon's coronation from the 12th-century bible of San Isidoro de León, made in 1162.
