= Repopulation =

Repopulation is the phenomenon of increasing the numerical size of human inhabitants or organisms of a particular species after they had almost gone extinct.

== Organisms ==
An example of an organism that has repopulated after being on the brink of extinction is the Dryococelus australis.

== Humans ==
The repopulation of humans after a catastrophic event is a hypothetical concept that sometimes features in fictional as well as traditional literature. In this scenario, only two members of the opposite sex are survivors after some sort of calamity that has happened. This couple, the last two humans on Earth, ends up reproducing and their offspring reproduce with one another, until after a certain amount of time, the planet Earth has a sizeable number of people.

== See also ==
- Armageddon
- Great Deluge
- Repoblación
