= Repoblación =

Repopulation of the buffer zone between Christian and Muslim kingdoms in Spain

Map of Desert of the Duero

The Repoblación (Spanish: [repoβlaˈθjon], Galician: [repoβlaˈθjoŋ]; Portuguese: Repovoação, IPA: [ʁɛpuvuɐˈsɐ̃w]) was the ninth-century repopulating of a large region between the River Duero and the Cantabrian Mountains, which had been depopulated in the early years of the Reconquista and became known as the Desert of the Duero, although, despite its name, the region has never been completely depopulated as archaeological research has shown since there was a limited continuity of human occupation. It is also the designation for repopulation efforts by the Christian kingdoms of the Iberian Peninsula, in what would become modern-day Portugal and Spain, during all of the Reconquista (8th to 15th century).

In the reign of Alfonso I of Asturias (739–757), through a series of successful military campaigns against the Moors, the Christians had retaken Galicia, La Rioja, and León and brought the population of the northern regions firmly under their control. This left those provinces largely empty of human settlement and created a buffer zone between Moors and Christians. This region was called the Desert of the Duero. This zone was left untouched for almost a century while Alfonso's successors focused their energies on Vasconia and Galicia.

It was during the reign of Ordoño I of Asturias (850–866) that the repopulation of the uninhabited zone began. Ordoño began advancing to the south, repopulating the cities of Tui, Astorga, León, and Amaya. The people who descended the mountains of the north for the uninhabited valleys were called foramontanos, meaning "out of the mountains." Among the routes the foramontanos took was that between Cabuérniga and Campo de Suso, which was followed as early as 824, when the new population of Brañosera received the oldest known fuero in Spanish history. The desire for newer, more fertile agricultural zones in the river valleys of the Ebro and Duero was the chief driving factor in the migrations. Alfonso III (ruler from 886 to 910) reconquered the western strip as far as the Mondego and repopulated the areas of Portucale, Coimbra, Viseu, Lamego and León. From this time the kingdom increasingly became known as that of León and in 910, on the death of Ordoño's son, Alfonso III, the kingdom was divided with Fruela II continuing to reign in Asturias while his brothers García and Ordoño ruled in León and Galicia respectively. The city of León became the center of the kingdom in 914.

At the end of the 11th century, King Afonso VI of León reached the Tagus (1085), repeating the same policy of alliances and developing collaboration with Frankish knights. The repoblación was then complete. His aim was to create a Hispanic empire like the Visigothic Kingdom (418–720) to reclaim his hegemony over the peninsula. Within this context, the territory between the Douro and the Tagus was repopulated and a nucleus was formed in Portugal that wanted independence. This marks the beginning of the Portuguese Repovoação ou Repovoamento occurred during the reigns of the Portuguese House of Burgundy up to the middle of the thirteenth century.

== See also ==
- Repoblación art and architecture
- Faramontanos de Tábara
- Faramontaos
- Faramontáns
- Reconquest of Galicia
- Asturias in the Reconquista
