= San Cebrián de Mazote =

Coordinates: 41°41′N 5°09′W

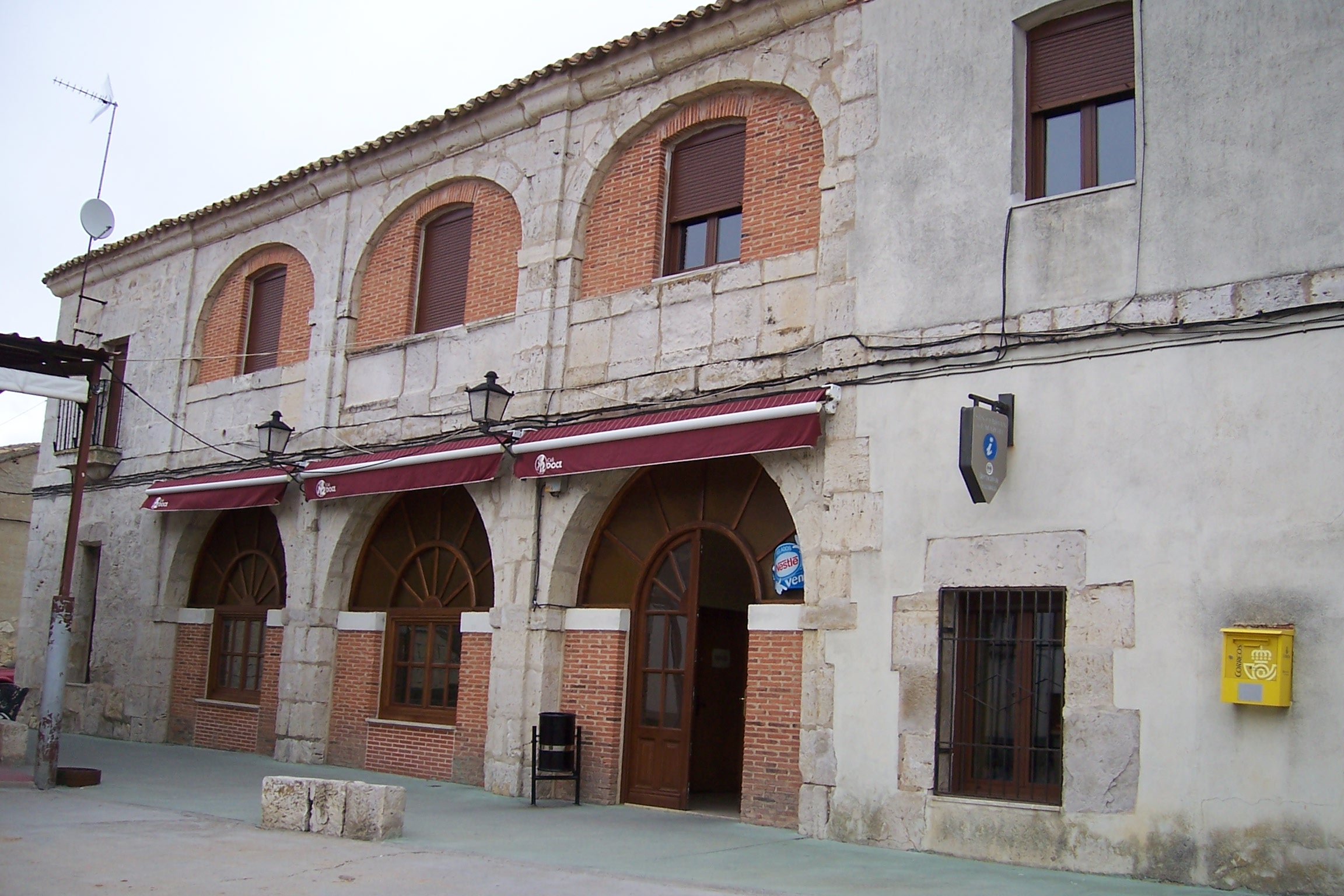
- Town Hall

- Coat of arms
- Interactive map of San Cebrián de Mazote
- Country: Spain
- Autonomous community: Castile and León
- Province: Valladolid
- Municipality: San Cebrián de Mazote

Area
  - Total: 35.43 km^{2} (13.68 sq mi)
- Elevation: 760 m (2,490 ft)

Population (2025-01-01)
  - Total: 99
  - Density: 2.8/km^{2} (7.2/sq mi)
- Time zone: UTC+1 (CET)
  - Summer (DST): UTC+2 (CEST)
- Climate: Csb

San Cebrián de Mazote is a municipality located in the province of Valladolid, Castile and León, Spain.

According to the 2004 census (INE), the municipality had a population of 200 inhabitants.

The village has a medieval church dedicated to a saint known as Cipriano or Cebrián (Cyprian in English). The architecture has been described as Mozarabic or Repoblación.
