= Faramontanos de Tábara =

Coordinates: 41°50′N 5°52′W

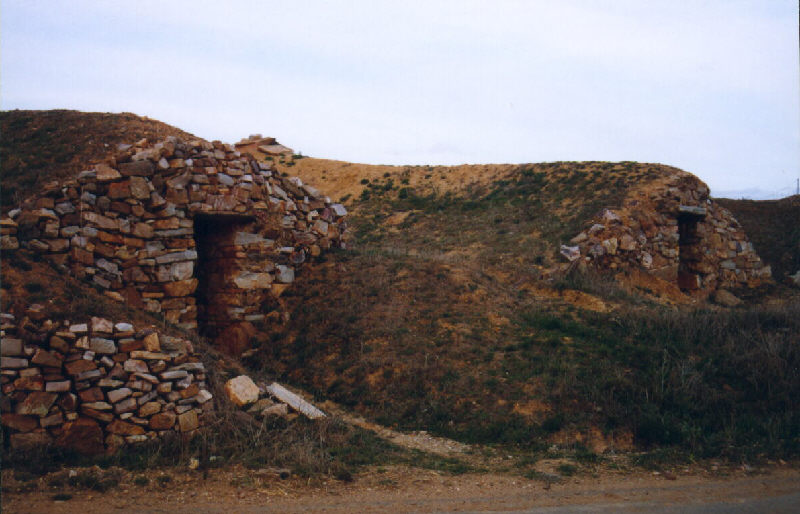
- Interactive map of Faramontanos de Tábara
- Country: Spain
- Autonomous community: Castile and León
- Province: Zamora
- Municipality: Faramontanos de Tábara

Area
  - Total: 54 km^{2} (21 sq mi)

Population (2025-01-01)
  - Total: 318
  - Density: 5.9/km^{2} (15/sq mi)
- Time zone: UTC+1 (CET)
  - Summer (DST): UTC+2 (CEST)

Faramontanos de Tábara is a municipality located in the province of Zamora, Castile and León, Spain. According to the 2009 census (INE), the municipality has a population of 435 inhabitants.
