= Santo Tomás de las Ollas =

Hermitage in Spain

Coordinates: 42°33′20″N 6°34′44″W

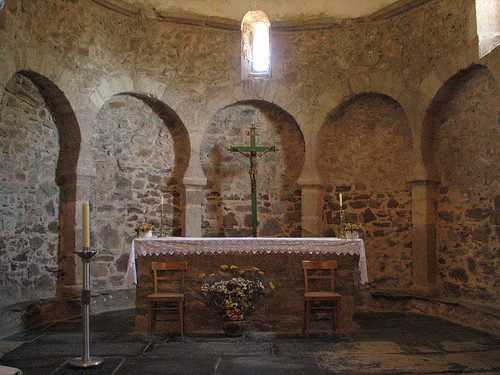
Horseshoe arches in the principal chapel (apse).

The Santo Tomás de las Ollas hermitage is situated in the town with the same name close to Ponferrada, León (Spain).

== History ==
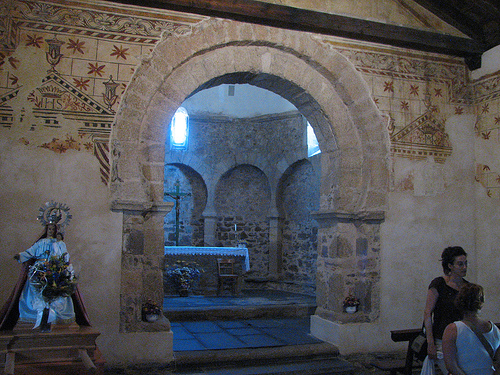
Double horseshoe arch which separates the principal chapel from the nave.

The name of the hermitage means 'Saint Thomas of the Pots'. It is taken from the town Santo Tomás de las Ollas (St. Thomas of the Ollas), which comes from the main occupation of that locality: pottery. They supplied to the Valle del Silencio zone.

The building was documented as far back as 1183.

The hermitage was donated to the community of San Pedro de Montes monastery by the Bishop of Astorga.

== Architecture ==
The building is of Mozarabic design, and was originally 13.40m by 7.30m with an apse; it was reconstructed in the 17th century. More work in the 1800s has extended the building.

The building was declared as a national Asset of Cultural Interest in 1931.

== See also ==
- Early medieval domes
