= Alfiz =

Architectural adornment around an arch

The alfiz (Spanish: [alˈfiθ], from Andalusi Arabic الحِيْز alḥíz, from Standard Arabic الحَيِّز alḥáyyiz, meaning 'the container';) is an architectural adornment, consisting of a moulding, usually a rectangular panel, which encloses the outward side of an arch. It is an architectonic ornament of Etruscan origin, used in Visigothic, Asturian, Moorish, Mozarabic, Mudéjar and Isabelline Gothic architecture.

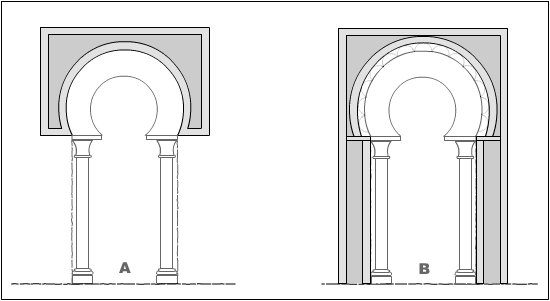
Types of Alfiz.

It is frequent in the Islamic Hispanic art and Mozarabic art (usually in connection with the horseshoe arch). As the image illustrates, there are two alfiz variants:

1. Alfiz starting from the impost.
2. Alfiz starting from the floor.

The space between the arch and the alfiz is called enjuta or arrabá, usually richly decorated (iron-gray in the illustration). Each curved triangle is called albanega (spandrel).
