= Penalba =

Penalba or Peñalba may refer to

- Peñalba, a municipality in Spain
- Peñalba de Ávila, a municipality in Spain
- Palace of Cienfuegos de Peñalba in Spain
- Santiago de Peñalba, a church in Spain
  - Cross of Peñalba, a 10th-century votive cross related to Santiago de Peñalba
- Alicia Penalba (1918–1982), Argentine sculptor, tapestry designer, and weaver
- Borja Penalba (born 1975), Spanish composer, record producer, arranger and musician
- Gabriel Peñalba (born 1984), Argentine football midfielder
- Gaby Peñalba, Spanish film editor
