= May 25 (Eastern Orthodox liturgics) =

Day in the Eastern Orthodox liturgical calendar

Eastern Orthodox liturgical calendar
May 24	May 25	May 26
May 25 O.S. ≍ June 7 N.S. May 25 N.S ≍ May 12 O.S.

An Eastern Orthodox cross

May 25 in Eastern Orthodox liturgical calendars is a feast day and a day of commemoration of saints and martyrs. Although some Orthodox churches use the Revised Julian Calendar and others use the traditional Julian calendar, the fixed commemorations for their respective May 25 are broadly the same, no matter which calendar is used. (Note: Despite the dates being the same, the days to which they refer typically differ by 13 days. The notation Old Style or O.S. is sometimes used to indicate a date in the traditional Julian Calendar (the "Old Calendar"). The notation New Style or N.S. indicates a date in the Revised Julian calendar (the "New Calendar").)

== Feasts ==
- Third Finding of the Precious Head of Saint John the Baptist (c. 850)

== Saints ==
- Martyrs Pasicrates, Valentinian, Julius and others, at Dorostolum (302)
- Hieromartyr Therapontus, Bishop of Cyprus (4th century)
- Saint Olbian (Albianos), monk. (see also: May 29)
- Venerable Dodo of the St David-Gareji Monastery, Georgia (6th century) (see also: May 17)

== Pre-Schism Western saints ==
- Hieromartyr Urban, Pope of Rome (230)
- Martyr Celestine, in Rome, severely tortured with hot irons.
- Saint Dionysios (Dionysius Mariani, Denis), Bishop of Milan (359)
- Hieromartyrs Maximus and Victorinus, brothers martyred near Évreux, France (c. 384)
- Saint Zenobius, first Bishop of Florence (390)
- Saint Leo of Troyes (Saint-Lyé), monk who succeeded St Romanus as Abbot of Mantenay near Troyes, France (c. 550)
- Saints Injuriosus and Scholastica, a married couple in the Auvergne in France who lived in virginity and holiness (c. 550)
- Saint Aldhelm, Bishop of Sherborne (709)
- Saint Dúnchad mac Cinn Fáelad (Dunchadh), the eleventh Abbot of Iona (707–717) in Scotland (717)
- Venerable Bede the Confessor, Hieromonk of Wearmouth-Jarrow (735) (see also: May 27 - East)
- Hieromartyrs Gerbald, Reginhard, Winebald and Worad, of the Monastery of St Bertin in France, all martyred by the Danes (862)
- Saint Egilhard, eighth abbot of Cornelimünster near Aachen in Germany, martyred by Vikings at Bercheim (881)
- Saint Gennadius of Astorga, Bishop of Astorga, later a hermit (936)

== Post-Schism Orthodox saints ==
- Saint Skiota of Georgia (c. 13th century)
- Saint Dmitry, Price of Uglich, son of Andrey Vasilyevich (c. 1540) (Note: See: (in Russian): Дмитрий Андреевич. Википедии. (Russian Wikipedia).)
- Saint Thekla of Pereyaslavl, nun, (mother of St. Daniel, Abbot of Pereyaslavl-Zalesski +1540) (16th century)
- Saint Thaddeus, Archimandrite, of Svatogorsk Monastery (1758)
- Saint Innocent (Borisov), Archbishop of Cherson and Taurica (Note: (in Greek) "Ἐπισκόπος Χερσῶνος καὶ πάσης Ταυρίδος.") (1857) (Note: See: (in Russian) Иннокентий (Борисов). Википедии. (Russian Wikipedia).)
- Synaxis of the Saints of Volhynia:
  - Yaropolk, Stephen, Macarius, Igor and Juliana.

=== New martyrs and confessors ===
- Virgin-Martyr Elena (Korobkova) (1938)
- New Martyr Tavrion (Tolokontsev), Monk, of Veliki Ustiug (1939)
- 1,290 New Martyrs of Piva, Montenegro, killed by the Nazis (1943) (Note: "...There were canonized victims of crime in the Piva region, whose villages from 6 to 12 June 1943, Nazi "Prince Eugen Division", which included a large number of ethnic Volks-Germans and Bosnian Ustashas, killed 1,290 innocent people, including 549 children and young people up to 20 years of age. Only in the village of Dola, on June 7, 1943, - 522 weak persons were shot, out of which 109 children under the age of 15. Dola village, as the largest execution place in this area, became a place of a universal remembrance of the Piva Martyrs. Their remembrance day will be the 7th of June.")

== Other commemorations ==
- Commemoration of the Reunion of 3,000,000 Uniates with the Orthodox Church at Vilnius in 1831 (1831)
- Repose of recluse George of Zadonsk (Stratonicus in monasticism) (1836) (Note: See: (in Russian) Георгий Задонский. Википедии. (Russian Wikipedia).)
- Finding of the holy icon of Saint Demetrios the Myrrh-gusher, in Ermoupolis on the island of Syros, in the Cyclades, Greece (1936)

== Icon gallery ==
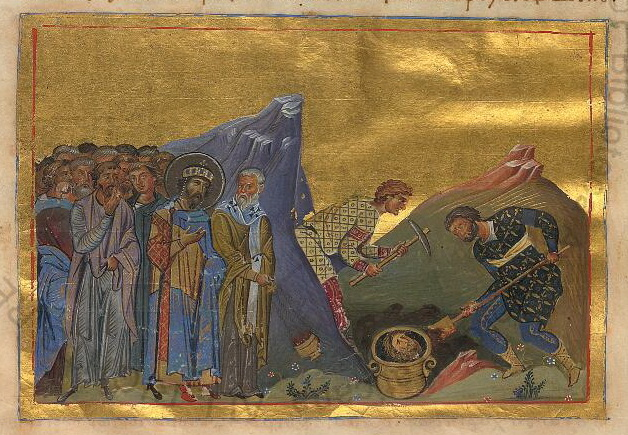
Finding of the Precious Head of Saint John the Baptist (Menologion of Basil II)

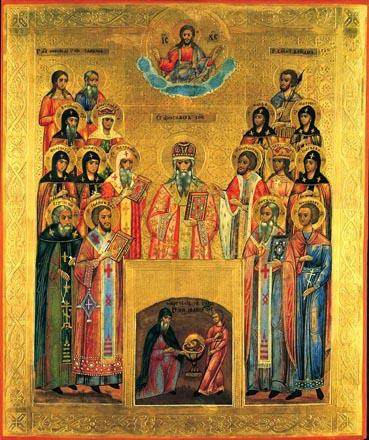
Icon of the Third Finding of the Head of John the Forerunner (Konetz, 19th century, Russia)

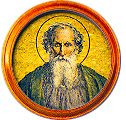
A portrait of Pope Saint Urban I.

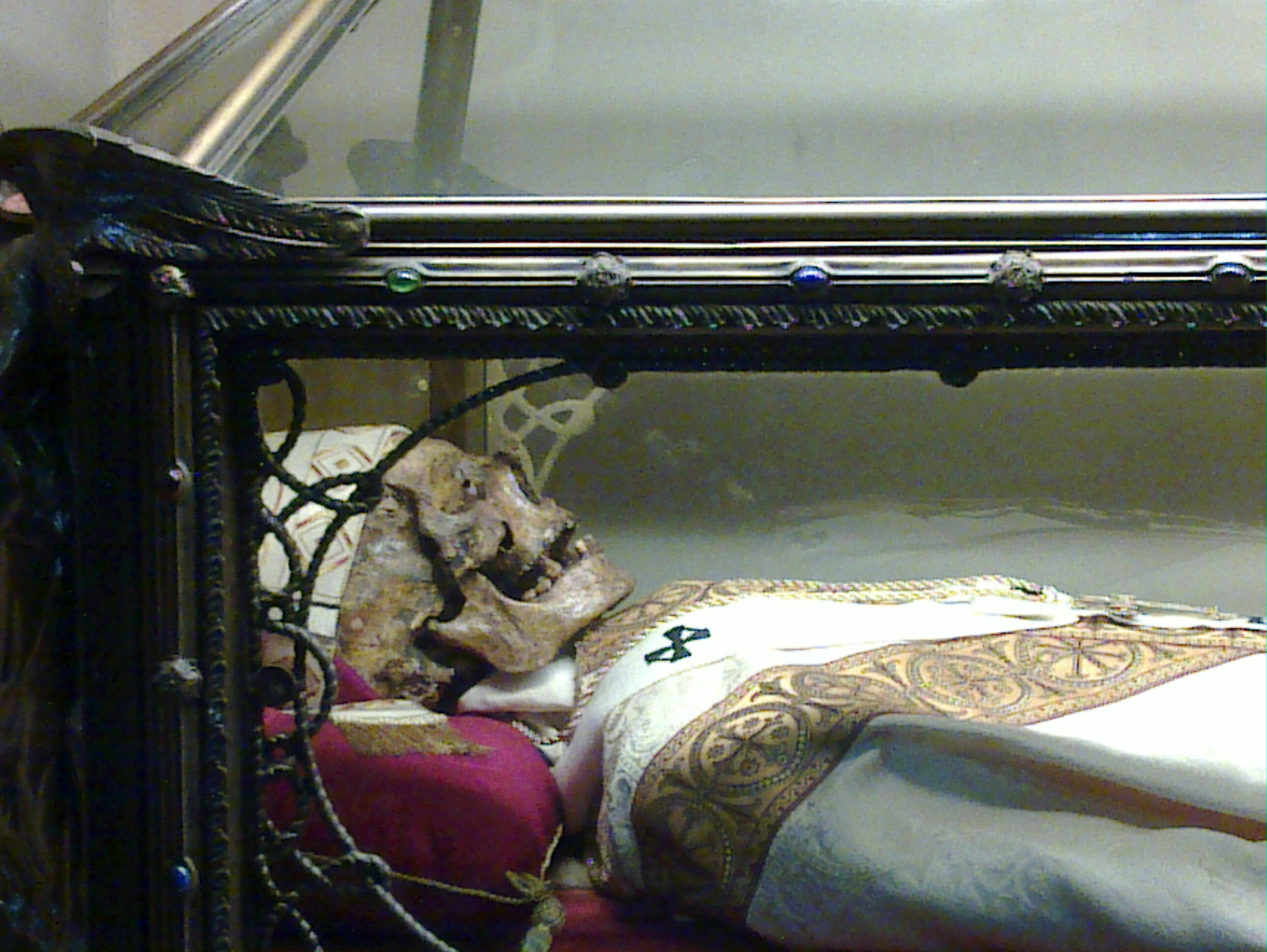
Relics of Saint Dionysius, Bishop of Milan (Cathedral of Milan).

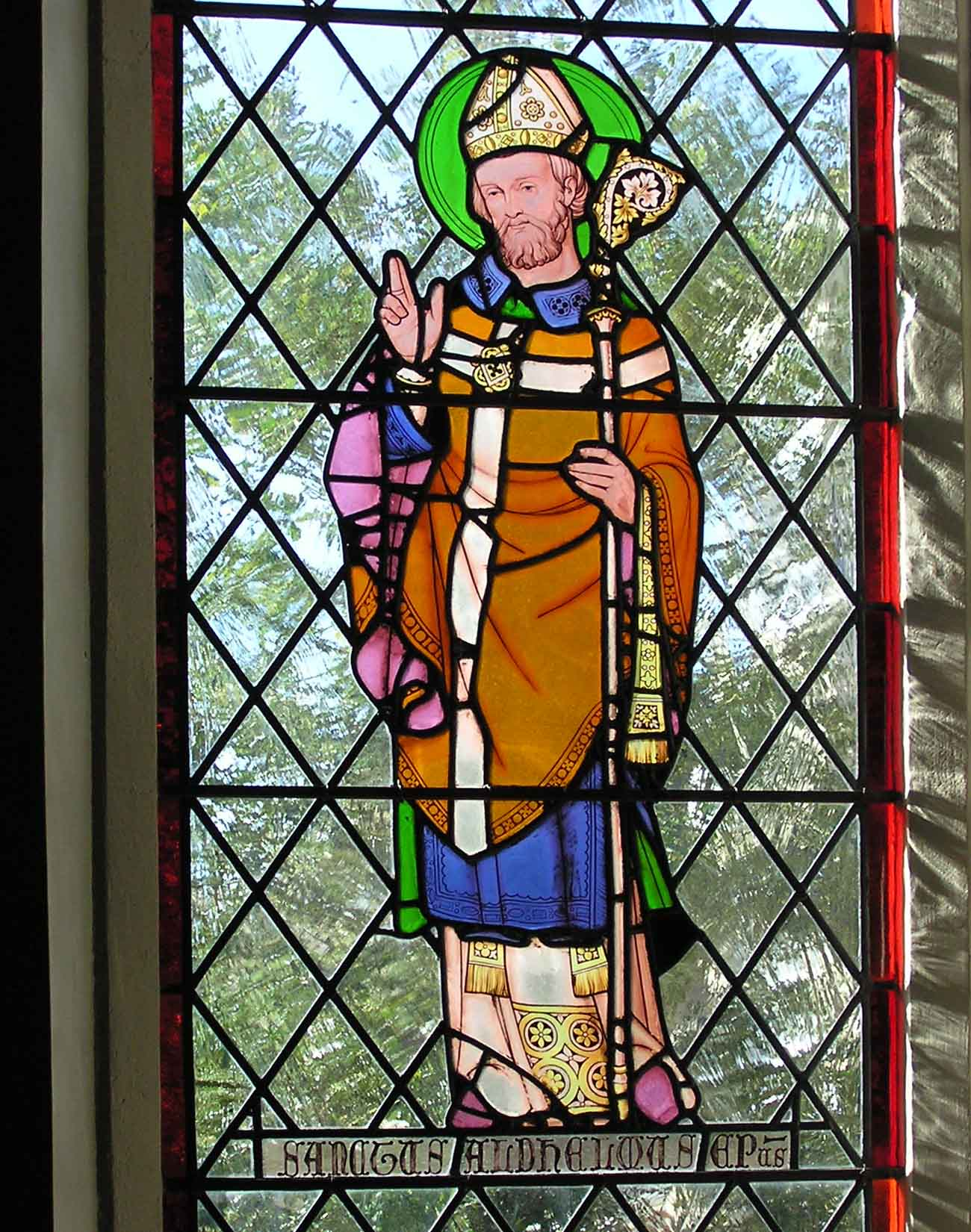
St. Stained glass window of St. Aldhelm, installed in St Aldhelm's Catholic Church, Malmesbury.

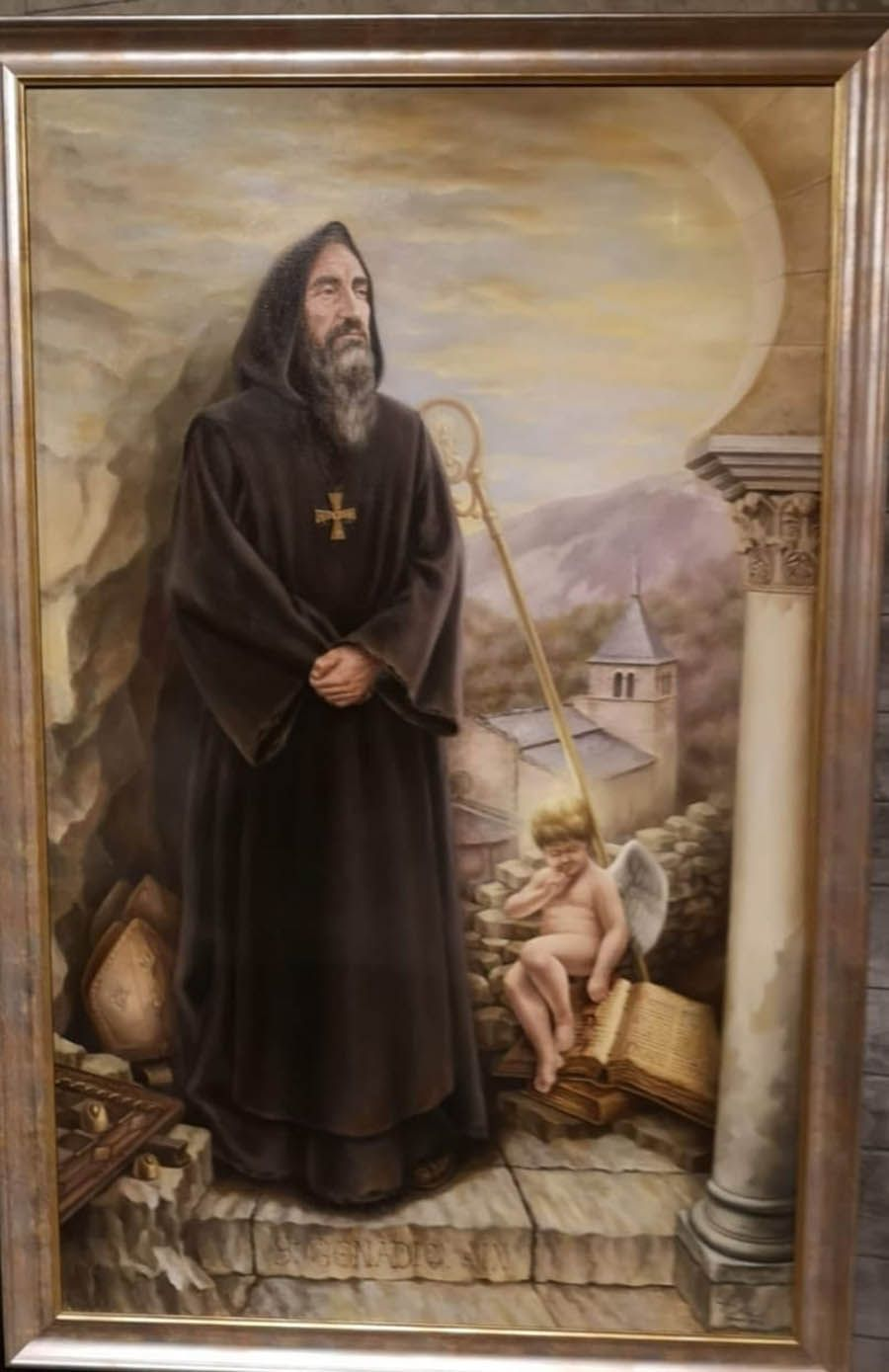
St. Gennadius of Astorga.

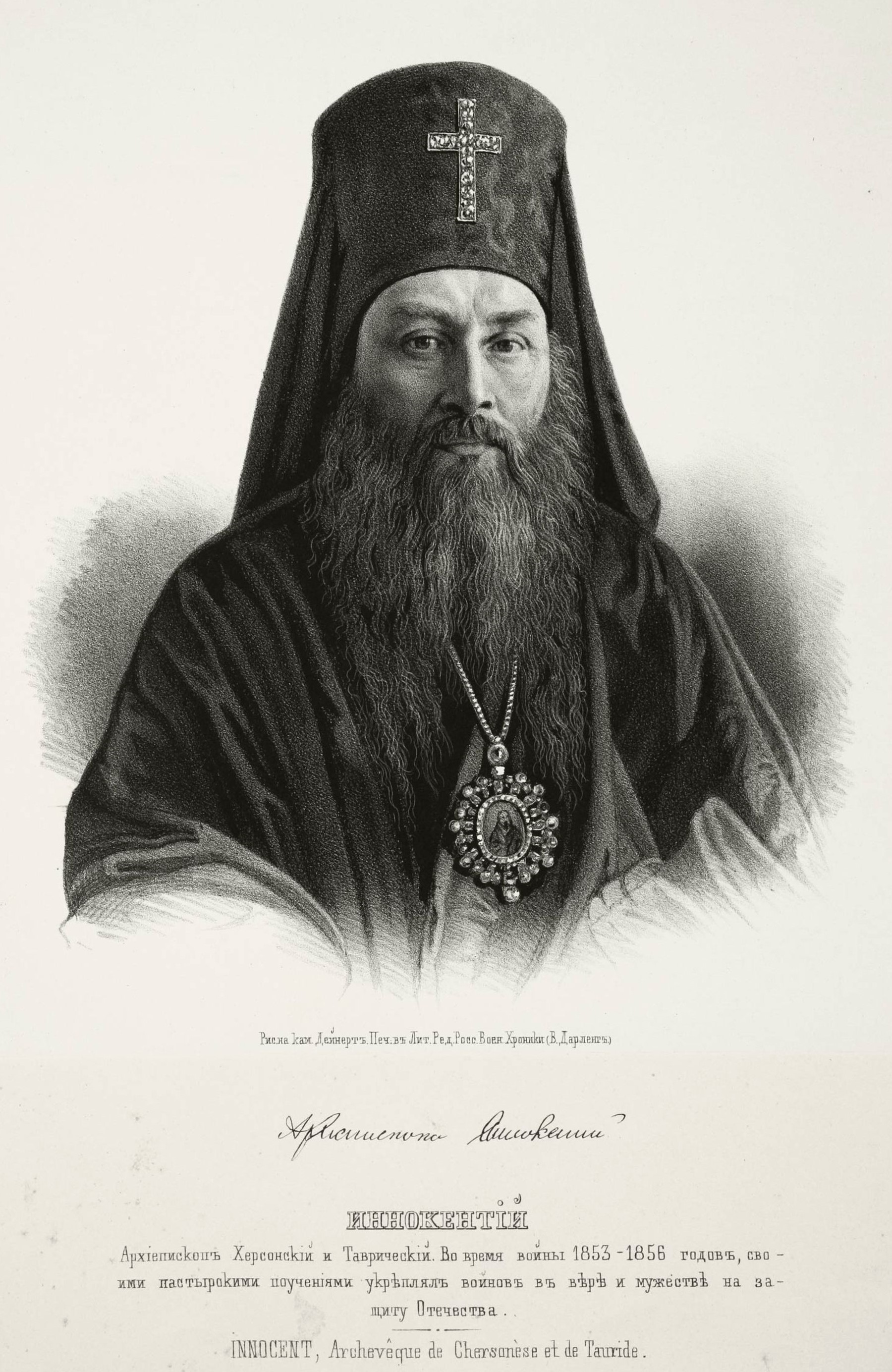
St. Innocent, Archbishop of Cherson and Taurica.

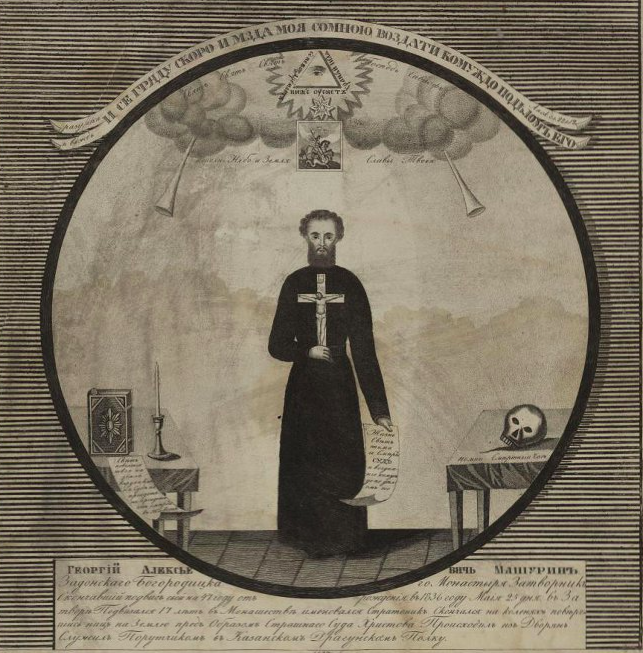
Recluse George of Zadonsk, of the Zadonsk Nativity of the Mother of God Monastery.

== Sources ==
- May 25/June 7. Orthodox Calendar (ORTHOCHRISTIAN.COM).
- June 7/May 25. HOLY TRINITY RUSSIAN ORTHODOX CHURCH (A parish of the Patriarchate of Moscow).
- May 25. OCA - The Lives of the Saints.
- May 25. Latin Saints of the Orthodox Patriarchate of Rome.
- May 25. The Roman Martyrology.

Greek Sources

- Great Synaxaristes: (in Greek) 25 ΜΑΪΟΥ. ΜΕΓΑΣ ΣΥΝΑΞΑΡΙΣΤΗΣ.
- (in Greek) Συναξαριστής. 25 Μαΐου. ECCLESIA.GR. (H ΕΚΚΛΗΣΙΑ ΤΗΣ ΕΛΛΑΔΟΣ).

Russian Sources

- (in Russian) 7 июня (25 мая). Православная Энциклопедия под редакцией Патриарха Московского и всея Руси Кирилла (электронная версия). (Orthodox Encyclopedia - Pravenc.ru).
- (in Russian) 25 мая (ст.ст.) 7 июня 2013 (нов. ст.). Русская Православная Церковь Отдел внешних церковных связей. (DECR).
