= Cross of Peñalba =

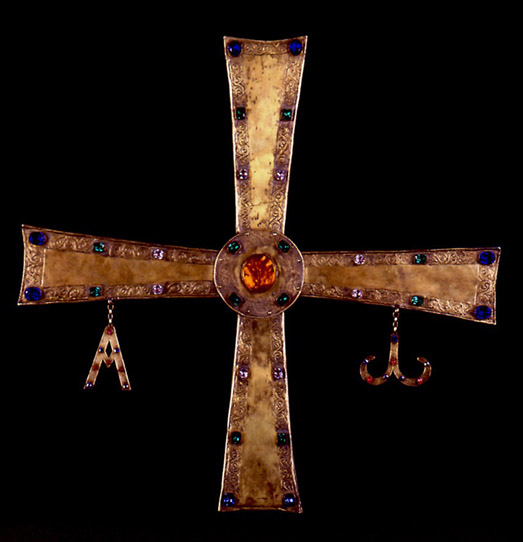
Cross of Peñalba, a 10th century Mozarabic piece

The Cross of Peñalba is a 10th-century votive cross given by Ramiro II of Leon to Genadio of Astorga, abbot of the monastery of Santiago de Peñalba, in gratitude for the assistance of St James in the Battle of Simancas in 939 against Abd-ar-Rahman III.

Today, the Cross of Peñalba is reclaimed as one of the main symbols of identity for the region of El Bierzo, prominently featured at the center of its coat of arms and flag.

== Bibliography ==
- García Gómez, Emilio (1950). Una Crónica anónima de Abd al-Rahman III al-Nasir. Consejo Superior de Investigaciones Científicas. ISBN 978-84-00-00271-8
- Sánchez-Albornoz, Claudio (1969). León y su historia: miscelánea histórica. Tomo I. Centro de Estudios e Investigación San Isidoro/Patronato José María Cuadrado. ISBN 978-84-87667-56-5
- Grau Lobo, Luis A. (1993). Cruz votiva de Santiago de Peñalba. Instituto de Estudios Bercianos/Museo de León.
- Rodríguez Fernández, Justiniano (1998). Ramiro II, rey de León. La Olmeda. ISBN 978-84-89915-01-5
- Menéndez Pidal, Marcelino (2011). Historia de España. El Buey Mudo. ISBN 978-84-938040-9-1
