= Peñalba de Ávila =

- municipality
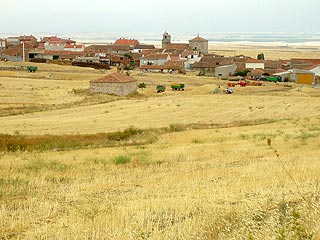
- View of Peñalba de Ávila from the north

- Location in Spain. Peñalba de Ávila (Spain)
- Coordinates: 40°46′19″N 4°44′46″W
- Country: Spain
- Autonomous community: Castile and León
- Province: Ávila
- Municipality: Peñalba de Ávila

Area
  - Total: 23 km^{2} (8.9 sq mi)

Population (2025-01-01)
  - Total: 104
  - Density: 4.5/km^{2} (12/sq mi)
- Website: www.penalbadeavila.es

Peñalba de Ávila is a municipality located in the province of Ávila, Castile and León, Spain.

Peñalba de Ávila is 17 kilometres (11 mi) from Madrid. It comprises 23 square kilometres (8.9 sq mi) of surface area and its altitude is 1,073 metres (3,520 ft) above sea level.

== Population ==
The population of Peñalba de Ávila has shown a steady decline since 1900. The largest population in the municipality was in 1910 when the population was 354 inhabitants.

Historical population
| Year | Pop. | ±% p.a. |
|---|---|---|
| 2023 | 103 | — |
| 2024 | 105 | +1.94% |
| 2025 | 104 | −0.95% |
Source: INE
