= Santiago de Peñalba =

Coordinates: 42.4272°N 6.54083°W

- Church of Santiago de Peñalba
- Spanish: Iglesia de Santiago de Peñalba
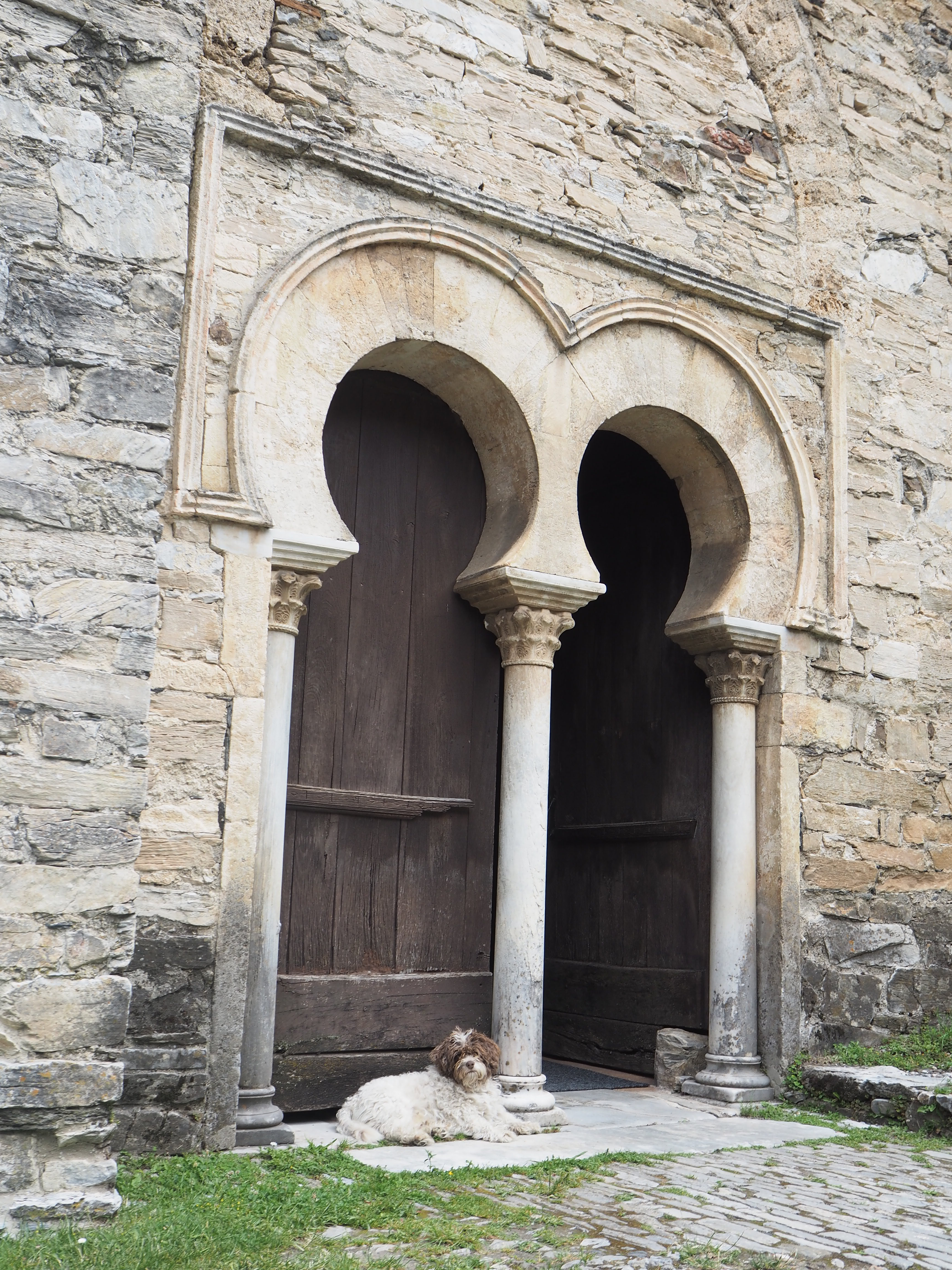
- Santiago de Peñalba
- Location: Peñalba de Santiago, El Bierzo (Province of León)
- Country: Spain
- Denomination: Catholic Church

History
- Dedication: James the Great
- Consecrated: 937

Architecture
- Heritage designation: Bien de Interés Cultural (BIC)
- Architectural type: Mozarabic arquitecture
- Style: Mozarabic

The church of Santiago de Peñalba is located in the town of Peñalba de Santiago, belonging to the municipality of Ponferrada, in the region of El Bierzo (Castilla y León, Spain). It is one of the most representative architectural gems of pre-Romanesque Mozarabic art. Built at the beginning of the 10th century on the initiative of Genadio of Astorga, it was inaugurated in the year 937 by his disciple Abbot Solomon. The church is the only building that remains of a monastic complex that has now disappeared.

This mountainous area, full of hermit monasteries and churches since the 7th century, deserved in its time the name of "Tebaida berciana". Its location in the center of the Montes Aquilanos, the most rugged area of the Montes de León, facilitated the isolation sought by the ascetic saints of the 8th, 9th and 10th centuries, such as San Fructuoso and San Genadio. The figure of San Genadio is relevant, insofar as he is considered the promoter of the spiritual and eremitical renaissance of El Bierzo area.

It has been declared a Site of Cultural Interest (BIC) and has been a National Historic-Artistic Monument since 1931.

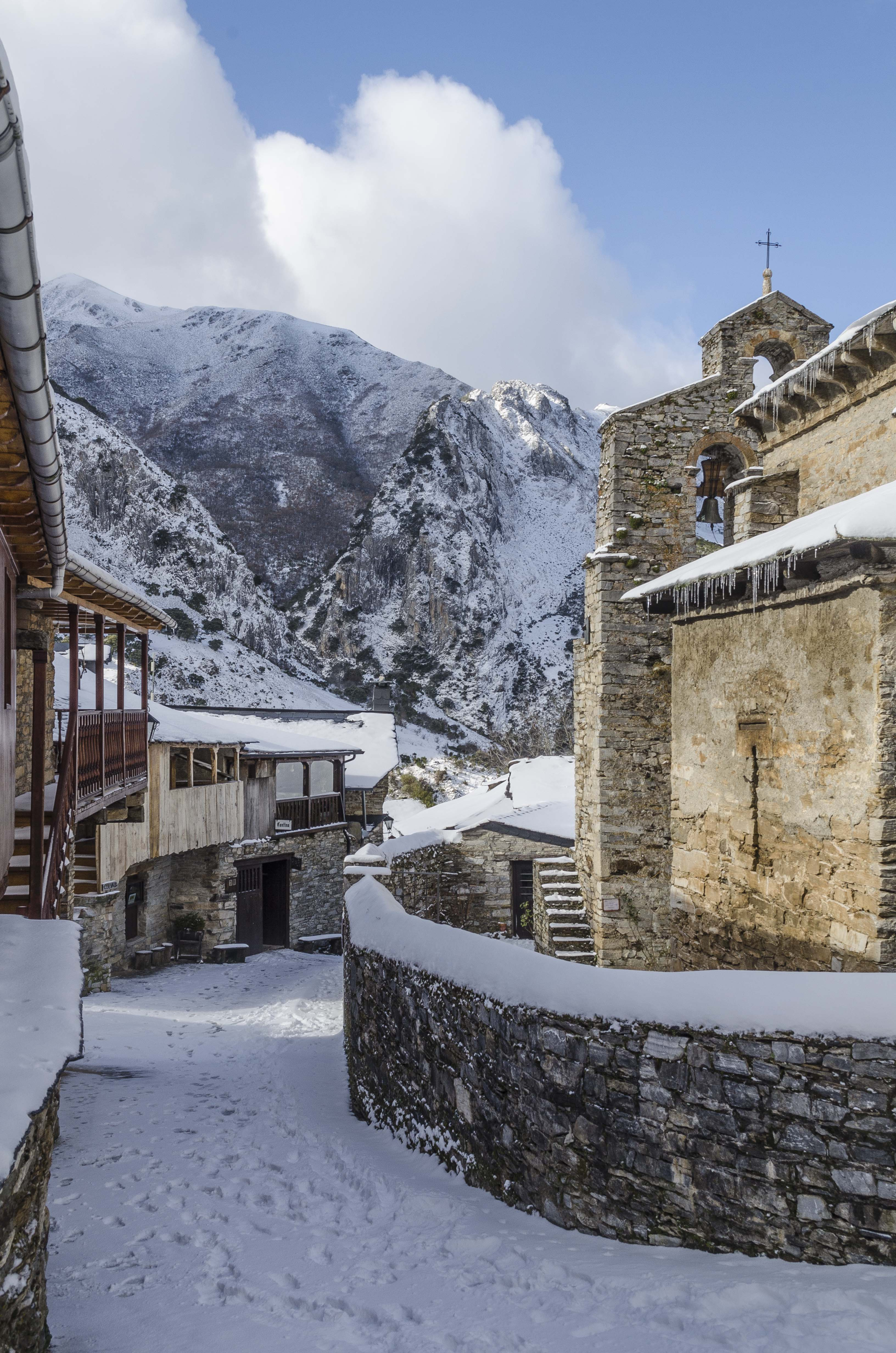
Santiago de Peñalba

== History ==
The kingdom of León was, from its birth, a political space of meetings and disagreements inhabited by a "border society", which had its own aesthetic concept. The art of the kingdom of León is a unique, singular art, for a simple reason: because it was a very plural society, rich in cultural nuances, and in constant transformation. It is in this context of «medieval coexistence» - Christian, Jewish and Muslim - in which the territories changed their dimensions and status almost from one day to the next due to Muslim «razzias», Christian «riots» and pacts, in which the origin of Santiago de Peñalba is located.

The church of Santiago de Peñalba was designed by a Christian mind, that of San Genadio; it was planned by another Christian mind, that of Solomon, but built and decorated by an Arabized Christian community that included excellent master builders, painters and sculptors. Everything points to the fact that whoever worked in the church was a specialized and organized workshop, whether they were muladí, ex-muladí or Islamic, from Al-Andalus. It was the splendid time of the monastery that, as such, disappeared around the year 1283.

The church was built in the first half of the 10th century (between 931 and 937) in the reign of Ramiro II. This same monarch endowed the Church with donations, such as the Cross of Peñalba (donated in 940) and which today is a symbol of the Bierzo region. Throughout its history, despite its many relics, the monastic complex will be subject to financial difficulties, which will have to be settled with donations.

After the disappearance of the monastery, Santiago de Peñalba maintains its cult as a parish church sheltered by the town of Peñalba de Santiago, which will be built around it. In an isolated environment and with a population dedicated entirely to livestock and crops, the temple remained practically untouched, without reforms or subsequent additions that altered its original state. It would not be until the arrival in Peñalba of historians such as Manuel Gómez-Moreno (1909), when the historical value of Peñalba would become known.

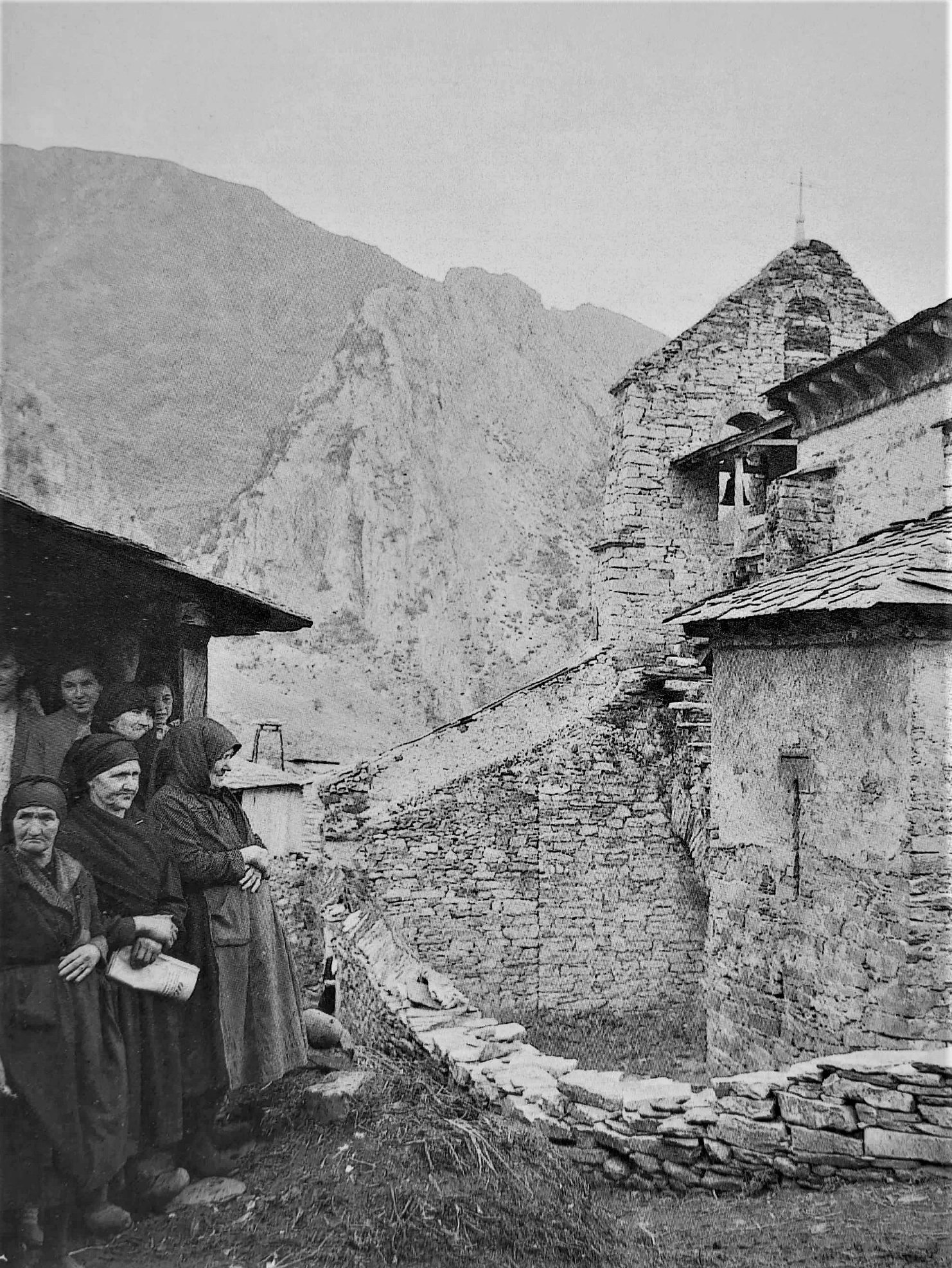
Santiago de Peñalba in 1951

== Architecture ==
Santiago de Peñalba, constructed with slate and limestone masonry, exhibits an exterior reminiscent of Visigothic churches with a cruciform design. However, its true structure differs significantly, comprising six prismatic elements—four along the main axis and two smaller chapels forming a cross without generating a transept. The slate roofs feature pronounced eaves supported by corbels adorned with geometric motifs and rosettes, characteristic of Mozarabic churches. Notably, the bell gable is positioned separately at the base of the cross-shaped plan on the western face. The main entrance, located on the southern side, unveils a remarkable portal with two pronounced horseshoe arches, upheld by marble columns and adorned with degenerate Corinthian capitals. This decorative element serves no structural purpose, framed by a large horseshoe arch that acts as a relieving arch, creating a small portico.

Internally, the church stands out as having opposing apses, a rarity for its time and circumstances. The presence of the counterapse is linked to North African influences. This second apse, oriented to the setting sun, adheres to an ancient sacred architectural tradition and served a funerary purpose, housing the burial site of San Genadio. The head of the church features a square exterior apse and a horseshoe-shaped interior, with a gallon vault considered a significant technical advancement. The nave and lateral compartments are covered by barrel vaults.

The presbytery, taller than the rest, has access through a horseshoe arch and is covered by an eight-celled gallon vault. The structure is designed to emphasize a lantern, with walls supported by vaults and an innovative technique allowing for large openings and horseshoe arches. The church showcases rich interior decoration, including recently discovered high medieval paintings from the Caliphal period, depicting vegetal and geometric motifs, as well as brick simulations.

Its uniqueness is evident in the fusion of decorative elements, where lunar and astral symbols evoke Celtic heritage, while the Latin cross plan proclaims its Christian devotion. The presence of Arabic features, such as the gallon dome in the lantern of the transept, along with distinctive Mozarabic horseshoe arches, bestows upon this architectural gem a singular complexity.

== Interior ==
=== Mural paintings ===
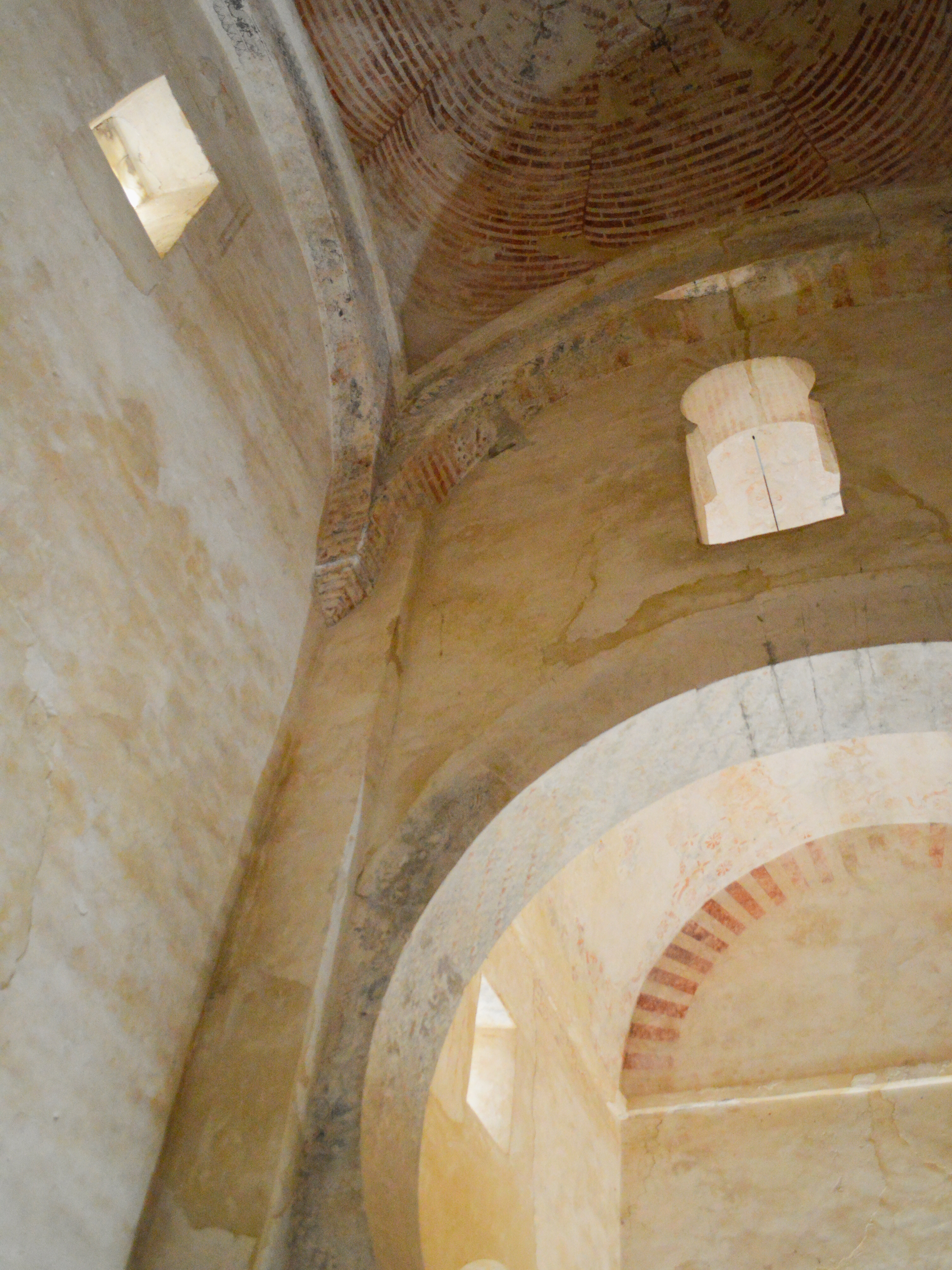
Caliphate-style mural paintings

Inside, the church is covered with mural paintings dating from the Caliphate period. The painting originally covered the entire building, although it is now preserved especially in the arches of the chevron dome of the central nave and in the two apses. The paintings have three different moments, the most primitive being contemporary to the church, from the 10th century, and were executed with the technique of fresco painting on a sand and lime mortar: on the wall that was still wet, he moved - using the punch, the rule and the compass - the compositional scheme, and later the pigments were applied.

Among the pictorial motifs, the simulated brick stands out, in addition to other paintings with plant and geometric motifs. The almagra socket (red paint made from clay-type iron oxide) is strikingly similar to that found in Medina Azahara in Córdoba. It is a decoration executed with an excellent technique and using high quality pigments. They have been partially restored in 2004, a process that continues today.

=== Medieval graffiti ===
Inside the church, especially on the walls of the choir, there is an extensive collection of medieval graffiti: different stucco engravings of human, geometric and even animal figures. It is a complex and diverse collection, understood as a spontaneous reflection of the life of the different inhabitants of the temple. Some graphites would correspond to tests carried out by the monks before transcribing these drawings on paper, since paper was a very precious commodity. In other cases, the works are attributed to drawings made by monks for entertainment or even as a reaffirmation of personal identity.

In the set stand out the figures of two lions, a hunting scene, the figure of a monk dressed in horse riding spurs in a blessing position, or several epigraphic graffiti that repeat the name of GĒNADII, in reference to San Genadio.

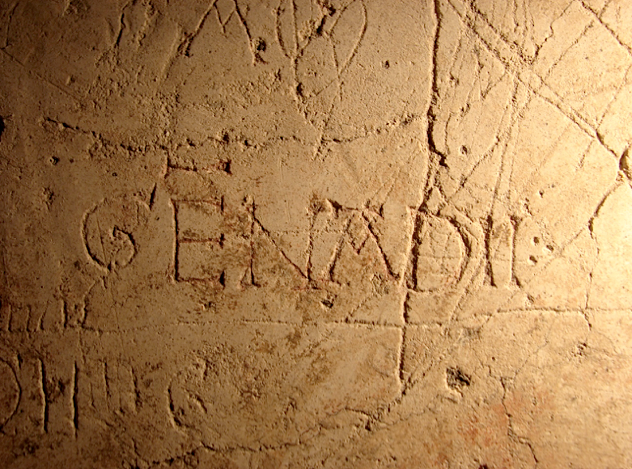
Graffiti referring to San Genadio

== Relics ==
=== Cross of Peñalba ===
The Cross of Peñalba is a votive cross given in the 10th century by the Leonese king Ramiro II of León to San Genadio in gratitude for the help received from the Apostle Santiago in the battle of Simancas (year 939) against Abderramán III. It is currently one of the main identity symbols of El Bierzo and is exhibited in the León Museum.

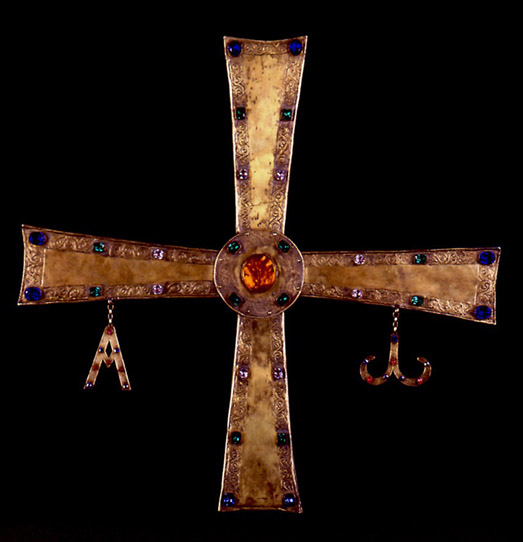
Cross of Peñalba, symbol of the Bierzo region

=== Chalice and paten from Santiago de Peñalba ===
Like the Cross, the Chalice and Paten of Santiago de Peñalba come from the disappeared monastery of Peñalba. They were ordered to be made by Abbot Pelayo in the middle of the 12th century, a moment in which it enjoyed great splendor. They are currently part of the permanent exhibition of the Louvre Museum in Paris.

=== San Genadio Chess ===
Bolos de San Genadio are four chess pieces from the 9th century originating in Santiago de Peñalba. They are considered to be the oldest in Europe, surely brought by Mozarabic hermits, who took them from Al-Ándalus to the Kingdom of León. A total of four pieces carved in goat's horn are preserved: two towers, one of them broken into two pieces, a knight and a bishop.

== Gallery ==
Santiago de Peñalba

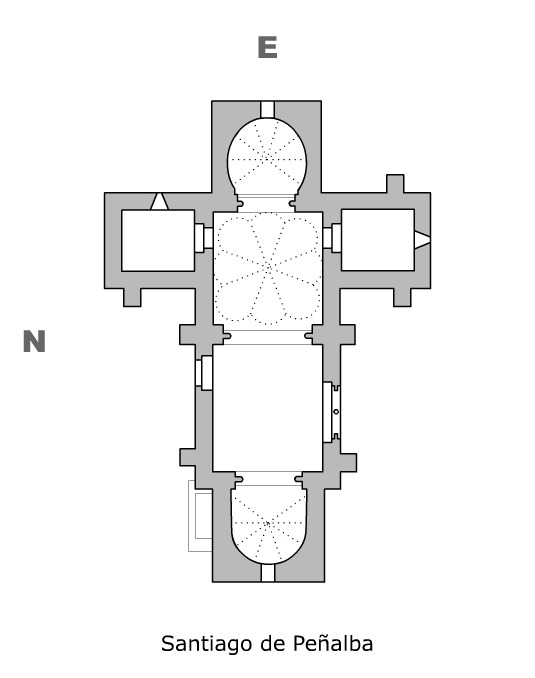
Plan

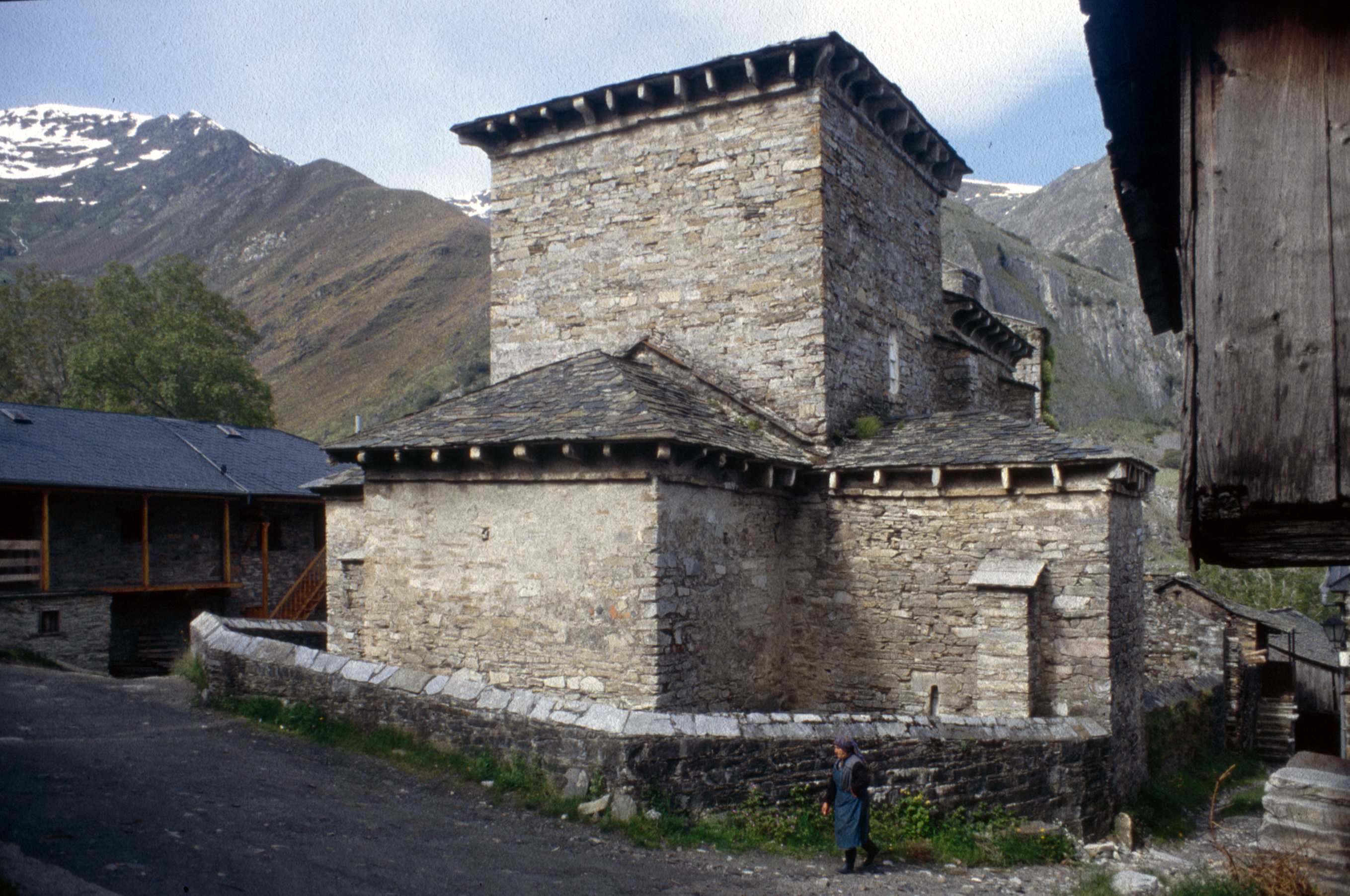
Santiago de Peñalba

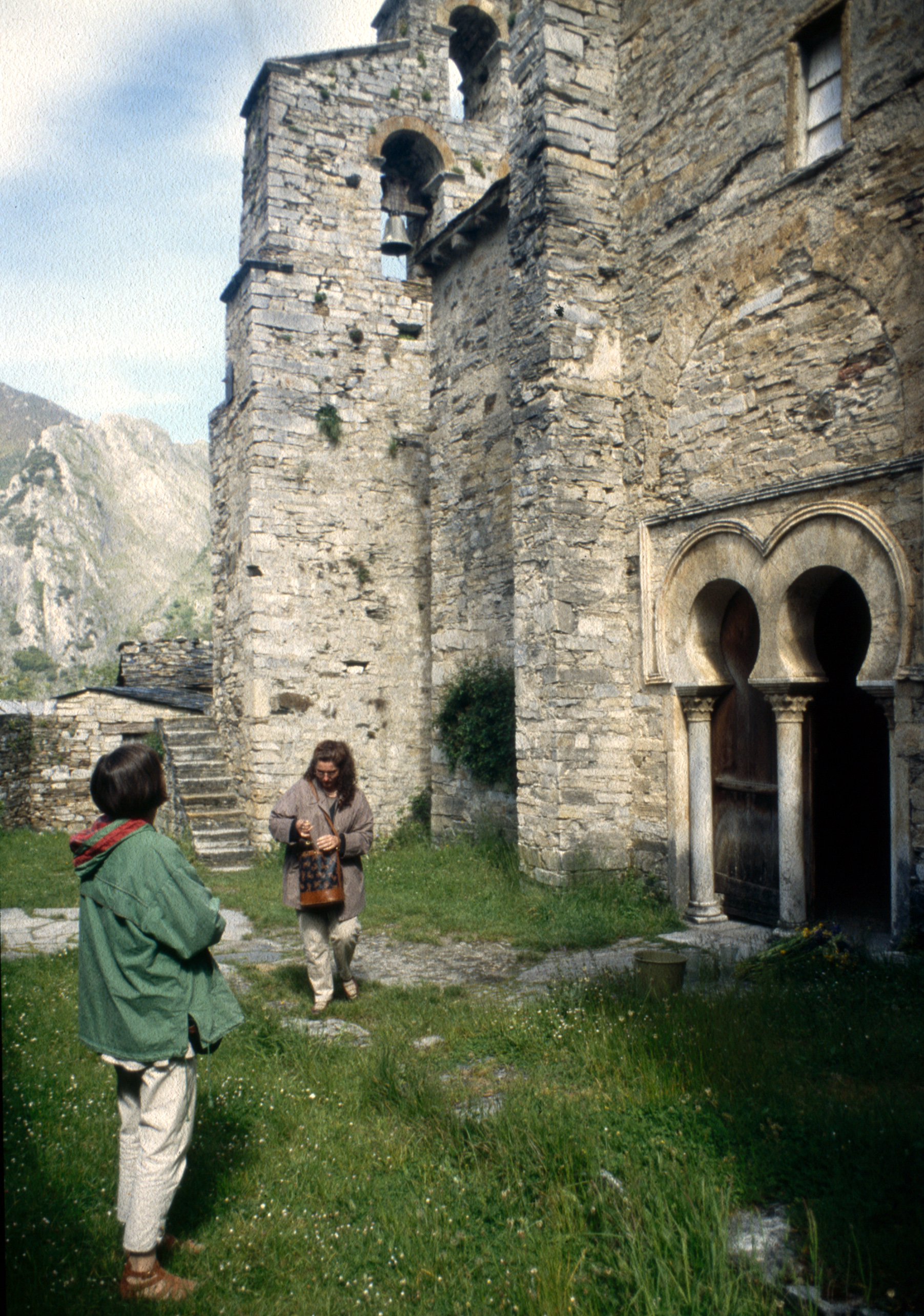
Mozarabic portal

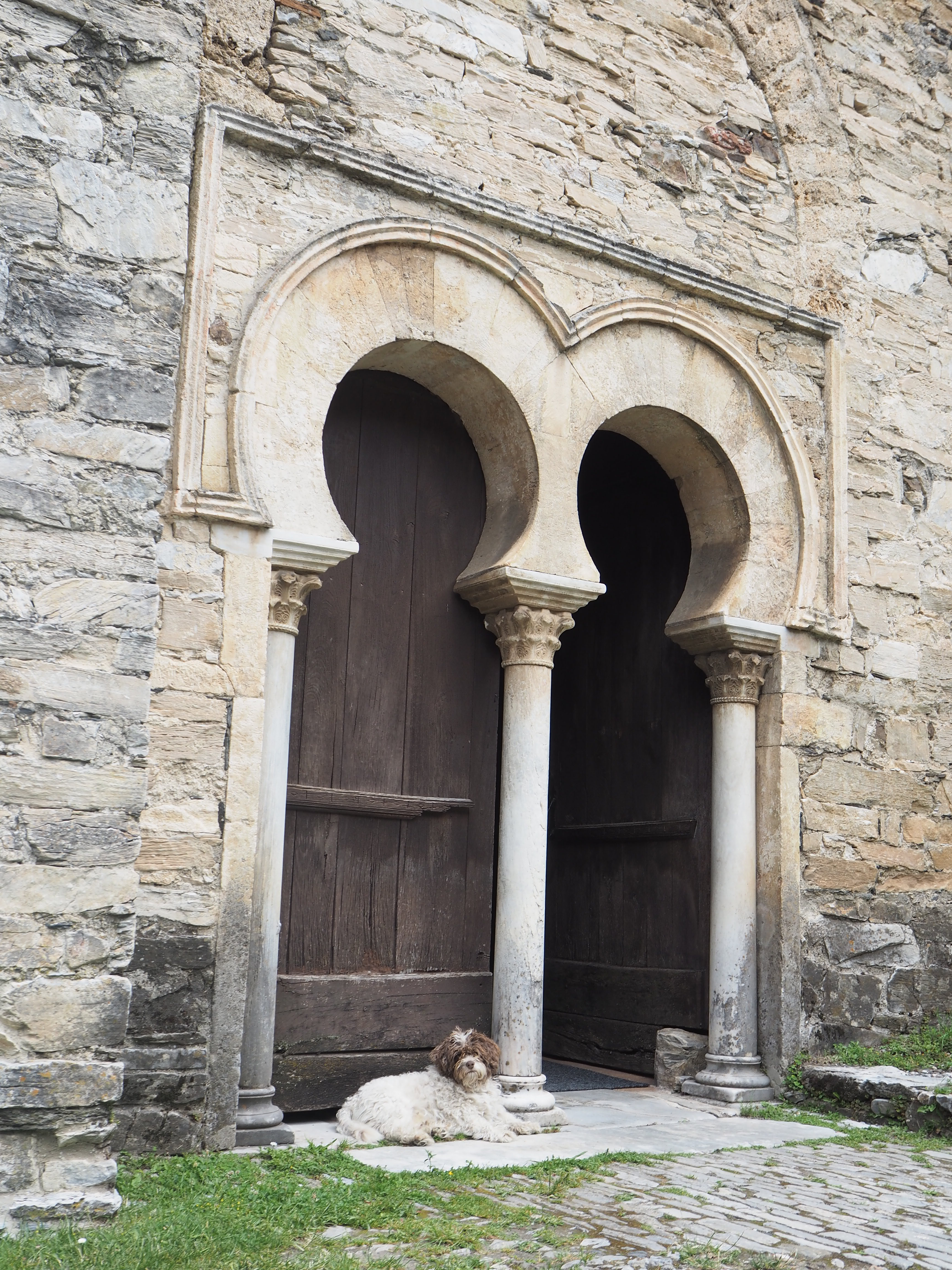
Mozarabic portal

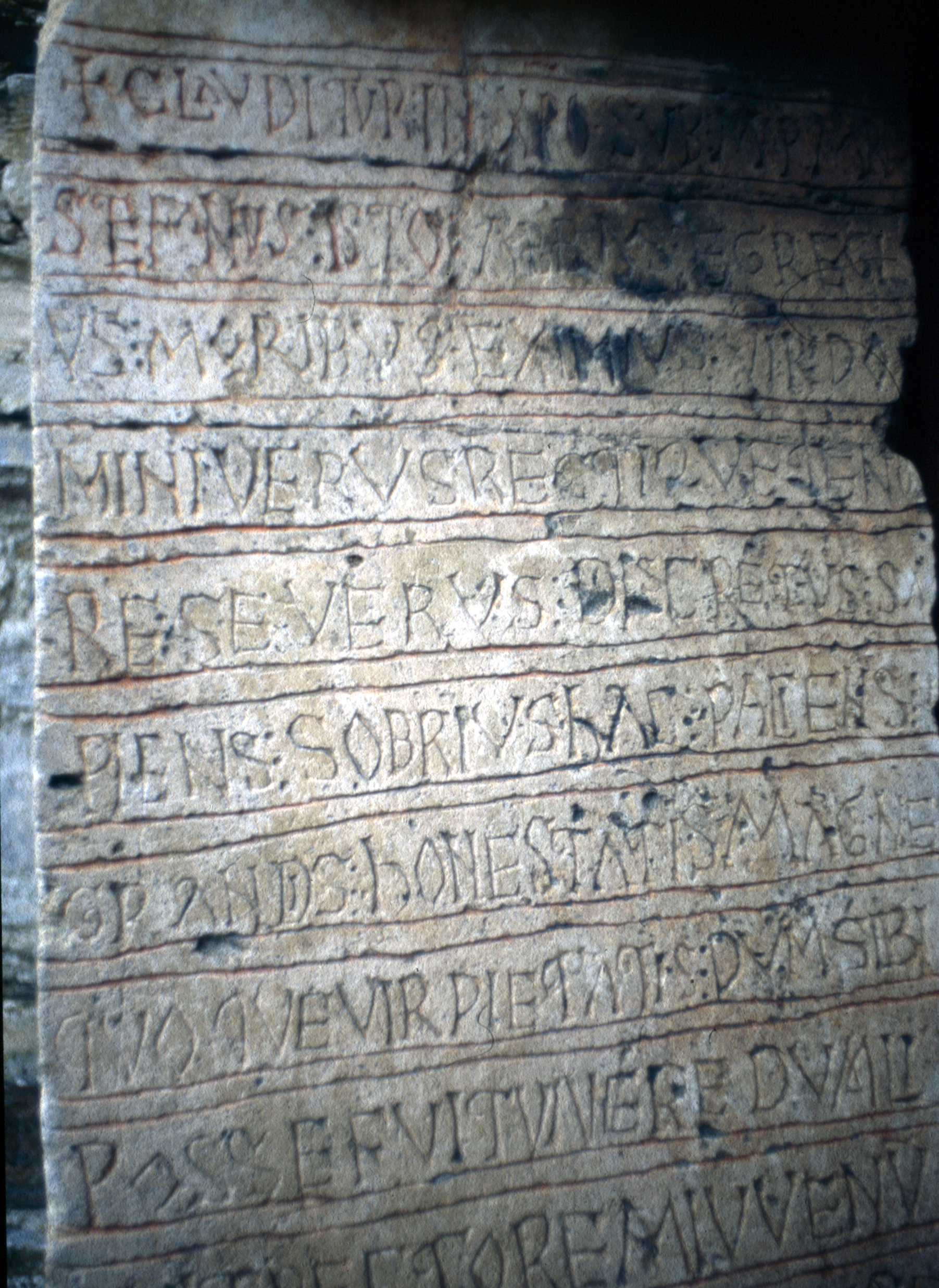
Inscription

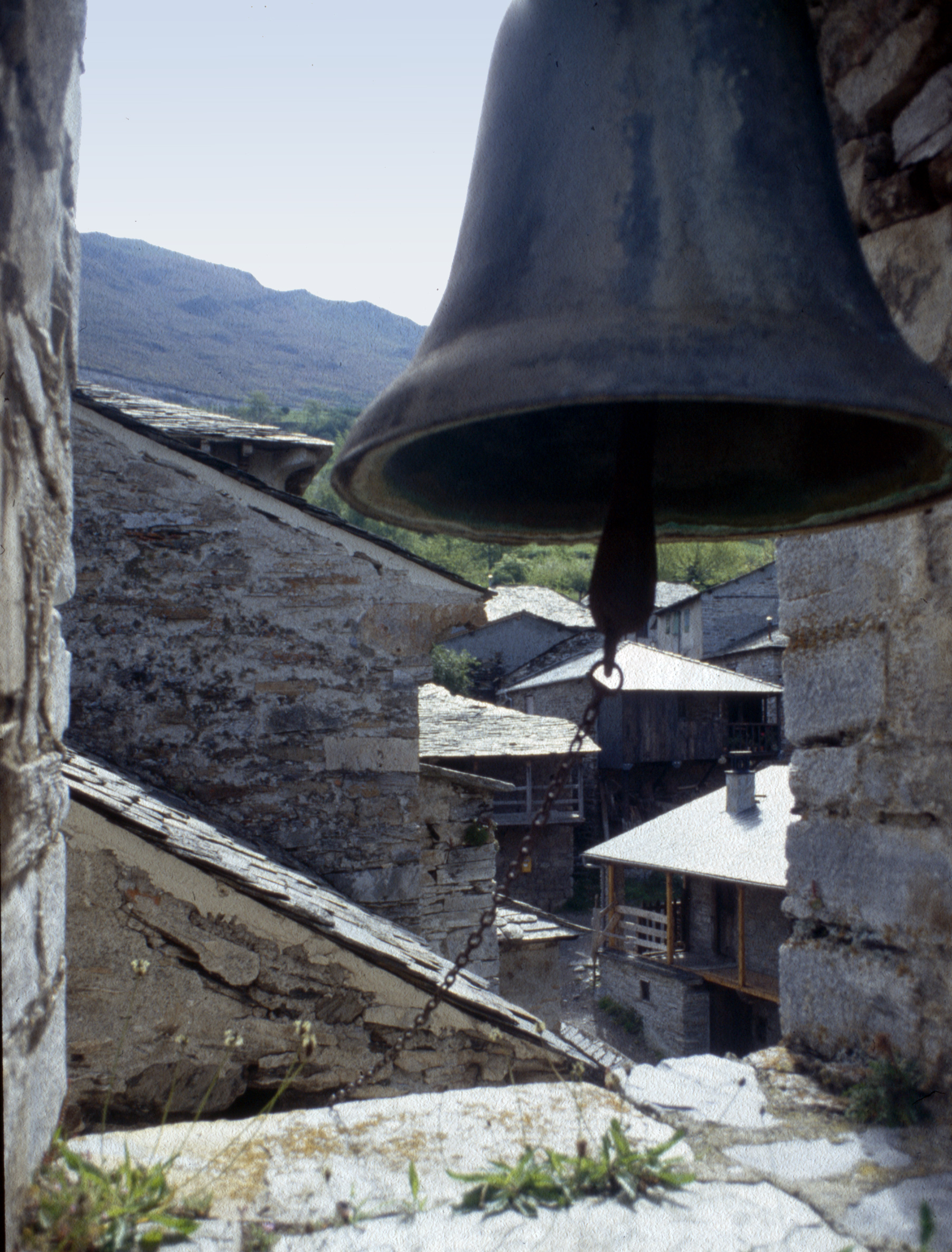
Bell

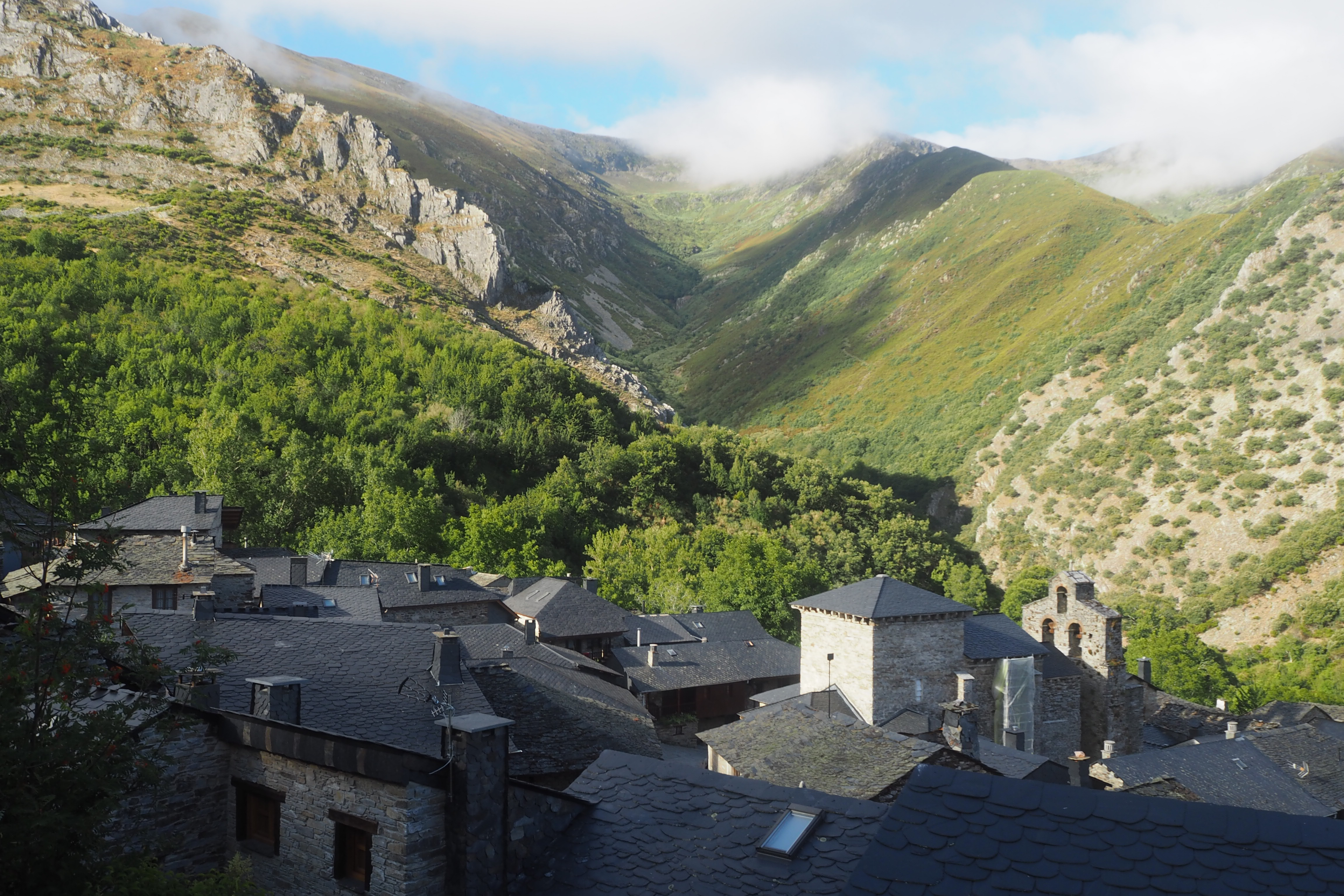
View of Peñalba de Santiago

== See also ==
- Early medieval domes
