= Genadio of Astorga =

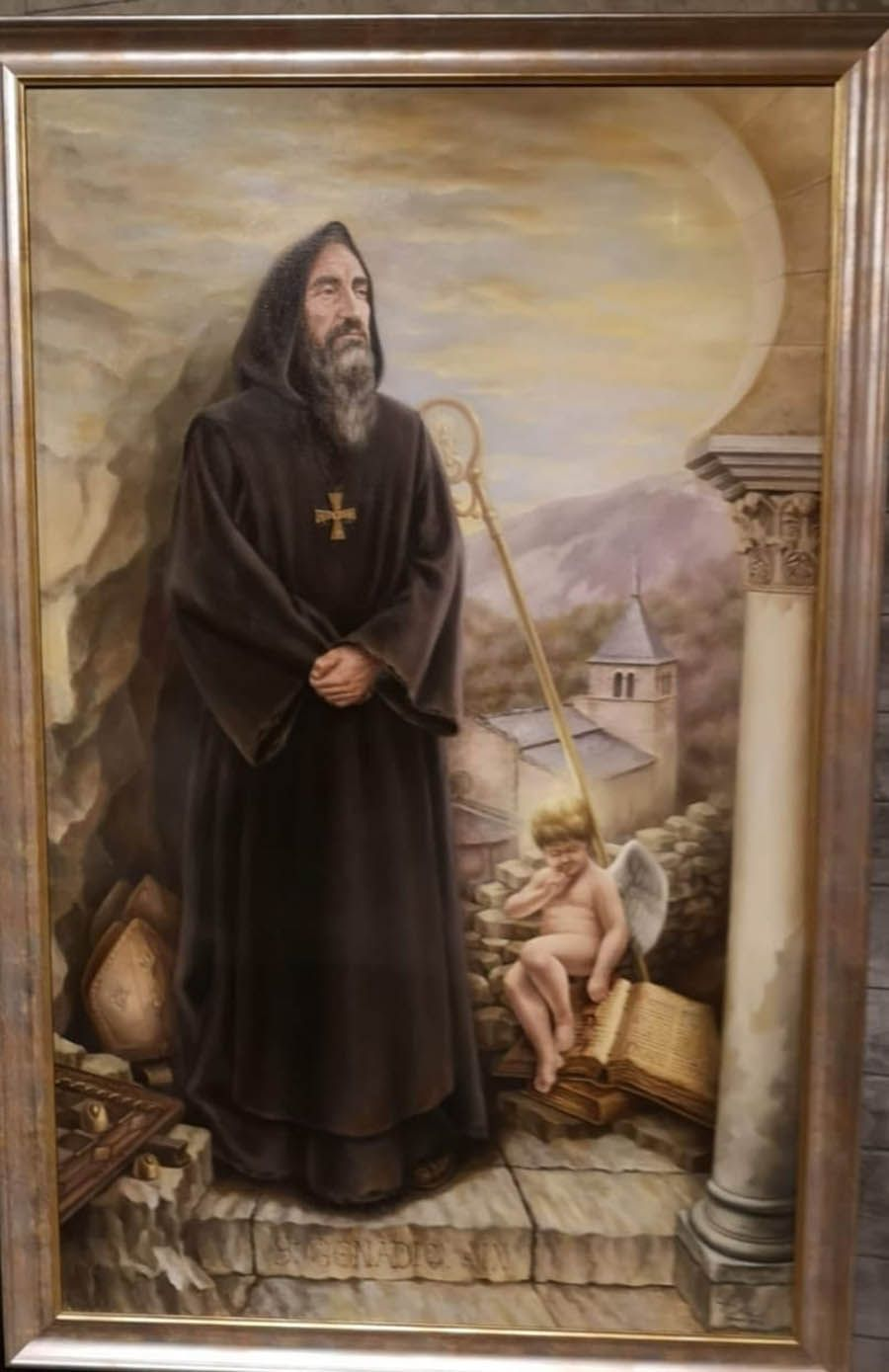
- Diocese: Diocese of Astorga
- Installed: 899
- Term ended: 920

Orders
- Ordination: Benedictine

Personal details
- Born: Genadio de Astorga c. 865; El Bierzo, province of León
- Died: c. 936 (71 years old); Peñalba de Santiago, Ponferrada
- Occupation: Monk, hermit and bishop

Sainthood
- Feast day: 25 May

Genadio of Astorga or popularly San Genadio (c. 865, possibly El Bierzo, León - 936, Peñalba de Santiago) was a Spanish Benedictine monk, hermit and bishop of Astorga between 899 and 920. He also founded several monasteries in El Bierzo. He made the Caves of San Genadio and retired there with other priests in periods of penance.

San Genadio played a crucial role in Mozarabic art, spearheading the restoration of San Pedro de Montes while establishing significant structures like Santiago de Peñalba. His posthumous canonization as a saint was swift, with pilgrimages to the caves where he lived attracting devout Catholics seeking soil believed to cure diseases. Despite being celebrated on May 25th until 1969, liturgical reforms led to his removal from the saints' calendar due to lack of official canonization.

Additionally, San Genadio is recognized as the first saint associated with chess. The revered ivory chess pieces, known as Piezas or Bolos de San Genadio, originated from Peñalba de Santiago, serving as Europe's oldest chess figures and having belonged to the saint.
