= Guy de Saint-Gelais =

16th Century French soldier and governor

- seigneur de Lanssac
- Coat of Arms of the Lusignan Saint-Gelais family
- Born: 3 December 1544
- Died: August 1622 (aged 77)
- Noble family: Saint-Gelais
- Spouse: Antoinette Raffin (m. 1571, separated 1585)
- Issue Detail: Artus de Saint-Gelais; Alexandre de Saint-Gelais; Jeanne de Saint-Gelais
- Father: Louis de Saint-Gelais
- Mother: Jeanne de La Roche-Andry

Guy de Saint-Gelais, seigneur de Lanssac (3 December 1544 – August 1622) was a French courtier, soldier, governor and rebel during the French Wars of Religion. The son of Louis de Saint-Gelais and Jeanne de La Roche-Andry, Lanssac inherited a strong position at the French court due to the great favour of his father. In the mid-1560s he undertook several diplomatic missions to the Holy Roman Empire, participated in the early civil wars in France fighting for the royalists, and undertook an expedition to Malta. In 1570 he was established as governor of Blaye, an important fortress town on the Gironde. With various other grandees he helped organise a naval armada in 1572, though it would ultimately be co-opted by the crown. In 1572 he entered the entourage of the king's brother the duc d'Anjou, and the following year he would participate in the successful effort to see Anjou elected as king of the Polish-Lithuanian Commonwealth.

In 1574, king Charles IX died, and Anjou returned to France to succeed him as Henry III. Lanssac was disappointed not to receive the reward he envisioned for helping in Anjou's election. In 1575, Lanssac became vice-amiral de Guyenne . During the sixth French War of Religion in 1577 he participated in the successful siege of the strategically valuable fortress town of Brouage and was rewarded with the governorship of the place. He then involved himself in several abortive naval plans, first one against Spanish colonial possessions, and then another against Cyprus. At the end of 1578 he was pressured to sell the governorship of Brouage. In 1579 he involved himself in a treasonous plot with the Spanish king Philip II to conquer the Moroccan city of Al Araish, though this was quickly uncovered. He was pressured to divest himself of his governorship of Blaye. During the Portuguese succession crisis of 1580 he involved himself in the planned French expedition to the Azores in favour of the prior do Crato. However, he became frustrated with the expeditions leader, Strozzi and would not participate in the expedition. His relations with king Henry reached a breaking point after he tried to launch a coup against Saint-Jean-d'Angély. He turned to the king's brother, Alençon, with an ambitious proposal to conquer Spanish colonial-possessions, however this was rejected. With the death of Alençon, the heir to the throne was the Protestant king of Navarre. Lanssac joined with the Catholic ligue (league) that rejected this succession. He helped facilitate the coordination of the ligue with the Spanish crown, and fought alongside the ligue against the French crown in 1585, though his military efforts were largely foiled. After peace was re-established between Henry and the ligue, Lanssac continued to engage in naval piracy against English shipping, much to the king's frustration.

After the king assassinated the leader of the ligue, the duc de Guise in 1588, Lanssac and the other ligueurs (leaguers) entered war with the crown. Lanssac operated first in Maine in 1589, though he was arrested by a fellow commander. Escaping this he moved to Brittany where he helped the Spanish conquer the port of Le Blavet on the mouth of the river Blavet. He then travelled to Spain where he made elaborate proposals for the conquest of France to the Spanish king. These were rebuffed by Philip, and Lanssac returned to France to work with his half-brother the bishop of Comminges in organising the southern Campanère Ligue on the Spanish border. He and his brother remained loyal to the ligue as the war against the crown slowly turned in the favour of the king of Navarre who, now Henry III had died styled himself Henry IV. In 1594 he and his brother made their capitulation to the crown and begged for mercy. Lanssac's defection came too late for him to enjoy royal favour from Henry. Around 1597 he made an elaborate proposal for Henry to invade Spain that was rebuffed. For much of his career he had been plagued by his debts, and by now his wife had separated from him. He spent the last decades of his life without significant office, and wracked by debt. In 1603 he stormed his wife's château in frustration at her separation from him. Throughout his final years he maintained his contacts with the Spanish crown, and continued to ask for money from the Spanish ambassador. He died in obscurity in 1622.

== Early life and family ==
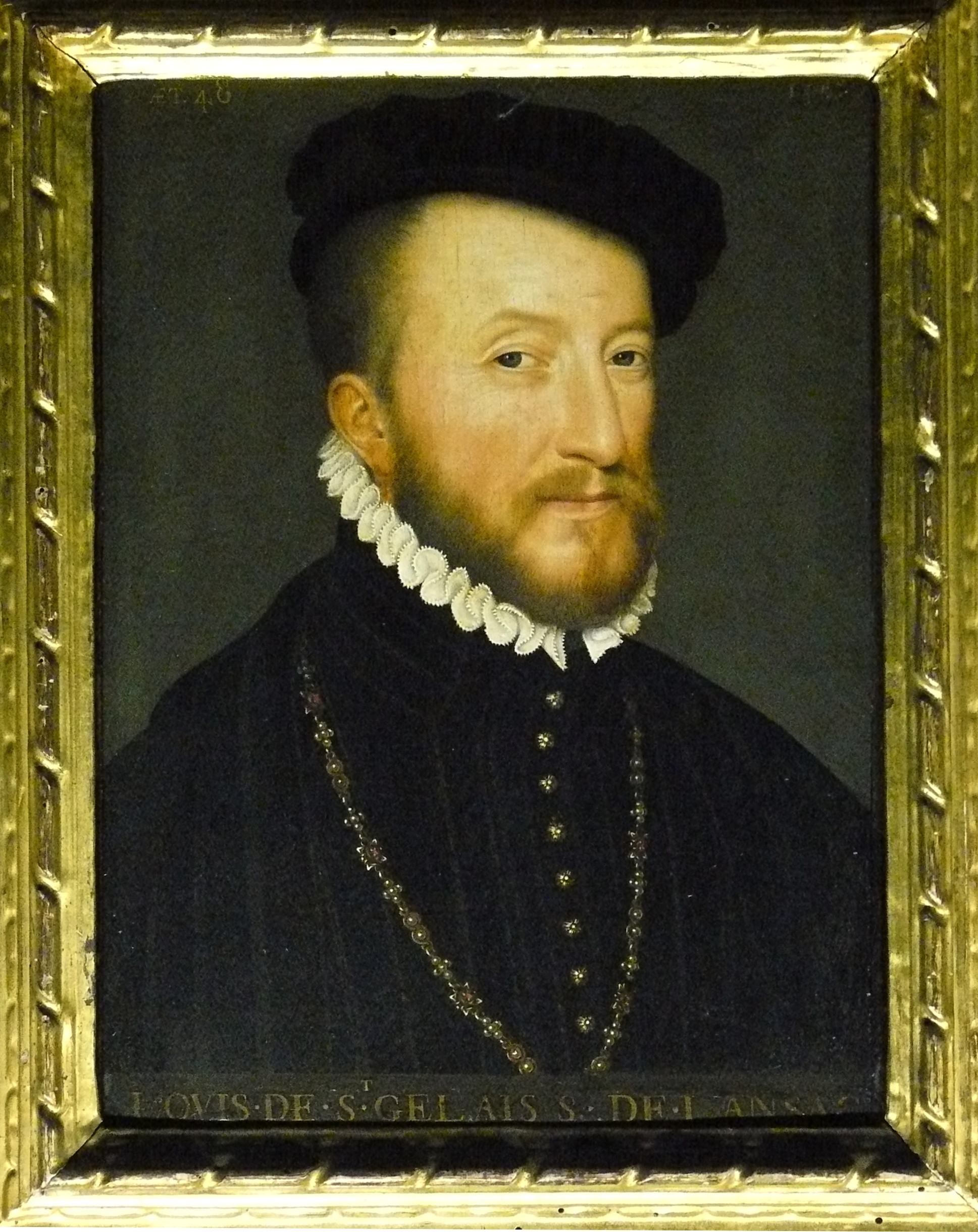
Louis de Saint-Gelais, seigneur de Lanssac, and father of Guy

Guy de Saint-Gelais was born on 3 December 1544, the eldest son of Louis de Saint-Gelais and his wife Jeanne de La Roche-Andry. His father Louis devoted his life to royal service, in particular that of the queen mother Catherine to whom he served as her chevalier d'honneur (knight of honour) from 1573. Louis served as an ambassador of the French crown to the Papacy, the Council of Trento and Spain. He would die at the age of 76. Guy's mother, Jeanne would die in 1563. Guy would prove unable to maintain the circumstances his father had been able to occupy.

The Saint-Gelais family that had traditionally served the kings of Navarre before entering the service of the French crown in the sixteenth century. The seigneurie (lordship) de Lanssac itself was located near the stronghold of Bourg-sur-Gironde, which boasted a strategic position at the confluence of the Garonne and Dordogne, and was upstream of Blaye. Bourg was a place the family were used to the exercise of the government of.

=== Lands and residences ===
In October 1565, Guy's father remarried to Gabrielle de Rochechouart. At this time he provided to Guy his seigneuries in the Angoumois, Poitou and Guyenne. In particular La Roche-Andry in the Angoumois, the seigneuries of Ambérac, Venoux, Ardilleux and Basses-Vergnes in Poitou, and those of Lanssac (now spelled Lansac) and Saint-Savin in Guyenne. The value of all these lands was 135,000 livres (pounds), however Louis would maintain the usufruct of the lands. Thus, from 1565, on paper at least, Guy was the seigneur de Lanssac and it will be by this name that he is referred to throughout the rest of this article. Despite possessing all these seigneuries, Lanssac did not enjoy use of either the land or the incomes.

When staying in Paris around 1570, he would not take advantage of his father's residence on the rue Saint-Honoré (as Louis had bequeathed it to his younger brother Charles) but rather rented from a bourgeois of the city on the rue Saint-André-des-Arts.

=== Marriage ===
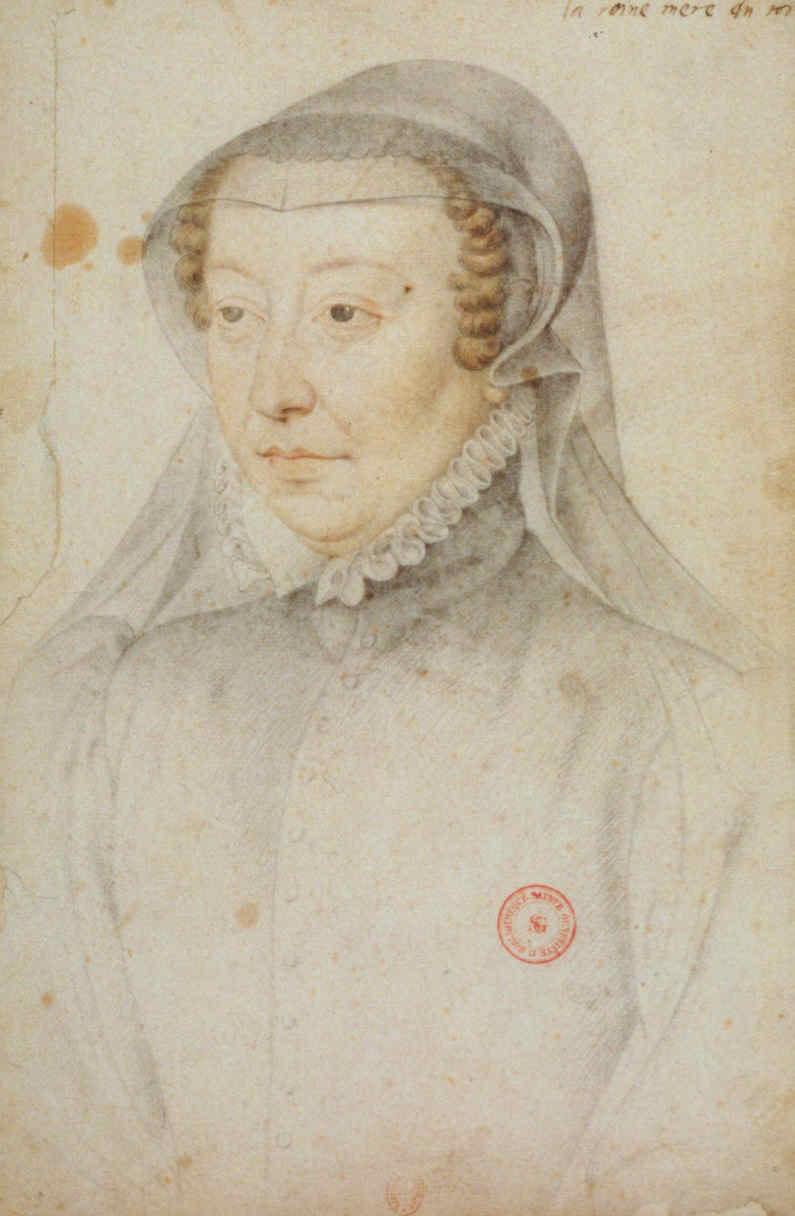
Catherine, mother of Charles IX and Henry III. She would serve as the patron to Lanssac at the start of his career, and for the last few decades of his father's career

With the blessing of the queen mother Catherine and the king Charles IX, Guy's father Louis attempted to arrange a marriage for him with mlle de Morvillier in 1570, the niece of the garde des sceaux (de facto chancellor) Jean de Morvillier the bishop of Orléans. This marital plan did not bear fruit. Nevertheless, on 4 August 1571 Guy secured an advantageous marriage when he was wedded to the very wealthy Antoinette Raffin, the daughter of François Raffin the sénéchal d'Agen (seneschal of Agen) and Nicole Le Roy a descendant of the great Tourangeau house of Le Roy de Chavigny. For the occasion of the marriage, Lanssac's father gave him an annuity of 3,000 livres and provided him the château de Lanssac and half the seigneurie de La Roche-Andry. From his wife, Lanssac acquired the seigneurie de Puycalvary in the Agenais, and Azay-le-Rideau in Touraine, and he would spend much time in the former. Through Antoinette's mother, Nicole, Lanssac would be able to ally himself with the house of Cossé. This was due to Nicole's remarriage to the maréchal de Cossé.

Nevertheless, the marriage presented an expensive bill to Lanssac. He owed 6,400 livres to a cloth merchant and had to borrow a further 5,800 livres from a Parisian bourgeois for gold work to demonstrate his status.

Antoinette would serve as a dame d'honneur (lady-in-waiting) to the queen of Navarre (from 1589 queen of France) Marguerite. Along with Marguerite she made ecclesiastical donations.

The marriage did not proceed smoothly. She established herself in the family château d'Azay-le-Rideau while her husband was living in the south west of the kingdom. In 1585 she opened proceedings for the separation of their goods in 1585 in the hopes of preserving her lands from the crushing debts that consumed Lanssac. From this point forward the couple were separated. In 1596 she succeeded in securing the separation of her patrimony from her husband, though she was obliged to pay 2,400 livres in alimony to him. Lanssac immediately devoted the sum to his creditors. When her mother Nicole died in 1601 she inherited the estates. Humiliated by his wife's request for separation from him, on 15 October 1603 Lanssac stormed his wife's château d'Azay-le-Rideau and pillaged the jewels, wine, rye, flour and nuts from the residence. He occupied her château until 25 January 1604. He was obliged by the courts to return the jewels he had stolen.

Despite seeking and gaining separation, the fortune of Antoinette was destroyed by her husbands bankruptcy. Both Queen Marie and her son King Louis XIII would involve themselves in the families affairs to protect the patrimony of Guy and Antoinette. Indeed, in 1618 with royal blessing, Artus de Saint-Gelais was able to buy back control of the family lands of Ambès and Saint-Savin (alongside the family governorship of Bourg.

=== Children ===
With Antoinette Raffin, Guy had the following issue:

- Artus de Saint-Gelais, married in 1614 Françoise de Souvré with issue.
- Alexandre de Saint-Gelais, died before 1615.
- Jeanne de Saint-Gelais.

It is likely the maréchal de Cossé served as a godfather to Lanssac's eldest son. This would explain the name 'Artus' which they both share. The very advantageous marriage secured for Artus was a testament to the good favour Guy's wife enjoyed at court.

=== Cultural pursuits ===
Lanssac had a talent for producing verse, singing and playing the lute. Isaac Habert (poète) (poet) praised his talents in a collection of poetry he dedicated to Lanssac. He also received a sonnet dedicated to him from the famed Pierre Ronsard. On shrove Tuesday in February 1580 Lanssac acted as a stage director for a masquerade held at the queen mother's residence. The masquerade featured two troupes of dancers, one Portuguese the other Spanish. Young blindfolded boys represented cupid. A complex series of interactions between the Iberian dancers concluded in a group dance between the two. He received praise from the king for the production. The political implications of the production were obvious at a time when Portugal was threatened with conquest by Spain: the two nations should be united by love as opposed to force of arms. By this means he was supporting the queen mothers plans as regarded the Portuguese succession.

In addition to his skills in the arts, Lanssac was fluent in Castilian.

=== First years ===
During his early years, Lanssac matriculated at the collège de Guyenne (college of Guyenne) in Bordeaux.

== Reign of Charles IX ==
=== Young diplomat ===
In the first chapter of his career, Lanssac would be a man of the queen mother Catherine, like his father. He was blessed with having inherited his father's silver tongue. He conducted his first extraordinary diplomatic mission at the age of eighteen.

In 1563, at the age of nineteen, he presented himself at the French court. No sooner had he arrived than he was established as a gentilhomme de la chambre du roi (gentleman of the king's chamber) which brought with it an income of 520 livres. He acquired a pension of 600 livres which would then be doubled to 1,200 livres by the queen mother Catherine in 1567.

Lanssac accompanied the French court on their grand tour of the kingdom which began in 1564. By the means of this great tour, Catherine hoped to re-establish the bonds between the king and his subjects. It was also hoped that it would aid in the application of justice thereby strengthening the authority of the state, particularly as regarded Catholicism and Protestantism and the enforcement of the internal peace.

While the grand tour was still ongoing, the court rendezvoused in June 1565 with Catherine's daughter, Élisabeth (and the duke of Alba) at Bayonne. The Bayonne Interview was the occasion for many festivities. It was hoped the Spanish would be convinced of the resurgent power of the French crown after the civil war, however many Protestants interpreted the meeting as the origin of a conspiracy for their elimination. Related to this Lanssac undertook an extraordinary diplomatic mission into the Holy Roman Empire. He was charged with reassuring the markgraf von Brandenburg (marquis of Brandenburg) as to what the nature of the discussions between the French and Spanish had been at the recent Bayonne meeting.

=== Taking arms ===
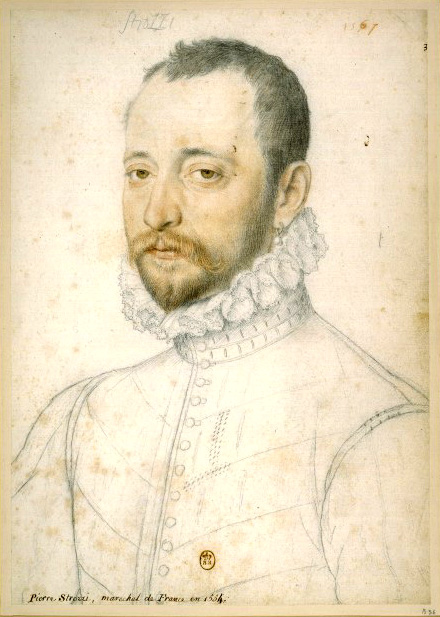
Strozzi, cousin of the queen mother Catherine and collaborator with Lanssac on many naval exploits until the two men fell out with one another in 1581

In that year he was also among the nobles who responded to news of the Ottoman Empire's siege of Malta by travelling to the island to aid in the defence. Along with him would be the future comte de Brissac (count of Brissac), his relative the seigneur de Brantôme, the Florentine Strozzi and three hundred other gentilshommes (gentleman) under Strozzi's command. By the time of the parties arrival the Ottoman siege had already been lifted and thus the group devoted themselves to maritime privateering instead (Lanssac's first experience of naval warfare). Lanssac then travelled to Magyar Királyság (the kingdom of Hungary) where the main action against the Ottoman's was being fought. On this front the young duc de Guise (duke of Guise) was fighting with a small band.

From 1567 to 1571 Lanssac served as the maire (mayor) of Bordeaux, something his father had done before him in 1556. His first election was on 1 August 1567, he was subsequently re-elected in August 1569.

With the resumption of the civil wars in France in 1567 came a new opportunity to engage in royal service. The crown dispatched Lanssac to the Holy Roman Empire again so that he might entreat the Protestant prince the count palatine of Simmern against intervention in France in favour of the Protestant cause. He was unsuccessful in this endeavour, and the German prince would invade the kingdom in favour of the Protestants.

Having returned from his diplomatic mission to France, he was subsequently captured by the Protestant rebels. The king's brother the duc d'Anjou had to intervene in his favour with the Protestant prince de Condé to secure his release as illustrated in a letter of 23 December 1567.

Thanks to his father, Lanssac enjoyed receipt of property seized from rebels against the crown, as well as fines paid for crimes.

=== Advancement through execution ===
Places of relevance during Lanssac's career, orange highlights denote towns he held the government of

The peace that had brought the second civil war to a close was very fragile, the Catholics were convinced it had interrupted their military victory. Catherine for her part, perhaps imagining a new Protestant offensive, looked to prevent a new sedition. Nervous, the Protestant leadership withdrew into Burgundy. From here they were pursued to La Rochelle by the seigneur de Tavannes, arriving in the city on 19 September. On 28 September 1568 a new edict outlawing Protestantism was registered. In these circumstances, civil war quickly followed. Lanssac fought at the battle of Jarnac where he was wounded. However, he gained a simultaneous boon due to the death of the commander of a compagnie d'ordonnance (ordinance company). The compagnies previous commander, the baron de Prunay, had been captured at the battle of Jarnac and subsequently executed. This compagnie, which was raised from the north of France was supplemented with men from Lanssac's regions of origin, namely Bordeaux and Saintonge.

On 6 August 1570 he was established as the captain and governor of Blaye. He was also the governor of Bourg-sur-Gironde. He came to control Blaye due to the death sentence that was imposed on its previous governor (des Roys) for having surrendered the settlement to the prince de Condé. Control of these settlements offered control of access to the provincial capital of Bordeaux. Lanssac could now tax English ships heading upstream to Bordeaux, and arm naval vessels.

Sometime around 1569–70, through the favour of his father and involvement of the queen mother Catherine Lanssac became the sénéchal d'Agen and received induction into the highest order of French chivalry when he was made chevalier de l'Ordre de Saint-Michel (knight of the order of Saint-Michel). During this period he alternated his time between Paris and the south-west of the kingdom.

Though the king's brother, the duc d'Anjou had initially been surrounded with men that were of his mother Catherine's clientele (the maréchal de Matignon (marshal of Matignon), the governor of Poitou the comte du Lude and the surintendant des finances (superintendent of the finances) Bellièvre) the young prince was beginning to form his own clientele by 1570. This involved men such as the seigneur de Saint-Sulpice, and Lanssac, both of whom were sons of men in Catherine's party.

Towards the start of 1572 an armada of ships was put together at Brouage by the cousin of the queen mother Catherine, Strozzi, with whom Lanssac had campaigned in 1565. It was composed of around 20 large warships, with 7,000 arquebusiers and siege guns. The target of this expedition was either the Spanish colony of Peru or the ships laden with treasure that were returning from Peru. The cover for the gathering of so many vessels was that they were to partake in an anti-piracy mission. He received buy in for this project from the cardinal de Bourbon, various captains and bourgeois and the southern seigneurs Lanssac and his father Louis. This expedition would not in the end fulfil its originally designated purpose, first interrupted by the St Bartholomew's Day Massacre before then being acquired by the king for the siege of La Rochelle which began at the end of the year.

Still in the service of the duc d'Anjou in 1572, he was established as a gentilhomme de la chambre du duc (gentleman of the duke's chamber) by Anjou in that year. In May 1572 he was promoted to chambellan for the duc. The compagnie d'ordonnance that he was in command of was dissolved in 1572. In return for the expenses he had incurred in the compagnies upkeep and to compensate him for the dissolution he was provided with 12,000 livres. He also sold the title of sénéchal d'Agen to the seigneur de Bajamont in 1572. The selling of this office was made for fiscal reasons, Bajamont would not however have paid him the entire sum even by 1576.

After the seismic St. Bartholomew's Day massacre, Lanssac (according to a contemporary Protestant historian) was one of the royal councillors (alongside the seigneur de Villeroy and bishop of Valence) who advised the king to put the blame for the executions on the Lorraine-Guise family.

Alongside his long time collaborator Strozzi, Lanssac would participate in the siege of La Rochelle in 1572–1573 in the company of the baron de La Garde.

=== Commonwealth ===
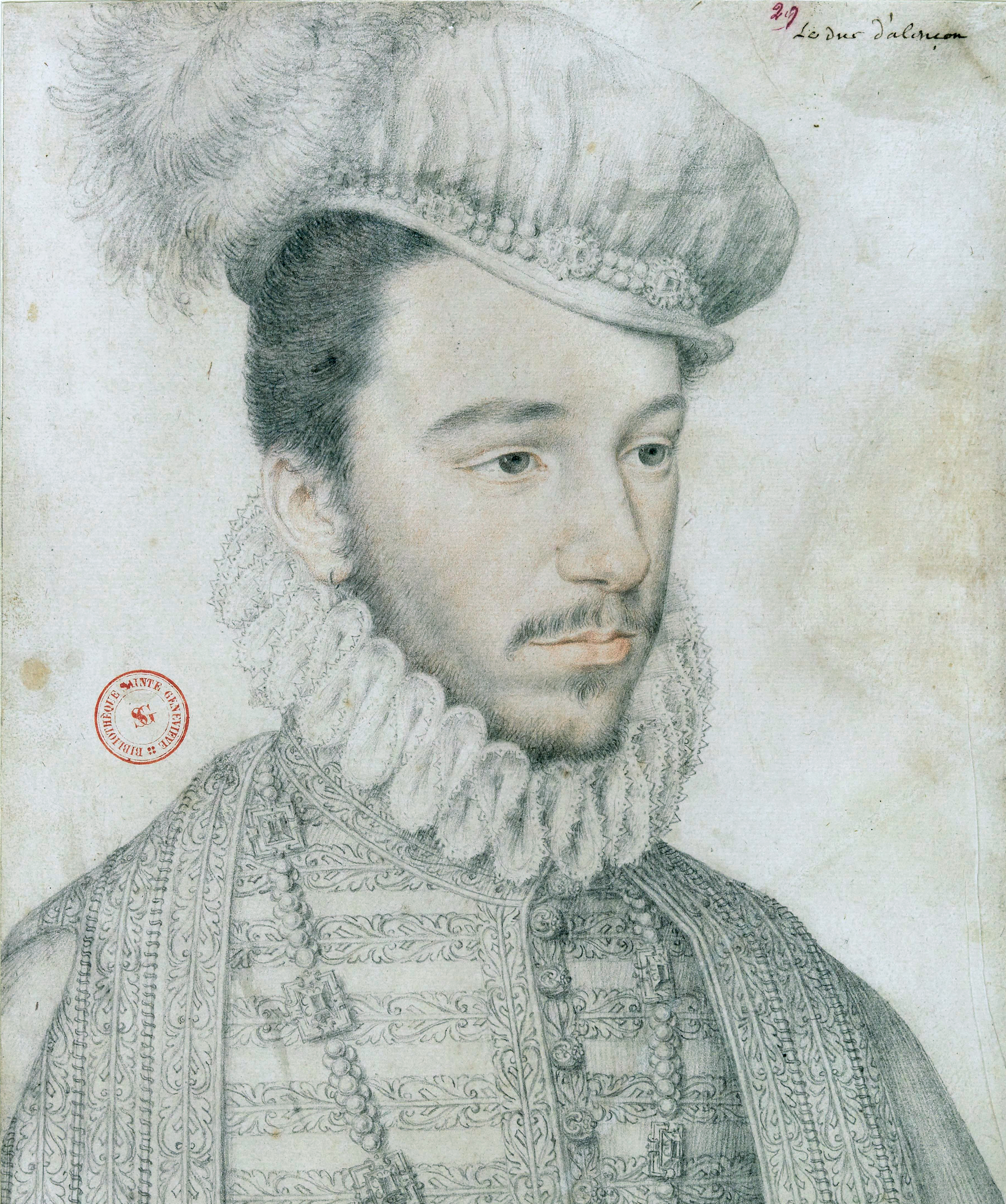
Duc d'Anjou, brother to the king and from 1574 king of France as Henry III

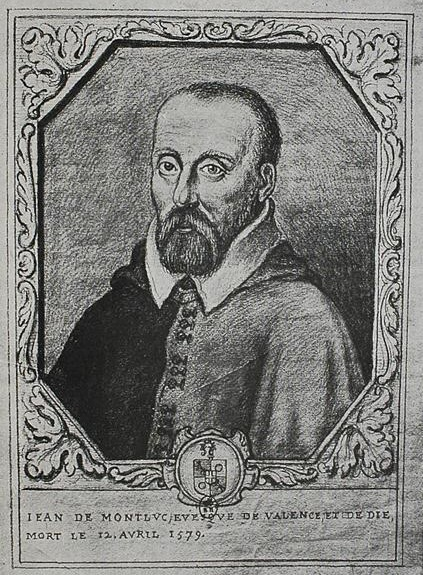
Bishop of Valence, leading diplomat in the effort to see Anjou elected as king of the Polish-Lithuanian Commonwealth

While the bishop of Valence was working to secure the election of the duc d'Anjou as the king of the Commonwealth, he complained of the difficult task he faced. The massacre of Saint-Bartholomew and the competition for the throne from other candidates complicated matters for Valence. He emphasised in particular that if the siege of La Rochelle was resolved in a violent destruction of the city his position would be significantly further complicated. He thus appealed to the French court.

In response two men arrived to offer their support. Firstly the abbot of L'Isle and secondly the seigneur de Lanssac who had departed France on 16 January. Lanssac arrived in the country on 1 March 1573, and was initially arrested as a spy, though subsequently released. Both Lanssac and the abbot travelled all across the Commonwealth, making an emotive case to all those they spoke to (in Latin, so that they might be understood) that Anjou was "easy of access, a good listener and a wise responder". After the bishop of Valence (and his competition) had delivered their speeches in which they made the cases for their candidates there was a several week period before the voting. During this time Valence continued to receive all visitors while the abbot of L'Isle worked to build up fervour with the Commonwealth's bishops and Lanssac was focused on inspiring the passions of the more politique electors. A third representative, the seigneur de Balagny did his best to entertain the electors with drinks, dances and other entertainment. The voting for the election transpired starting 4 May 1573, and by 9 May it was known that Anjou had won the vote of the noble electors and Monluc wrote back to inform the prince. Two days later the supporters of the other candidates - Archduke Ernest of Austria and the king of Sweden - conceded defeat to Anjou. The concession was not unconditional however, the party of the dissidents wished to impose upon Anjou the signing of articles that would limit his powers as king. When they came to present these articles they were quickly drowned out by cries acclaiming Anjou as king. The astute Zborowski, understanding the risk of this dissension triangulated between the two camps of electors. He declared that Anjou had been successfully elected, but not yet appointed as king. Success in this would be maintained behind the acceptance of the dissident parties conditions by the three French ambassadors.

Aware of what had transpired, Monluc and the other ambassadors hurried back to Warsaw. Monluc, L'Isle and Lanssac then swore the oath in Anjou's name to abide by the articles in question to the primate of Poland the archbishop of Gniezno.

Monluc wrote a praised filled letter back to Anjou, extolling the good fortune that Lanssac had been sent to assist him in the mission of seeing to the princes election. Lanssac subsequently made his way back to France via the Northern naval route. Upon reaching Denmark, he was arrested and several of his subordinates were executed, including two captains. Destitute, it was with the loan of money from the French ambassador in the country that he made his way back to France.

Anjou received word of the success of his election on 29 May 1573 and celebrated before the city of La Rochelle (that the royal army under his command had been besieging) on 17 June.

Back in France, Lanssac drew up a report for Anjou on the situation in the Commonwealth and how best to bring about an absolutist government in the country. He outlined which Polish nobles were the priority to win over, and how best to show his piety in the country. As regarded his expenses in the country, Lanssac's father forwarded him 800 écus (crown), however even the eventual 50,000 livres he received on 27 December 1573 in compensation for his time in the Commonwealth did not entirely cover his expenses.

On 2 December, the duc d'Anjou took his leave of Catherine. He arrived in his new kingdom on 19 January 1574.

In the conspiracies that dominated the final year of Charles IX's life, Lanssac remained aloof. He was devoted at this time to plans of a new naval expedition against the Spanish islands, arming a flotilla out of Rouen to this effect.

== Reign of Henry III ==
=== Insufficient reward ===
On 30 May 1574, Charles IX died. Catherine wrote to her next eldest son, Anjou encouraging him to return to France. Upon returning, Anjou assumed the throne as Henry III. Catherine had advised him at the time of his departure from the Commonwealth, not to show particular favour and graces to those who had gone with him for his brief reign abroad, however upon his return Henry set to work rewarding his loyal supporters. This would be at the expense of Lanssac's father Louis, who was decidedly a client of Catherine's. Despite this general effort to reward those who had served him, Lanssac did not receive recognition from Henry for his role in aiding the election of the prince as king of the Commonwealth in the year prior. In particular he did not receive the office of grand écuyer (grand squire) that his father had requested to be his reward. Lanssac was left embittered by this. Henry considered Lanssac a man too close to the queen mother. Though embittered Lanssac was not devoid of any royal compensation. Henry established him as a gentilhomme de la chambre du roi and allowed him to farm the proceeds of a couple of offices he could sell. By now his pension had risen to a value of 5,000 livres.

In October 1575, Lanssac became the vice-amiral (vice-admiral) of Guyenne, Poitou and Aunis.

Having inherited an unfavourable civil war in the kingdom, Henry came to terms with the rebels in the Edict of Beaulieu in May 1576 by which large concessions were granted to the Protestants. This generous peace aroused the indignation of many Catholics who formed a league in the 'defence of the Catholic religion'. Lanssac affiliated himself with the movement, frustrated at Henry for the lack of recognition he had been granted. To this end he received the duc de Guise (who had also aligned himself with the movement) at his governate of Bourg-sur-Gironde.

The Estates General of 1576 was dominated by representatives from this Catholic ligue, the king was urged to bring about the destruction of Protestantism. Henry was thus committed to break off the peace established at Beaulieu and resume the war with the Protestants. During this brief war the royal favourite the sieur de Saint-Mégrin fought a losing battle in the Angoumois against the forces of the Protestant king of Navarre. Seeking to gain entry to Bordeaux he was refused, the city suspicious of his true loyalties due to the support of his elder brother for the king of Navarre. However, irrespective of the prohibition put on Saint-Mégrin by the parlement of Bordeaux, Lanssac trusted him, and opened his governate of Blaye to the royal favourite.

=== Sixth war of religion and Brouage ===
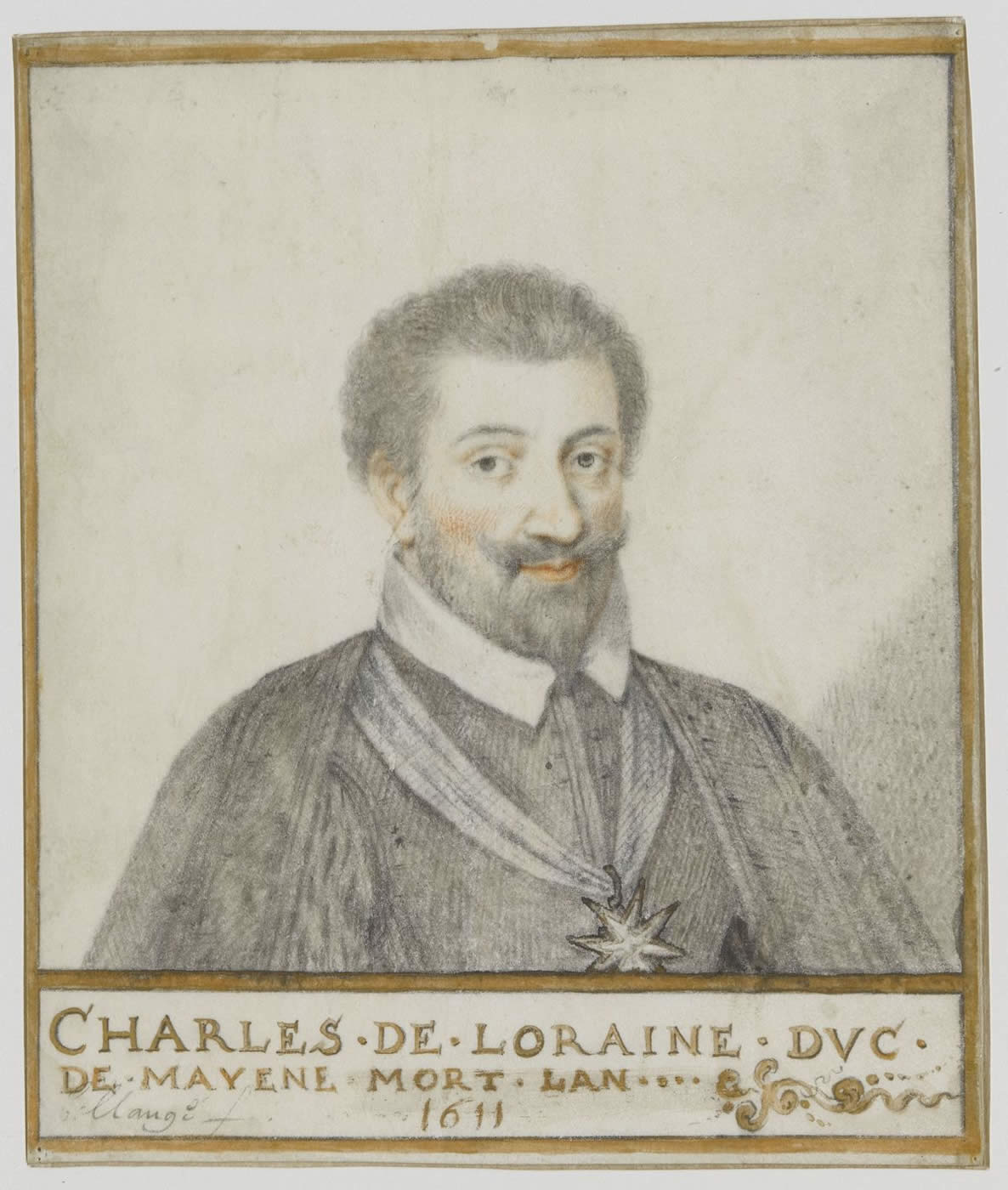
Duc de Mayenne co-leader of the siege against Protestant held Brouage

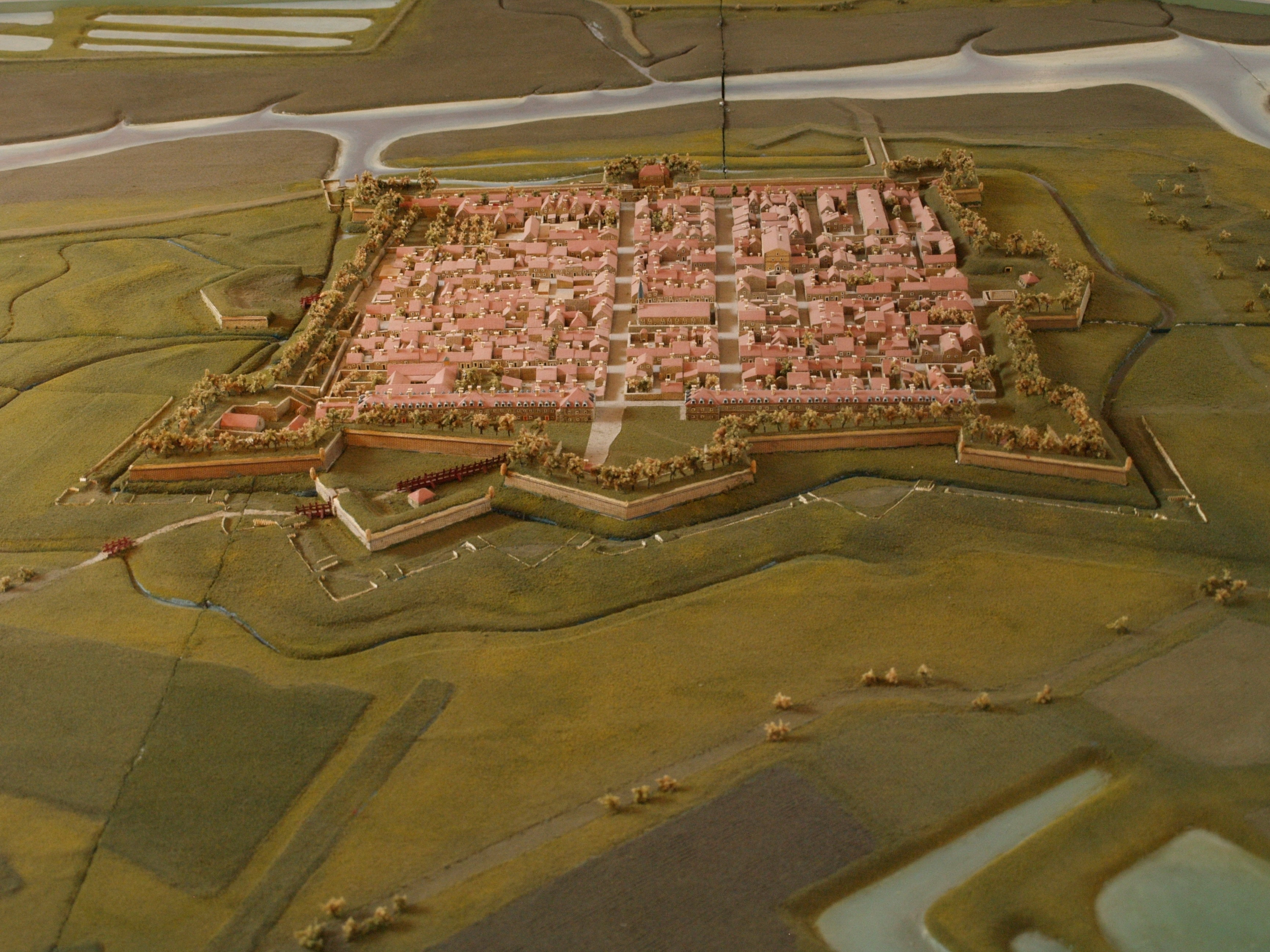
Seventeenth-Century model of Brouage

Having been without a compagnie d'ordonnance since his first was disbanded, in February 1577 Lanssac received a new command, and his new compagnie would serve under the marquis de Villars in Bordeaux.

In May 1577 he was made the lieutenant-général (lieutenant-general) of the Guyenne fleet. He thus armed a flotilla at Bordeaux for war against the Protestants. He placed the majority of his force outside La Rochelle then made a doomed attempt to seize the Île de Ré.

During the sixth French War of Religion in 1577 the town of Brouage near La Rochelle became a subject of the campaign. Brouage combined a most significant tactical position and was also the regional capital for salt production making it a rich target. The town was held by the Protestant rebels, with the prince de Condé inspecting the town and its surrounds in early June so as to assess their defences. On 22 June it was put to siege from land by the royal army under the duc de Mayenne and from sea by the seigneur de Lanssac who was in command of eighteen ships. Those inside Brouage looked to La Rochelle and the Île d'Oléron for support, but found none forthcoming. Four days after the siege had begun, the prince de Condé attempted to force his ships into the harbour of Brouage, but a storm threw him back. He then made a new attempt on 9 July, but this time it was forces under the seigneur de Lanssac that frustrated his designs. A new attack was made to break into the harbour on 11 July which was similarly unsuccessful. Not long thereafter (on 16 July), the maréchal de Monluc brought five galleys to reinforce the royalist stranglehold on Brouage. This force successfully unified with the ships under Lanssac's command at the harbour.

Though the besieged would hold out for some more weeks, they capitulated to the royalists on 16 or 18 August. After the Protestants had departed from Brouage on 28 August, Lanssac was established as the governor of the strategic town. Though Brouage was very small it enjoyed a port with fairly deep waters, the ability to control the coast between La Rochelle and Bordeaux and rich saltworks. Alongside this posting he was made governor of the Île de Ré, the Île d'Oléron and Marennes in recognition of his naval service. The victorious royalists seized the salt reserves of Brouage, and with the consent of the king the profit of 200,000 écus (or 600,000 livres) was divided between Lanssac, Mayenne and Strozzi.

On 17 September 1577 France returned to internal peace with the establishment of the Peace of Bergerac. The edict that brought the conflict to a close prohibited the boarding of vessels. Nevertheless, Lanssac boarded Rochelais (those belonging to the people of La Rochelle) and English vessels. This severely damaged his prospects of royal recognition. The king disavowed his actions, and his father was forced to apologise for him to the English ambassador.

=== Naval fantasies ===
With the successful conclusion of the 1577 campaign, Lanssac's sights turned to the prospect of a campaign against the Spanish Capitanía General de Santo Domingo (Captaincy General of Santo-Domingo) in the Caribbean. Alongside him for the organising of this were Strozzi (with whom he had been involved in the aborted Peruvian mission of 1572) and a Breton named La Roche (likely in fact the marquis de La Roche who served as governor of Morlaix and many years later the lieutenant-général au Canada). Lanssac was a particular cause of concern to the Spanish, so they embarked upon efforts to win him over to their side.

During the summer of 1578 his attentions turned to Cyprus on the grounds it had previously been held by the Lusignan family (from whom he claimed descent). He began to undertake preparations at Le Havre for the launching of an attack against this island. He declared he was willing to devote 4,000 men and 50,000 écus to the operation. Via his younger brother the abbot of Saint-Lô he got in touch with the Papal nunzio (Papal ambassador) to present the case for the attack. The Venetians however had just made peace with the Ottoman Empire, and were not ready to rekindle the conflict at the present time. The project went nowhere.

A reconciliation in the Autumn of 1578 between the duc de Guise, don Juan (governor of the Spanish Netherlands) and the Spanish ambassador Vargas was facilitated by Lanssac. After this time, Lanssac became an informer to the Spanish ambassador Vargas. With his relief from command of Brouage, Lanssac would share his bitter feelings on the matter with the Spanish ambassador. The historian Le Roux characterises this treasonous turn as a product of his royal disgrace.

=== Disgrace ===
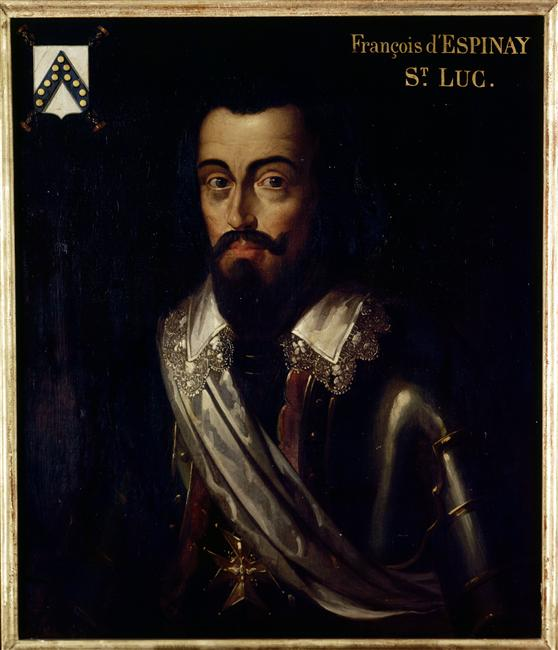
Seigneur de Saint-Luc who succeeded Lanssac as the governor of Brouage

In December 1578, the governate of Brouage was purchased from Lanssac by the royal favourite the seigneur de Saint-Luc for 20,000 écus or 65,740 livres. Le Roux speculates that he was compelled to discharge himself from the office by the king. On 10 February 1579 Lanssac accompanied the new governor into Brouage. Though he was theoretically due to receive a large sum of money in return for his relief, by April 1579 Lanssac had only received 6,900 livres. The replacement of Lanssac by Saint-Luc was viewed as a dark omen by the Protestants of La Rochelle, who looked upon Saint-Luc even more dimly than they had Lanssac. No sooner had he been installed in February, than Saint-Luc wrote bitterly to the duc de Nevers complaining of the disorder in Brouaqe, which he attributed to the length of Lanssac's administration.

Though he had facilitated a Spanish design in 1578, Lanssac continued to intrigue against Spanish colonial possessions. Planning out of Le Havre where there was less exposure to Spanish agents he sent out two ships into the 'Indies' in March 1579. The ships were troubled by poor weather, and a month later they were still on the coast of France (around Blaye).

At this time Le Roux argues he was in theory well entrenched in royal service. With an on paper annual incomes of 14,500 livres and further profit from the ship toll of Blaye. This presented a more perfect picture than the reality. The campaign to seize Brouage had cost Lanssac a great deal due to the need to take the costs to arm his ships and supply his troops, in addition to the fact some were lost at sea. The historian puts the costs at around 113,853 livres for the former costs. It would only be in the summer of 1579 that he and his fiscal partner André du Broca would be reimbursed through the trésorier général (general treasurer) of Bordeaux. Further his regular incomes were paid sporadically, and other payments he sought as related to the 1577 campaign were still under discussion at the conseil d'État in 1580. Going forward from 1577 he struggled to receive payment for his royal pension.

As a result of these fiscal troubles, Lanssac frequently had to borrow money both from bourgeois and also great nobles such as La Châtre or the comte de Maulévrier. Despite having this cash at his disposal, he proved unable to provide the sums for the purchases he made.

=== Treason ===
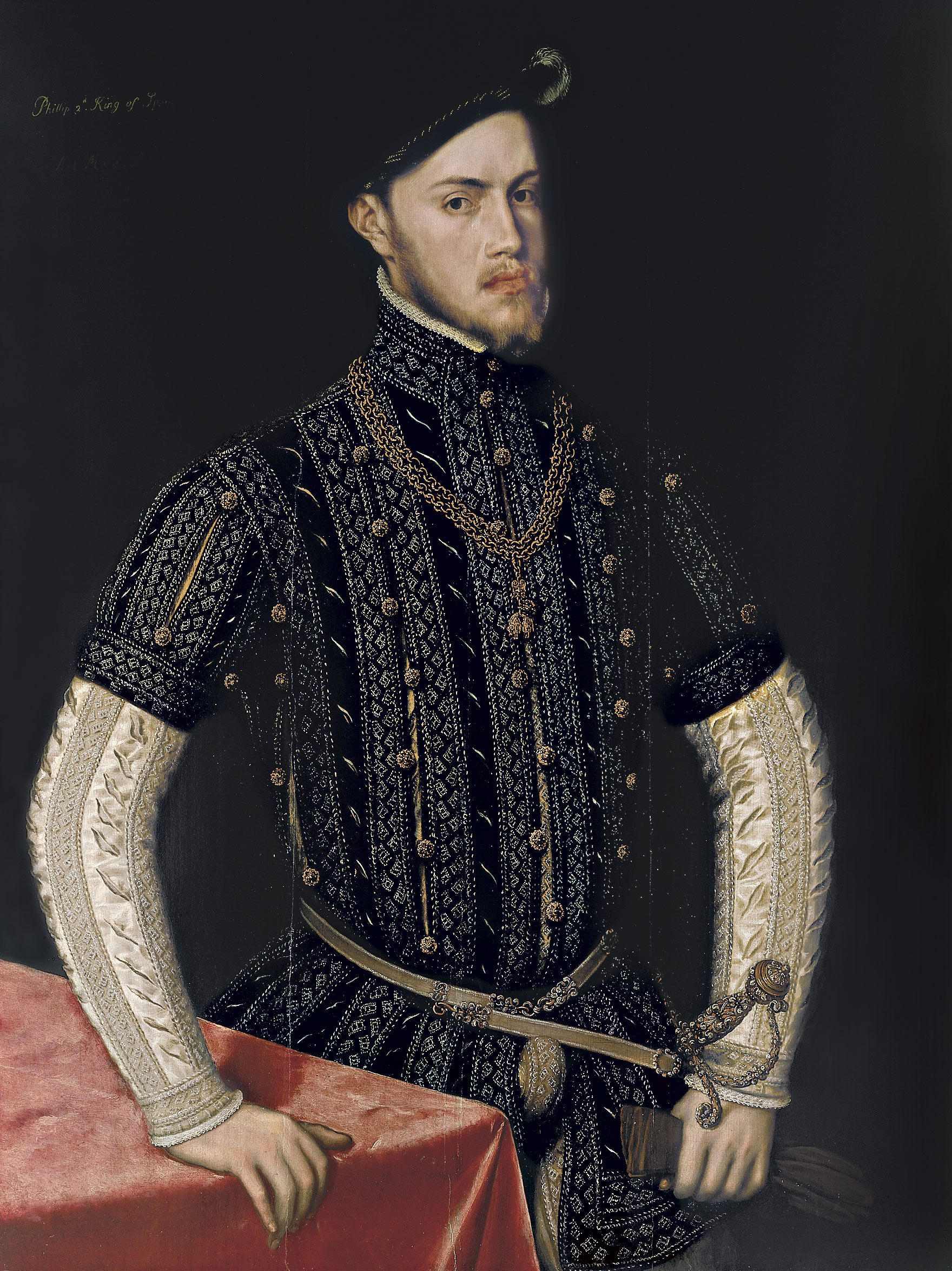
Philip II, king of Spain, with whom Lanssac would intrigue

Lanssac involved himself in a conspiracy to seize the Moroccan port city of Al Araish in August 1579. Emissaries were sent by him to the Spanish king Philip II to propose taking the city. On the pretext of meeting with a nephew he himself met with Philip, meanwhile a ship under his authority travelled to Al Araish on a commercial mission. Unfortunately for him his scheme was quickly uncovered by the French ambassador in Spain the baron de Saint-Gouard. Le Roux states that it was Philip himself who revealed the scheme to the French ambassador. Saint-Gouard tasked his sécretaire the sieur de Longlée with digging further into the affair. The Spanish ambassador in Paris complained to Philip later that month that it was necessary to keep a close eye on Saint-Gouard as the depths of details he knew about Lanssac's scheme implied he was in contact with those who were greatly in the know.

Upon knowledge of Lanssac's actions reaching the French court Catherine urged her son the king to get an explanation out of Lanssac. Lanssac's own father confessed to Catherine he would prefer his son to die to this betrayal.

=== Portuguese succession crisis ===
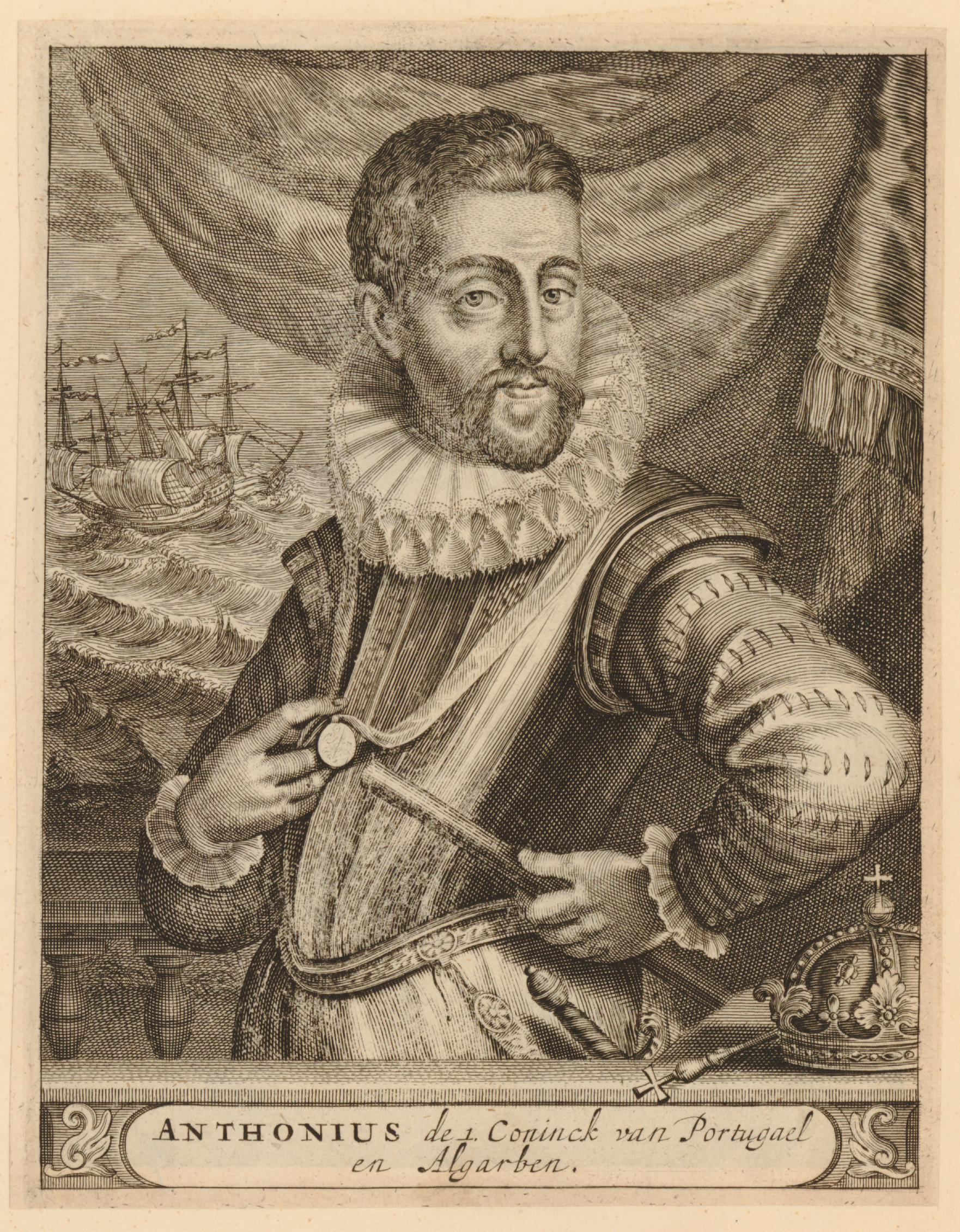
Preferred French candidate for the Portuguese throne, the prior do Crato

On 31 January 1580, the king of Portugal died. He was without heir and there were two claimants to the throne. Firstly the Spanish king Philip II, and secondly the prior do Crato (prior of Crato). Catherine championed the cause of the prior do Crato and all the principal members of the Saint-Gelais family had a part to play in this mission. Lanssac's father liaised with the English ambassador on the situation, Lanssac's half brother the bishop of Comminges undertook an extraordinary diplomatic mission to Spain. In April, it was alleged that Lanssac himself, alongside his old compatriot Strozzi, and under the authority of the king's brother Alençon was planning an expedition to Portugal.

In the spring of 1580, an agent of Lanssac's who was about to depart for Spain was arrested in Bayonne. At this time Lanssac was again planning an expedition either to the Indies or to effect the earlier Moroccan scheme he had concocted. The arrest of his agent was a product of the fact that it was alleged he was actually intending to ally himself with Philip again for an operation on the Barbary Coast. Even though his agent had been arrested, Lanssac was declared innocent by the king. This demonstrated that he still enjoyed some confidence from the king.

=== Invasion of the Azores ===
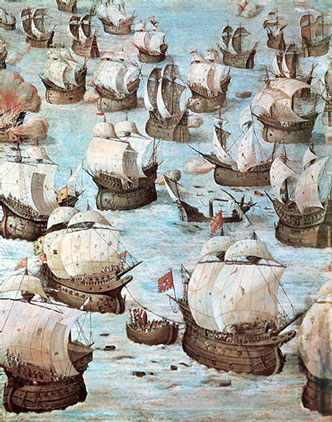
Battle of Ponta Delgada at which the French mission was crushed

Governing Blaye proved to be a very expensive posting due to the requirements of financing the towns defence during a time of military preparations. After the defeat of the prior do Crato and his flight from Portugal in August 1580 (later arriving in France), the attention of Catherine and Lanssac's compatriot Strozzi turned towards the capture of the Azores. The maritime specialists of the court: Lanssac, Strozzi, the grand prévôt Richelieu (grand provost) and the baron de La Garde all began devising plans with the constable of Portugal. It was dreamed that the capture of the Azores would serve as a staging ground for anti-Spanish operations and further expansion into Brasil. By the spring of 1581 Lanssac had been tapped for involvement in this expedition.

In August 1581 Lanssac and the leader of the expedition to the Azores, Strozzi rendezvoused at the residence of Lanssac's father, the château de La Mothe-Saint-Héray.

Relations between Strozzi and Lanssac would collapse in the winter of 1581 after Lanssac was snubbed for the role of colonel of the troops by Strozzi (in favour of the sieur de Sainte-Souline). Le Roux argues that Strozzi had a lot riding on the expedition, and did not fancy the competition Lanssac would have offered. He further argues that Strozzi had a habit of being unfaithful to his friends, noting the similar alienation he induced with Brantôme. Lanssac complained to the lieutenant-général of Guyenne, the maréchal de Matignon. Lanssac further challenged Strozzi to a duel though this would not transpire, and would later defect from the expedition with his two compagnies of 600 gentilhomme.

Survivance of the governorship of Blaye for his son was promised to Lanssac in January 1579. Nevertheless, by the end of the year he had surrendered both the governorship of Blaye and the position of vice-amiral to the baron d'Hervault for an estimated sum of 80,000 livres. On 11 January 1580, Lanssac signs a statement declaring that henceforth he takes no responsibility for developments at Blaye. On 23 April his resignations from Blaye and Brouage were ratified by the king on the grounds of his indisposition due to the needs of war. Hervault would not be permitted to go through with the transaction as the king believed him too young (he was nineteen) and suspectable to influence. Thus it would not be until October 1581 that Lanssac actually sold the governorship of Blaye, this time to the seigneur de Lussan, a trusted man of the king. In return Lanssac received 10,000 écus directly from the king. Lussan inherited Blaye in a pathetic state, Lanssac having done little to maintain it during his hold of the governate. In an inventory drawn up in 1583 after the handover it was assessed that the fortress town contained one cannon, six arquebuses and twenty seven halberds.

After surrendering these responsibilities under royal pressure, Lanssac was left with only the family government of Bourg-sur-Gironde.

The king's frustration at Lanssac had been furthered by the fact the noble had again raised soldiers on his own initiative with an aim to seizing Saint-Jean-d'Angély by surprise, campaigning in the area around the city. He had gone as far as to establish lines of communication with the Catholics of the city. Under pressure from the prince de Condé, Henri had disavowed Lanssac's actions in December 1581. This episode may have combined in the king's mind with the fact Lanssac had not ceased his treasonous schemes as regarded Spain.

Having fled from court, the disgraced royal favourite, the seigneur de Saint-Luc established himself at his governate of Brouage and wrote to the royal court begging for forgiveness and promising to serve the king well. In addition to this he endeavoured to form connections in the south-west and reached out to Lanssac (according to a letter from the latter to the maréchal de Matignon in January 1582). Saint-Luc also endeavoured to employ his military experience for the service of the king's brother the duc d'Alençon. Dealing with the king's brother only enraged Henri further.

Concurrent to this Catherine worked to smooth over relations between Strozzi and Lanssac. In January 1582 she had tasked the bishop of Dax with calming things between the two men. Nevertheless, it was reported in May 1582 that Lanssac had exchanged bitter words with the commander and was in a state of disgrace at court. Henri settled the matter in favour of Strozzi, with Lanssac not receiving the commission he desired as colonel.

In May 1582, the baron d'Arques (future duc de Joyeuse) received the appointment of amiral de France (the most senior naval post). In June Arques established his cousin de Chaste as commander of the armée de mer (army of the sea). The appointment of de Chaste to this office was a considerable frustration for Lanssac, who, in his capacity as vice-amiral de Guyenne fancied the posting for himself. His embitterment at this snub was one of the factors that would drive him towards the Catholic ligue.

Lanssac's frustrated appeal to Matignon to deliver him justice as regarded the Azores expedition yielded him nothing. In the appeal, he noted that he had 'served and loved' Strozzi for eighteen years. He further cited his need to fulfil an action appropriate of his status in society and secure royal favour. Matignon was unmoved by all of Lanssac's arguments. Indeed, he had the soldiers Lanssac had raised dismissed. By June the invasion fleet was finally assembled at Belle-Île under the command of the comte de Brissac. The force would seize Madeira, and then Brissac would head to Cape Verde while Strozzi made an attack against Brasil. The expedition was a disaster, crushed by the Spanish at Ponta Delgada, Strozzi was taken by the Spanish commander the marqués de Santa Cruz (marquis of Santa-Cruz) and executed. With the destruction of the expedition, came the death of the prospects of the prior do Crato to assume a place on the Portuguese throne. Alongside the arrival of news of the defeat of the expedition came word that Henri intended for de Chaste to take charge of the planned counter-stroke against the Spanish, rather than Lanssac.

=== Turn to Alençon ===
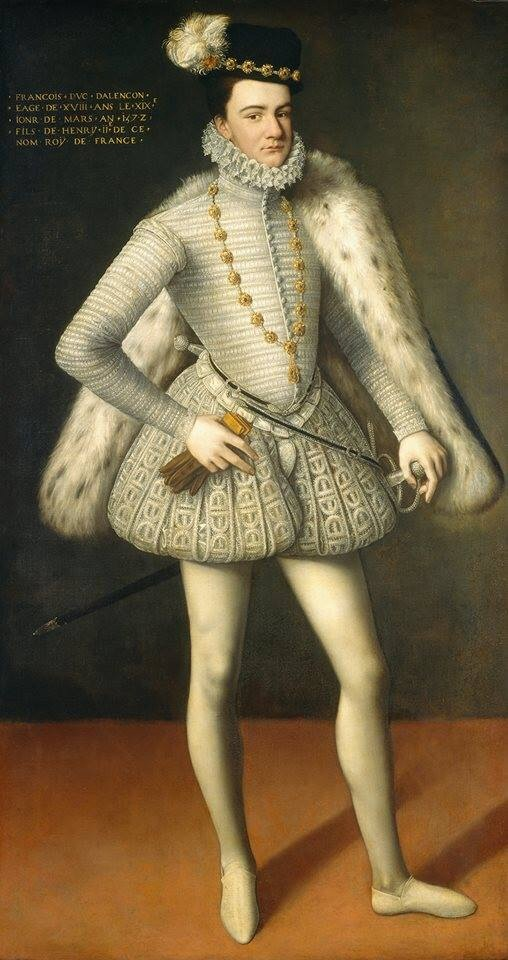
Duc d'Alençon, brother to Henry III, who rebuffed Lanssac's advances in early 1584, and whose death triggered a succession crisis

Staring down the barrel of royal disgrace, Lanssac retired to his wife's seigneurie of Puycalvary. Lanssac turned to the king's brother, the duc d'Alençon as an alternative path towards advancement. He had in fact entered the duc d'Alençon's household in 1575 as a chambellan with an income of 600 livres and a pension of a further 2,000. He was decidedly a secondary figure in the ducs household behind figures such as the seigneur de Fervaques or La Châtre however. Relations between the two were disrupted for several years, and Le Roux speculates this might be due to Lanssac's relations with the duc de Nevers, who was charged with arresting Alençon in 1575. Contact between Alençon and Lanssac was renewed in 1581 at the start of the princes Dutch campaigns, with Lanssac tapped to take a leadership role in the 1581 expedition. However Lanssac was too busy with his naval exploits to involve himself in future Dutch affairs.

In November 1583 he made his approach to the duc d'Alençon through the maréchal de Biron who had led the ducs army in the Netherlands. He set out a long proposal to the latter figure. In this document he first outlined the ruin that had befallen him as a result of the Azores expedition and his time in charge of the government of Blaye. He then expounded upon his proposals for the prince. They would seize Cape Verde, the Canary Islands, Cuba and Santo-Domingo from the Spanish. These would then be exchanged with the Spanish crown for control of Spanish the Netherlands. This project would require 20 500 tonne ships and a further 20 smaller vessels. The larger ships would be crewed by 200 soldiers and 100 sailors, while the smaller ships by 30 sailors. The vessels would be armed in the Netherlands and then depart in January 1584, to be back by July. They would seize the wealth of the islands and the treasure feet, the latter of which alone would be worth 12,000,000 in gold.

The first target would be the Canary Islands, which after being looted would be abandoned due to their proximity to Spain. Cape Verde would be seized and fortified. Santo Domingo would be won through an alliance with escaped slaves known as the 'chamarrons' whose number he put at around 1,000. This alliance would be bought by the provision of land for them to grow sugar on. From Santo Domingo, Puerto Rico would easily fall. Finally Havana in Cuba would be taken (in Lanssac's estimation this would be easy due to the poor quality of the defences) with a garrison left in the city before the fleet returned to its home, passing the Azores to the north. By specifying the passage well north of the Azores on the grounds of their superior defences he differentiated his plan from Strozzi's disastrous expedition in the hopes of making it more credible. He laid out no specific place in the mission for himself, offering command to the maréchal de Biron's son the seigneur de Saint-Blancard. Lanssac had never crossed the Atlantic, but he was immersed in the naval world to the point where he had a fairly accurate understanding of Spanish colonial defences acquired from sailors.

Lanssac had picked his moment very poorly to deliver this plan to Alençon. The prince had lost the confidence of the Dutch after his attempt to seize Antwerp in January 1583, and was facing a financial ruin of his own. Lanssac ceased to appear on the roles of members of the ducal household by March 1584. In addition to the poor confidence Alençon had with the Dutch, the prince was gravely ill, and having retired to Château-Thierry, the duc died on 10 June.

=== Ligue crisis ===
Lanssac was at this time consumed by crushing debts. His relationship with the crown continued to be dismal. Henri even sent a scathing letter to him, warning him not to partake in a local quarrel between the Catholic vicomte de Duras and the Protestant vicomte de Turenne. As a result of all this Lanssac turned to the Catholic ligue.

The Catholic ligue had come back to the fore as with the death of Alençon, the heir to the French throne (due to Henri's childlessness) was now the Protestant king of Navarre. This was seized on as unacceptable by segments of the Catholic nobility who re-founded the Catholic ligue (league) in opposition to this succession (seeking instead to put Navarre's Catholic uncle the cardinal de Bourbon on the throne) under the leadership of the duc de Guise.

=== Joinville ===
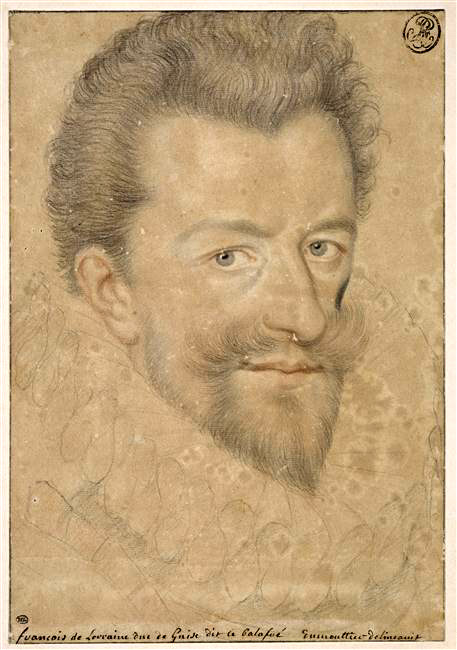
Duc de Guise leader of the Catholic Ligue

On 17 January 1585, the ligueur duc de Guise, his brother the duc de Mayenne and their cousins the duc d'Aumale and duc d'Elbeuf entered into a secret agreement with the king of Spain. The formation of this international agreement was facilitated both by Lanssac and his illegitimate half-brother the bishop of Comminges who enjoyed strong contacts with the Spanish agents that operated in the south of the kingdom. The Saint-Gelais brothers facilitated the passage of the Spanish agent Juan de Moreo (a commander of the Order of Malta) through the Val d'Aran and Comminges. They received Moreo for a meeting in Bourg-sur-Gironde at which the planned ligueur uprising in Guyenne was formulated before sending him on north to Joinville. The terms of the Treaty of Joinville were firstly that the Spanish king would recognise the cardinal de Bourbon as heir to the French throne. Philip promised to support the Lorraine-Guise party in France to the tune of 600,000 écus of which 400,000 would be advanced via the duc de Lorraine. In return for receipt of these subsidies Guise would make a number of commitments. He would see Protestantism annihilated in France, he would see the Tridentine Decrees adopted in the French kingdom, he would see Philip restored to possession of Cambrai. French support against the Protestant rebels in the Spanish Netherlands was also expected, as was the severing of the Franco-Ottoman alliance and the cessation of hostile French naval activity in the Spanish colonies. By special articles even more concessions were made to Spain: the ceding of French Navarre and Béarn to the Spanish and the delivery of the pretender to the Portuguese throne, the prior do Crato, who currently held up in France.

While getting Henry III to concede to all these objectives would be challenging, Philip saw benefit in the arrangement regardless.

Many great seigneurs were drawn towards the Catholic ligue. The duc de Nevers felt that Henri maintained him at a distance. The former royal favourites (who had since been disgraced) D'O and the seigneur de Saint-Luc joined the cause. For Lanssac and the comte de Brissac both men were the sons of fixtures of the French court who felt that their efforts to gain Henri had poured cold water on their attempts to build a relationship with him.

In late March 1585, the seigneur de La Rochette, a ligueur agent in the service of the cardinal de Guise was arrested by the crown. He had chartered a ship loaded with weapons which was making its way to Châlons when it was intercepted on 12 March. He was subsequently arrested and then interrogated as to the nature of his affairs. According to the dispatch of the English ambassador on 29 March La Rochette provided a broad breakdown of the ligue parties military organisation. The duc de Nevers was supposedly to lead a force out of Italy to surprise Lyon. The Spanish king Philip was to be raising troops in the Empire that would invade France. The duc de Guise would command the French cavalry, his brother the duc de Mayenne would serve as colonel-général de l'infantrie (colonel-general of the infantry), Lanssac, Saint-Luc and the comte de Brissac would serve as maréchaux de camp (camp marshals) while Saint-Florian, Beauvais Nangis and La Rochette himself would enjoy the position of maître de camp in the ligueur army.

=== War with the crown ===
Now out in the open, Guise issued the Péronne manifesto on 31 March, which urged the Catholic's of France to stand firm against attempts to subvert the kingdoms religion and state by the duc d'Épernon and the king of Navarre. It was further demanded that the Estates General be called tri-annually and that extraordinary subsidies and applications of the taille imposed during the reign of Henri be abolished. The location was chosen to call-back to the earlier Catholic ligue which had been established in Péronne in 1576.

Among the great nobles for the ligue, Saint-Luc held Brouage, d'O was governor of Caen and the seigneur d'Entragues held the same office in Orléans. Lanssac whose stormy reputation had inspired the distaste of both Catherine and the king joined with the rebellion, as did the younger son of the maréchal de Tavannes, the vicomte de Tavannes and several great Provençal seigneurs (the sieur de Vins and the comte de Suze). Lanssac enjoyed the position of leader of the ligue in the Bordelais.

A diplomatic mission to Spain conducted by a ligueur agent in the service of the vicomte de Duras transpired in April. According to the French ambassador this agent argued that the ligue position in Guyenne was very strong, and that the duc de Guise could count on more allies in the province than could the Protestant king of Navarre. This agent sought financial and military assistance from Philip, the former of which was soon received with a shipment of money to the border. The French ambassador further alleged the complicity of Lanssac and the seigneur de Vaillac (governor of the château Trompette in Bordeaux) in this subversive effort in his diplomatic despatch to Henri. It is possible, though not a certainty that either Lanssac himself or an agent of his travelled to Hondarribia in April to receive part of the money promised to the ligue by Philip. Going forward he would be one of the chief suspects of the French ambassador.

The king of Navarre's wife, Marguerite aligned herself with the ligueur cause in Guyenne alongside Lanssac, his half-brother the bishop of Comminges, the seigneur de Lussan, the seigneur de Saint-Luc and Lanssac's brother in law the comte de Luxe (who had married Lanssac's sister Claude in 1564). While they would hope for military support from Spain it would only be financial support that was provided. Further frustration was found in the fact this financial aid arrived too late to aid Marguerite who had to flee to Auvergne.

Before her flight, Lanssac played a role in securing Agen for Marguerite.

From the south-west of the kingdom, Lanssac, alongside his half-brother the bishop of Comminges looked to bring about the conquest of Montauban, Castres and other Protestant held towns by driving the Catholic nobility into arms. He met with Saint-Luc, Lussan and the vicomte d'Aubeterre in Bourg where the plans for the uprising were drawn up.

Lanssac rendezvoused with Saint-Luc in Brouage in April and May, and acted as a go-between connecting Saint-Luc with the royal lieutenant-general of Guyenne the maréchal de Matignon. The two went on campaign with the aim of creating a blockade against Protestant held La Rochelle. Lanssac then prepared naval vessels for combat and attempted to relieve the siege of Bourg before instead blockading Bordeaux. The two ligueurs saw to the building of a fort at Bec d'Ambès which held a strategic position on the rivers at the confluence of the Dordogne and Garonne. However, at the end of June this fort was seized and then immediately destroyed by the royalist commander the maréchal de Matignon. In the summer Lanssac and Saint-Luc with a squadron of around 30 ships attempted to besiege La Rochelle and harass the coast of Saintonge. Other operations at Alet, Castres and in Basse-Navarre were also undertaken. Ultimately however, the ligue failed to gain a secure footing in Guyenne. By the Autumn, Saint-Luc was back in Brouage, where he fought off an attempted siege by the prince de Condé in September.

The new governor of Saintonge, the baron de Bellegarde (who had succeeded to the charge in January 1585) found his efforts to instil royal authority in his province challenged by the nearby presence of Lanssac in Blaye and Saint-Luc in Brouage.

=== Naval pirate ===
Internal peace between the crown and the Catholic ligue was re-established by the means of the Treaty of Nemours in July 1585. The next month, on 12 August, Henri wrote to the maréchal de Matignon to forward the complaints of the English queen concerning Lanssac. Henri explained that Elizabeth had informed him that Lanssac had pursued English vessels to La Rochelle, with some seized and pillaged. The king had been asked to explain these actions by the English ambassador in light of the friendship between the two kingdoms. Lanssac was to return his 'prizes' and Matignon was to ensure this came to pass. Matignon was also to aid in the termination of a tax of 20 sol (solidus) Lanssac had instituted in Blaye on every tonne of English goods. The seigneur de Lussan would take the lead on resolving this indiscretion of Lanssac's. As such the king also wrote to Lussan and Lanssac himself. To the latter Henri stressed the need to return what he had taken and noted that Elizabeth was asked to do the same with her subjects.

In the spring of 1586, several of Lanssac's agents were reported to be in Hondarribia and funds reached Lanssac from the Spanish crown.

In May 1586, Henri made efforts to bring Lanssac back in from the cold of his disgrace. A naval reorganisation was under way under the leadership of Joyeuse and the comte de Retz, however to Lanssac's immense frustration he was subordinated to de Chaste in this project.

That same month, May 1586, the English government reported on a scheme of Lanssac's to rob naval vessels. Acting on this design Lanssac had entered the Garonne with six ships and set about robbing both Catholic and Protestant vessels indiscriminately, solely working towards his own aggrandisement. He blockaded Bordeaux and it was observed by the Parisian memoirist L'Estoile that he took the side of 'neither the king, nor Guise, nor Navarre'. Though he proclaimed he was operating in service of the king, the maréchal de Matignon set to work combatting this act of rebellion. L'Estoile reports in December that in frustration of the impediment to the trade of Bordeaux that he represented, the parlement of the city had decreed that he might be freely attacked.

To the amazement of the Savoyard ambassador René de Lucinge, Henri succeeded in re-opening lines of communication with Lanssac at the start of 1588. Henri was working towards the project of breaking away great seigneurs from the ligue, and in this effort he succeeded in somewhat detaching Lanssac from the duc de Guise.

Until Spring 1588, Guise's strategy revolved around the application of military pressure on the king to induce capitulations to his demands. At this time however, he began to take on a broader European perspective, affiliating himself with the Spanish plan to invade England. To this end he liaised with the Spanish ambassador in France - Mendoza - and Juan de Moreo. Moreo's intrigues were so vexing to Henri that the latter asked Lanssac to have him murdered.

By early 1588, the royal favourite the duc d'Épernon was greatly despised by many. As a result of this at some indeterminate point a plot was hatched to ambush him at the fair of Saint-Germain. The Papal nunzio Morosini and Tuscan Filippo Cavriana placed the incident in February 1588 and both describe Lanssac as the ring leader. Rather than avoiding Saint-Germain, after learning of the plot Épernon went to Saint-Germain to see if the rumour that had reached him was true. He was surrounded by his would be killers, but had already taken measures to avoid the situation escalating to bloodshed.

In March 1588, according to the despatches of the French ambassador in Spain, an agent of Lanssac's from Bordeaux, Masparant visited Spain to conduct negotiations between the Catholic ligue and Spanish crown. This agent would return again to Spain in June for further negotiations.

=== War with the crown ===
Facing the complete collapse of his authority after the ligueur Day of the Barricades in which he was driven from Paris, Henri resolved to have the duc de Guise assassinated in December 1588. This accomplished, the ligue entered rebellion against the crown in reaction and began seizing cities.

In February 1589, the city of Le Mans was won for the ligue. Lanssac was established as the ligueur governor of the city. The rebellious noble offered his half-brother, the bishop of Comminges the bishopric of Le Mans, however Comminges declined the offer, explaining to the Spanish king that he could better serve him in the south.

Starting in March 1589, Lanssac no longer declared his allegiance to Henry III when describing his position as capitaine de cinquante hommes d'armes, rather than being the ordonnances du roi these gentilhomme soldiers he commanded were the ordonnances de France for the 'service of god and the Catholic's of the kingdom'. Alongside the role of conseiller d'État this was the extent of the offices he held for the ligue.

=== Maine ===
Serving the ligue in Maine (where his wife possessed the seigneurie de Ballon to the north of Le Mans), Lanssac oversaw the capture of the château de Touvoie, the seigneurie de l'Épichelière and the town of La Flèche. Having done this he demanded the city council of Le Mans compensate him for the expenditure of the effort to the sum of 40,000 écus, something which they agreed to do.

In August 1589, Henry III was in turn assassinated. For the royalists he was succeeded by his Protestant heir, the king of Navarre who took the name Henry IV. For the ligue the king was the cardinal de Bourbon under the name Charles X, though he was in royalist captivity.

== Reign of Henry IV ==
=== Prisoner of Boisdauphin ===
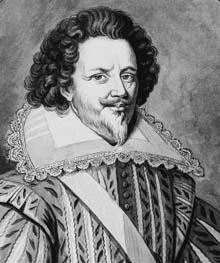
Boisdauphin ligueur commander with whom Lanssac clashed and who would have Lanssac arrested

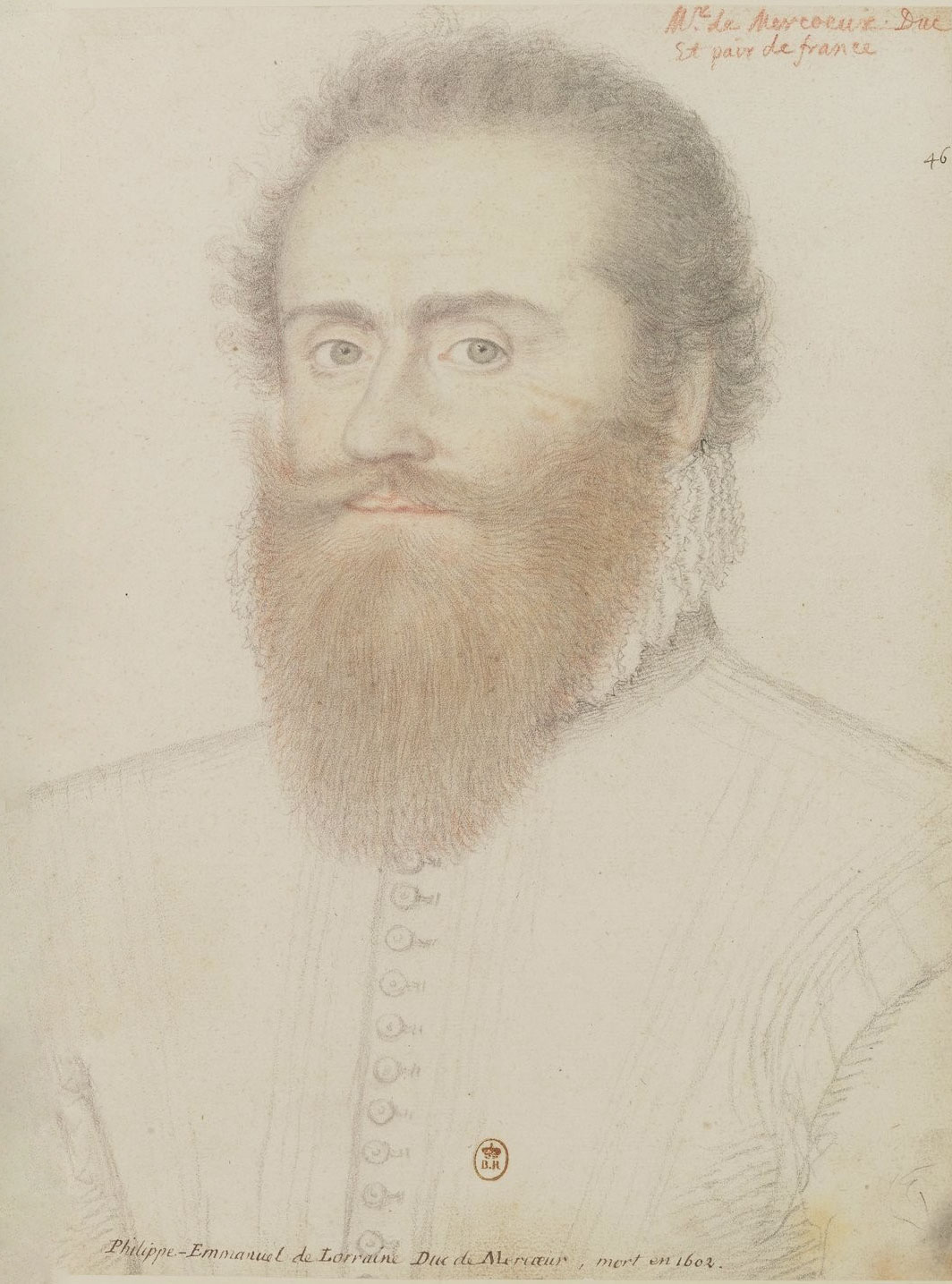
Duc de Mercœur, leader of the Ligue in Brittany

Lanssac found himself in conflict with his fellow ligueur commander Boisdauphin in Maine. Boisdauphin alleged that Lanssac was seeking to oust him from his pre-eminent position in the comté by means of continual intrigue. In addition to this charge Lanssac was accused of prioritising a policy of personal aggrandisement over the wider cause. As a result of this suspicion, Boisdauphin had Lanssac arrested and put in the custody of a noble named Le Riablé in the château-du-Loir in December 1589.

Lanssac was able to escape the captivity imposed on him by his compatriots and returned to being an active member of the ligueur cause.

On 21 December 1589, Le Mans was conquered by the royalists.

=== Brittany ===
Now operating in Brittany, Lanssac maintained an independent position from the ligueur governor of the province, the duc de Mercœur (who was left with only theoretical control of the ligue outside of Nantes). As such Lanssac freely proposed projects to the ligues Spanish allies on his own initiative. These plans included the conquest of various ports, and ways for the Spanish to gain the loyalty of various nobles of Brittany.

In March 1590, Lanssac would unsuccessfully attempt to reconquer the city of Le Mans for the duc de Mercœur. This effort was followed on 5 April with the capture of Mayenne and the attempted siege of its château. Mayenne was quickly recaptured within 15 days by the royal governor of Alençon, the sieur de Hertré. Lanssac lost several hundred men and his ensign in the process. On 6 June he departed Vannes with a naval squadron and made his way to the aid of Mercœur.

Le Roux argues it is possible that this fragmented nature of the ligue in Brittany may have helped enable it to be the most long lasting of the ligueur presences in the French kingdom.

To the considerable frustration of the royalist party in Brittany, on 11 June 1590 the town of Le Blavet (now known as Port-Louis) at the mouth of the Blavet was put to siege by a combined offensive from the marquis de Chaussin, attacking from land and Lanssac attacking from the sea (having eluded English privateers). The attack was conducted with 'great fury' and succeeded in taking the town. Thanks to this effort, a bridgehead was opened by which the Spanish could land an expeditionary party under the command of the Spanish officer Águila in Brittany on 28 October. The Spanish immediately began the construction of a fortress in the town. By the means of this coup, the Spanish supported Mercœur in the capture of Hennebont further up the river Blavet and fortified the mouth of the river which became a crucial hub for Spanish communications with the Breton ligue and coordinating their naval activities. Lanssac was rewarded for his part in delivering Le Blavet to the Spanish with 48,000 ducats. It would be held by the Spanish until peace with France was established by the Treaty of Vervins in 1598.

His half-brother the bishop of Comminges, who was active in the south of France was scheming at this time to facilitate a Spanish invasion across the Pyrénées into Comminges (a fiercely Catholic region that connected the border to Toulouse), that would reduce the local Protestant strongholds, head down the Garonne first to Toulouse and then conquer Bordeaux before marching up into Brittany. Lanssac controlled one of the two key settlements that would facilitate this project (Bourg-sur-Gironde) while the seigneur de Lussan who governed Blaye would be bribed to support the project. This bribe was successfully executed. It was hoped that by using these strongpoints a supplementary Spanish force could arrive by sea like had happened at Le Blavet. To support the coming army the bishop of Comminges looked to the local estates to ensure the proper provision of the Spanish force. The bishop of Comminges having conducted a successful embassy to Spain, Philip began preparing an army in Aragón for an intervention into Guyenne (alongside his planned interventions in Languedoc, Brittany and Paris). When at the end of 1591 a Spanish army set off, it would not be able to penetrate France. Lanssac offered support to his half brother in this ultimately unrealised project. He hoped to maintain Spanish access to the Gironde.

=== Ambitious projects ===
In May 1591, Lanssac travelled to Madrid to assume the role of a representative of the Sainte Union. He was keen to impress upon the Spanish king the importance of a large intervention across the Pyrenees. From May to July 1591 Lanssac would present the Spanish king Philip with around a dozen memoranda. In these memoranda, he operated fairly independently both of Mercœur and of the duc de Mayenne.

The narratives of these memoranda focused on Brittany and Guyenne with Lanssac displaying considerable geographic knowledge. He painted a picture for Philip of a unification of France and Spain under the authority of the Spanish crown. While it was good for Philip to financially support the Catholic ligue it was imperative military involvement followed. He proposed the dispatch of various agents to bring to arms the Gascons of Southern France and a small force to restore the position of Catholics in French Navarre. Soldiers would fight under the authority of Lanssac's brother-in-law the comte de Luxe, the governor of Dax would be bought for the ligueur cause. Bayonne would be blockaded, and Bordeaux put to siege. After the Gascon nobility were subjugated Philip would control Aquitaine and unify it with Spain, thereby reforming the territory held by the Goths in late-classical times. From here, Philip would move to secure all the saltworks of France by which he could have the kingdom at his mercy, as well as those of England and the Netherlands. Lanssac stated he would be happy to take lead of the naval army (the generous granting of command to him would have the benefit of winning the hearts of French seigneurs) that would seize Brouage, Bourgneuf, Le Croisic and the Morbihan. However he asserted that if Philip did not wish to put him in a position of command he would happily serve as a simple soldier in the 'great cause', as he had nothing more to lose. He informed Philip that his lands had been usurped by the Protestants and the ligueurs had not rewarded him as they should for his service.

In a second memorandum he discussed the conquest of Brittany. He proposed the seigneur de Chasteauneuf, governor of Brest be bribed so the Spanish might establish themselves in the city. To win over the Bretons he proposed appealing to their nationalistic sentiments, and choosing the sieur de La Hautière as the new commander of the garrison of Brest. Philip would distribute gold chains, as was the habit of the dukes of Brittany. Moving on from Brest he would secure Port Navalo which was governed by La Hautière's brother Montigny. Lanssac proposed securing Montigny's loyalty by taking his children hostage. With these ports being secured, 2,000 soldiers would be sent to claim Saint-Nazaire, through which they would control Maine. Indeed, Lanssac had not forgotten his bitter rivalry with Boisdauphin. Lanssac would take command of these 2,000 soldiers, and Saint-Nazaire would be returned to the duc de Mercœur. Lanssac then envisioned capturing the château d'Ancenis, a possession of the captive ligueur duc d'Elbeuf. Elbeuf could in Lanssac's view, sell the château to Philip in return for the payment of his 100,000 écus ransom. With Brittany secured, Lanssac made it clear that the Breton's were an unworthy people, and should be treated "like Indians". Le Roux describes these memoranda as elucidating as much of Lanssac's vivid imagination as his temperament.

Indeed, Lanssac compared himself to Columbus in these affairs. While the explorer had 'discovered deserts', he would bring rich kingdoms to Philip. Philip himself did not buy into Lanssac's proposals, an advisor of his describing them as 'more noise than substance' similarly though they were not dismissed out of hand. The king would however afford Lanssac a residence in Madrid, and a pension of 2,400 livres alongside various valuable trinkets. Not having achieved his goal, Lanssac returned to France, where he set himself up in Alan alongside his half-brother, the bishop of Comminges, in the comté de Comminges on the southern edge of the kingdom where he hoped to inspire the peasant ligueurs.

=== Campanère Ligue ===
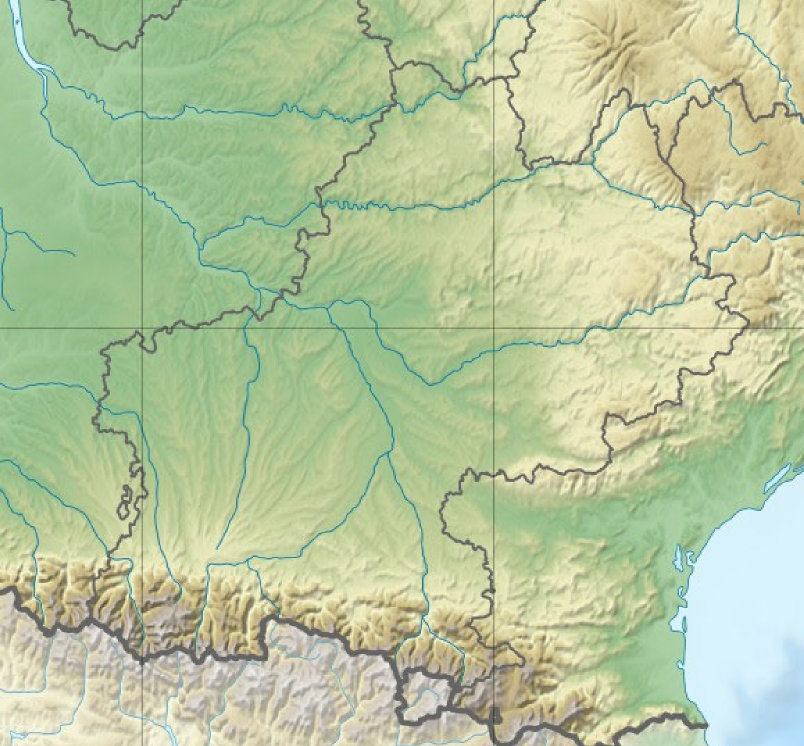
Places of relevance to the Campanère Ligue

During 1593, the bishop of Comminges became alienated from his ligueur ally the marquis de Villars. Word of this alienation reached the ears of the Spanish king, who was concerned at the prospect of his allies in France being drawn away from one another. Philip therefore informed the bishop that he remained in good understanding with the marquis and the duc de Joyeuse. In 1594, Lanssac and the bishop of Comminges explained to Philip that they remained ill-inclined to involve the marquis in their operations. In place of Villars in his operations, Comminges now inserted his half-brother into the marquis' role. The bishop remained concerned that Lanssac lacked the appropriate dignity for the unification of the coming invading Spanish army and the Commingois ligueur force.

A royalist satire, published in 1594, called La Satyre Ménippée that attacked the ligueur party made mention of both Lanssac and his brother. The idea of Lanssac as a religious pilgrim was parodied, insofar as it implied his great mobility in service of the Catholic cause. Both he and his brother were accused of mobilising many 'honest men' into their disorderly cause.

=== Lanssac's vision ===
On 14 February 1494 Lanssac wrote a memoire for the attention of the Spanish king Philip. In this document he sought to justify the decision of the ligueur estates of the comté de Comminges to mobilise the peasantry to arms. He explained that Philip would be happy to know that the people, clergy and much of the nobility of Gascogne had established 'syndics' and leaders for themselves for the purpose of resisting both heresy and the tax impositions imposed upon them by the royalist authorities: the maréchal de Matignon, and the marquis de Villars. This refusal had seen many good Catholics and bourgeois imprisoned. In response to their 'tyrannical' authorities (and in particular those of 'Vendôme' - by which was meant the royalist candidate for king Henry IV) the people had assembled an army for campaign of 12,000 men. When he learned that this army intended to see to the release of those who had refused to pay the taxes, the marquis de Villars had the prisoners released. Lanssac then explains that despite the subsequent withdrawal of the army the good Christian order that Philip hoped to bring about in France was strengthened by these anti-taxation endeavours. He explained to Philip that the Spanish king could control the mountain ligueurs like the French kings did the Swiss, ensuring they held the same customs and language as the Spanish. The bishop of Comminges then went on to propose the urgency of a Spanish military intervention, seeing the risk of Henry IV's victory in the civil war as being severe.

The zeal that both Comminges and Lanssac had for the service of the Spanish king was emphasised, with it being noted that they would devote not only their property but a thousand lives to the Spanish king's service. In return for their unique devotion to the Spanish crown, they requested that Philip ensure the maintenance of open corridors between the two kingdoms through Saint-Girons, Saint-Béat, Benasque, the Vallée d'Aure and Louron. To this end they requested the towns and châteaux of Saint-Girons, Saint-Béat, Saint-Bertrand, Saint-Gaudens, Montréjeau and Sarrancolin be seized by Philip so that they could serve the Spanish king. Philip would then bring about the passage into France of an army of 3,000 cavalry and 10,000 infantry which would seize the duchy of Brittany (with crossings undertaken at the Pyrenees and further soldiers coming up via the sea route.

Further specific military plans were presented by both Lanssac and his half-brother which leant on their understanding of military affairs, the location of their fiefdoms and Lanssac's military experience in Brittany fighting against the royalists. Independent of his brother, the bishop of Comminges addressed several more dispatches to Philip discussing ways to oppose Henry IV even in the new world.

Paranoid about his security, the bishop of Comminges sometimes refers to himself and the seigneur de Lanssac in the third person (though this occasionally slips into the first person). He also signed many of his letters in this period as 'Lanssac', despite their being his product.

=== Desperation ===
As various ligueurs began to defect to the royalist cause in 1594, including the seigneur de Caupėne who served as the ligueur governor of the sénéchausée of the Agenais and Condomois, and with the ligueur lieutenant-général Mayenne opening exploratory negotiations, Lanssac and his half-brother looked to the duc d'Épernon and the governor of Languedoc the duc de Montmorency to save the ligueur cause. Philip had long desired to win over the latter to his party. To this end, Lanssac travelled to Languedoc and Provence to meet with them. Meeting with Montmorency, the brothers were asked to seize Toulouse and the duc de Joyeuse. Montmorency noted the close relationship that both of their fathers had enjoyed with one another, and promised to keep his visit a secret. Le Roux argues that this visit in fact reflects the beginning of Lanssac hedging his bets, and that the reason for the meeting was more about opening communication lines with the royalist camp.

The houses of Saint-Gelais and Joyeuse had hatreds with one another that dated back to 1589. These were stoked in the summer of 1594 by Joyeuse's attempts to dislodge the bishop of Comminges from his base in Alan.

The bishop of Comminges thus began scheming to engineer the betrayal of Toulouse to his control. He still enjoyed many allies within the city. Once in charge he would purge the parlement of Toulouse of its unreliable members, and seize the duc de Joyeuse.

By this time the estates of Comminges had recognised the royalist cause, though the ligueurs still held Muret (where the marquis de Villars had a garrison).

The cause of the ligue, to which Lanssac and Comminges remained loyal for the moment, was becoming increasingly desperate. The bishop of Comminges now found himself under direct risk and proposed to Philip fleeing from his bishopric and installing an Italian cardinale (cardinal) in the see. In return for a sum of money he informed the Spanish king on 30 March that he would depart either to Italy or Spain. This melancholy passed and he steeled himself to continue the fight. Meanwhile, the royalists began planning to use the Pyrénées to effect their own invasion (into Spain). Members of the royalist Aure-Larboust family arrived in the region and began installing garrisons and making preparations. The ligueurs believed that a royalist invasion would strike forth in May.

Lanssac and the bishop of Comminges became increasingly impatient for the arrival of a Spanish force to support them as the situation became blacker. Both men were ready to attack Saint-Bertrand, Saint-Béat and other locations on the Franco-Spanish border. For the Comminges force: 1000 arquebusiers and 200 horseman had been raised. This gathering force was approached by the royalist commanders the seigneur de Larboust, the seigneur de Clermont and the seigneur de Caupène who (according to the contemporary letter of Guillaume Bayle on 7 April) mocked the ligueur force as insufficient to stop Henry IV. The account continues that Lanssac bid the royalist soldiers depart, which they subsequently did without fighting the force of Comminges. After fourteen days of this army being raised, permission was given for it to go to ground, and going forward it would rarely be lined up in ranks. Lanssac and the bishop of Comminges remained disinclined to coordinate their force with the marquis de Villars. Nevertheless, both men remained confident that if Philip would just provide 6,000 arquebusiers and 200 horseman, Gascogne could be seized from the royalists. At Bordeaux they would unite with a sea based Spanish army, and the whole feat could be accomplished for less than 100,000 écus. An alternative that the bishop of Comminges dreamed of was for the declaration of a crusade in favour of their cause.

On 22 March 1594, Henri achieved a major coup when he successfully secured ligueur held Paris without the need for a siege. At this critical juncture the ligueur loyalist cities, among them Toulouse were urged to await a decision from the Pope before acting. During April, the king ordered Lanssac to see to the return of Calais and Boulogne to royalist control within three months under threat of being imprisoned or beheaded. This was despite the fact Lanssac in theory enjoyed little influence over the distant settlements. In practice however, they possessed family ties to the ligueurs in charge (the abbot of Licques in Boulogne and the seigneur de Vidaussan in Calais). Due to 'negligence' Vidaussan would in fact see Calais fall to the Spanish on 24 April 1596.

In addition to their familial allies in Picardy, even at this late hour Lanssac and his half-brother maintained supporters. This included the abbot of Pessan, Ramada the governor of Benasque and several captains of note. The bishop of Comminges oversaw the flight out of the country of the seigneur de Touilles. In a letter of 12 April he declared himself to be a Cassandra. The two brothers continued in their loyalty to the ligueur cause.

=== Defection ===
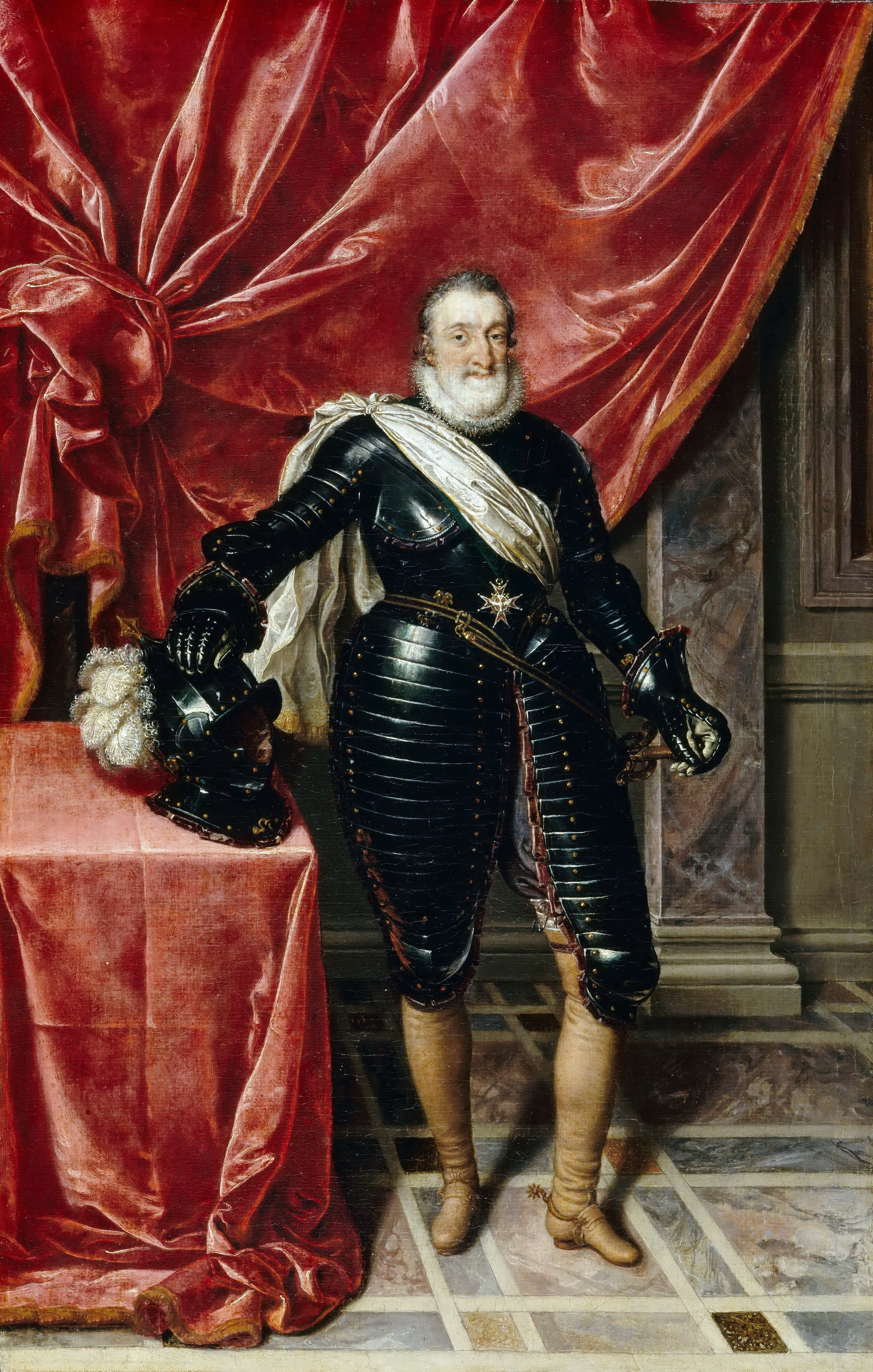
Henry IV, king of France with whom Lanssac reconciled himself

In July the town of Saint-Gaudens was put to siege by the royalists under the command of the seigneur de Caupène, the seigneur de Larboust, his nephew Corbeyran and the seigneur de Montbartier. They were supported by a force formerly loyal to the Campanère ligue totalling above 8,000 men. The people rose up against Villars and the town was delivered to the royalists on 13 July. The people, eager for peace, wished to push on to Saint-Bertrand-de-Comminges and seize the bishop of Comminges.

Though the bishop had raised a new force, facing the prospect of a siege, he and Lanssac had hurriedly drew up letters of submission to Henry IV on 20 June at Alan. Brunet describes this submission as a 'pretence'. In his submission the bishop of Comminges put Henri at the end of a line of kings from David through to Theodosius and declared himself his servant. Lanssac took a different tack, meekly begging for the king's forgiveness and clemency. He stated that he had erred from his true duty to show obedience to his king. He announced that he would lay down his life in service to the crown and prostrate himself at Henri's feet. He further made the unusual argument that the greater the crime of the disobedient subject, the more a testament to the king's magnanimity and clemency it would be to pardon him.

Lanssac and his brother continued to plot against Henry IV in the days after their compelled submission, alongside Villars, the marquis de Montpezat (brother of Villars), and Lussan (the former governor of Blaye who had been in charge at Saint-Gauban) . To this end Lussan continued to stockpile food and weapons in Saint-Bertrand. The prime Spanish ambition through the Comminges axis at this point was no longer directed towards Bordeaux or Brittany but rather preserving Toulouse for the ligue. In August the Saint-Gelais brothers were still in the pay of the Spanish crown, both Lanssac and the bishop receiving 300 ducats via Ramada the governor of Benasque, while Joyeuse was provided 10,000 écus and Villars 5,000 écus a month (through another conduit). While there were ambitions held by the bishop of Comminges for the Spanish king to provide 100,000 écus for a host of figures to allow for the raising of an army to conquer 10 to 12 cities around Toulouse, the amount Philip devoted to his agents in the region would not be increased, nor would the troops he had promised arrive.

The bishop of Comminges effected his genuine reconciliation with the French crown after the Pope granted absolution to Henri, something Pope Clement VIII only granted on 30 August 1595.

=== Outcast ===
The bishop of Comminges, who remained in control of his bishopric after his reconciliation with the royalist party, provided financial support to his brother Lanssac. Lanssac had been excluded from the royal pardon.

Though a repentant ligueur, Lanssac would remain in contact with the diehard ligueur Gérard de Raffis who had chosen exile from France to become a servant of the Spanish crown.

In a further treatise written as an expression of his goodwill, likely produced around 1597, Lanssac proposed to Henri an invasion of Spain in alliance with the Ottoman Empire. He announced that the purpose of the text was to demonstrate his devotion to Henri, and to silence those who disparaged him. He explained that Philip was so focused on the war in the Netherlands that his Iberian lands were ill defended. After having bought the favour of the Ottomans for 50,000 écus a combined Ottoman-French fleet (the French ships having been purchased from the Venetians) would land between Barcelona and Valencia. This invasion would run up against no resistance due to the lack of troops in the region, and indeed would enjoy support from the Moriscos who would rise against Philip when they landed. A great French seigneur, perhaps the duc d'Épernon would then lead an army in to join with the landing force. By the time the campaign was done, Philip would happily trade his control of the places he held in Picardy and Brittany for the return of his lands in Spain. Lanssac for his part would put 90,000 écus forward for the proposal and devote his own and the lives of his sons to the project. Henri was unconvinced by these proposals.

Not having lost his appetite for treasonous activities, Lanssac continued to remain in contact with the Spanish kings in the latter years of his life, corresponding with Philip's two successors: Philip III and Philip IV under the pen name of Guy de Lusignan from whom the Saint-Gelais claimed descent. In his continued Spanish correspondences he proposed interventions on the French coast. These correspondences with Spain would continue until at least 1618 and in 1616 he was seeking gratuities from the Spanish ambassador.

In 1603 Henri granted him control of a new compagnie d'ordonnance, though he had lost control of it by 1608. In 1606 he made some form of proposal to Henri again for a war with Spain. He declared himself Henri's most devoted servant. Lanssac remained in a financially precarious state.

== Reign of Louis XIII ==
In 1613 king Louis XIII granted him the rights to timber felling proceeds of a value of 70,000 livres which allowed him to pay some of his creditors.

It is possible that in the final years of his life he resumed naval service fighting against the corsairs of the Barbary coast.

In 1615 at the time he drew up his will, he was still mired in debts. At this time he was staying in Paris, probably in an inn as he didn't possess any residence in the capital. The document showed his traditional Catholicism. He asked to be buried in the cemetery of the Innocents, the place where the poor were buried. Twelve livres were to be granted to twenty five poor sick people, gifts to his servants he had failed to pay and then followed a list of his creditors. The majority of his creditors were modest people, from which Le Roux draws the conclusion of his isolation from power in these final years. The only grandees mentioned were the maréchal de Souvré (governor of the dauphin) and the seigneur de Lancre a conseiller in the Bordeaux parlement. His only surviving son Artus was declared to be his universal heir.

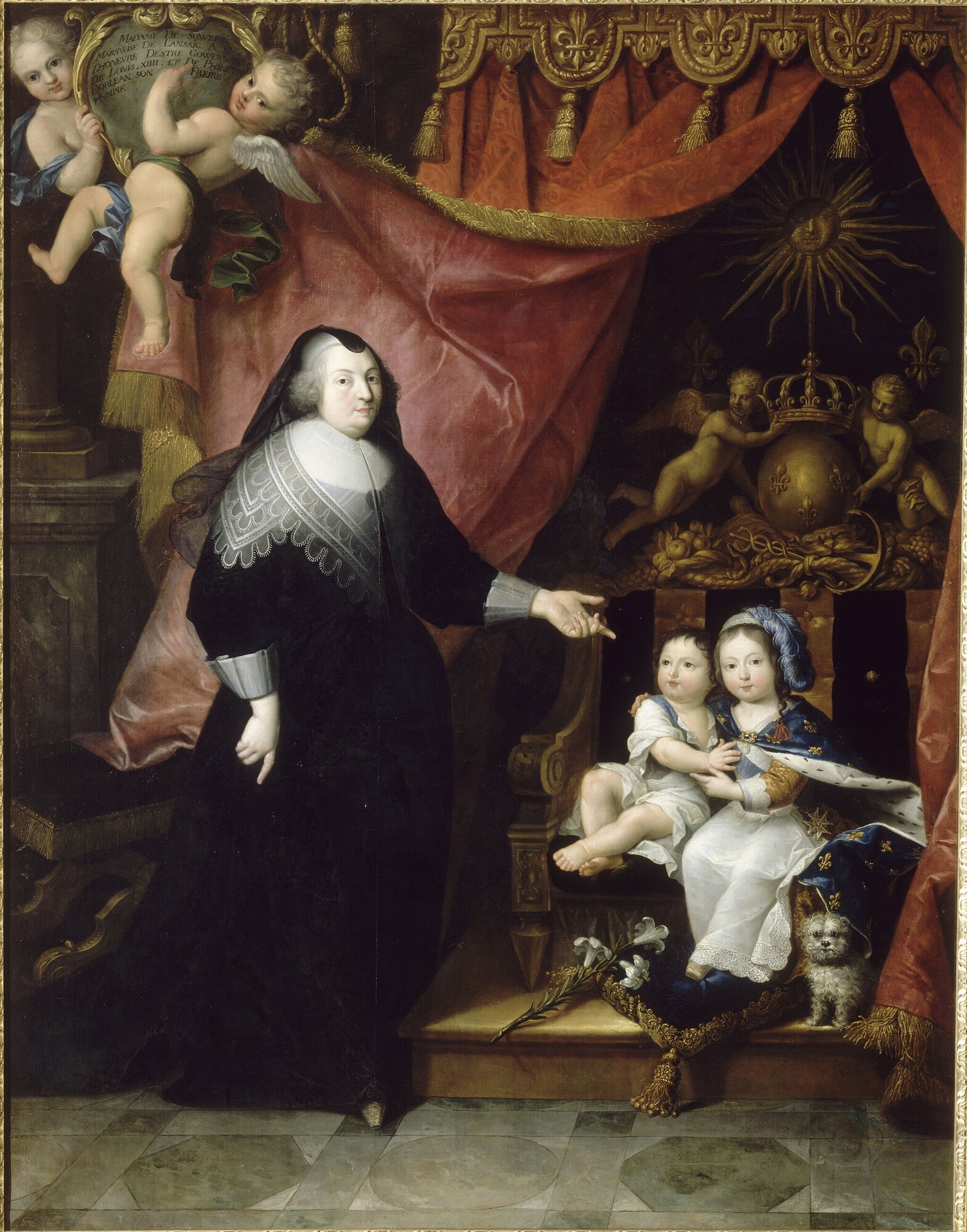
Françoise de Souvré, wife to Artus de Saint-Gelais and governess to the dauphin Louis XIV

Lanssac died a little while after August 1622 at the age of 78. He had ruined his family through his devotion to the ligue. In the early 1630s his only surviving son Artus died, and the male line of Saint-Gelais became extinct in 1636 with the death of Artus' son Gilles. Artus' widow would enjoy a successful life at the court, serving as the governess to the dauphin, future Louis XIV.

== Legacy ==
Le Roux summarises Lanssac as a man who failed to fit into the king's plans and lost access to royal favour. Turning to alternative sources of patronage, he equally failed to make a significant impression on the Catholic ligue, never receiving notable ligueur office like the title of maréchal Mayenne bestowed on many of his contemporary ligueurs (including the comte de Brissac and Boisdauphin). His rallying to the royalist party came too late for him to benefit from any favour from Henry IV. He further describes Lanssac as a man always interested in great naval operations, but without the genuine crusading zeal that drove many of his contemporaries. Rather for Lanssac it was in service of 'political and military objectives'. These plans he made allowed him to demonstrate his 'aristocratic virtue'.

== Sources ==
- Boucher, Jacqueline (2012). Lettres de Henri III, Roi de France: Tome VII (21 Mars 1585-31 Décembre 1587). Société de l'Histoire de France.
- Boucher, Jacqueline (2023). Société et Mentalités autour de Henri III. Classiques Garnier.
- Brunet, Serge (2016a). "Introduction". In Brunet, Serge (ed.). La Sainte Union des Catholiques de France et la fin des Guerres de Religion (1585-1629).
- Brunet, Serge (2016b). "La Ligue Campanėre (Pyrénées Centrales) et la fin des Ligues Hispanophiles de Guyenne et de Languedoc (1585-1596)". In Brunet, Serge (ed.). La Sainte Union des Catholiques de France et la fin des Guerres de Religion (1585-1629).
- Brunet, Serge (2016c). "Une Religiosité Influencée par l'Espagne chez les Ligueurs puis Dévots: Position du Problème". In Brunet, Serge (ed.). La Sainte Union des Catholiques de France et la fin des Guerres de Religion (1585-1629).
- Carpi, Olivia (2012). Les Guerres de Religion (1559-1598): Un Conflit Franco-Français. Ellipses.
- Chevallier, Pierre (1985). Henri III: Roi Shakespearien. Fayard.
- Constant, Jean-Marie (1996). La Ligue. Fayard.
- Gellard, Matthieu (2014). Une Reine Épistolaire: Lettres et Pouvoir au Temps de Catherine de Médicis. Classiques Garnier.
- Jouanna, Arlette; Biloghi, Dominique; Le Thiec, Guy (1998). "Index des Noms de Personnes". In Jouanna, Arlette; Boucher, Jacqueline; Biloghi, Dominique; Le Thiec, Guy (eds.). Histoire et Dictionnaire des Guerres de Religion.
- Jouanna, Arlette (1998b). "Le Temps des Guerres de Religion en France (1559-1598)". In Jouanna, Arlette; Boucher, Jacqueline; Biloghi, Dominique; Le Thiec, Guy (eds.). Histoire et Dictionnaire des Guerres de Religion.
- Knecht, Robert (2010). The French Wars of Religion, 1559-1598. Routledge.
- Knecht, Robert (2016). Hero or Tyrant? Henry III, King of France, 1574-1589. Routledge.
- Le Person, Xavier (2002). «Practiques» et «practiqueurs»: la vie politique à la fin du règne de Henri III (1584-1589). Librairie Droz.
- Le Roux, Nicolas (2000). La Faveur du Roi: Mignons et Courtisans au Temps des Derniers Valois. Champ Vallon.
- Le Roux, Nicolas (2003). "Guerre Civile, Entreprises Maritimes et Identité Nobilaire: Les Imaginations de Guy de Lanssac (1544-1622)". Bibliothèque d'Humanisme et Renaissance. 65 (3).
- Le Roux, Nicolas (2006). Un Régicide au nom de Dieu: L'Assassinat d'Henri III. Gallimard.
- Le Roux, Nicolas (2009). "Un prince «obligé de droit divin»: Les engagements du duc de Mercœur sous le règne d'Henri III". In Buron, Emmanuel; Méniel, Bruno; Foa (eds.). Le Duc de Mercœur: Les Armes et les Lettres (1558-1602). Presses Universitaires de Rennes.
- Le Roux, Nicolas (2013). Le Roi, La Cour, L'État de La Renaissance à l'Absolutisme. Champ Vallon.
- Le Roux, Nicolas (2020). Portraits d'un Royaume: Henri III, la Noblesse et la Ligue. Passés Composés.
- Le Roux, Nicolas (2022). 1559-1629 Les Guerres de Religion. Gallimard.
- Le Roux, Nicolas (2023). "Conclusion". In Gellard, Matthieu; Haan, Bertrand; Foa, Jérémie (eds.). Servir le Prince en Temps de Guerre Civile: Dans L'Europe des XVIe et XVIIe Siècles. Presses Universitaires de Rennes.
- Lhoumeau, Charles Sauzé de (1940). Un Fils Naturel de François Ier: Louis de Saint-Gelais, baron de la Mothe-Saint-Héray. Société Française d'Imprimerie et de Librairie.
- Pernot, Michel (2013). Henri III: Le Roi Décrié. Éditions de Fallois.
- Ribera, Jean-Michel (2018). Diplomatie et Espionnage: Les Ambassadeurs du Roi de France auprès de Philippe II - Du Traité du Cateau-Cambrésis (1559) à la mort de Henri III (1589). Classiques Garnier.
- Solnon, Jean-François (2001). Henri III: un désir de majesté. Librarie Académique Perrin.
- Vray, Nicole (1997). La Guerre des Religions dans la France de l'Ouest: Poitou-Aunis-Saintonge 1534-1610. Geste Éditions.
