= Château de Bordères-Louron =

Ruined castle in Occitania, France

Coordinates: 42.87306°N 0.39522°E

The Château de Bordères-Louron is a ruined castle in the commune of Bordères-Louron in the Hautes-Pyrénées département of France.

== History ==
The castle was built in the third quarter of the 13th century. It belonged to the family of Roger d'Espagne (Roger of Spain) from the 14th century. In 1740, a fire destroyed much of the village and the castle. Remains of the castle's enceinte are still visible.

The castle ruins are privately owned.

== See also ==
- List of castles in France
