= Tour de Moulor =

Ruined tower in Loudervielle, France

Coordinates: 42.8097°N 0.4048°E

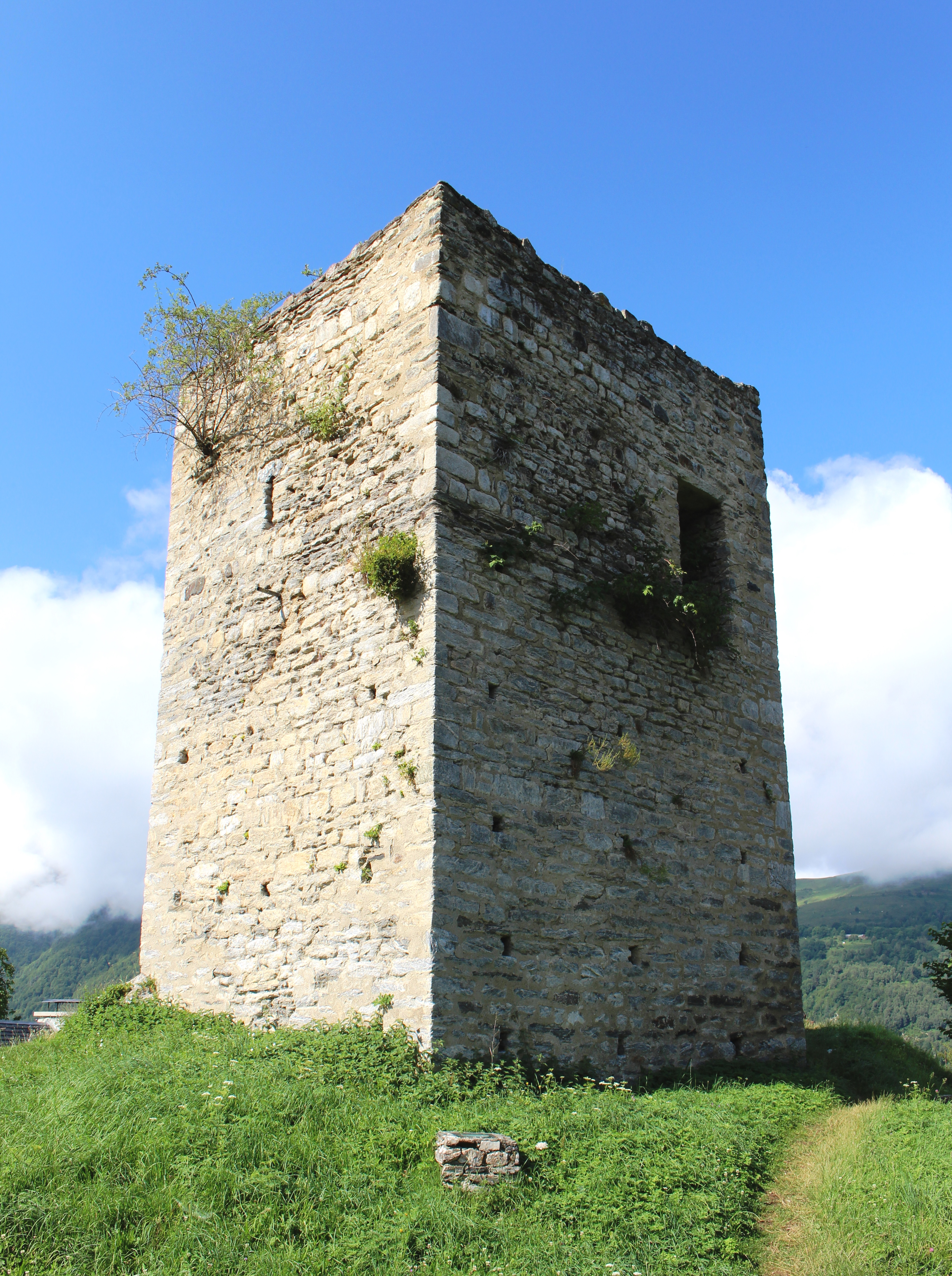

The Tour de Moulor or Château de Moulor is a ruined castle or watch tower in the commune of Loudervielle in the Hautes-Pyrénées département of France.

== History ==
The tower was built in the 13th century by an unknown builder, with alterations and additions in the 16th and 19th centuries. The tower stands on the summit of a peak of grey limestone, forming an irregular platform. A chapel on the site is dedicated to St Madeleine.

According to tradition, but impossible to believe, the castle was connected by a tunnel to the manor of Génos.

Both the keep and the chapel are documented in the 13th century as the property of the Lords of Montlaur, vassals of the barons of Espagne-Montespan. In 1540, Dominique de Montlaur gave homage for the castle, two houses and four barns. The last members of the family of the Lords of Montlaur to have lived in the castle died in 1753 and 1754.

The chapel was restored in 1995.

== See also ==
- List of castles in France
