= Valdelaume =

- Commune
- Location of Valdelaume
- Location within France Location within Nouvelle-Aquitaine
- Coordinates: 46°04′34″N 0°00′51″W
- Country: France
- Region: Nouvelle-Aquitaine
- Department: Deux-Sèvres
- Arrondissement: Niort
- Canton: Melle
- Intercommunality: Mellois-en-Poitou
- Area^{1}: 50.57 km^{2} (19.53 sq mi)
- Highest elevation: 166 m (545 ft)
- Lowest elevation: 88 m (289 ft)
- Population (2023): 818
  - Density: 16.2/km^{2} (41.9/sq mi)
- Time zone: UTC+01:00 (CET)
  - Summer (DST): UTC+02:00 (CEST)
- INSEE/Postal code: 79140 /79110
- ^{1} French Land Register data, which excludes lakes, ponds, glaciers > 1 km^{2} (0.386 sq mi or 247 acres) and river estuaries.

Valdelaume is a commune in the Deux-Sèvres department in western France. It was established on 1 January 2019 by merger of the former communes of Hanc (the seat), Ardilleux, Bouin and Pioussay.

== See also ==
- Communes of the Deux-Sèvres department
