= Hanc =

- Part of Valdelaume
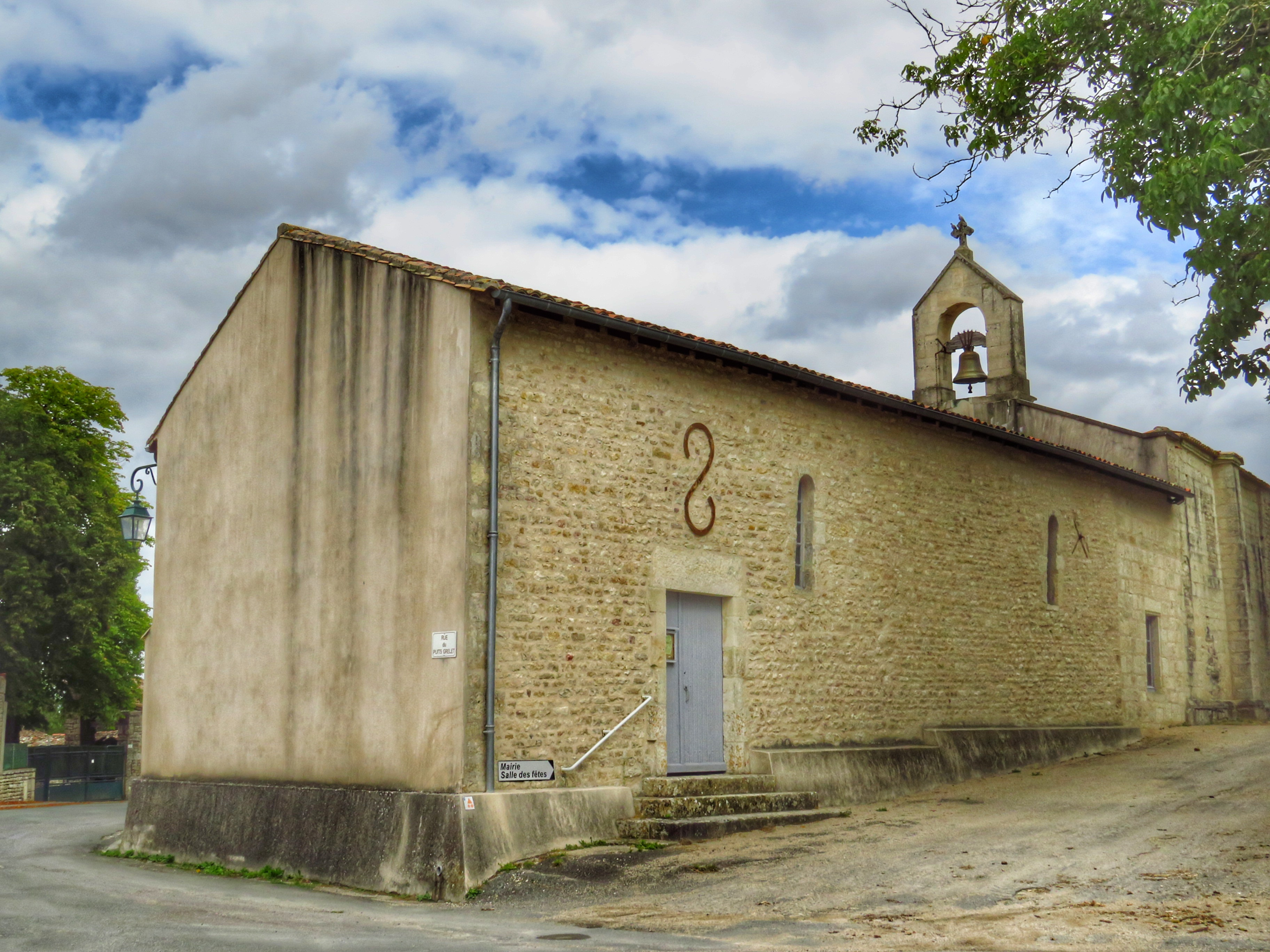
- Church of Saint Hilary
- Location of Hanc
- Location within France Location within Nouvelle-Aquitaine
- Coordinates: 46°04′34″N 0°00′51″W
- Country: France
- Region: Nouvelle-Aquitaine
- Department: Deux-Sèvres
- Arrondissement: Niort
- Canton: Melle
- Commune: Valdelaume
- Area^{1}: 18.12 km^{2} (7.00 sq mi)
- Elevation: 115 m (377 ft)
- Highest elevation: 165 m (541 ft)
- Lowest elevation: 88 m (289 ft)
- Population (2016): 258
  - Density: 14.2/km^{2} (36.9/sq mi)
- Time zone: UTC+01:00 (CET)
  - Summer (DST): UTC+02:00 (CEST)
- Postal code: 79110
- ^{1} French Land Register data, which excludes lakes, ponds, glaciers > 1 km^{2} (0.386 sq mi or 247 acres) and river estuaries.

Hanc is a village and former commune in the Deux-Sèvres department in western France. On 1 January 2019, it was merged into the new commune Valdelaume.

== See also ==
- Communes of the Deux-Sèvres department
