= Bouin, Deux-Sèvres =

Bouin
- Part of Valdelaume
- Location of Bouin
- Location within France Location within Nouvelle-Aquitaine
- Coordinates: 46°05′11″N 0°00′51″W
- Country: France
- Region: Nouvelle-Aquitaine
- Department: Deux-Sèvres
- Arrondissement: Niort
- Canton: Melle
- Commune: Valdelaume
- Area^{1}: 8.33 km^{2} (3.22 sq mi)
- Elevation: 120 m (390 ft)
- Highest elevation: 156 m (512 ft)
- Lowest elevation: 96 m (315 ft)
- Population (2016): 132
  - Density: 15.8/km^{2} (41.0/sq mi)
- Time zone: UTC+01:00 (CET)
  - Summer (DST): UTC+02:00 (CEST)
- Postal code: 79110
- ^{1} French Land Register data, which excludes lakes, ponds, glaciers > 1 km^{2} (0.386 sq mi or 247 acres) and river estuaries.

Bouin is a former commune in the Deux-Sèvres department in the Nouvelle-Aquitaine region in western France. On 1 January 2019, it was merged into the new commune Valdelaume.

== See also ==
- Communes of the Deux-Sèvres department
