= Ardilleux =

- Part of Valdelaume
- Location of Ardilleux
- Location within France Location within Nouvelle-Aquitaine
- Coordinates: 46°05′57″N 0°02′34″W
- Country: France
- Region: Nouvelle-Aquitaine
- Department: Deux-Sèvres
- Arrondissement: Niort
- Canton: Melle
- Commune: Valdelaume
- Area^{1}: 10.35 km^{2} (4.00 sq mi)
- Highest elevation: 139 m (456 ft)
- Lowest elevation: 89 m (292 ft)
- Population (2016): 179
  - Density: 17.3/km^{2} (44.8/sq mi)
- Time zone: UTC+01:00 (CET)
  - Summer (DST): UTC+02:00 (CEST)
- Postal code: 79110
- ^{1} French Land Register data, which excludes lakes, ponds, glaciers > 1 km^{2} (0.386 sq mi or 247 acres) and river estuaries.

Ardilleux is a former commune in the Deux-Sèvres department in the Nouvelle-Aquitaine region in western France. On 1 January 2019, it was merged into the new commune Valdelaume.

== See also ==
- Communes of the Deux-Sèvres department
