= Loudervielle =

- Commune
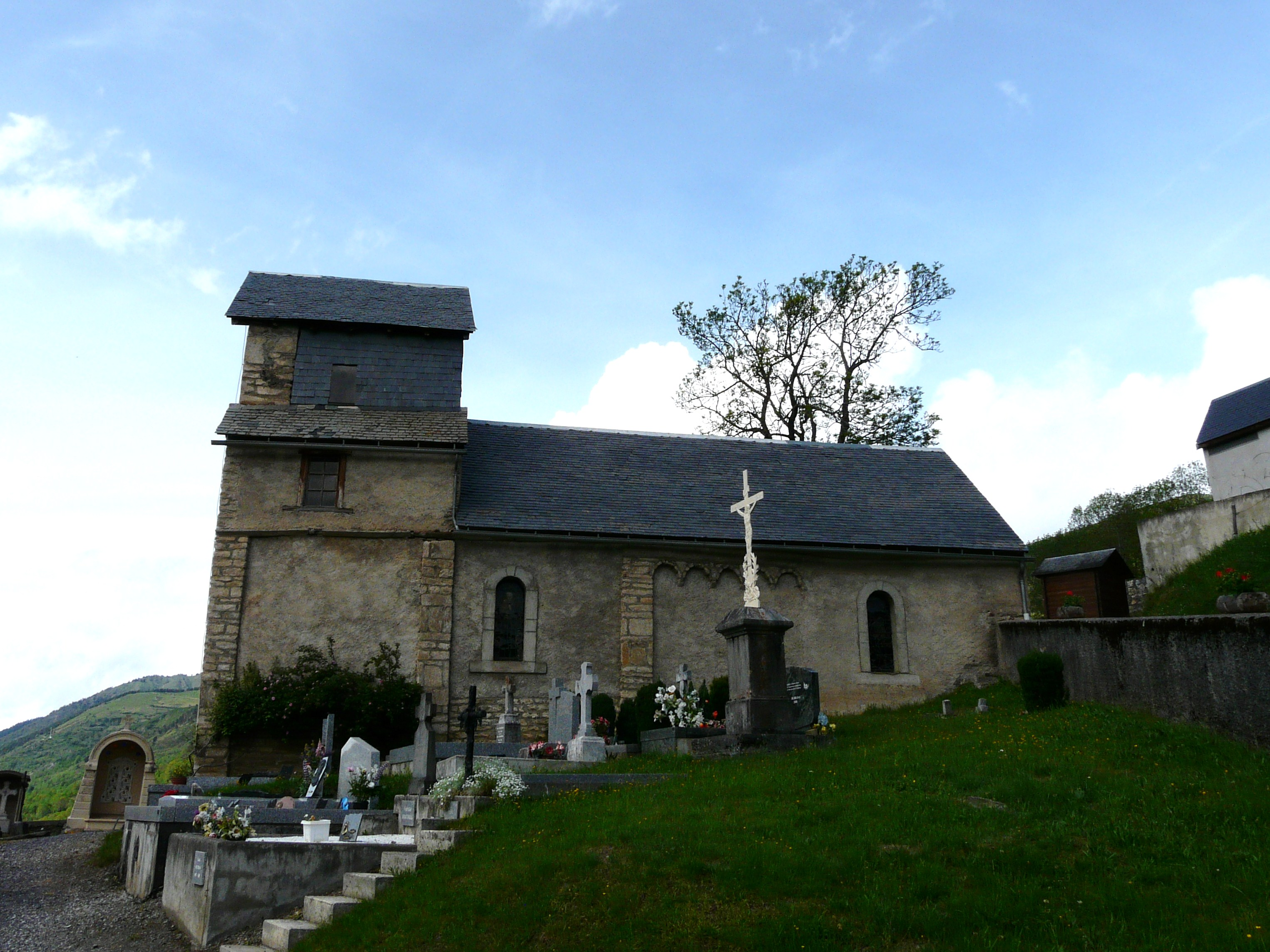
- The church of Sainte-Marie-Madeleine

- Coat of arms
- Location of Loudervielle
- Location within France Location within Occitanie
- Coordinates: 42°48′35″N 0°25′19″E
- Country: France
- Region: Occitania
- Department: Hautes-Pyrénées
- Arrondissement: Bagnères-de-Bigorre
- Canton: Neste, Aure et Louron

Government
  - Mayor (2020–2026): Évelyne Bertranuc
- Area^{1}: 5.39 km^{2} (2.08 sq mi)
- Elevation: 1,150 m (3,770 ft)
- Highest elevation: 2,034 m (6,673 ft)
- Lowest elevation: 1,038 m (3,406 ft)
- Population (2023): 49
  - Density: 9.1/km^{2} (24/sq mi)
- Time zone: UTC+01:00 (CET)
  - Summer (DST): UTC+02:00 (CEST)
- INSEE/Postal code: 65283 /65510
- ^{1} French Land Register data, which excludes lakes, ponds, glaciers > 1 km^{2} (0.386 sq mi or 247 acres) and river estuaries.

Loudervielle (French pronunciation: [ludɛʁvjɛl]; Occitan: Lodervièla) is a commune in the Hautes-Pyrénées department in south-western France.

Loudervielle sits in the Bigorre region, in the valley of the river Louron. The west side of the mountain pass Col de Peyresourde lies on the eastern edge of the commune.

The village's original Latin name, found in the church register of Comminges, was De Lodirvilla, and the name in Occitan is Lodervièla.

Coat of arms of Loudervielle

The village arms are described as azure, a lion or, a chief argent with three crescents of the field, the largest in the middle.

== Geography ==
=== Sights and monuments ===
- Church of Sainte-Marie-Madeleine
- 12th-century Tour de Moulor, the ruins of a medieval castle.

=== Climate ===
Loudervielle has an oceanic climate (Köppen climate classification Cfb). The average annual temperature in Loudervielle is 8.4 °C (47.1 °F). The average annual rainfall is 1,122.3 mm (44.19 in) with November as the wettest month. The temperatures are highest on average in July, at around 16.1 °C (61.0 °F), and lowest in February, at around 1.6 °C (34.9 °F). The highest temperature ever recorded in Loudervielle was 32.5 °C (90.5 °F) on 18 August 2012; the coldest temperature ever recorded was −17.1 °C (1.2 °F) on 1 March 2005.

Climate data for Loudervielle (altitude 1587m, 1991−2020 normals, extremes 2004−present)
Month	Jan	Feb	Mar	Apr	May	Jun	Jul	Aug	Sep	Oct	Nov	Dec	Year
Record high °C (°F)	20.3 (68.5)	18.9 (66.0)	19.6 (67.3)	22.7 (72.9)	28.3 (82.9)	32.4 (90.3)	31.7 (89.1)	32.5 (90.5)	28.6 (83.5)	23.3 (73.9)	21.4 (70.5)	19.7 (67.5)	32.5 (90.5)
Mean daily maximum °C (°F)	6.0 (42.8)	5.9 (42.6)	7.9 (46.2)	10.6 (51.1)	13.8 (56.8)	18.0 (64.4)	20.6 (69.1)	20.3 (68.5)	16.9 (62.4)	14.0 (57.2)	8.7 (47.7)	7.3 (45.1)	12.5 (54.5)
Daily mean °C (°F)	2.2 (36.0)	1.6 (34.9)	3.7 (38.7)	6.6 (43.9)	9.7 (49.5)	13.7 (56.7)	16.1 (61.0)	15.8 (60.4)	13.0 (55.4)	10.3 (50.5)	5.1 (41.2)	3.4 (38.1)	8.4 (47.1)
Mean daily minimum °C (°F)	−1.6 (29.1)	−2.7 (27.1)	−0.4 (31.3)	2.6 (36.7)	5.5 (41.9)	9.3 (48.7)	11.6 (52.9)	11.4 (52.5)	9.0 (48.2)	6.6 (43.9)	1.6 (34.9)	−0.5 (31.1)	4.4 (39.9)
Record low °C (°F)	−15.0 (5.0)	−16.3 (2.7)	−17.1 (1.2)	−9.4 (15.1)	−4.8 (23.4)	−0.4 (31.3)	3.0 (37.4)	3.1 (37.6)	−1.8 (28.8)	−7.0 (19.4)	−9.7 (14.5)	−13.5 (7.7)	−17.1 (1.2)
Average precipitation mm (inches)	94.0 (3.70)	84.9 (3.34)	86.3 (3.40)	117.4 (4.62)	121.7 (4.79)	105.2 (4.14)	84.2 (3.31)	72.8 (2.87)	76.7 (3.02)	87.0 (3.43)	122.4 (4.82)	69.7 (2.74)	1,122.3 (44.19)
Average precipitation days (≥ 1.0 mm)	10.9	10.1	11.8	13.9	12.6	12.5	10.4	10.1	9.4	9.4	11.6	9.7	132.5
Source: Météo-France

== See also ==
- Communes of the Hautes-Pyrénées department
