= Bordères-Louron =

- Commune
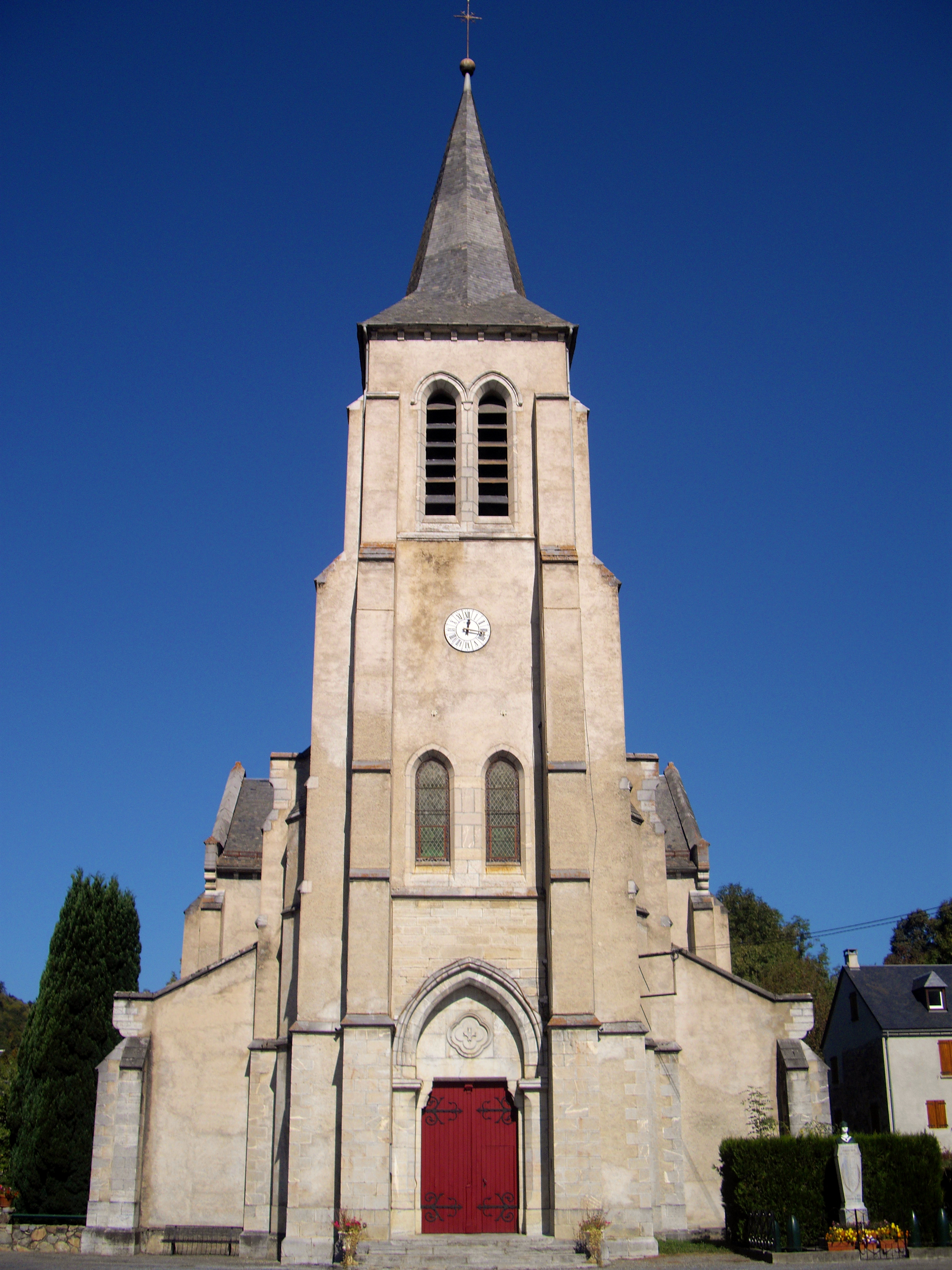
- Church our Lady of the Assumption

- Coat of arms
- Location of Bordères-Louron
- Location within France Location within Occitanie
- Coordinates: 42°52′21″N 0°23′46″E
- Country: France
- Region: Occitania
- Department: Hautes-Pyrénées
- Arrondissement: Bagnères-de-Bigorre
- Canton: Neste, Aure et Louron

Government
  - Mayor (2020–2026): Alain Marsalle
- Area^{1}: 17.41 km^{2} (6.72 sq mi)
- Elevation: 847 m (2,779 ft)
- Highest elevation: 2,173 m (7,129 ft)
- Lowest elevation: 810 m (2,660 ft)
- Population (2023): 152
  - Density: 8.73/km^{2} (22.6/sq mi)
- Time zone: UTC+01:00 (CET)
  - Summer (DST): UTC+02:00 (CEST)
- INSEE/Postal code: 65099 /65590
- ^{1} French Land Register data, which excludes lakes, ponds, glaciers > 1 km^{2} (0.386 sq mi or 247 acres) and river estuaries.

Bordères-Louron (French pronunciation: [bɔʁdɛʁ luʁɔ̃]; Occitan: Bordèras de Loron) is a commune in the Hautes-Pyrénées department in southwestern France. In January 1973 it absorbed the former commune Ilhan.

== Population ==
Historical population
Year	Pop.	±% p.a.
1968	145	—
1975	132	−1.33%
1982	132	+0.00%
1990	115	−1.71%
1999	148	+2.84%
2007	152	+0.33%
2012	168	+2.02%
2017	155	−1.60%
2023	152	−0.33%
Source: INSEE

== See also ==
- Communes of the Hautes-Pyrénées department
