= Jean de Vivonne =

16th Century French governor and diplomat

Jean de Vivonne seigneur de Saint-Gouard marquis de Pisani
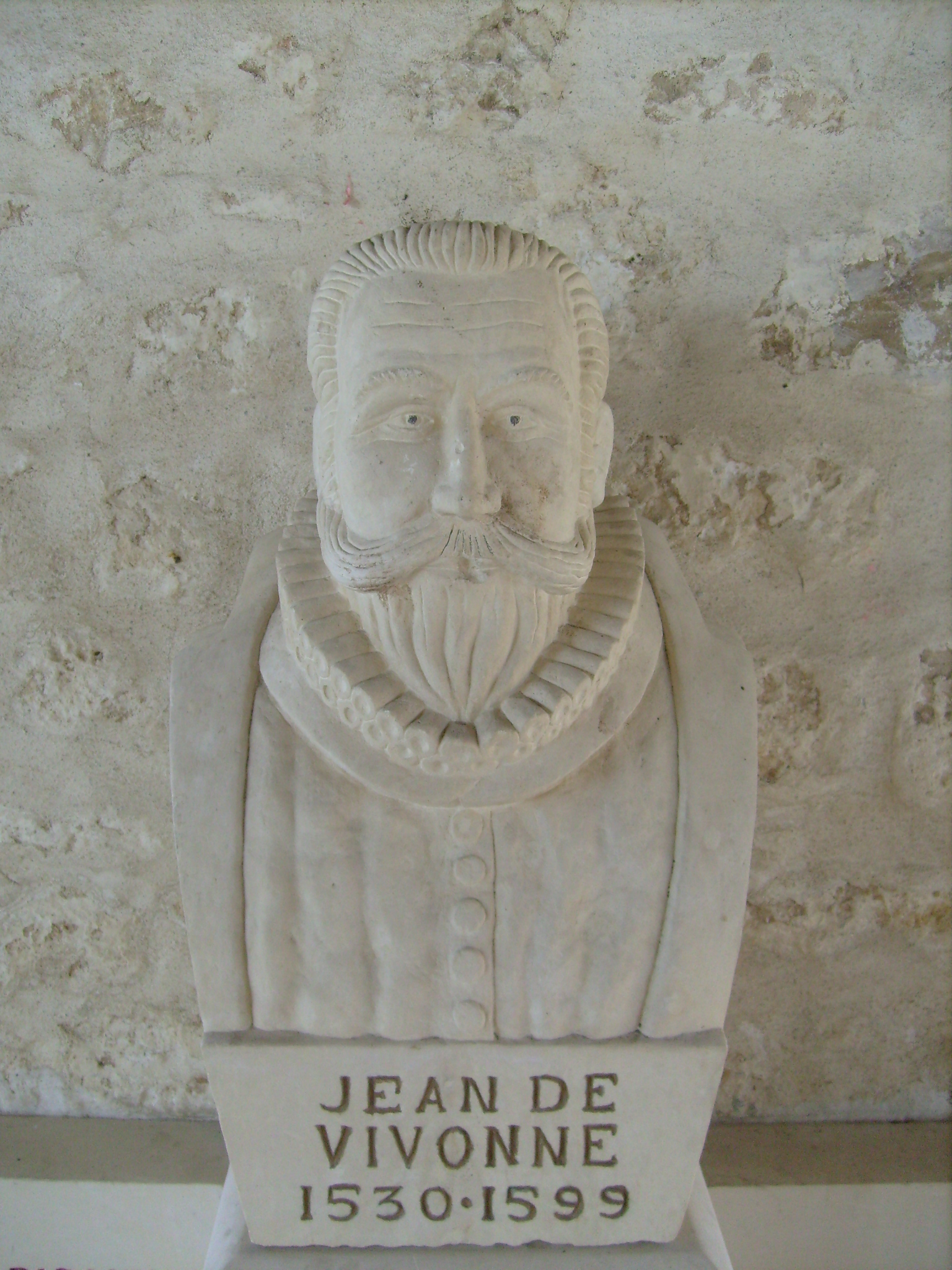
- Bust of the marquis de Pisani

11th French Ambassador to Spain

French Ambassador to Spain
- In office February 1572 – August 1582
- Preceded by: Baron de Fourquevaux
- Succeeded by: Sieur de Longlée

French Ambassador to the Papal States
- In office March 1585 – 25 July 1585
- Preceded by: Paul de Foix
- Succeeded by: Vacant

French Ambassador to the Papal States
- In office 19 August 1586 – 26 May 1589
- Preceded by: Vacant
- Succeeded by: Vacant

Personal details
- Born: c. 1530 Aunis
- Died: 7 October 1599 Saint-Maur
- Spouse: Julia Savelli
- Children: Catherine de Vivonne
- Parents: Artus de Vivonne (father); Catherine de Brémond (mother)

Jean de Vivonne, seigneur de Saint-Gouard and marquis de Pisani (c. 1530 – 7 October 1599) was a French soldier, governor, courtier and diplomat during the final years of the Italian Wars and throughout the French Wars of Religion. Starting his military service at the age of 15, he participated in the siege of Mariembourg in 1554 against the Imperial (Holy Roman) forces, and was briefly made captive. He then fought in several campaigns in Italy under the leading commanders of the day before the peace of 1559. In the first French War of Religion he fought at the climactic battle of Dreux. In the coming years he would participate in the major battles of Saint-Denis, Jarnac and Moncontour. In 1571 he received a break in his recognition when he gained stature through a mission he conducted to the Papal States that secured the release of a French subject condemned by the inquisition, succeeding through an audacious and aggressive style in intimidating the Pope.

The following year, Saint-Gouard was chosen to replace the long serving ambassador to Spain the baron de Fourquevaux. He was confronted immediately by several crises in relations between France and Spain, chief among them covert French involvement in the rebellion against Spanish rule in the Netherlands. Saint-Gouard fruitlessly tried to convince king Philip II of the innocence of the French crown in the affair. He faced much anger in Spain after the French candidate for the throne of the Polish–Lithuanian Commonwealth, the king's brother the duc d'Anjou bested the Spanish candidate. A little while later the French king died and was succeeded by the duc d'Anjou who took the name Henri III. On his return to France, Henri was confronted by a new civil war which would involve the rebellion of his brother the duc d'Alençon. Alençon dispatched an agent to the Spanish court to negotiate with Philip. Saint-Gouard tried to frustrate the agents negotiations, largely unsuccessfully. Efforts to convince Philip of French good intentions in the Spanish Netherlands would continue in the late 1570s, and would become more complex as Alençon increasingly involved himself in the territory. This would culminate in 1580 with the princes establishment as a replacement king for Philip in the rebel held territory. Saint-Gouard assured Philip Henri opposed Alençon's designs in the Netherlands. Relations between the two countries would be most seriously tested in the crisis of Portuguese succession after the death of the king without heir. Philip asserted his rights to the crown, and invaded Portugal, establishing himself in Lisbon. Saint-Gouard intrigued to frustrate Philip's hold on the kingdom without success. He met with the king in Lisbon and increasingly wore on the king and his advisers. This climaxed after the French crown sent an expedition to seize the Azores in 1582. That same year he was relieved of his responsibilities in Spain after ten years, ending his residency by trying to engineer the torching of the Spanish fleet in Lisbon.

Back in France, Saint-Gouard was rewarded with induction into the king's new most senior chivalric order and the post of governor of Saintonge in 1583. When the following year the ambassador to the Papal States, Paul de Foix died, Saint-Gouard was chosen to replace him. Arriving in the territory in March 1585 he enjoyed a combative relationship with the new pope, Sixtus V. This culminated in his expulsion from the Papal States after he vigorously supported his king's decision to refuse to receive the new Papal Nuncio. His return would be facilitated in 1586, and as a reward for his services, Henri erected the marquisate of Pisani in his favour. Over the following years he would defend his king against challenges to his Catholicity, and push the Pope to condemn the resurgent Catholic Ligue (League) which had re-emerged after the death of Alençon with Henri's heir now a Protestant, an unacceptable state of affairs to the members. The crisis between the French crown and the Catholic ligue would explode in December 1588 with the assassination of the duc de Guise, leader of the ligue and his brother the cardinal de Guise. The Pope was enraged that a cardinal had been murdered. Pisani and his ally the cardinal de Joyeuse would desperately try to stop the Pope employing radical action against Henri. However, after Henri entered into alliance with his Protestant heir, Sixtus issued a monitoire threatening to excommunicate Henri unless certain conditions were met. At this time Pisani withdrew from Roma. After the assassination of Henri III and succession of the king of Navarre as Henri IV, Pisani would be among the royalist Catholics who stood by the Protestant king. He received a final further honour in 1596 when he was made the governor of the heir to the French throne the prince de Condé. He died three years later, leaving his lands to his daughter, the celebrated marquise de Rambouillet.

== Early life and family ==
Jean de Vivonne was born around 1530 in Aunis, the son of Artus de Vivonne and Catherine de Brémond. His parents had married in 1519. His father Artus served the French crown during the Italian Wars, meanwhile his mother was in the entourage of the queen mother Louise. While Jean would have many siblings, only one had descendants, Marie de Vivonne. He came from the junior branch of an old family (recorded from the latter 11th century)^{β} established in the Saintonge and Angoumois.

=== Vivonne family ===
The family enjoyed many connections to great noble families such as the: Montmorency, Chabot, Rochechouart, La Rochefoucauld, Clisson, Saint-Gelais and Lusignan.

Jena de Vivonne, as a member of the noblesse seconde (upper crust of the provincial nobility) was an anchor of royal authority in Saintonge and a conduit between the crown and the local nobility. It was useful for the king to have men such as Jean to aid his control in a region far from his authority and racked by religious divisions during the civil wars.

In addition to his seigneurie of Saint-Gouard, and baronie, then marquisate of Pisany, Jean de Vivonne was also the sieur de Ramades, Foyes, Pessines, Les Comes and La Croix-Blance.

=== Marriage and issue ===
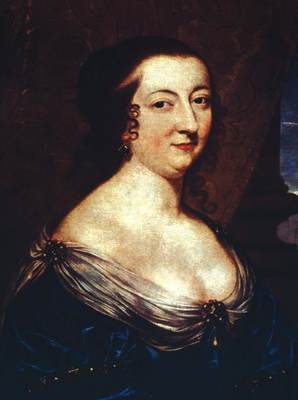
Jean's daughter the marquise de Rambouillet

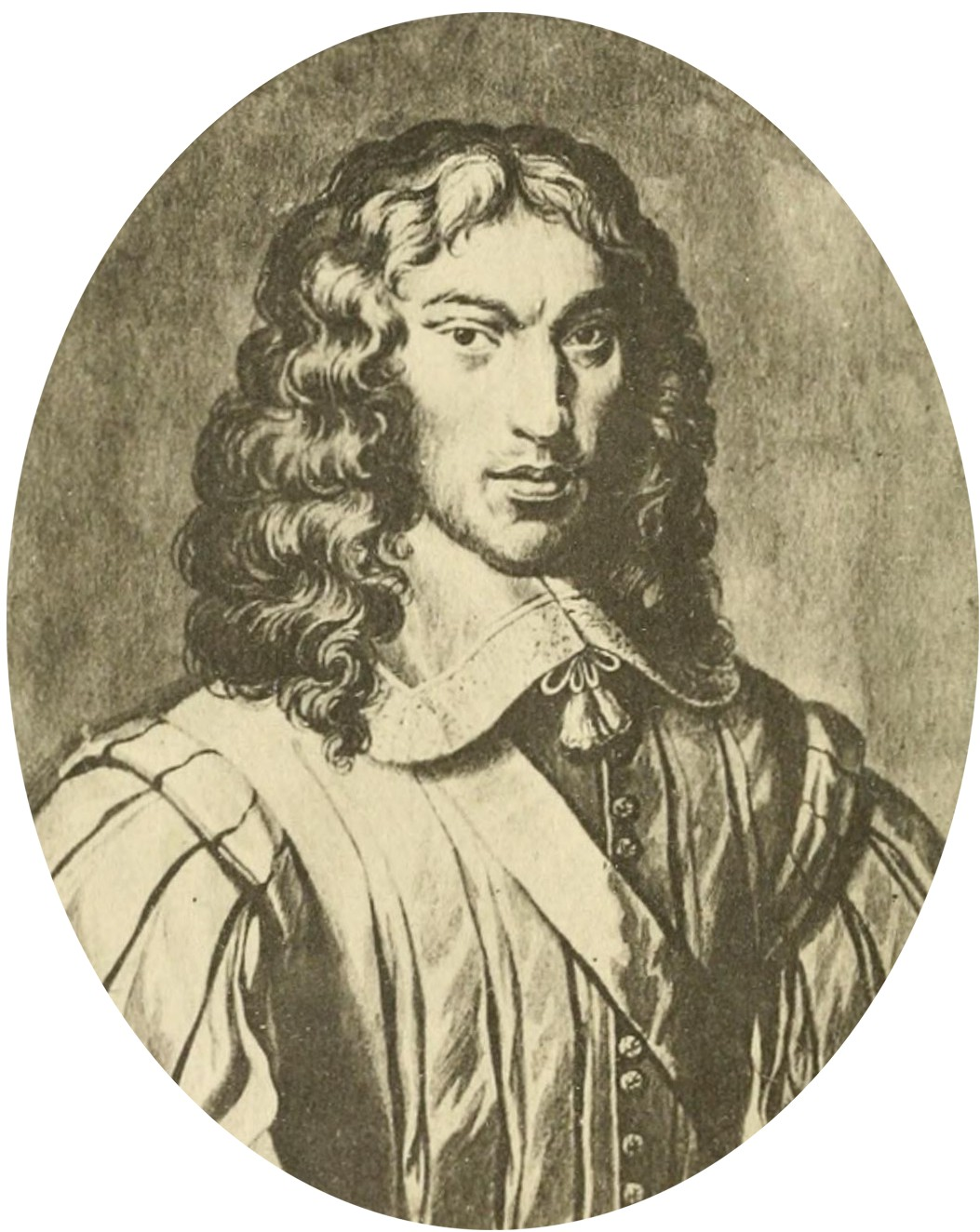
Marquis de Rambouillet husband to Jean's daughter Catherine

After his return to court in 1582 rumour swirled at court of his marriage to a fashionable woman of the court named mademoiselle de Vitry. However, Saint-Gouard was happy to remain simply a lover of hers. In 1587 he secured an excellent marriage (enabled by his recent establishment as the marquis de Pisani) to a young widow of a very noble Roman family named Julia Savelli, who had been married to Ludovico Orsini prior to his execution by the senate of Venice. The marriage contract between the two was signed on 22 September 1587, with the marriage itself celebrated in the church of Sant'Eustachio in Rome on 8 November.

Jean de Vivonne and Julia Savelli would have the following issue:

- Catherine de Vivonne, marquise de Rambouillet (1588–) married the vidame de La Mans in January 1600 and became famous through her salon for her influence on the intellectual life of high society.

His wife and daughter would join him in France during the final years of his life. Julia would be naturalised as French in 1593.

As concerns his youthful education little is known though he had a greater taste for being a 'valiant gentleman' than he did for reading. The historian Ribera highlights that he would have spent much of his youth participating in festivals and hunts. Saint-Gouard enjoyed the privilege of being an enfant d'honneur, meaning that he was raised alongside the royal princes. He first took a role in combat at the age of 15 in 1545 with responsibility for carrying an arquebus. A few years later when he reached 18 he participated in his first real campaign.

== Reign of Henri II ==
=== Latter Italian Wars ===
Saint-Gouard fought in the siege of Mariembourg during the French campaign of 1554–1555. He was to bring supplies to the fortification. In this campaign he was wounded and briefly experienced Imperial captivity.

He fought under the command of the maréchal (marshal) de Strozzi during the latter's campaign in Tuscany, then with the duc de Guise during his 1557 campaign into the peninsula. He was with Guise in Roma which he had come to at the call of Pope Paul IV so that he might campaign into Naples. This campaign made a great impression on Saint-Gouard. After this he was in Piedmont where he fought under the authority of maréchal de Brissac.

== Reign of Charles IX ==
After the French kings surrendered their claims to the Italian peninsula, the combat moved to the domestic sphere, as France's problems became internal.

=== First war of religion and the 'long peace' ===
During the first French War of Religion he participated in the only major field battle of the war at the royal victory of Dreux in December 1562.

With the Ottoman Empire putting Malta to siege in 1565, certain French seigneurs rushed to join the defence of the island bastion. In this they were responding to a call for aid from the grand master Valette. Among those joining the defenders on the walls were the sons of maréchal de Brissac, and maréchal de Strozzi, and Saint-Gouard. In total around 300 French gentleman and 800 soldiers would arrive at Malta. They would however, only arrive after the siege had ended. Nevertheless, the Ottoman government was greatly perturbed at this development, and Catherine sought to sooth their anger through condemning those nobles who had rushed to join the defence of Malta and banishing those who had made the journey. This punishment was however aimed at seeing them return to France.

=== Second and third war of religion ===
Saint-Gouard fought in the major engagement of the battle of Saint-Denis during the second French War of Religion. During this battle the Constable of France Montmorency was killed.

In the short peace between the second and third French civil wars, Saint-Gouard undertook his first diplomatic mission when he was made an extraordinary ambassador to the Spanish Netherlands.

Saint-Gouard was involved in all the major battles of the third French War of Religion. He fought at the royal victory of Jarnac in 1568 at which the Protestant prince de Condé was executed. At the royal victory of Moncontour in 1569 he was seriously injured.

Saint-Gouard was entrusted with the military responsibility of being capitaine de cinquante hommes d'armes des ordonnances du roi (captain of 50 men-at-arms in the royal ordinance company).

=== Out of the shadows ===
In the winter of 1571, at the age of 40, Saint-Gouard returned to diplomatic service when he undertook an extraordinary diplomatic mission to the Holy See for the purpose of securing the release from captivity of the comte de Caiazzo, a servant of the French crown who had been put before the Inquisition under suspicion of 'heresy'. Saint-Gouard approached Pope Pius V with haughty resolve on the matter. He reminded the Pope that Caiazzo as a French subject was within the jurisdiction of the king of France, and as such must be released. Pius responded that he was surprised to see Charles was so interested in the fate of a 'heretic'. Three days later Saint-Gouard returned and declared his patience to be at an end, if he were not sated within three days he would look to 'extreme measures'. With this deadline having come and gone he burst in on the Pope without having requested an audience to declare that he was leaving Roma, which he then did. After his departure Pius lost his temper at the behaviour of the ambassador, accusing him of drunkenness. Nevertheless, it seemed that a diplomatic rupture between Roma and France was imminent and there was fear to this effect in Roma. Thus Caiazzo was released. His success against the 'formidable' Pius V in this effort greatly elevated his profile, with Ribera describing the episode as 'bringing him out of the shadows'. To maintain face, Saint-Gouard was asked not to report his explosion with the Pope.

According to the English ambassador, when back in France, shortly before his departure to Spain, Saint-Gouard involved himself in a Catholic plot. Upon the arrival of the Protestant amiral de Coligny at court, Saint-Gouard was intending to surprise and destroy him. However this did not transpire.

=== Introduction to Spain ===
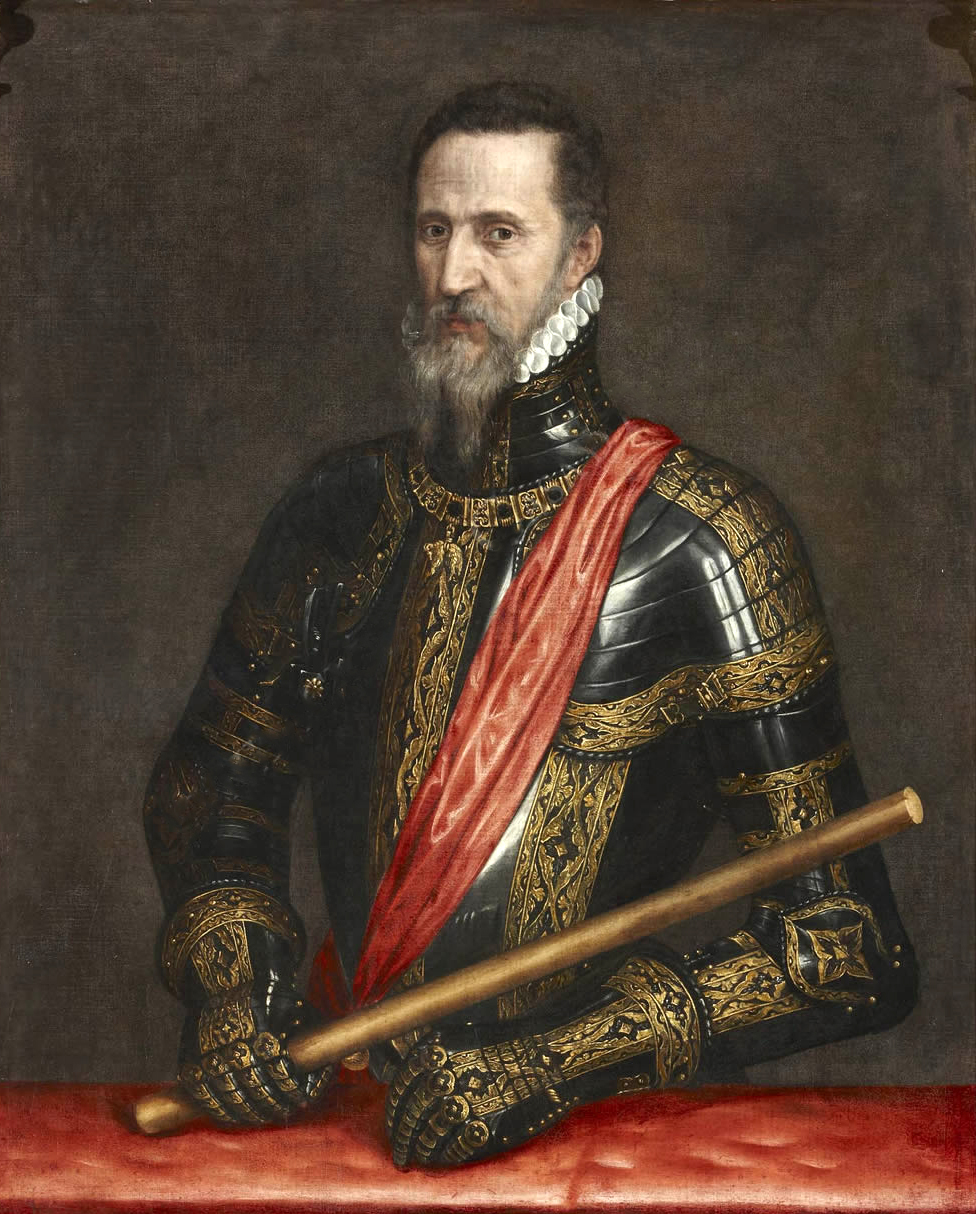
duke of Alba one of the principal ministers and commanders of Philip II's government

In early 1572 he was sent to Spain for the purpose of congratulating the Spanish king Philip II on the birth of his son Fernando. He arrived in the country on 23 February 1572. Philip received him four days later and he made a good impression on the monarch. He was presented to Philip by the current French ambassador to Spain, the baron de Fourquevaux and it was agreed that Saint-Gouard would succeed him in the difficult post. Saint-Gouard was provided with several specific instructions beyond the maintenance of peace and defence of French royal policy. He was to investigate Spanish preparations for war and angrily protest against the build up of forces by the duke of Alba on the French border in Vlaaderen.

Fourquevaux had advised the crown to select a 'man of experience' as his replacement, as after the death of the queen of Spain, Catherine's daughter, in 1568 the ambassador had been forced to operate alone in the defence of France. The crown thus turned to Saint-Gouard as a man of the appropriate temperament and military spirit to fill the charge. His credentials were issued by the court on 19 January. Fourquevaux expressed his great pleasure at the choice.

=== Ordinary ambassador ===
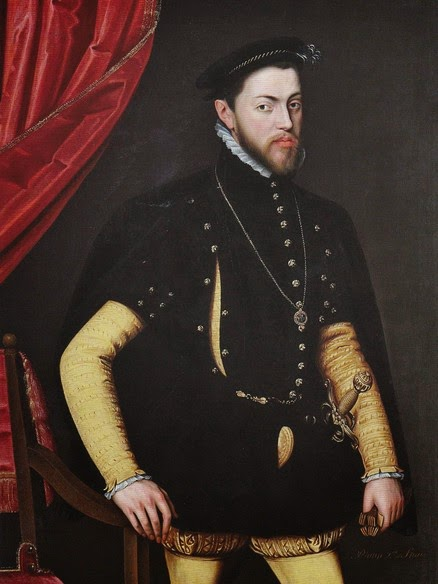
Philip II, the king of Spain

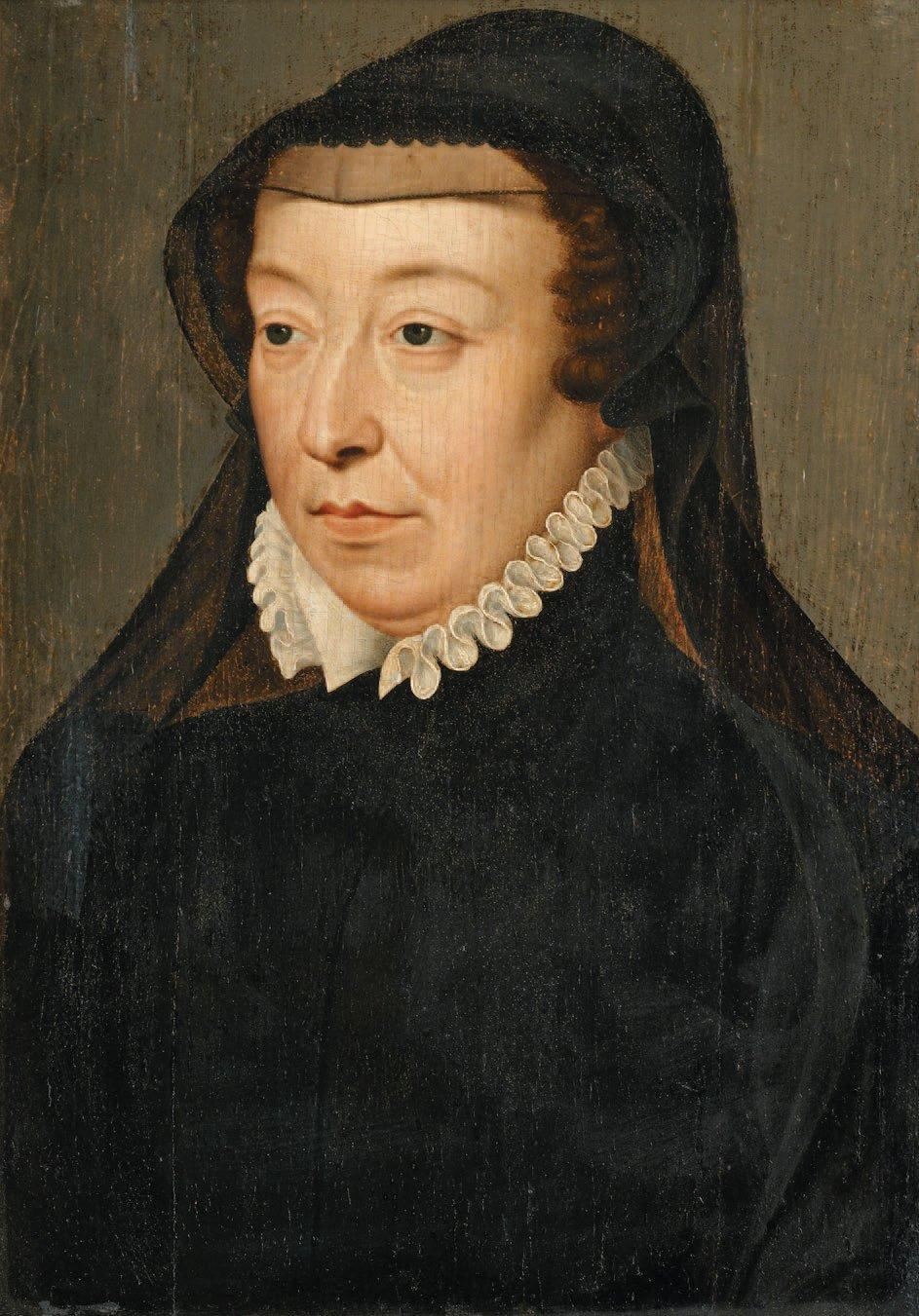
Queen Mother Catherine wife of Henri II, mother of three French kings and a frequent receiver of Saint-Gouard's despatches as ambassador to Spain and the Papacy

His residency of 10 1/2 years in Spain would be the fifth longest French diplomatic mission of his time, behind the ambassadorships of du Ferrier to Venice (11.5 years), Jean de Liverdis to the Swiss Grey League (14.5 years), Guillaume Ancel to the Holy Roman Empire (17.5 years) and Danzay to Denmark (21 years). As the latter decades of the sixteenth-century wore on ambassadorships trended towards longer and longer periods.

In this office Saint-Gouard would be a subject of correspondence for Catherine, the queen mother. In total 53 letters survive from Catherine to Saint-Gouard covering both his roles in Madrid, and in Roma, an average of one every 96 days. She would be a considerable correspondent for him in turn, receiving 85 of his letters. Only three letters from Catherine to Saint-Gouard survive for the period 1572–1580. Gellard argues from this that given the regularity of her correspondence we have for the 1560s, this likely reflects a low survival rate of the queen's communication with her ambassador as opposed to a ceasing of communication. Nevertheless, the historian notes it is quite possible the death of the queen of Spain, Catherine's daughter |Élisabeth in 1568 would have caused a decrease in the quantity of communication. Correspondence with the queen mother was official diplomatic correspondence, and would be conducted in tandem with the correspondence to the king. Letters from each, and to each often composed the diplomatic 'packet' that the ambassador received and sent out to the French court. Despite this, the historian Ribera sees Catherine's role as a diplomatic correspondent becoming more secondary during Saint-Gouard's tenure in Spain, with the letters to her become more sparse in detail, with the understanding king Henri III was to confide the more elaborate details to her. Gellard disagrees with Ribera as to the simplicity of the correspondence imparted to Catherine. In his capacity as ambassador, Saint-Gouard would be unflappable in his devotion to both the king (first Charles, and then Henri) and the queen mother Catherine.

In addition to his regular correspondence with the king and Catherine, Saint-Gouard would also exchange letters with the king's brother the duc d'Anjou (the future Henri III) in the early 1570s and with the sécretaire d'État (secretary of state) the seigneur de Villeroy the latter of whom was the recipient of 10% of his correspondence. During the reign of Henri III, Villeroy assumes the position of de facto minister of foreign affairs, hence his elevation as an important correspondent for Saint-Gouard. By the time of Saint-Gouard's successor Longlée's mission in Spain a quarter of diplomatic correspondence would be sent to Villeroy.

Around a half of Saint-Gouard's correspondence back to France would be encrypted. This represented an acceleration on prior practice which only furthered as the sixteenth-century wore on. The encrypted letters were primarily the ones sent to Henri, whilst those sent to Catherine and Villeroy were only ciphered in exceptional circumstances. In 1574 Saint-Gouard's entourage would be compromised by an agent of the Spanish kings who delivered all the ambassador's secrets to Philip. This is the only example of such an act of subterfuge in the period subject to Gellard's study (1559–1589).

Despite the security concerns he had, on occasion, Saint-Gouard would take advantage of the movement of Spanish diplomatic missions to provide his messages to Spanish couriers, thus he provided correspondence in November 1581 to the new Spanish ambassador to France to take with him to the French court.

As ambassador to Spain, Saint-Gouard was to enjoy an income of 18,000 livres annually. During his tenure in Spain, Saint-Gouard frequently complained that both his income and his expenses went unpaid by the French crown. Only six months into his residence he complained of his financial situation and asked to receive recall. It was too early for the French court to consider such a course of action. He renewed his campaign for relief in February 1574 explaining that he could not properly carry out his responsibilities due to his paucity of resources. It was explained to him by the court that he might receive reward on the death of the cardinale d'Este (cardinal d'Este). Saint-Gouard was shocked by this promise and abhorred the possibility that he might have to look forward to the cardinale's death. Instead he looked to receive an abbey that had become vacant, however it was granted to the maréchal de Biron instead. He complained to Charles of this 'disfavour' reminding the king of the services he had given to the crown. Over time his situation worsened and his apprehension towards his creditors in Spain bloomed. In periods of financial difficult he was embarrassed to show himself in front of the Spanish ministers, as he could not represent his rank properly. In 1580 he protested to Henri that he was completely ruined in terms of his finances to the point of no longer being able to endure his role as an ambassador. According to Saint-Gouard he was owed around 75,000 livres by the crown at the start of 1580. While in Portugal in January 1582, he wrote to Henri that his creditors in Madrid had lost their patience with him. The king endeavoured to provide him ecclesiastical benefices. In addition to financial complaints, Saint-Gouard complained in September 1580 that his ambassadorship was akin to a disgrace in which he was 'poor and miserable'. He opined that his 'disgrace' in 'exile' would feel less sore if it had been possible to experience it in France, as opposed to on the diplomatic stage where he was exposed and humiliated in front of everyone. In part the large number of complaints were a product of rhetoric, money did sometimes arrive from court and when it did not it could be supplemented with offices.

As ambassador he was subject to the hostility of Spanish public opinion towards France. This distaste for France was directed at him personally. For example, the corregidor of Madrid refused to provide food to Saint-Gouard's maître d'hôtel and insisted that if Saint-Gouard wished for it that he should collect it personally. Saint-Gouard complained to a Spanish secratario (secretary) of the humiliations inflicted on him by the corregidor and protested that he would have to inform Henri that rather than a man he had sent a slave as an ambassador. On occasion Saint-Gouard would be compelled to draw his sword on the street to defend himself. Spaniards came to jeer at him outside his residence. Beyond the hostility he personally experienced, Saint-Gouard observed broader anti-French hostility. For example, Saint-Gouard complained of the arrest of French people in Valencia despite them having been given letters of safe conduct by Philip. Despite paying money as a guarantee, they remained in prison without food or the ability to defend themselves. He made a new complaint on similar grounds to Philip in 1576 about the arrest of French merchants in Cartagena. He accused the Spanish of arresting ships crews solely because they were French, sequestering their property and leaving people in prison to die of brutal treatment.

Saint-Gouard found Philip a difficult man to read, opining to the duc d'Anjou in July 1572 that Philip was 'taciturn and inscrutable'. Both he and his court were well versed in keeping their opinion secret. By the end of his residency, Saint-Gouard found Philip to be 'tired and aged'. As for the Spanish ministers, Saint-Gouard held little appreciation for them, seeing them as hypocrites who were proud in their manners, and arrogant. Saint-Gouard viewed the Spanish as 'haughty and contemptuous', further adding that if he looked like them he would never appear in public.

In his dealings with Philip, Saint-Gouard adopted a far more combative attitude than his three predecessors as ambassador (Fourquevaux, Saint-Sulpice and the bishop of Limoges). He was little interested in contorting himself for the benefit of Philip's style. Philip thus preferred to negotiate with him through written memoranda that Saint-Gouard would submit to him. Saint-Gouard conceded to providing memoranda to the Spanish king on the condition he would still be able to meet with the king frequently. Not overly diplomatic in nature, Saint-Gouard participated in brawls and 'thrashed his enemies with his cane'. He informed the king of these episodes.

At the start of his residency, Saint-Gouard lodged himself in the house of Juan de Medrano. He was immediately put under Spanish surveillance. Ribera characterises his treatment as a de facto 'quarantine'. His greeting more generally was cold and reluctant, coming as it did during a period of French policy that was viewed disfavourably in Spain.

=== Crisis of 1572 ===
By now relations between France and Spain were beginning to transform from happy courtesies towards open combat. In the first year of his tenure he was faced with several crises in Franco-Spanish relations. Philip convinced the Pope to refuse dispensation for the royal marriage of the Protestant king of Navarre to the king's sister Marguerite, a key component of securing the longevity of the peace that brought the third war of religion to a close. In his eyes the marriage was an aberration in that it united the family of the Roi Très-chrétien (Most Christian King) with the Protestants. In April the Spanish secretary Gabriel de Zayas offered to aid the finding of a more suitable husband for Marguerite, Saint-Gouard proudly responded that in France, woman did not need help in finding their husbands. Meanwhile, French Protestants offered aid to rebels against Spanish authority in the Netherlands. The ambassador would propose the advancing of the timetable for the execution of several French subjects who had been captured in the territory. Further a fleet was assembled in La Rochelle that was suspected of being brought together for operations against Spanish colonial possessions. When Zayas brought him accusations from a spy that France was establishing a league against Spain and had armed 60 merchant ships to this effect, Saint-Gouard ridiculed him. The ambassador retorted the spy was misinformed, and it was in fact 4–5,000 merchant ships, and that Zayas' spy lacked any credibility. In April the French entered into a defensive agreement with the English, this was further proof to Philip that France intended to unite Europe against Spain. Through all this, Saint-Gouard had to keep the two kingdoms at peace with one another. In turbulent interviews with the Spanish royal secretary Zayas he claimed the French king Charles was not involved in any anti-Spanish actions.

Philip for his part, was not fooled by the protests of innocence of involvement the French offered and was well aware of French participation in the rebellion against Spanish rule in Netherlands. Nevertheless, he advised his ambassador that as long as the French maintained the façade of being uninvolved, they would pretend to believe the French crown. In July, the Spanish ambassador noted with concern that 10,000 were massed on the border with the Netherlands. Panic dominated Madrid, with rumours of French troop levies. Philip maintained his cool, arguing that if the French intrigues with the Dutch rebels were successful, they would throw down their mask and embrace the cause openly, while if it was a failure the 'double game' would continue. Saint-Gouard assured Philip that the king had adopted a new pro-Spanish policy that would please the Spanish king, but the situation on the ground continued to contradict him. Saint-Gouard was greatly embarrassed when word reached Spain of the defeat of the French force under the command of the sieur de Genlis which had invaded the Netherlands in the hopes of relieving the Spanish siege of Mons. Though the French crown denied involvement in Genlis' expedition, compromising papers were found which discussed future provisions to Genlis. On 19 July the duke of Alba provided papers on Genlis' person dated to April allegedly from the French king to the Dutch rebel leader van Nassau. Charles instructed Saint-Gouard to congratulate Philip on his victory. In a difficult position, Saint-Gouard first wrote to Philip explaining how the Protestants had gathered on the French border against the king's express order under the command of the 'madman' Genlis. Saint-Gouard then congratulated the Spanish king on providing suitable 'chastisement' to the rebel Protestants. In the audience with Philip, he again defended Charles' innocence. Philip abandoned his usual subdued demeanour, humiliating Saint-Gouard by asking him to recount the course of events several times on the pretext that his ambassador in Paris had written him a very jumbled account. He then announced it was time for Charles to see his real enemy at last, those who were against god. On 27 August Saint-Gouard reported to the Spanish king that Charles was going to carefully guard the border. This occasioned a sarcastic reply from Philip who warned of the troubles that resulted from unreliable border guards.

=== Calm in the storm ===
News of the St Bartholomew's Day massacre was greeted with delight by the Spanish king Philip II. At a time of great discredit with the Spanish crown, Saint-Gouard found the French now subject to enthusiasm and great sympathy in Spain. Receiving word on 7 September from one of his agents in France Philip went to a monastery to hear 'Te Deums' in celebration. Saint-Gouard received news of the massacre from the Spanish king, and made a good face of sharing his pleasure at the news. Unlike the French ambassador in Venice who reacted with horror at word of the massacres, Saint-Gouard expressed no shock. The ambassador was uninterested in discussing morality or justice, devoted instead to the matter of obedience to the crown. He assured the Spanish king he had no cause to distrust Charles and that this massacre had been planned for a long time, which Philip in his delight accepted. There were many strategic advantage to Spain from the massacres, with the elimination of amiral de Coligny the architect of French support for the rebels in the Netherlands. Further the event weakened Protestantism in France and offered the prospect of diplomatically isolating the rival kingdom from England and the Protestant German princes. Despite the Spanish pleasure at the unfolding of an anti-Protestant massacre, this could not entirely paper over the displeasure of the Spanish crown at the marriage of Navarre and Marguerite. It would only be on 12 September that Saint-Gouard received his instructions as related to the massacre. This slow delivery of the information to Saint-Gouard laid bare the disarray in the royal court. Word from the French court explained the course of events more precisely: the massacre was not premeditated but rather a by-product of the failed assassination of Admiral Coligny. The Spanish ambassador informed Philip that there was nothing pre-meditated about the massacre and it was ordered as a response to the Protestant threat. Saint-Gouard endeavoured to maintain the illusion of a crown that was in charge. He was unable to convince anyone that the massacres had been planned for a long time, with people sneering at him for the 'indecisive' policy of the French crown. The ambassador noted sadly to Charles that the Spanish wished to deprive the king of the glory he deserved. Charles likewise complained to Saint-Gouard that people were saying the policy had transpired 'by chance'.

Catherine wrote to Philip gratefully that she and her son had been able to fight off the Protestant conspiracy against them. Eager to seize the moment she proposed a marriage between the duc d'Anjou and Philip's daughter Isabel. Around this time, Anjou wrote to Saint-Gouard optimistic that the recent massacre might see the king properly obeyed by those who had 'deceitfully become his companions' who from now on would not seek to defy their kings wishes.

Saint-Gouard opined that the massacre had elevated French prestige in the eyes of the Spanish. This honeymoon was short-lived, and the people of Madrid quickly began questioning the French policy. Charles wrote to Saint-Gouard assuring him of his desire to maintain a friendship with the English queen. Saint-Gouard for his part enthusiastically championed a proposal for the Portuguese to conquer an empire in the Indies for France, seeing it as a method to counterbalance Spanish power. By now France was embroiled in a new civil war and had little ability to follow through on such a proposal.

=== Anjou's crown ===
The king's brother the duc d'Anjou was elected as king of the Polish–Lithuanian Commonwealth on 11 May 1573. To secure this position he had to compete with a Spanish backed candidate: the erzherzog von Österreich (archduke of Österreich). To support his candidate Philip had poured in around 600,000 écus (crowns) according to Saint-Gouard. Saint-Gouard received word of Anjou's victory on 8 June, but was disappointed to find that Philip was not in Madrid as he had wanted to taunt him. When he attained an audience with Philip later in the month the Spanish king declared himself greatly pleased to learn of the election of Anjou. Nevertheless, was thus much anger about the French victory in the election in Spain and rumours swirled in the country (fed by the Spanish ambassador in Paris) that the duc d'Anjou did not wish to assume the mantle of the Commonwealth's kingship, seeing the post as an 'exile'. Saint-Gouard was left to face off against this hostility and received word from Charles that Anjou had departed to take up his new charge in the hopes that this would combat the Spanish rumours. The ambassador proposed distributing notice of the election to impress upon the Spanish who he felt were full of presumption, that the whole world was not at their feet.

== Reign of Henri III ==
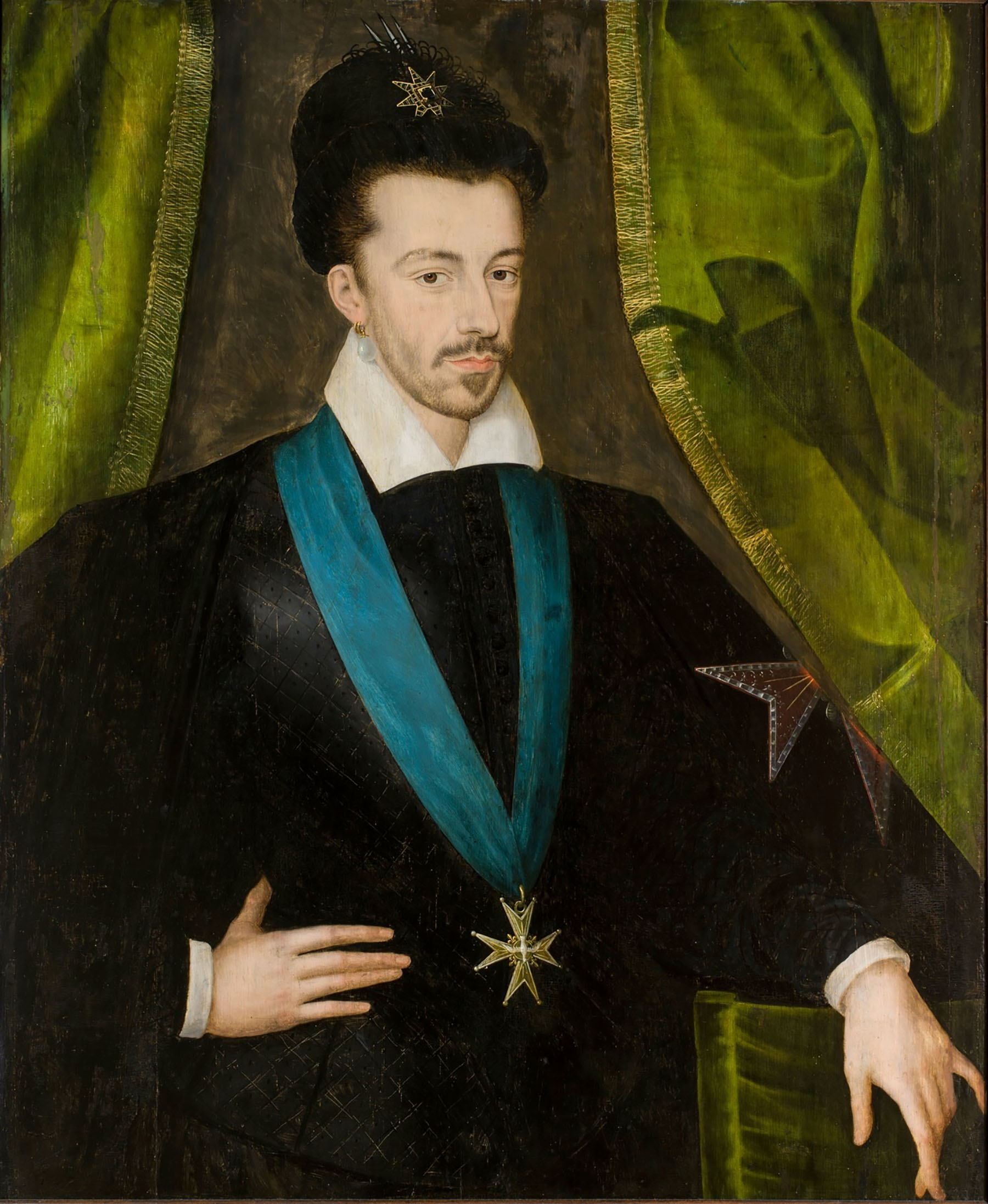
Duc d'Anjou who succeeded Charles as king Henri III

In the regency government of Catherine after the death of Charles and before Anjou (now Henri III) could return from the Commonwealth to France, Catherine became the sole conduit for diplomatic correspondence from Saint-Gouard. The period between the kingships was a delicate one for Saint-Gouard, as Henri made his way back through Italy to France. He faced off mocking jeers from those who noted Henri's leisurely return through Italy while his kingdom awaited him.

Several events threatened the embassy of Saint-Gouard in 1574. His stables were stormed by an angry crowd in December who shouted insults against France. During the invasion one of his grooms lost their leg. On another occasion also in December one of his men was attacked in the street. Saint-Gouard and a few servants rushed to his aid and a melee ensued. The following day the door of his ambassadorial residence was forced by an alcalde (mayor) and a group of soldiers who proceeded to arrest two young boys and a groom from his stable, taking them off to prison. Saint-Gouard dispatched his sécretaire to demand justice for this iniquity, but instead of attaining anything he was threatened with having more of his servants seized. Saint-Gouard thus appealed directly to Philip.

=== Jean David affair ===
In 1576 a Parisian lawyer named Jean David made his way back from Roma (possibly after a meeting with the Pope) in the retinue of the bishop of Paris. On route he died in Lyon, and papers were allegedly discovered on his person by the authorities that argued the descendants of Hugues Capet had been abandoned by god and had fallen into degeneracy (i.e. Henri III), while the descendants of Charlemagne (including the house of Lorraine-Guise) were flourishing in body and spirit. It followed that the duc de Guise wished to establish himself as king. The text spread around the capital but for the moment the king did not view it as a serious threat. According to the contempotary historian de Thou, Henri had received a copy of the treasonous text from his ambassador Saint-Gouard, who in turn had discovered it after it was sent by the Pope to Philip. Thus both the Papacy and the Spanish crown were implicated in the conspiracy. The authenticity of the text is disputed, with some arguing that it may have been manufactured to justify the 1588 assassination of the duc de Guise by arguing that he had been engaged in anti-Valois plans for over ten years. Philip for his part would have seen advantage in providing to Saint-Gouard a text which could cause factional instability in France.

=== Du Bourg affair ===
During the years 1576 and 1577, the king's brother the duc d'Alençon and the Protestant king of Navarre both undertook negotiations with Philip through the agent Claude du Bourg (brother of the Protestant martyr Anne du Bourg). Du Bourg first arrived in Spain in the final days of April 1576 in the covert services of Alençon. Du Bourg was to meet with Philip on Alençon's behalf. Saint-Gouard endeavoured to combat these negotiations. Alençon's representative arrived in Madrid on 20 May. Saint-Gouard needed to employ tact in how he handled the representative, as Alençon was the heir apparent to the throne and also presently in rebellion against Henri. To this end he decided to consider du Bourg to be an imposter so that he was not operating in direct opposition to the king's brother. He warned the secretary Zayas that du Bourg should not be received, but nevertheless Philip received him on 30 May. Du Bourg informed the Spanish king that Alençon wished to put himself at the service of Philip and prove himself by feats of arms. Philip suspected Alençon was seeking the hand of one of his daughters so that he might establish himself as the sovereign of the Netherlands. After waiting three weeks for a response from the Spanish king, du Bourg was provided a vague and unsatisfactory response from the king. During these weeks Saint-Gouard was working to discredit du Bourg, and passed Philip a letter from Henri to this effect which described the envoys mission as 'strange and impertinent'. Du Bourg was sent back to France with a gift of a gold chain worth around 400 écus. Philip opined to his ambassador that Saint-Gouard was furious that he had received du Bourg, but that his policy was not to displease anyone, especially as Alençon might be able to influence his brother in the future.

Having returned to France, du Bourg would be sent back to Spain by Alençon in August 1576 with a letter of introduction from the prince. Du Bourg made a bad impression in Catalonia with the viceroy of Catalonia. The Viceroy informed the Spanish court of his arrival on 2 September, causing embarrassment in Madrid. Philip feared a new trouble, and his secretary Zayas wrote to the viceroy of Catalonia urging him to maintain du Bourg in Barcelona, postulating that providing him wines might cease his progress. Saint-Gouard insisted that du Bourg not be received, and further than this, that his person be seized. Nevertheless, he was received on 21 September by Philip with Zayas assuring Saint-Gouard that he was sent by Alençon. Saint-Gouard violently disagreed, arguing du Bourg was an imposter and that if he could not prove this to have his own head cut off. Frustratedly, Saint-Gouard threatened to retire from the country back to France. After having once more provided an evasive answer to du Bourg, Philip asked the representative to hurry and leave the country. Du Bourg meanwhile complained to Zayas of the spies of Saint-Gouard who surrounded him to report on his every action. With pressure mounting for him to leave, du Bourg departed, after having offered his services to the Spanish king in the Levant.

Du Bourg appeared a third time in the peninsula on the behalf of the king of Navarre within six months of his last appearance. He expressed the king of Navarre's desire to lead a crusade against the 'Turk'. He further sought to negotiate a marriage between Navarre's sister, Catherine and the prince de Savoie. Du Bourg would not make it to Madrid, having been detained in Barcelona by the viceroy of Catalonia who wished him to communicate his letters. On 2 August 1577 he sent a memorandum to Philip in which he explained Navarre's situation and asked for a loan of 200,000 écus. Saint-Gouard was apoplectic when he learned of du Bourg's return to Spain and wrote to Philip to this effect on 19 August. Receiving a poor response from the Spanish king, du Bourg departed back to France without an audience. Saint-Gouard makes it clear to Philip that he would not wish for du Bourg to be allowed to return.

Simultaneously to these efforts, Saint-Gouard worked to reassure Philip that Alençon was not being supported by Henri in his ambitions against the Spanish held Netherlands. Saint-Gouard also sought to secure the marriage of a Spanish princess for the duc d'Alençon however in this he was unsuccessful.

=== Royal favour ===
In 1577 Saint-Gouard received the royal honour of induction as a chevalier (knight) into the Ordre de Saint-Michel (Order of Saint-Michel), the highest order of French chivalry. That same year he entered the king's household when he was made a gentilhomme de la chambre du roi (gentleman of the king's chamber), and also the royal government when he was made a conseiller (councillor) in the conseil privé (privy council), a charge he would hold until 1598, the year before his death.

After the seizure of French shipping in 1577 Saint-Gouard protested that the Spanish were so unjust in their behaviour that they made the 'Turks' look good by comparison. In January 1578 Saint-Gouard detailed to the Spanish secretary Zayas that the French prisoners were put in the hold without food and left to starve. After this the ambassador alleged they were subject to tortures and falsified confessions.

The French court sent the king's sécretaire Jules Gassot to Madrid as an extraordinary ambassador at the end of 1577, so that he might reassure Philip that the French supported the Spanish king in Flanders. Gassot was to propose the mediation of Catherine to resolve the disputes over Flanders.

This was followed from September to December in 1578 by another extraordinary diplomatic mission, this time led by the marquis de Maintenon to again reassure Philip about France's intentions as regarded Flanders.

=== Intrigues ===
A secret negotiation led by the seigneur de Lanssac was uncovered by Saint-Gouard in 1579. The purpose of Lanssac's efforts appeared to be the seizure of the city of Al Araish in northwest Africa. To uncover what was transpiring, Saint-Gouard entrusted his sécretaire to look into the matter. He had great success in his efforts and the Spanish ambassador in France was surprised to see how well appraised Saint-Gouard was of the affair, urging Philip to investigate who Saint-Gouard was in contact with as whoever it was appeared to be well informed.

Suspecting a man of Marseille named Reboul who was in Madrid of regularly selling information to the Spanish crown about Languedoc and Provence, Saint-Gouard attacked him in the street with his cane. The ambassador reported happily back to Henri in April 1580 that the beating he had inflicted had discredited Reboul in the eyes of the Spanish.

The ambassador had an issue with the interception of his mail during 1580, with the letters opened, read and then resealed. This was a problem for Saint-Gouard as he was engaging in intrigues with the Portuguese and discussing the intrigues in these letters. Fortunately for him, his cipher was not cracked. Nevertheless, he complained to the secretaries of Philip, Zayas and Idiáquez but was unable to convince them to care. He therefore escalated his complaints to Philip who referred him back to Idiáquez. With no satisfaction, Saint-Gouard complained to Villeroy, urging him to share in his anger.

=== Portuguese crisis ===
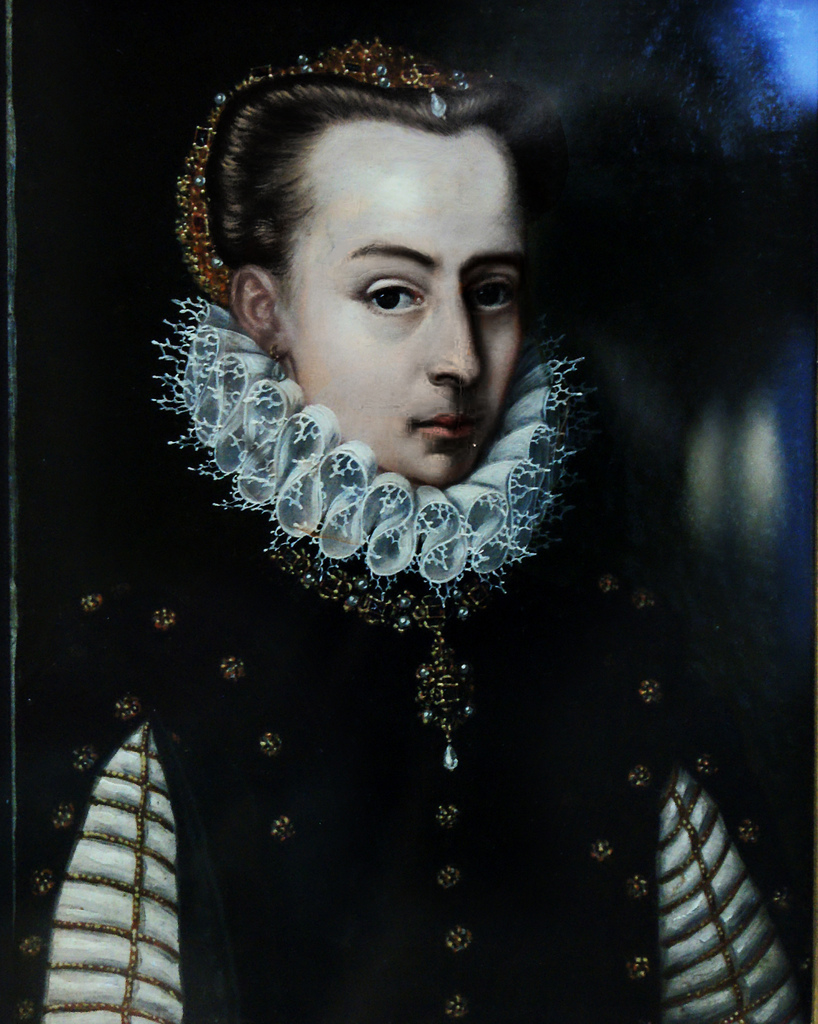
Duchess of Braganza one of the key power brokers in Portugal after the death without heir of king Henrique

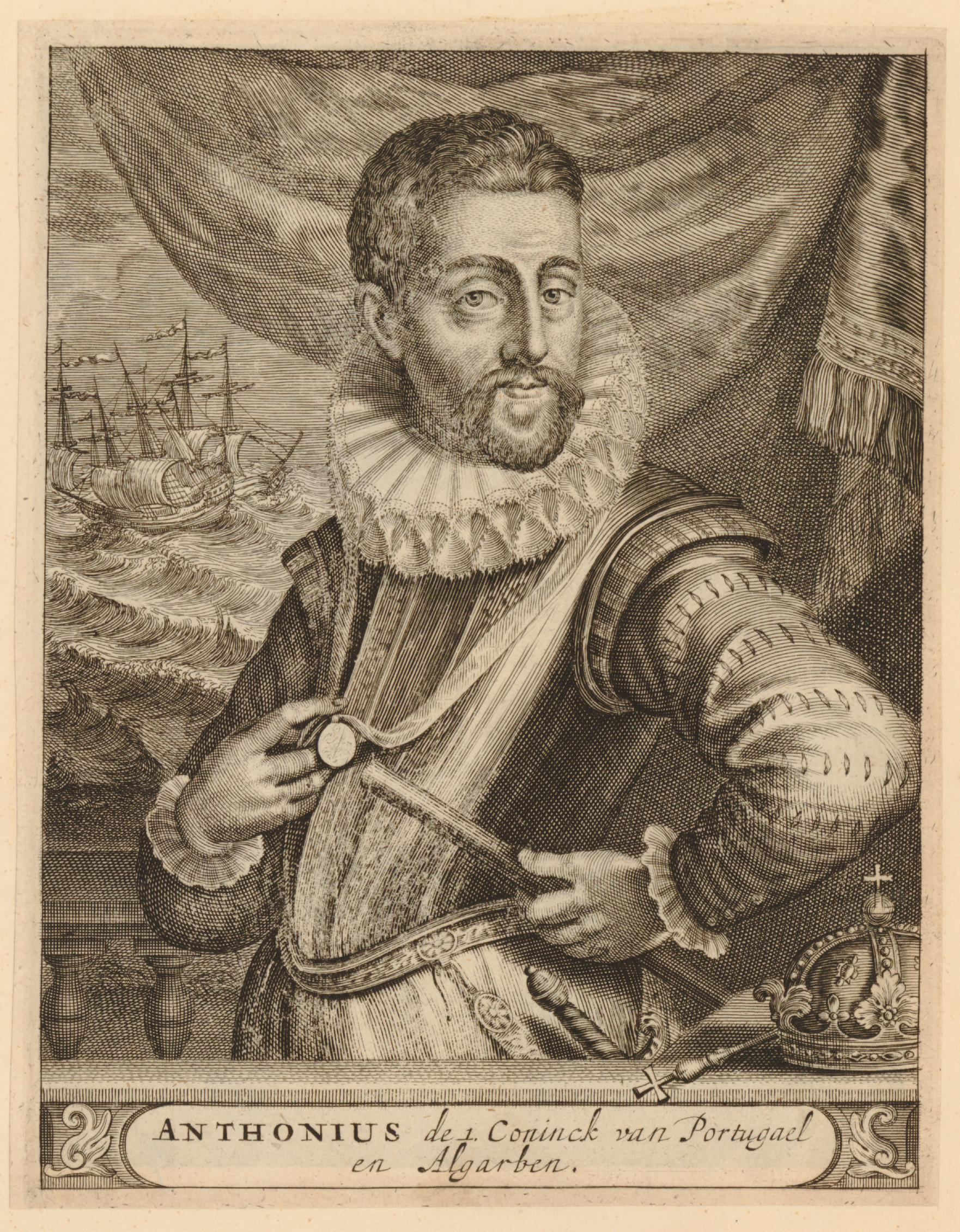
Dom António, claimant to the Portuguese throne

On 31 January 1580, the king of Portugal Henrique died without an heir. To solve the matter of his succession, he had established five governors to manage affairs on his death and appoint his successor. In the crisis that followed, Saint-Gouard did not believe that the claims of dom António to the throne had merit. Nevertheless, he observed that the people of Portugal were greatly hostile to a foreign candidate residing on their throne, and would prefer even a 'Turk' to submission to Spain. He received the pleas of Rodriguez de Castro, the cousin of the Portuguese duke of Braganza asking for French aid. Believing the Bragança family to enjoy great support in Portugal he therefore asked Henri to jump into action in March 1580. He proposed to the French king that the duchess of Braganza ally with dom António. In return for French aid, the kingdom would be rewarded with possession of the Portuguese territories of Madeira, Brasil and Guiné Portuguesa in addition to rights to trade with the East Indies. Saint-Gouard deluded himself into believing in the strength of the Bragança position and resolve. He was thus surprised to learn of the submission of the duchess of Braganza to Philip. After a final visit from Rodgriguez de Castro, Saint-Gouard conceded to seeking support for dom António in July 1580. The five governors who held the regency indicated to Philip that he should not think to bring his army across the border but wait until they had made their decision on who was to succeed Henrique. Philip could not however abide by their restrictions, seeing dom António's position consolidating (having been proclaimed king in Santarém he then entered Lisbon as king in June.)

Philip therefore raised levies across Spain to see Portugal subdued to him, with Saint-Gouard noting that the soil shook with the march of the soldiers. To lead the army the duke of Alba was brought out of retirement to command the force of 30,000 into Portugal. Alba enjoyed a fearsome reputation for his campaigns against rebels in the Spanish Netherlands. The troops invaded Portugal in July. Saint-Gouard hoped the people might be able to resist the Spanish armies. Philip's army was however able to subdue the country very rapidly, much to Saint-Gouard's surprise. Victory in battle on 25 August at Alcântara gave Alba possession of Lisbon on 2 September. The only frustration for the Spanish during the campaign was the successful flight of dom António who escaped from Portugal to France. This vexed Saint-Gouard who felt it would have been more productive had he remained in Portugal.

During 1580, the king's brother Alençon succeed in his negotiations with elements of the rebellion in the Netherlands for him to become their prince. An agreement to this effect was signed on 19 September. This was a difficult situation for Henri as if he directly opposed his brother he risked throwing France back into civil war, but at the same time he could not afford war with Spain. Saint-Gouard assured Philip that Henri was entirely opposed to Alençon's 'despicable' enterprise.

Philip entered Portugal on 5 December 1580 to receive the homage of the great nobility, in particular the duke of Braganza. Saint-Gouard sent forth spies to inform him of Philip's progress into Portugal and actions in the country. On 16 April 1581, Philip was proclaimed king of Portugal by the Cortes de Tomar de 1581. The prospect of Philip's aggrandisement over Portugal was a great concern not only to the French crown but also the English. He established a general pardon, excluding only dom António and his chief supporters. On 24 June Philip entered Lisbon. During this period Saint-Gouard was learning of the abuses the French in Portugal were experiencing.

In April 1581 Saint-Gouard voiced his dismissive opinion of the Spanish ambassador to France, characterising him as a 'little agent'. Back in France, the Spanish ambassador protested to Henri about the interception of his mail. Henri, who had the mail in his possession, only agreed to receive the ambassador after his cipher had been cracked. Receiving the ambassador, Henri postulated that his mail must have been stolen by Portuguese refugees in France. From here the affair escalated to such an extent that Saint-Gouard advised Henri in August to no longer allow the Spanish ambassador's despatches to be intercepted, as it left the impression in Spain that France could not control its population of Portuguese refugees.

The French ambassador was little interested in remaining in Madrid to discuss affairs with Philip's minister, the cardenal de Granvelle and was determined to jump on his horse and join with Philip in Lisbon. He undertook no interviews with Granvelle for a year, the gravity of the political situation required he meet with Philip. He was disheartened that the other ambassadors in Madrid were not dissatisfied by Philip's coup in Portugal.

In June Henri tasked Saint-Gouard with travelling to Belém near Lisbon where Philip was established to complain of the treatment of French merchants and people that had accompanied the occupation. Saint-Gouard was faced with the problem of determining how he was to finance the trip, and he speculated whether he might need to sell everything he possessed in Madrid and proceed on a couple of mules to Portugal. A month came and went without him able to depart. Around this time Henri informed Saint-Gouard he was to be relieved of his charge. As a result of this decision, it would be necessary for him to travel to Lisbon to inform Philip of this also.

Having arrived in Portugal in September, he learned he was to be without his diplomatic prerogatives. Granvelle had advised Philip to this effect, as Saint-Gouard reported indignantly in October. While established at the monastery of Belém near Lisbon, he refused the attempts of the secretary Idiáquez to establish tutelage over him by offering the ambassador accommodation in his house. Saint-Gouard saw this as a method by which to have his every action and visitor spied upon. When offered a galley by Idiáquez to take him to Lisbon he pretended not to see it and jumped into a small boat with a couple of servants. Idiáquez continued to signal to him but he ignored the efforts and made it to Lisbon by hugging the edge of the river where the waters were shallow. He established himself in a gambling den in the capital, all the better to keep appraised of the various intrigues. In Lisbon, Idiáquez renewed his request to accommodate Saint-Gouard one final time, deploring where Saint-Gouard has established himself and telling him it was the command of Philip that he stay with the secretary. The ambassador sarcastically remarked to Henri that he was surprised having conquered such a city as Lisbon that Philip had been unable to find independent accommodation for him. With relations between France and Spain further deteriorating, Saint-Gouard advised the French king see to the defence of the coasts of Provence and Languedoc. From his centre of operations Saint-Gouard fostered several connections with influential inhabitants of the city. While in Portugal he did not hesitate to appear insolent before Philip, and in his correspondence back to the French court, harshly critiqued Spanish policy.

He would remain in Portugal from August 1581 to January 1582 living in great poverty during his stay. The paucity of his resources would be such that he would be mocked by people as a 'simple valet'. During this period he had dismissed all his sécretaires for financial reasons, and therefore wrote his despatches himself, despite suffering from an eye disease. He apologised for the poor quality of his writing to Villeroy on the grounds of his eye health. While in Portugal he learned that his creditors in Madrid had seized his horses and wardrobe and were suing him. While ambassadorial communication back to France was typically conducted by horse, during his stay in Portugal he took advantage of ships travelling to Bordeaux to communicate more speedily. In case some trouble befell the communication by sea, Saint-Gouard informed the king he had a duplicate of the correspondence he had sent ready to go. He also on occasion utilised merchants who were travelling to France to bring letters to the kingdom, though the French employed this practice less frequently than their Spanish counterparts.

He wrote back to the French court in September that Philip was undertaking the fortification of Lisbon. As for the Portuguese, they were in Saint-Gouard's estimation 'dejected and submissive'.

From his rough accommodation, Saint-Gouard received Portuguese visitors who wished to re-establish the kingdoms independence. Ribera describes Saint-Gouard as working 'frantically' through this period in the employ of all his agents to frustrate Philip's ambitions to the crown of Portugal. He was disappointed to discover however that the Portuguese had lost the will to fight by and large, as such his efforts were largely in vain.

In his first audience with the king he explained why he had come to Lisbon without seeking Philip's permission. He then turned to the matter of the suffering of the French in Portugal. He summarised the damages in a memorandum to be submitted to Philip for the allocation of compensation. This accomplished he informed Philip that he would imminently be replaced as ambassador. He concluded by reminding the Spanish king that Portugal was dependent on Breton grain, and without it in 1581 the country would have been depopulated. In a new meeting with Philip on 9 October, Saint-Gouard conceded that Philip had the rights to the kingdom of Portugal, but observed that he had imposed himself on the land (and maintained himself) with the sword. This provocative statement was designed to upset Philip through challenging his legitimacy, but the Spanish king remained cordial during the interview. Nevertheless, Philip's contempt for Saint-Gouard further developed during this period.

In October, during an audience with Philip in Lisbon, Saint-Gouard assured the Spanish king that Henri was sincerely opposed to Alençon's Dutch enterprise, but had no way of containing the prince. He suggested it might be prudent for the Spanish king to offer one of his daughters to Alençon to calm his passions. He further informed Philip that Henri could not militarily confront his brother. Alençon was his heir in the absence of a child. That same month, Idiáquez reminded Saint-Gouard how patient Philip had been the French crown. Philip hoped that Henri would employ the appropriate remedies to the situation so that in future his subjects did not interfere with the public peace as rebels.

Idiáquez spoke with Saint-Gouard again in November. He informed the ambassador that Philip had sent a representative to the French court to resolve the situation of the treatment of the French in Portugal. This was an indirect way of explaining to Saint-Gouard he was not needed in Lisbon. The ambassador warned the secretary against ministers whose pride deluded them into believing the power of their prince was eternal. He competed with the Spanish over the nomination of a consul in Portugal to represent French interests, strongly representing Henri's choice (Melchior de Rieux) against the choices of the Spanish, who were favourable to their position. He was unable to get his choice of consul accepted.

After five months in Portugal, and with it being made clear to him that he was unwelcome, he resolved to return to Madrid. Funds were granted to him on route to the capital while he was in Sevilla by his sécretaire Longlée. This came as a great boon to him as he feared that he might even be imprisoned over his debts at this time. Saint-Gouard was little interested in waiting in Madrid for his successor to arrive, or alternatively for Philip to return. He thus undertook the sale of his furniture in Saintonge, which allowed him to finance a return to Portugal. He was even obligated to mortgage some of lands in Saintonge.

The Portuguese crisis had been a further catalyst for the deterioration of Franco-Spanish relations. At this time, a French military expedition to the Azores that was being organised under the command of the colonel-general Strozzi (son of the maréchal with whom Saint-Gouard had travelled to Malta in 1565) set sail. Propositioned by a prospective spy in April, he paid the man 700 écus for his services.

=== Second expedition to Lisbon ===
Saint-Gouard arrived back at Aldeia Galega near Lisbon in June. He wrote to Idiáquez to announce his return and asking the secretary to arrange accommodation for him. Instead of offering accommodation Idiáquez inquired coldly as to why he had returned. Saint-Gouard explained he had important matters to discuss with Philip. The Spanish king shared his secretary distaste at Saint-Gouard's return and asked why, at a time when Catherine was dispatching fleets against the Spanish, Saint-Gouard felt he had the right to 'cavort' among the people. He asked the ambassador to specify his mission and if they judged it to be truly serious, they would move from there. Saint-Gouard dispatched Longlée to secure accommodation for him, and the sécretaire succeeded in finding lodgings for him with a rich Genoese man. It was quickly apparent he was under close watch. Despite being under watch, Saint-Gouard continued to meet with those who opposed Spanish rule in Portugal.

On 21 June Saint-Gouard attained an audience with Philip. The ambassador assured the Spanish king that Henri desired peace between their kingdoms and regretted the actions of his brother in Flanders. He went as far as to propose a marriage between Alençon and one of the Spanish king's daughters might still be an appropriate solution. This was greeted coldly by Philip.

The following day, Idiáquez visited Saint-Gouard to inform him that it was absurd to seek a marriage between Alençon and one of Philip's daughters at a time when Alençon was seeking a marriage with the English queen, and France was sending an armed fleet out against Spain. Idiáquez then attacked Henri for the support he offered to the claims of dom António. Though the secretary stated this was the end of matters, Saint-Gouard retorted he had already explained everything to Philip. He further clarified Henri had only accepted António into France due to the pity he felt for him. The protections afforded the pretender to the throne were a product of the warnings Saint-Gouard had provided that there were many assassins who desired António dead. It would be a considerable dishonour to Henri for the Portuguese noble to be murdered in his territory.

Idiáquez returned to meet with Saint-Gouard for a final time a week later. Saint-Gouard was ordered to leave Lisbon and return to Madrid. On 10 July, shortly before he left Portugal he bore witness to the departure of the Spanish fleet that was going to crush Strozzi's expedition, led by the marquis of Santa Cruz.

=== Back in Madrid ===
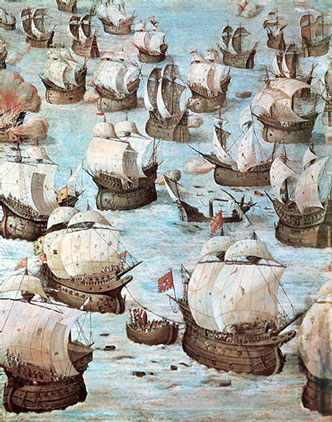
Spanish naval victory over the force under the French commander Strozzi at Vila Franca do Compo

That same month the French expeditionary force to the Azores under the command of Strozzi was destroyed by the Spanish. The captured French prisoners were considered to be pirates, and therefore all were killed. On 23 July 1582 Saint-Gouard held his final audience with Philip, it was cordial as decorum dictated despite the hatred Philip had for the ambassador. Saint Gouard then departed Lisbon on 26 July and made his way back to Madrid, arriving in the city on 17 August. Once there he observed bitterly that for weeks after the Spanish naval victory, bonfires were maintained in the capital. The ambassador complained to Catherine and Henri about the 'insolence' of the Spanish people. Having heard reports that Strozzi's force had not put up strong resistance but rather fled, the ambassador remarked bitterly that the soldiers should die of shame. In October he wrote that they spat at French people in the street.

His time as ambassador had so impoverished him that he worried about the image he would present on his return to France, having sold even his shirts to his creditors. The following month he reported to the crown of the arrival of a treasure fleet from the Spanish colonial territories weighed down with between three and four million écus. His successor as ambassador ^{α}, the sieur de Longlée was already in Iberia at the time of Saint-Gouard's relief. He had in fact served as a sécretaire to Saint-Gouard for the last nine years of his diplomatic mission, being first mentioned in this capacity in 1574 correspondence from Diego de Zúñiga to Philip . Saint-Gouard had richly praised Longlée in his writings to the French court, informing the crown that they had 'no greater servant' than he. Nevertheless, Saint-Gouard's combative style and willingness to anger Philip and overstep his prerogatives during his tenure left Longlée in a difficult position. The departing ambassador warned his successor to be careful about involving himself in matters without a strong supply of money. Longlée was well aware his financial resources were inferior to those his predecessor had enjoyed. In his final month in Spain (December), Saint-Gouard bribed some men to undertake the burning of the Spanish fleet that was anchored in Lisbon. He entrusted Longlée with overseeing the operation, however nothing would come of it. Alongside this mission, Saint-Gouard made sure his successor was well appraised of current affairs.

While the crown struggled with the prospect of seeing Saint-Gouard financially compensated for his long ambassadorship, it could reward him with office. In 1583 Henri established Saint-Gouard in the position of governor of the province of Saintonge, with particular responsibility for the château de Saintes, a charge that offered great prospects of profit. He would hold this charge until 1596. During the 31 December 1583 induction into his new most senior (and more exclusive) order of French chivalry, Saint-Gouard would be established as a chevalier of the Ordre du Saint-Esprit (Order of the Holy-Spirit).

Saint-Gouard's successor as ambassador, the sieur de Longlée had in his employ a Portuguese spy (named Rondela) who was compromised in 1584 and arrested by the Spanish authorities. Longlée feigned shock when links between the spy and himself were proposed, and suggested that perhaps Rondela may have known Saint-Gouard in Flanders or Constantinople and that there was nothing compromising about their relationship.

In June 1584, the king's brother Alençon died. As the king lacked a son the succession to the crown defaulted to his distant Protestant cousin the king of Navarre. This was seized upon as unacceptable by a segment of the Catholic nobility led by the duc de Guise who re-founded the Catholic Ligue (League) to oppose Navarre's succession and various other royal policies.

=== Papal mission ===
In 1584 Saint-Gouard was established as the French ambassador to the Papal States upon the death of the prior ambassador Paul de Foix. He would be the only sword noble of this period to hold multiple ordinary diplomatic postings, something that was more common for robe nobles. He would further be a deviation from the usual royal policy of sending a man of the church as ambassador to Roma. The French ambassadorial post to Roma was the most chaotic one, with several of the incumbents in the office dying during their postings while others were made cardinals. This caused numerous interims in the posting. There would be a considerable deal of time between the death of Foix and his arrival, and it is unknown who held the office on an interim basis pending his arrival. He arrived in the city in March 1585 and established himself in a palazzo belonging to the queen mother Catherine. He found his life easier and more comfortable in Roma than he had his service in Madrid. He would enjoy much support and many connections in Roma. As his sécretaire^{γ} he enjoyed the services of Antoine de La Boderie.

In his capacity as ambassador, he received correspondence from the queen mother Catherine and would still be receiving letters from her as late as 1588, near to her death when she was both ill and depressed. Unlike his residence in Spain, the communications he received in Roma from Catherine are well preserved.

As during his time in Spain, he was often forced to take loans to support himself, due to the lack of income he was supposed to be in receipt of. Prior to leaving the Papal States he was unable to balance his books, and as such his wife was pursued by his creditors.

=== Sixtus V ===
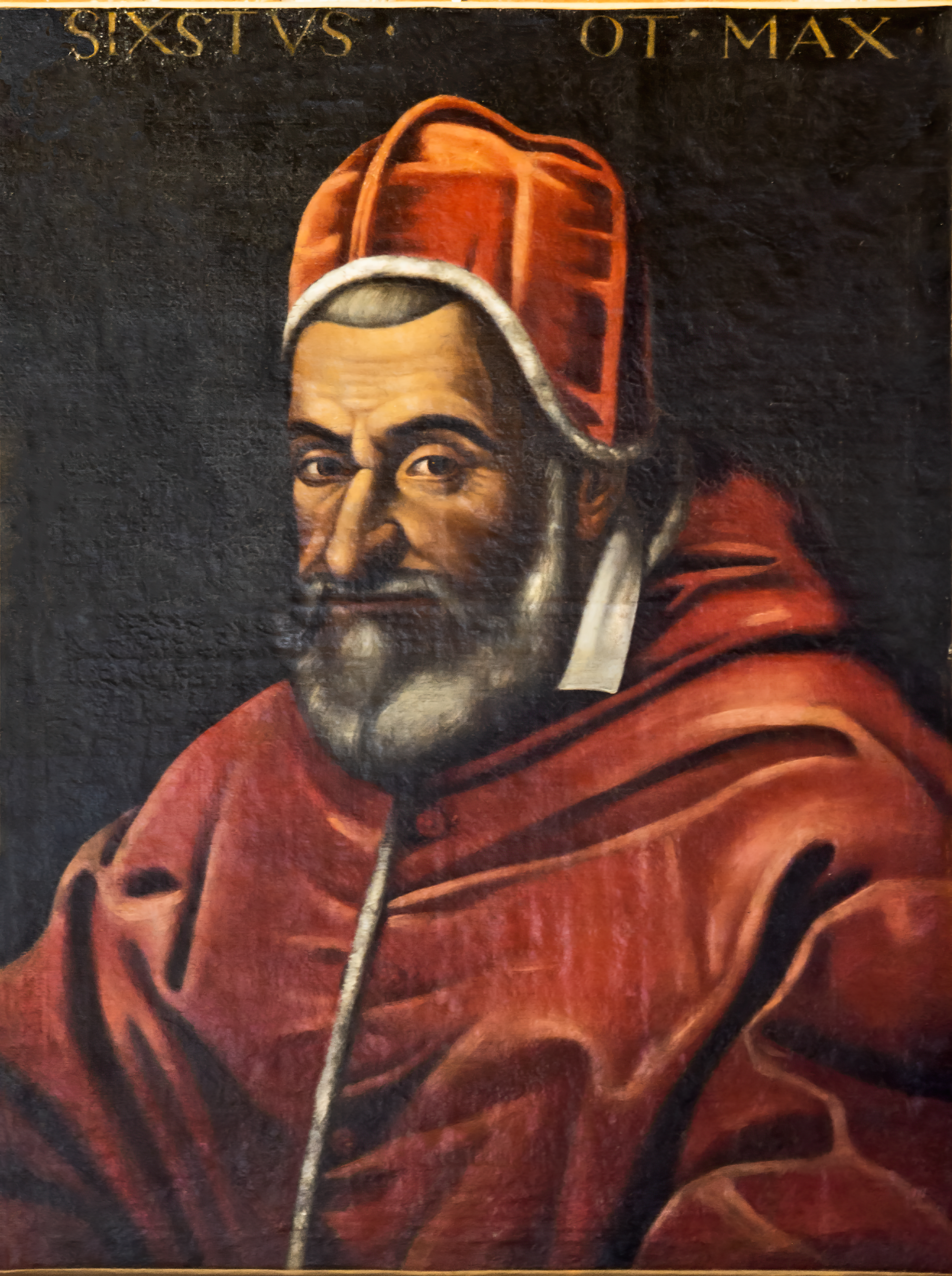
Pope Sixtus V

The following month after his establishment, in April, Pope Gregory XIII was succeeded in the Papal office by Pope Sixtus V. Sixtus endeavoured to establish himself independent of both French and Spanish influence. In his capacity as ambassador to Roma, Saint-Gouard frequently clashed with Sixtus. Despite their often tense relations, Sixtus appreciated Saint-Gouard's 'vigour and courage'. Saint-Gouard quickly succeeded in securing from him the re-establishment of an old etiquette that had been abolished by Gregory XIII. The ambassadors were to serve the Pope in the séance en capelle. Saint-Gouard as French ambassador would enjoy the second most senior position in this ceremony, behind that of the Imperial ambassador and before that of the Spanish. Frustrated at this the Spanish ambassador the count of Olivares refused to participate in the coronation ceremony on 1 May. He was also granted other symbolic honours as concerned courtly etiquette in Roma.

In his diplomatic mission, Saint-Gouard would endeavour to ensure that Sixtus distrusted the Spanish. He stated to the Pontiff that while he would not wish to bet a crown on the Spanish deceiving him, he would bet everything that when it was to their advantage to do so, they would deceive the Pope.

He would fight vigorously to defend the Catholicity and reputation of his king Henri against Sixtus. In this he was up against the cardinal de Pellevé an agent of Guise's in the Roman capital. During his ambassadorship he denounced the cardinal de Pellevé, who had been established in Roma around 1574, as a source of intrigues and mischief.

Saint-Gouard wrote to the duc de Guise in early July 1585 chiding him for his rebellion against the crown. He informed the duc that he had learned his obedience to the crown from Guise's father the previous duc de Guise. Thus, he exhorted Guise to abandon his rebellious pretensions if he did not want to sabotage the reputation of his ancestors.

The new Pope decided to recall his Papal Nuncio to France the bishop of Bergamo and replace him with the ligueur and Spanish sympathetic archbishop of Nazareth. Henri was greatly aggrieved by this and refused to receive the replacement, ordering the governor of the Lyonnais to halt his progress at Lyon. Chevallier speculates he may have been driven by the domestic frustrations he was experiencing after having been forced into a peace which conceded to his enemies in the Catholic ligue. Saint-Gouard championed Henri's decision before the Pope, even before he had received instructions from France, and demanded the Pope see to the archbishops recall. This offended the Pope so significantly that the Pope ordered that he depart the Papal States within 5 days, something he would do on 25 July 1585. Henri did not retaliate against Sixtus for the dismissal of his ambassador.

=== Exile from Roma ===
Shortly after being expelled from Roma by Sixtus and returning to France, Saint-Gouard found himself in the centre of a storm. He was suspected by the duc de Nevers of being the author of several libellous letters against him. Keen to confirm his suspicions, the duc de Nevers turned to the doctor Philippe de Cavriana in September to gather information on Saint-Gouard. Cavriana inquired of the royal entourage' as to what Saint-Gouard may have said about the duc de Nevers in his diplomatic despatches back to France. This inquisitiveness greatly aggrieved Catherine who asked Cavriana to cease his investigations. Still enquiring on the duc's behalf, several days later Cavriana got into a showdown with the royal favourite the duc d'Épernon. Épernon informed Cavriani that the ambassador had written nothing as concerned the duc de Nevers and swore as such on his honour as a gentleman. If Cavriana continued to investigate Saint-Gouard it would attract the ire of the king. While Nevers' agent took cares to speak quietly to Épernon, the latter was embarrassed that Épernon spoke loudly in front of many courtiers. Cavriana assured Épernon that if Nevers was sure that it was Saint-Gouard they would not be in this position right now. As such he was seeking more information. Cavrians pushed Épernon on the matter, asking him whether he'd seen the 'slanderous letters' and whether they had not been written in Saint-Gouard's hand. Épernon in turn replied that he had indeed seen the letters, but that they were unsigned and unmarked.

Clearly understanding the situation and appreciating that Henri was both keen to protect Saint-Gouard, and see him returned to his ambassadorial post, Cavriana advised Nevers that it would be best to end his attempts to receive satisfaction (Nevers had been seeking a duel with the ambassador). He wrote similarly to the duc's wife Henriette de Clèves advising her to intercede with her husband against his desire for revenge.

=== Pisani ===
As a further reward for his services, in May 1586 Henri erected the marquisate de Pisani in Saint-Gouard's favour, comprising his lands in Poitou and Saintonge. It would be by this name he would be known forthwith.

Henri for his part found himself subject to the distaste of the existing Papal Nuncio for his decision to seek negotiations with the Protestant king of Navarre and prince de Condé in the summer of 1586. The king justified himself on the grounds of the immiseration of the kingdom. The Nuncio begged him not to make such a decision to seek peace without first seeking the advice of the Pope. Catherine, who was to lead the negotiations, would depart to conduct them in July. Before she did she urged Pisani to sooth the Pope's concerns about her peace mission. Her efforts succeeded in securing an armistice with the Protestants which lasted until the spring of 1587.

=== Return to the Papacy ===
Thanks to the work of the cardinal de Rambouillet and cardinale d'Este, the return of Pisani to his embassy would be arranged, and thus he departed Paris back for Roma on 23 June 1586, arriving in the city on 19 August. After the return of Pisani to Roma, Henri consented to the replacement of the bishop of Bergamo with the archbishop of Nazareth as Papal Nuncio.

In late August, Pisani reported back to Henri of the Pope's disapproval for Catherine's peace mission. The Pope reminded Pisani that until such time as 'heresy' was vanquished in France, Henri could not truly be absolute master of his kingdom. There was also much domestic opposition to the efforts to broker peace between the royal party and the Protestants both radical preachers and from the ligueur lords like the duc de Guise (who liaised with the new Papal Nuncio on his plans to reject a peace).

It was with sadness that Pisani observed the death of the cardinal of Este, a great supporter of the French in December 1586. However this was counterbalanced by a new ally for the protection of French affairs the cardinal de Joyeuse.

A flood of Catholic outrage greeted the execution of Mary Stuart on 1 March 1587 by the English queen Elizabeth I. The Pope enquired of Pisani as to how Henri was planning to respond to the killing, 'was Henri going to avenge the murder, as he was obligated to do for his honour?'. Henri was no more able to avenge the death of Mary than he was to stop her execution. He contented himself to host a solemn service in Paris in her memory.

Relations between the Papacy and Henri were improved at this time. In March 1587 the hostile Papal Nuncio archbishop of Nazareth died and was replaced by the pro-French bishop of Brescia in the charge. Sixtus opined to Pisani that the rebellion of Guise against the crown was of advantage to the Protestants. The Catholic ligue should unite with the crown for the destruction of Protestantism.

In August the Pope authorised an alienation of 500,000 écus of church land in France. This was in response to his being informed that Henri intended to personally lead an army against the Protestants. Pisani sent a porter to inform Henri of the Pope's decision When word arrived in France, the clergy was outraged and protested against the measure. They were soothed by the cardinal de Gondi and the new Papal Nuncio. Due to the fact the money was not presently available, Henri asked Pisani to request a 400,000 écus loan from the Pope in return for receipt of interest from the alienation.

In early 1588, the Papal Nuncio tried to nudge Henri towards delivering his campaign against the Protestants. Henri was reluctant to comply, and argued that if he threw himself against the Protestants, he would be leaving Picardy and Normandy in the hands of the ligue. The Nuncio retorted that Henri had two enemies, and as he could only make war on one it should be the Protestants. On 18 February, Henri wrote to Pisani asking him to see to it that the Pope reminded the ligue of their need to show obedience to him and see to the service of god, as opposed to their ambitions.

=== Crisis of the French crown ===
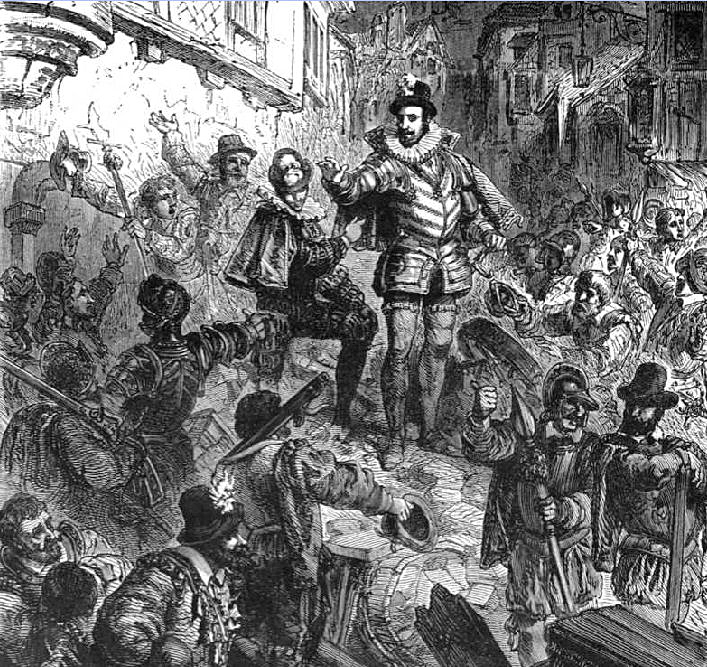
Duc de Guise on top the barricades in Paris during the ligueur uprising in the city

Having established an agreement with the Spanish king Philip, when the time came in April for a conference at Soissons between Henri's surintendant des finances Bellièvre and the ligueurs the duc de Guise, and cardinals of Bourbon and Guise there was no prospect of an accord being reached. The Papal Nuncio informed Sixtus of the conferences failure before it had opened. Pisani continued to push Sixtus to make it clear to the ligueurs that they needed to unite loyally with the king to achieve the destruction of Protestantism. However, the speed of the Pope's response did not reflect the urgency of the situation. From 10 to 13 May 1588 the ligue rose up in Paris with Guise at its head, and attempted to impose a settlement on Henri.

After the humiliation of the day of the Barricades, Henri retreated from Paris to Chartres leaving the capital in the hands of the ligueur rebels. He opined to his ambassador in Roma that he held duc de Guise solely responsible for the uprising. Pisani was to assure the Pope that Henri remained committed to wage war against the Protestants in Poitou, but before he could do this, Guise needed to be removed from the capital and returned to his governate of Champagne. If Guise continued to further his own ambitions, Henri would be compelled to preserve what authority he had left by combatting the duc. He furthered this with a letter to the Pope in which he obliquely implied he could be compelled to assassinate Guise (though he did not name him in his letter to Sixtus) when he stated that the extreme circumstances he found himself in might force him to resort to extreme remedies.

=== Dispute over precedence ===
Pisani would demonstrate his hostility to the Spanish at the Papal court over the matter of the canonisation of a Spanish Franciscan named Diego de Alcalá. For Philip the canonisation was a great honour and the count of Olivares wished to enjoy diplomatic precedence for this day which would be in honour of Spain. To facilitate this, the cardinale de Rusticucci (cardinal of Rusticucci) appealed to Pisani on 25 June to call in sick on the day of the event (2 July). Pisani reported to Henri his horror at the prospect, saying that even were he on the 'point of death' he would still 'drag himself on his stomach' to show the king of Spain that he was inferior to the king of France. He added that saints belonged to all countries, and if Spain wished to have a monopoly on this saint, then he should be excluded from the common calendar. He affirmed to Henri his determination to be at the ceremony, and honour Diego as a universal saint.

Refusing to back down despite Rusticucci's pleas, he attended the ceremony with his precedence over the Spanish. Unable to tolerate this, Olivares called in sick to be replaced by cardinal Deza. Olivares would not forgive the French for a long time.

On 4 July Henri noted with impatience to Pisani that if he did not have peace in his kingdom within the next several weeks, he would enter open war with the ligueurs. He thanked the Pope through Pisani for offering the services of a Legate, but requested this role be given to the Nuncio. On 21 July he concluded an agreement with the ligueurs in the edict of Union in which he swore never again to make an accord with 'heretics'. Similarly France was never to have a 'heretical' king, he would adopt the decisions of the Council of Trent, grant to the Catholic princes the towns conceded to them in the 1585 treaty of Nemours, relieve Épernon of his governate of Boulogne and sell off the property of Protestants. With this agreement confirmed, Henri assured Pisani he would now be waging war against the Protestants alongside the ligueur leaders the duc de Guise and duc de Mayenne.

=== Assassination of the duc and cardinal ===
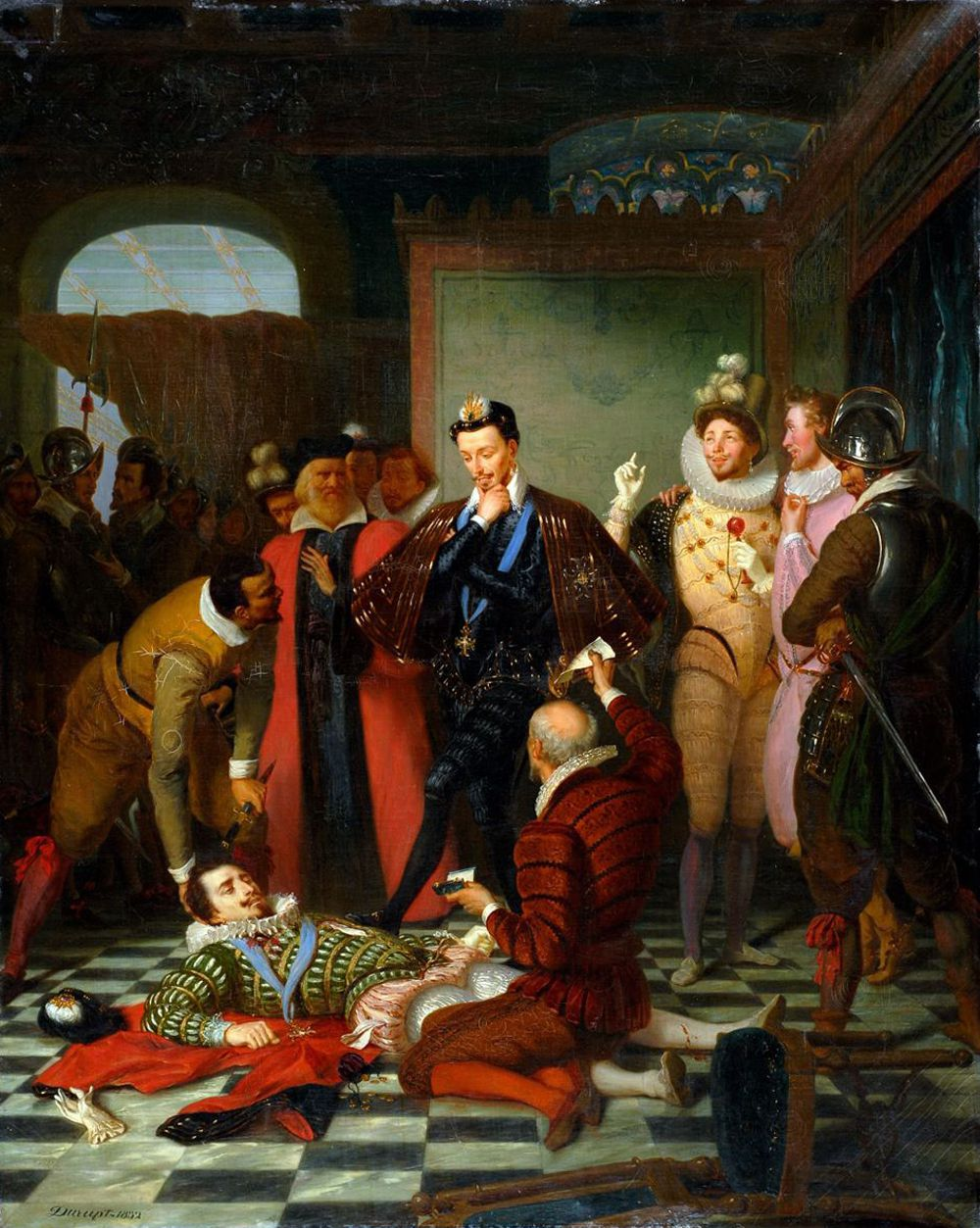
Assassination of the duc de Guise

Though Henri had initially acceded to the demands of the ligue, he chafed at the duc's tutelage and this was furthered by his suspicion that Guise was behind the defiance of the Estates General to him. Thus he resolved to assassinate the duc in December 1588. After have effected the assassination of the duc de Guise, Henri moved to ensuring the act was properly justified internationally. André Hurault de Maisse who was departing for Italy was instructed to inform the late duc's maternal uncle the duca di Ferrara that Guise had been poisoned by his ambition and was planning to seize Henri and hand him over to the ligueurs in Paris. Henri was confident that the Pope would approve of the act he had undertaken, and wrote to Pisani to this effect. He justified himself on the grounds that Guise was a threat to not only his crown but also his life. Almost as an afterthought the king mentioned the assassination of the cardinal de Guise. Pisani was further informed that the Pope would see it as not only lawful but also a pious act. By this means, Henri declared, he had stemmed the greatest source of strife between his Catholic subjects. To assist Pisani in this effort with the Pope would be the cardinal de Joyeuse. Henri's impression that the Pope might be supportive was not drawn from nothing, as a few months previous the Pope had urged him to punish those who defied his authority with severity.

The Papal Nuncio in France decided against excommunicating Henri out of fear it could drive him into the arms of the Protestants, and therefore left the decision in the hands of the Pope.

=== Justifying the killings ===
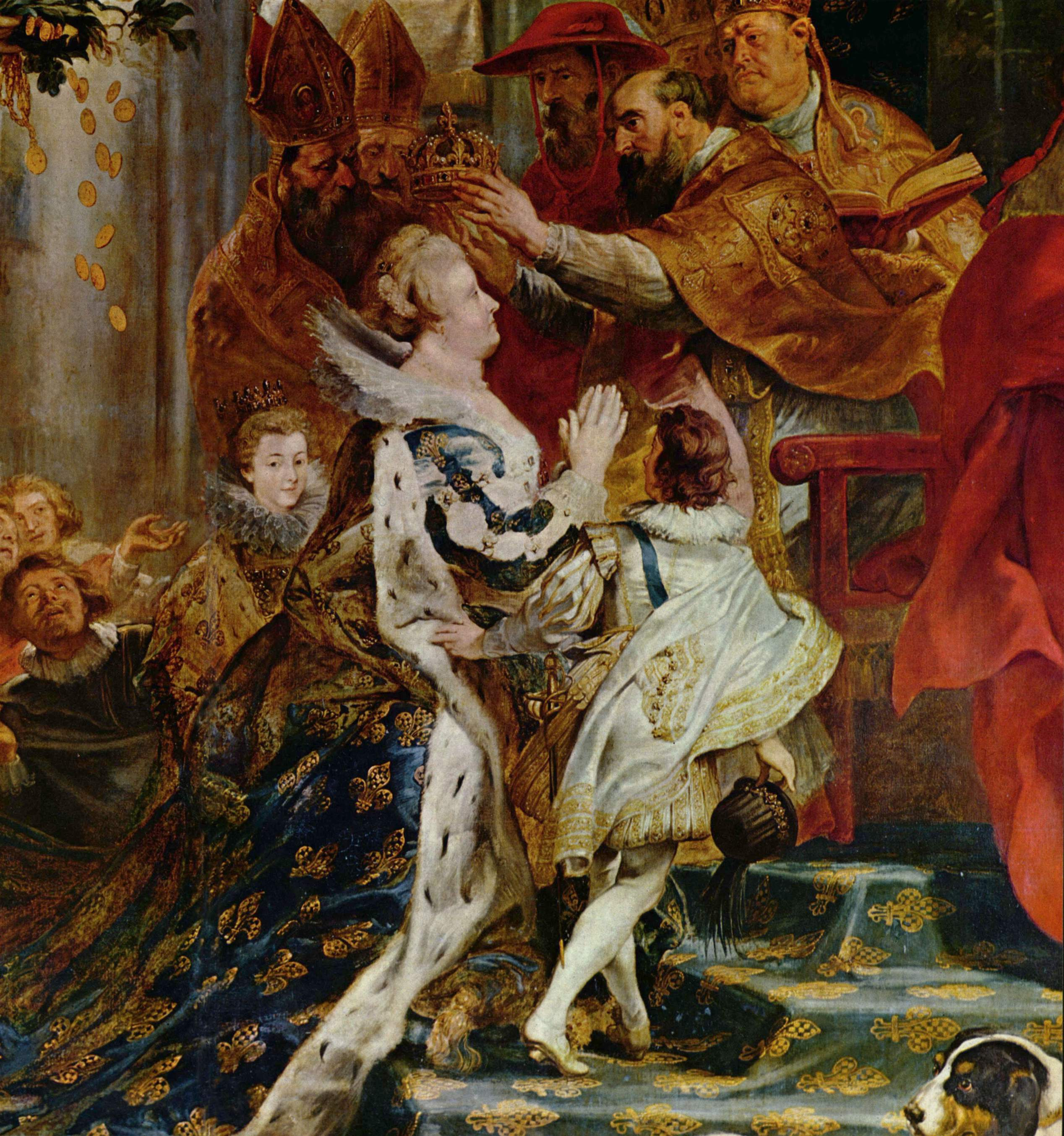
Cardinal de Joyeuse who would assist Pisani in his attempted negotiations with Pope Sixtus V

On 4 January word reached the Papacy of the assassinations that had transpired at Blois. This was followed a day later by the official notice of the act from Henri. According to cardinal de Joyeuse, the Pope was not surprised to learn of the assassinations, remarking that Guise and his brother had received several warnings of the king's intentions. On 6 January Pisani, who had not yet received his diplomatic despatch from the king, met with the Pope. Pisani attempted to explain Henri's actions. Pope Sixtus restrained himself in his reactions, asking only if Pisani had ever heard of a prince who killed a cardinal.

However, in his next meeting, with the Venetian ambassador, the Pope exploded in anger. He argued to the ambassador that if Henri had executed the duc de Guise after the day of the barricades it would have been one thing, but to kill the duc after having made a public reconciliation with him was murder and not justice. This was furthered in his meetings with the Spanish representative. On 7 January Joyeuse spoke with Sixtus and tried to justify the 'deserved end' of the ligueur princes. The Pope cut him off, crying that that was not the way to deal with men of such quality. Guise should have been arrested, and the cardinal sent to Roma for trial. Joyeuse retorted that the Pope himself had proposed to Henri that he should defenestrate the duc de Guise back in May. The king only needed the forgiveness of god for the killing of the duc, however the cardinal informed the pope that Henri wished to receive absolution for the death of cardinal de Guise.

On 9 January Sixtus discussed the murder of the cardinal de Guise with the cardinals of the consistory, arguing to the body that the deed could not go unpunished. Both Pisani and Joyeuse grew fearful that extraordinary penance might be imposed on Henri as a result.

After the meeting of cardinals on 10 January it was decided to suspend consistorial matters related to France. Joyeuse opined fearfully that this could cause a break between the French and Roman churches, and a return to pre-Concordat elections in the French church. Joyeuse advised Henri that he would need to request absolution from the Pope, and also release the ligueur cardinal de Bourbon and archbishop of Lyon who he had arrested.

In early January Henri sent to Pisani and Joyeuse the brief which the Pope had provided him on 20 July 1587. This brief granted him the privilege to receive absolution for his sins for a confessor of his choosing, including for sins that would normally be the business of the Holy See, such as the automatic excommunication the killing of a cardinal resulted in (the king had killed the cardinal de Guise alongside the duc de Guise). When the Pope was reminded of this brief, he retorted that it only applied to sins committed prior to its granting. In January the commander of Dyo was sent to the Holy See by the duc de Guise's brother the duc de Mayenne to represent him. Dyo took the position that after the murder of the duc and cardinal all good Catholics were fearful and required the protection of an act emanating from the Pope.

During these months, the ligueur representative in the Papal court, Jean de Piles, abbot of Orbais worked to convince the Pope to excommunicate Henri. Pisani denounced the abbot as a pernicious agent of the Lorraine princes on 25 January. Ligueur pamphlets printed in Paris were also sent to Roma.

From January to February 1589, the cardinal de Joyeuse and Pisani negotiated with the Pope. Joyeuse seeing that neither he nor Pisani were making any impression on the Pontiff after a month of work, wrote to Henri urging him to establish a special envoy who would request absolution for him. Henri conceded to the Pope's position and his representative the bishop of Le Mans was sent to Roma. The bishop arrived on 23 February and was received by the Pope two days later. He enjoyed several audiences with the Pope, and in one on 8 March the Pope demanded that the envoy provide a simple request for the king's absolution. After Le Mans again demurred on the grounds of the rights of the king and French nation, Sixtus exploded and threatened to imprison the bishop. Pisani who was also present for the audience protested that it was the duty of ambassadors to explain their masters reasoning. On 13 March Joyeuse brokered an agreement by which the bishop of Le Mans would make the appeal for absolution, kneeling at the feet of the Pope he confessed on the behalf of Henri. The Pope declared his satisfaction but maintained his refusal of absolution until such time as the archbishop of Lyon and cardinal de Bourbon were released, as this had not yet come to pass. Subsequently, in April Henri entered into alliance with his distant Protestant cousin and heir the king of Navarre, throwing the prospect of agreement with the Papacy into doubt. The Pope's ambassador in France withdrew from the court after the agreement was reached, staying in Lyon until the death of the king.

Over the coming months, Henri continued to fail to release the archbishop of Lyon and cardinal de Bourbon from prison. However now the Pope was more incensed to learn of Henri's alliance with the Protestant king. On 5 May, Sixtus announced his decision, Henri must release the archbishop of Lyon and cardinal de Bourbon within ten days. Within sixty days he must either come to Roma himself or send a proxy to represent him. If he failed to undertake both of these acts he would be excommunicated. In this declaration he did not mention Henri's alliance with Navarre but admitted to the Venetian ambassador that it was the reason he had made the declaration. Judging Henri's situation to be desperate he expected the king's submission and readied himself to open his arms to the errant prince. Pisani for his part attempted to stop the publication of the decision, but was unsuccessful. On 8 May Pisani spoke with 'pride and loyalty' to Sixtus that Henri maintained his continual obedience to the Pontiff, but that the king's ministers expected to be able to speak frankly, and not threatened with prison. Neither prison nor death would stop his advocacy for his king. The Pope was stunned by this address. During May, the military situation for the ligue in France declined greatly after the loss of the battle of Senlis, Navarre writing confidently that soon Paris might fall to them. In response to this Mayenne looked to Roma for a coup of his own, hoping to see the expelling of Pisani, the prosecution of the bishop of Le Mans and the declaration of a crusade. Upon the publication of the Papal monitoire (warning that proceeds excommunication) on 26 May, both Joyeuse and Pisani abandoned Roma. 1589 thus represented the end of Pisani's tenure as ambassador to the Papacy, the marquis judging the publication of the monitoire to conclude his ambassadorship. Henri was distraught to learn of his excommunication, but was reassured by Navarre that the true way to respond to the Pope's move was to recapture Paris. The withdrawal of Pisani from Roma would be one piece of the diplomatic withdrawals which would typify the early reign of Henri III's Protestant successor due to his lack of recognition in the Catholic courts.

=== Withdrawal from Roma ===
After tarrying for a while in Florence, Pisani embarked at Livorno for France alongside the bishop of Le Mans. Joyeuse meanwhile travelled on to Venice. On route back to France the ship Pisani and Le Mans were travelling in was attacked by a corsair, Pisani led the successful repelling of the attacker, allowing them to reach Languedoc. When informed, Sixtus was impressed to learn of Pisani's feat.

At the time of the assassination of Henri III on 1 August 1589, Pisani was residing on his estates in the marquisate of Pisani. The change of dynasty from Valois to Bourbon that accompanied the death of Henri III did not result in Pisani's loss of importance, and through his reputation and political significance he entered into the confidence of the new king.

== Reign of Henri IV ==
=== Royalist ===
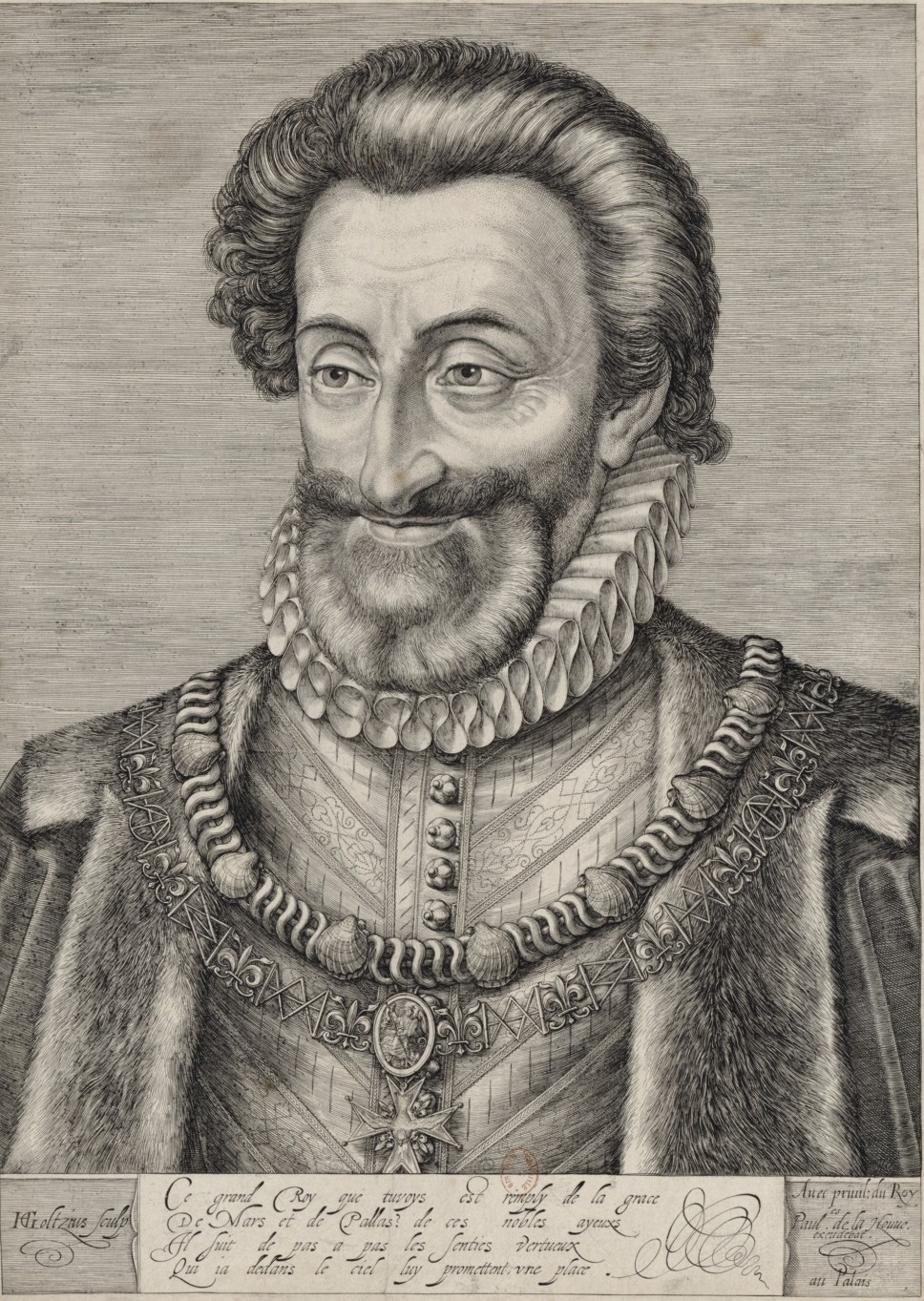
Henri III's distant cousin the Protestant king of Navarre who succeeded him to the French throne as Henri IV

Many French Catholics were left in a difficult position after the assassination of Henri III. The royal army that was besieging Paris collapsed from a size of 40,000 men to 18,000, many soldiers deserting rather than lending their services to a Protestant. They now faced the prospect of having to serve a Protestant king. While this was too much for some, in the following days many nobles of Guyenne swore themselves to the king of Navarre as Henri IV. Among them were maréchal de Matignon and Biron, the duc de Ventadour, the seigneur de La Rochefoucauld, the comte de La Vauguyon, the duc de Thouars and Pisani. These were all military nobles capable of mobilising their networks in the favour of the new king. For Pisani it was a matter of monarchical loyalty.

The new king appointed him lieutenant in the escadron de la cornette blanche (squadron of the white cornet). He maintained proximity to the king, always armoured, despite his considerable age.

In October 1589 he returned to Roma briefly for a brief extraordinary mission so as to secure for the duc de Luxembourg an audience with the Pope. Despite Spanish opposition, this mission was a success.

In July 1590, Pisani undertook a conference for Henri at Saint-Germain with the Papal legate Caetani. Peace was discussed in the meeting, on the understanding of Henri's conversion to Catholicism. Saint-Gouard did not address this condition, but passed it on to some nobles of the army, who brought it to the king's attention via his cousin the comte de Soissons. However this meeting bore no fruit.

=== Absolution ===
The Pope greatly opposed the Protestant Navarre's assumption of the crown. All Catholics who supported him were ordered to withdraw their support on pains of excommunication. Beyond his spiritual interventions, the Pope dispatched a small army to support the ligueur cause in their war with Henri, however it was badly ravaged by dysentery and accomplished little. With the death of Pope Gregory in October 1591 a new election was held. The new Pope, elected in January 1592 maintained his support for the ligueur cause. Henri meanwhile dispatched two of his supporters who he hoped would be well received by the Papacy on 4 October, Pisani and the cardinal de Gondi. They were to swear Henri's support for the Pope and that in the same manner as his predecessors he had a 'filial devotion' to the Holy See. The Papal Legate informed Pisani and Gondi that they would not be welcome in the Papal territories as the Pope did not wish to meet with representatives of the 'king of Navarre'. Pisani knew that the Pope would not agree to meet with him and that he would likely only be able to make his devotions to Loreto. However the Pope continued to direct his severity against Catholic supporters of Henri IV. Thus, with Pisani and the cardinal de Gondi on the road to Roma to ask the Pope to assist in the potential conversion of Henri to Catholicism, the Pope forbid them to continue their journey. He was supported in his refusal to meet with Pisani and Gondi by the ligueur agents in Roma. As such the royalist party stopped its journey in Florence, forbidden from travelling further. Meanwhile, emissaries from the ligueur duc de Mayenne assured the Pope that Henri would not convert to Catholicism and that if he did it would be a simulacrum.

On 25 July 1593 Henri abjured Protestantism and became a Catholic. Many Catholics however suspected his conversion was cynical or invalid. To this end Henri redoubled his efforts to gain absolution from the Pope. He was supported in this effort by the Tuscan and Venetian ambassadors in Roma who faced off with the Spanish Papal ambassador who sought to convince the Pope to continue the fight. From late 1592 the Venetian ambassador had convinced Clement military and financial support towards the Catholic ligue was playing into the hands of the Spanish. The Pope remained determined though not to receive Gondi and Pisani, and upon receiving word of Henri's adoption of Catholicism considered declaring the Catholics who received him schismatics. He was talked out of this by the Venetian ambassador on the grounds it would accelerate French Gallican sentiment. The reason for the Pope's refusal to see the two envoys was, according to a 'well connected' priest due to his fear of the Spanish reprisals he would be inviting if he were to take such a step. Henri resolved to send a new diplomatic mission, led by a man that the Pope could not refuse to see, the Italian Catholic the duc de Nevers. In November 1593 the Pope agreed to receive the duc de Nevers, however only in his capacity as a private person and not as a representative of Henri IV. Even after this meeting the Pope remained firm, declaring Henri could not be absolved as he 'persisted in his errors'. It would only be in August 1595 that conditional absolution was granted to the French king.

=== Return to France ===
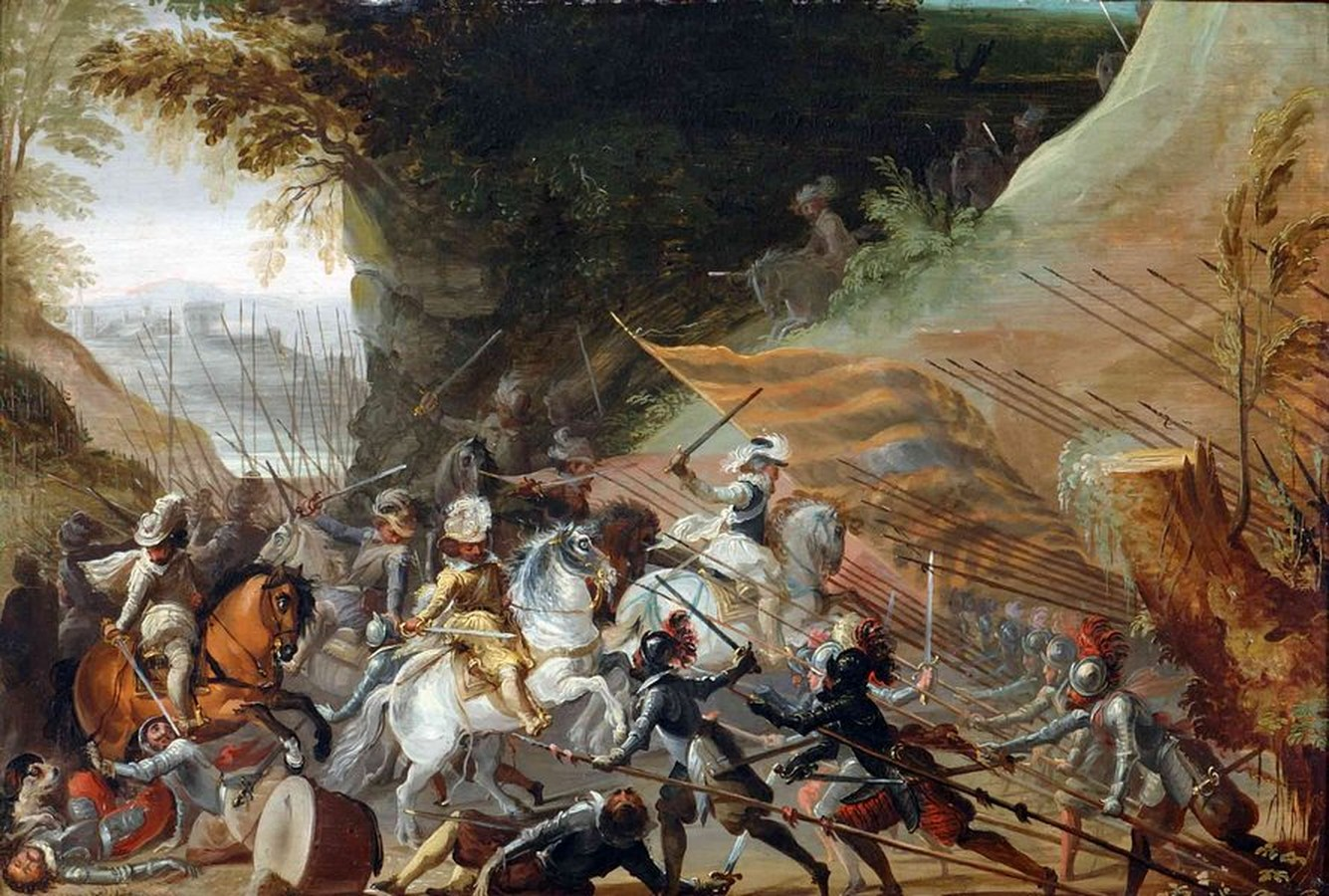
Royalist victory at the battle of Fontaine-Française which saw Henri triumph over the ligueur-Spanish army

Having stayed in northern Italy since his arrival in late 1592, Pisani returned to France in early 1594. During his stay he had felt useless.

During the crisis of the Croquant rebellions, armed peasant bands rose across much of southern France. Henri resolved that he must employ a gentle hand to defuse their grievances. He opined to the lieutenant-general of Haute-Auvergne, that if he came down harshly on the movement, it would entail further damages. In the Limoges the rebel peasants numbered around 12–15,000. While working towards the disarmament of this group, a band of nobles charged into the peasants in June 1594, killing many. The sieur de Boissise arrived sometime after this and promised a reduction of the taille (the land tax). He then undertook a siege of the château de Gimel which was held by some rebel seigneurs. A little while later in October, Pisani arrived with a military force and undertook a limited expedition. Maréchal de Matignon then continued the work of ending the rebellion peaceably, and attempted to avoid prosecution of the Croquant ringleaders to this effect. However, in 1595 the heat of the conflict would rise again and there would be a battle before the Croquant leadership submitted, soothed further by tax relief Henri ordered in 1596 and 1599.

With 'surprising youthfulness', Pisani fought alongside the king at the royalist victory of the battle of Fontaine-Française in 1595. This battle facilitated the defection of the lieutenant-general of the ligue Mayenne, who abandoned his Spanish allies in disgust.

=== Governor of Condé ===
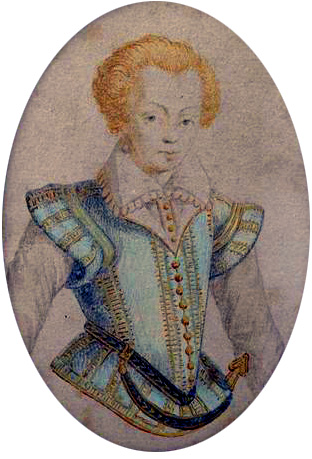
Prince de Condé as a young child

The aged marquis was granted the honour in 1596 of raising the eight year old prince de Condé in the Catholic faith after Henri received absolution from the Papacy. At this time the prince was the heir to the French throne, though he would not remain such. He would also be governor of the prince's properties. He settled with the young prince at Saint-Germain-en-Laye. The governor found himself in conflict with the prince's mother Charlotte-Catherine over the choice of tutor for the prince. While she favoured Joseph Justus Scaliger for her son, this was opposed by Henri who hated Scaliger. He favoured Nicolas Lefèvre, a man whose religious disposition suited Pisani. The hatred between the princesse de Condé and Henri exasperated Pisani, who was fundamentally a man of the king. Given the princesse's distaste for Henri, this complicated matters.

According to an anecdote from Tallémant des Réaux, at a certain time Pisani and the young Condé were walking together when they passed a peasant who threw himself to the ground before the prince. Condé did not even gesture towards the peasant, and Pisani took him to task over this. He argued to the prince that without the peasant, there would be no food for the nobility and princes to eat.

On 21 May 1596 Pisani wrote his will. He expressed his desire to be buried in the cathedral of Saintes. His nondomestic property was to go to his wife as well as the usufruct of his French properties. Meanwhile, his daughter would enjoy possession of the French territories. His wife was to return to the king his collier (collar) of the ordre du Saint-Esprit with the appropriate honours worthy of the order. All outstanding sums that were owed to him were to be paid to his descendants.

Henri established Pisani as the sénéchal (seneschal) of Poitou and as the colonel-général de la cavalerie légère italienne (colonel general of the Italian light cavalry).

Pisani died on 7 October 1599 at Saint-Maur near Paris. He was succeeded as governor of the prince de Condé by the ligueur comte de Belin who got on far better with the princesse de Condé.

Pisani's widow received support from Pisani's network of friends.

== Reputation ==
Henri III's sécretaire Jules Gassot spoke very highly of the marquis de Pisani. In his estimation Pisani was an unusually excellent lord. The sécretaire described his ascetic lifestyle, with preponderance for vegetables and 'clear water'. In addition to this virtue, Pisani was a 'devout Catholic' who was also devoted to royal service, and acted with honour and virtue.

For the historian Ribera, Pisani appeared 'Gascon' in disposition: sensitive to slight and ready to brawl or cross swords. As an ambassador he could be argued to have been 'haughty and accusatory'. He was uncompromising in his defence of the honour of the French crown, with he and his colleagues sometimes losing themselves in their service. The historian argues that of all the French ambassadors of the period he was the most absolute in his defence of French policy and his inability to tolerate any Spanish interference in French internal affairs. He had a strong sense of honour and the importance of service to the crown. He enjoyed confusing his adversaries to such a degree it sometimes hampered his ability to achieve results. Though Catholic, religion concerned him little and for Ribera his true religion was royalism.

== Notes ==
^α The sieur de Longlée was not technically ambassador to Spain but rather a permanent resident.
^β A connection can be established between the Vivonne of the Sixteenth-Century and 'Hugues de Vivonne' who lived around 1050.
^γ The role of the sécretaire to the ambassador was severalfold. They could act as a discreet spokesman, a courier, write the ambassadors despatches and in the absence of the ambassador could take care of affairs on a temporary basis. Ribera argues courier service offered useful skills for future diplomats, in that it incentivised the learning of language and the customs of the foreign state. Longlée received 400 écus from Saint-Gouard for the performance of courier services.

== Sources ==
- Amalric, Jean-Pierre (2018). "Préface". Diplomatie et Espionnage: Les Ambassadeurs du Roi de France auprès de Philippe II - Du Traité du Cateau-Cambrésis (1559) à la mort de Henri III (1589). Classiques Garnier.
- Babelon, Jean-Pierre (2009). Henri IV. Fayard.
- Boucher, Jacqueline (1998). "Saint-Goard-Pisani". In Jouanna, Arlette; Boucher, Jacqueline; Biloghi, Dominique; Le Thiec, Guy (eds.). Histoire et Dictionnaire des Guerres de Religion.
- Carpi, Olivia (2012). Les Guerres de Religion (1559-1598): Un Conflit Franco-Français. Ellipses.
- Carroll, Stuart (2011). Martyrs and Murderers: The Guise Family and the Making of Europe. Oxford University Press.
- Chevallier, Pierre (1985). Henri III: Roi Shakespearien. Fayard.
- Cloulas, Ivan (1979). Catherine de Médicis. Fayard.
- Constant, Jean-Marie (1984). Les Guise. Hachette.
- Constant, Jean-Marie (1996). La Ligue. Fayard.
- Crouzet, Denis (2014). "Préface". Une Reine Épistolaire: Lettres et Pouvoir au Temps de Catherine de Médicis. Classiques Garnier.
- Gellard, Matthieu (2014). Une Reine Épistolaire: Lettres et Pouvoir au Temps de Catherine de Médicis. Classiques Garnier.
- Haan, Bertrand (2011). L'Amitié Entre Princes: Une Alliance Franco-Espagnole au Temps des Guerres de Religion (1560-1570). Presses Universitaires de France.
- Jouanna, Arlette (1998). "Le Temps des Guerres de Religion en France (1559-1598)". In Jouanna, Arlette; Boucher, Jacqueline; Biloghi, Dominique; Le Thiec, Guy (eds.). Histoire et Dictionnaire des Guerres de Religion.
- Knecht, Robert (2016). Hero or Tyrant? Henry III, King of France, 1574-1589. Routledge.
- Le Person, Xavier (2002). «Practiques» et «practiqueurs»: la vie politique à la fin du règne de Henri III (1584-1589). Librairie Droz.
- Le Roux, Nicolas (2006). Un Régicide au nom de Dieu: L'Assassinat d'Henri III. Gallimard.
- Le Roux, Nicolas (2020). Portraits d'un Royaume: Henri III, la Noblesse et la Ligue. Passés Composés.
- Le Roux, Nicolas (2022). 1559-1629 Les Guerres de Religion. Gallimard.
- Micallef, Fabrice (2023). "La Puissance Italiennes face aux Guerres de Religion en France". In Le Roux, Nicolas (ed.). Les Guerres de Religion: Une Histoire de l'Europe au XVIe Siècle.
- Pernot, Michel (2013). Henri III: Le Roi Décrié. Éditions de Fallois.
- Pitts, Vincent (2012). Henri IV of France: His Reign and Age. Johns Hopkins University Press.
- Ribera, Jean-Michel (2018). Diplomatie et Espionnage: Les Ambassadeurs du Roi de France auprès de Philippe II - Du Traité du Cateau-Cambrésis (1559) à la mort de Henri III (1589). Classiques Garnier.
- Salmon, J.H.M (1979). Society in Crisis: France during the Sixteenth Century. Metheun & Co.
- Sutherland, Nicola (1980). The Huguenot Struggle for Recognition. Yale University Press.
