= List of ambassadors of France to the Holy See =

This incomplete list of French ambassadors to the Holy See since the Middle Ages includes all regimes from the Kingdom of France to the current French Republic:

== Ambassadors from the Kingdom of France ==
- 1485-1491: Jean Balue
- 1491-1499: Jean de Bilhères
- ...
- 1531-1533: François II de Dinteville, Bishop of Auxerre
- 1533-1536: Jean du Bellay
- 1536-1539: Georges de Selve
- 1539-1547: Georges d'Armagnac
- 1547-1550: Claude d'Urfé
- 1550-1552: Paul de Thermes
- 1552-1553: Claude de La Guiche, Bishop of Mirepoix
- 1553-1554: Louis de Saint-Gelais
- 1554-1555: Odet de Selve
- 1555: Jean d'Avançon
- 1558-1561: Philibert Babou de la Bourdaisière, bishop of Angoulême.
- 1561-1563: André Guillart, seigneur de L'Isle.
- 1564-1566: Henri Cleutin, seigneur d'Oisel.
- 1566-1568: Just de Tournon, count of Tournon.
- 1568-1571: Charles d'Angennes, bishop of Le Mans.
- 1571-1575: François Rougier, baron de Ferrals.
- 1576-1581: Louis Chasteigner, seigneur de La Rochepozay.
- 1581-1584: Paul de Foix, archbishop of Toulouse.
- 1585: Jean de Vivonne, marquis de Pisani.
- 1586-1589: Jean de Vivonne, marquis de Pisani.
- 1594-1597: Jacques Davy Duperron
- 1597-1599: François de Luxembourg, duc de Piney
- 1599-1601: Nicolas Brûlart de Sillery
- 1601-1605: Philippe de Béthune
- 1605-1605: Jacques Davy Duperron
- 1608-1614: François Savary de Brèves
- 1614-1616: Alexandre, Chevalier de Vendôme
- 1619-1622: François Annibal d'Estrées
- 1622-1624: Noël Brûlart de Sillery
- 1624-1630: Philippe de Béthune (2nd term)
- 1633-1634: Jean de Galard de Béarn
- 1635-1636: Alphonse-Louis du Plessis de Richelieu
- 1636-1648: François Annibal d'Estrées
- 1648-1649: Michele Mazzarino
- 1651-1654: Henri d'Estampes de Valencay
- 1654-1659?: Hugues de Lionne
- 1662-1665: Charles III de Créquy
- 1667-1670?: Charles d'Albert d'Ailly
- 1671-1687: François Annibal II d'Estrées
- 1687-1689: Henri-Charles de Beaumanoir of Lavardin
- 1689-1691: Charles d'Albert d'Ailly (2nd term)
- 1698-1700: Cardinal de Bouillon
- 1700-1701: Louis I, Prince of Monaco, died in office
- 1701-1706: Toussaint de Forbin-Janson
- 1706-1720: Joseph-Emmanuel de La Trémoille
- 1715-1715?: Michel Amelot de Gournay
- 1721-1724: Pierre Guérin de Tencin
- 1724-1731: Melchior de Polignac
- 1731-1740: Paul-Hippolyte de Beauvilliers, duke of Saint-Aignan
- 1742-1744: Claude-François de Montboissier de Canillac de Beaufort
- 1745-1747: Frédéric Jérôme de La Rochefoucauld
- 1748-1752: Louis Jules Mancini Mazarini
- 1753-1757: Étienne François, count of Stainville, later duc de Choiseul
- 1758-1762: Henri Joseph Bouchard d'Esparbès de Lussan d'Aubeterre
- 1769-1791: François-Joachim de Pierre de Bernis

Officially recalled in 1791, Bernis was not replaced due to the French Revolution

== Ambassadors 1789-1945 ==
- 1793?-1797?: François Cacault, envoy to the Pope
- 1797: Joseph Bonaparte
- 1801-1803: François Cacault (second appointment)
- 1803-1806: Joseph Fesch
- 1806: Gabriel Cortois de Pressigny

Rome was annexed to the French Empire between 1806-1814

- 1814-1816: Gabriel Cortois de Pressigny
- 1816-1822?: Pierre Louis Jean Casimir de Blacas
- 1822-1828: Anne-Adrien-Pierre de Montmorency-Laval
- 1828-1829: François-René de Chateaubriand, the famous Romantic poet
- 1829-1830: Auguste, comte de La Ferronays
- 1832-1841: Louis de Beaupoil de Saint-Aulaire
- 1845-1848: Pellegrino Rossi
- 1849: Francisque de Corcelle
- 1850-1857: Alphonse de Rayneval
- 1857-1861: Agénor de Gramont
- 1861-1862: Charles, marquis de La Valette
- 1862-1863: Godefroi, prince de La Tour d'Auvergne-Lauraguais
- 1864-1868: Eugène de Sartiges
- 1868-1871: Marquis de Banneville

=== Third Republic ===
- 1870-1871: Édouard Lefebvre de Béhaine, chargé d'affaires
- 1871-1873: Count Bernard d'Harcourt
- 1873-1876: Francisque de Corcelle (second appointment)
- 1876-1878: Georges Napoléon Baude
- 1878-1880: Joseph de Cadoine de Gabriac
- 1880-1882: Ferdinand Henry de Navenne
- 1882-1896: Édouard Lefebvre de Béhaine (was chargé d'affaires in 1870)
- 1896-1898: Eugène Poubelle
- 1899?-1904: Armand Nisard

Diplomatic relations were broken from 1904-1921 due to the French separation of Church and State

  - 1920: Gabriel Hanotaux, extraordinary embassy for the canonization of Joan of Arc
- 1921-1923: Charles Jonnart
- 1932-1940: François Charles-Roux
- 1940: Wladimir d'Ormesson

=== Vichy France ===
- 1940-1944: Léon Bérard
  - François de Vial, attaché

== Ambassadors since 1945 ==
=== Provisional Government ===
- 1945-1948: Jacques Maritain

=== Fourth Republic ===
- 1948-1956: Wladimir d'Ormesson (second appointment)
- 1956-1959: Roland de Margerie

=== Fifth Republic ===
- 1959-1964: Guy de la Tournelle
- 1964-1974: René Brouillet
- 1974-1976: Gérard Amanrich
- 1976-1979: Georges Galichon
- 1979-1983: Louis Dauge
- 1983-1985: Xavier de La Chevalerie
- 1985-1988: Bertrand Dufourcq
- 1988-1991: Jean-Bernard Raimond
- 1991-1993: René Ala
- 1993-1995: Alain Pierret
- 1995-1998: Jean-Louis Lucet
- 1998-2000: Jean Guéguinou
- 2000-2001: Alain Dejammet
- 2001-2005: Pierre Morel
- 2005-2007: Bernard Kessedjian
- 2009-2012: Stanislas de Laboulaye
- 2012-2015: Bruno Joubert
- 2016-2018: Philippe Zeller
- 2019-present: Élisabeth Beton-Delègue

== Sources ==
- Gellard, Matthieu (2014). Une Reine Épistolaire: Lettres et Pouvoir au Temps de Catherine de Médicis. Classiques Garnier.
