= Wladimir d'Ormesson =

French writer and diplomat (1888–1973)

Count Wladimir d'Ormesson
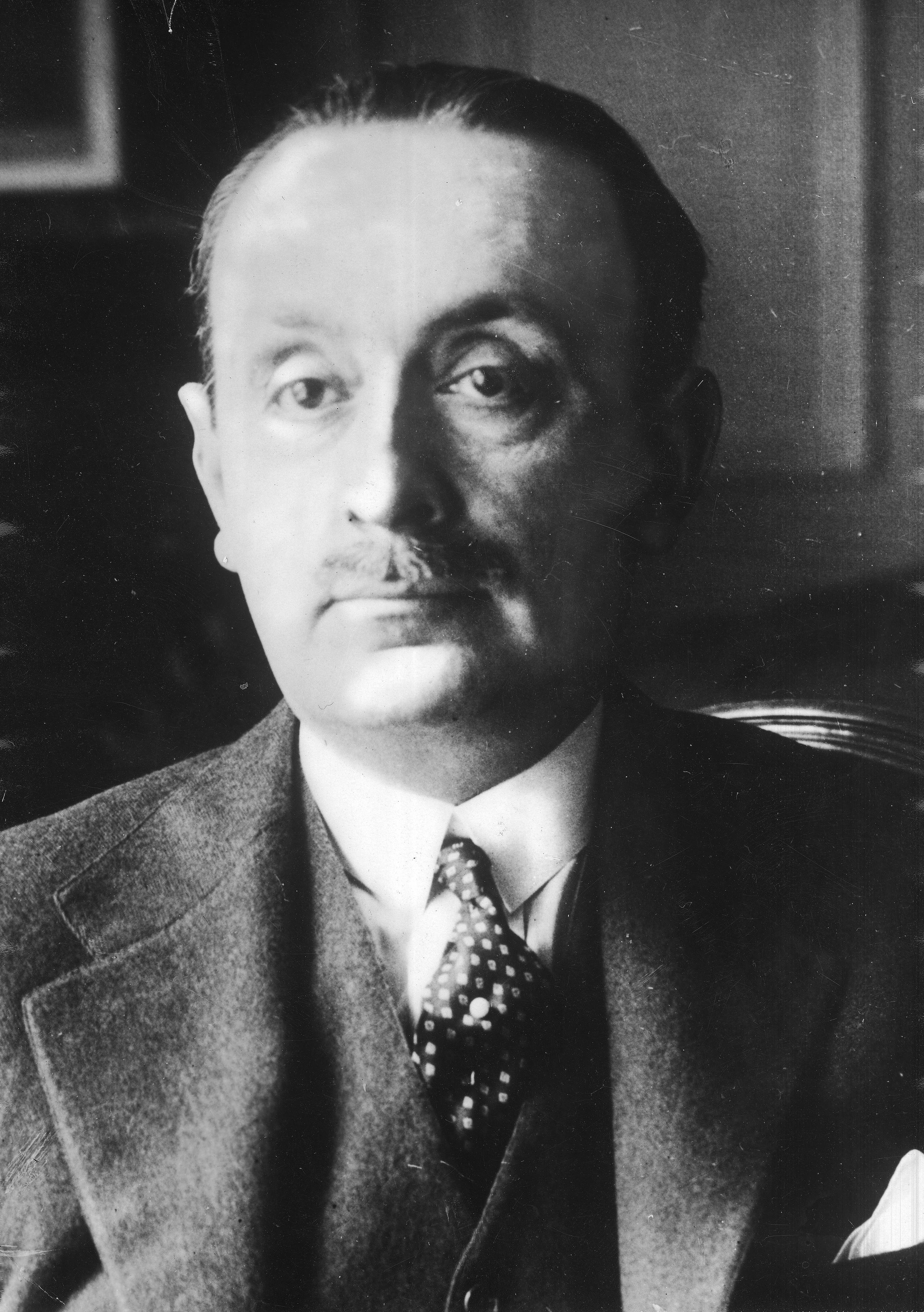
- d'Ormesson in 1931

Ambassador of France to the Holy See
- In office 1948–1956
- President: Vincent Auriol; René Coty
- Preceded by: Jacques Maritain
- Succeeded by: Roland de Margerie
- In office 1940–1940
- President: Albert Lebrun
- Preceded by: François Charles-Roux
- Succeeded by: Léon Bérard

Ambassador of France to Argentina
- In office 1945–1948
- President: List of presidents: Charles de Gaulle; Félix Gouin; Georges Bidault; Vincent Auriol; Léon Blum; Vincent Auriol
- Succeeded by: Guillaume Georges-Picot

Personal details
- Born: Wladimir Lefèvre d'Ormesson; August 2, 1888 Saint Petersburg, Russian Empire
- Died: September 15, 1973 (aged 85) Ormesson-sur-Marne, Val-de-Marne, France
- Relatives: Jean d'Ormesson (nephew)
- Education: École libre des sciences politiques
- Occupation: Journalist, essayist, novelist, diplomat
- Awards: Académie Française (seat 13)

Count Wladimir Lefèvre d'Ormesson (2 August 1888 – 15 September 1973) was a French journalist, essayist, novelist and diplomat.

== Biography ==
Wladimir d'Ormesson was born in Saint Petersburg, Russia, where his father, Count Olivier d'Ormesson, served as a diplomat. He was the uncle of Jean d'Ormesson, also a writer who, like himself, would be elected a member of the Académie Française. Until the age of twenty, d'Ormesson spent the majority of his life travelling due to his father's diplomatic postings; during this time, he lived in Copenhagen, Athens and Brussels. He studied economy at the École libre des sciences politiques in 1905, but did not graduate; during this time he had already developed an interest in literature, and published a book of verse while a student.

During World War I, d'Ormesson was mobilized into the French auxiliary service and later volunteered in the French Army. He was seriously wounded in Altkirch in 1916, and later served as an orderly officer under Marshal Hubert Lyautey in Morocco. He would describe his service under Marshal Lyautey in the memoir Auprès de Lyautey in 1963.

After the war, d'Ormesson pursued a journalistic career. He wrote articles on foreign policy for La Revue hebdomadaire from 1922, which drew the attention of former President Raymond Poincaré. On Poincaré's recommendation, he started working for the Swiss daily Le Temps in 1924. d'Ormesson also worked for Le Journal de Genève and La Revue des deux Mondes. From 1934 he served on the editorial board of Le Figaro, while continuing to write for numerous other newspapers. In 1938, he succeeded Georges Goyau as president of the Corporation of Christian Publicists (Corporation des publicistes chrétiens).

d'Ormesson's career as a diplomat began in May 1940, when he was named French ambassador to the Holy See by Prime Minister Paul Reynaud. He only served in this position for a few months, until he was recalled by the Vichy government of Marshal Philippe Pétain. On returning to France he settled in Lyon in the free zone, where the editorial of Le Figaro was now based, and once again took up work for the newspaper. When the free zone in southern France was occupied by Nazi Germany in November 1942, he was condemned to death in absentia by a court of the Milice; d'Ormesson spend the rest of World War II in hiding, and did not resurface in public life until after the liberation of France.

After the liberation, d'Ormesson was named ambassador of France to Argentina by Prime Minister Charles de Gaulle in 1945; from 1946, he also represented France in Chile. In 1948 he was once again named ambassador to the Holy See, and would remain as such until 1956. In 1956 he was also elected a member of the Académie Française, replacing Paul Claudel on seat 13. From 1964, he was president of the Office de Radiodiffusion Télévision Française, the French national broadcasting agency.

Aside from his journalistic and diplomatic career, d'Ormesson was also a prolific writer: he wrote many essays (Dans la nuit européenne, La Confiance de l'Allemagne) and some novels (La Préface d'une vie). He died at Ormesson Castle in Ormesson-sur-Marne, Val-de-Marne, where he is also buried.

== Bibliography ==
- Les Jets d'eau, 1913
- La Préface d'une vie, 1919
- Nos illusions sur l'Europe centrale, 1922
- "La Question de Tanger", Revue de Paris, 1922
- Dans la nuit européenne, 1923
- Les résultats de la politique de la Ruhr, 1924
- Portraits d'hier et d'aujourd'hui, 1927
- La Première Mission de la France aux États-Unis, 1928
- La Confiance de l'Allemagne ?, 1929
- Enfances diplomatique, souvenirs, 1931
- La Grande Crise mondiale de 1857, 1932
- La Révolution allemande, 1934
- Qu'est-ce qu'un Français ?, 1935
- Vue cavalière de l'Europe, 1936
- L'Éternel Problème allemand, 1945
- La Ville éternelle, 1956
- Mission à Rome, 1957
- La Ville et les Champs, 1958
- La Papauté, 1958
- Les vraies confidences, 1962
- Auprès de Lyautey, 1963
- Présence du Général de Gaulle, 1971
- Les Propos, 1973
