= Arnaud du Ferrier =

French lawyer and diplomat (d. 1585)

Arnaud Du Ferrier (c. 1508 – 1585) was a French lawyer and diplomat.

He was born at Toulouse and practised as a lawyer first at Bourges, afterwards at Toulouse. Councillor to the parlement of the latter town, and then to that of Rennes, he later became president of the parlement of Paris. He represented King Charles IX at the Council of Trent in 1562, but had to retire in consequence of the attitude he had adopted, and was sent as ambassador to Venice, where he remained till 1567, returning again in 1570.

On his return to France he came into touch with the Calvinists, to whose beliefs he was sympathetic, and consequently lost his place in the privy council and part of his fortune. As compensation, Henry of Navarre appointed him his chancellor.
