= Vallée d'Aure =

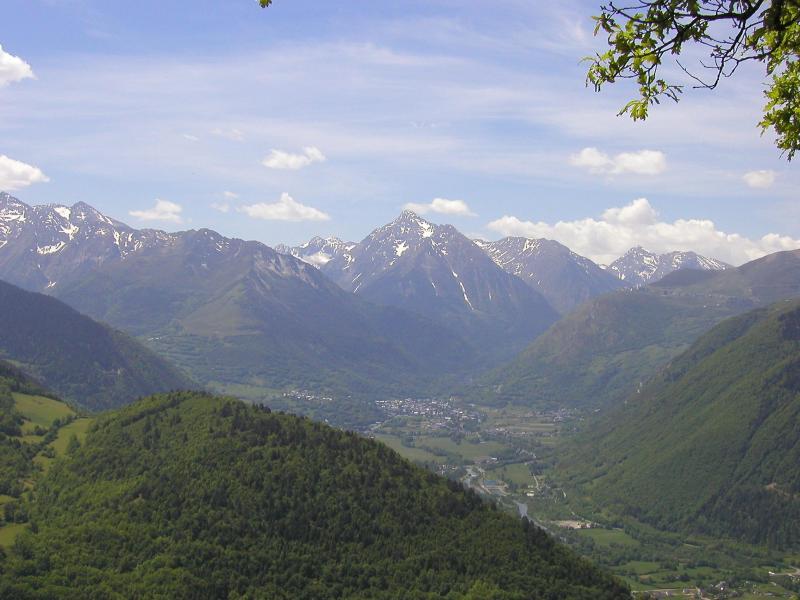
- Length: 40 km (25 mi) North

Geology
- Type: Vallée glaciaire

Geography
- Location: Hautes-Pyrénées, Midi-Pyrénées, France
- Population centers: Sarrancolin, Arreau, Ancizan, Guchen, Grézian, Cadéac, Vielle-Aure, Saint-Lary-Soulan, Aragnouet
- Coordinates: 42.8300°N 0.3300°E
- Mountain range: Pyrénées
- Traversed by: Neste
- Interactive map of Vallée d'Aure

The vallée d'Aure is located in the French Pyrenees, in the Hautes-Pyrénées department, in the region of Midi-Pyrénées.

== Geography ==
The vallée d'Aure is part of the pays d'Aure, of which the historical capital is Arreau.

It corresponds to the upper flow of the Neste or Neste d'Aure. It spans about 40 km from Sarrancolin to the Spanish border, accessible by the Aragnouet-Bielsa tunnel.

- Vallée d'Aure lakes

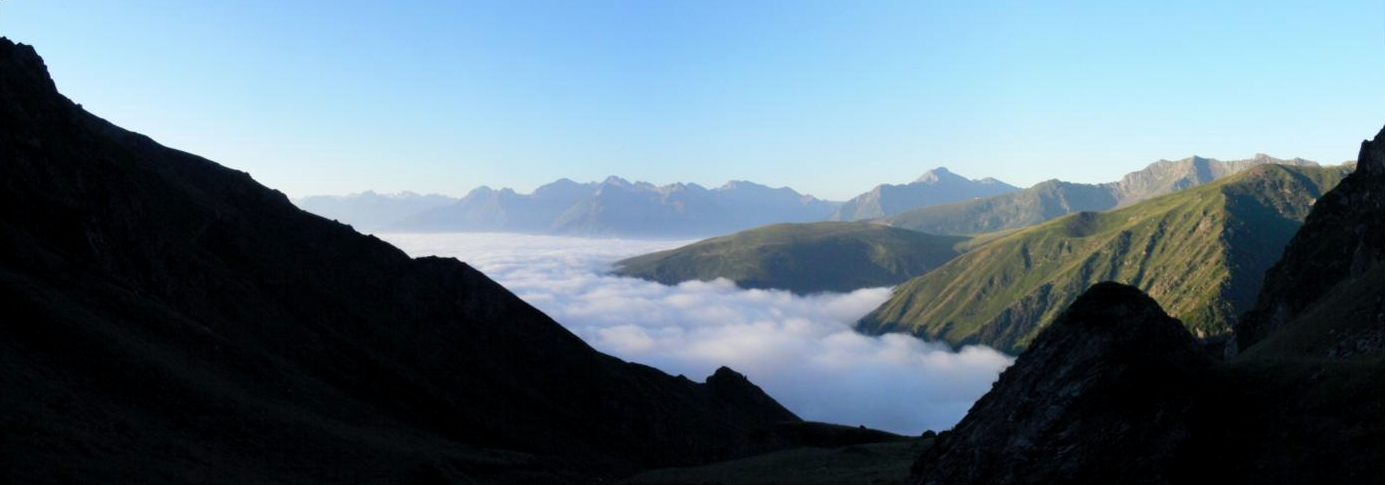
the vallée d'Aure under a sea of clouds

=== Main communes ===
- Arreau
- Gouaux
- Sarrancolin
- Bourisp
- Ancizan
- Guchen
- Guchan
- Grézian
- Cadéac
- Cadeilhan-Trachère
- Lançon
- Camparan
- Grailhen
- Bazus-Aure
- Barrancoueu
- Vignec
- Sailhan
- Estensan
- Azet
- Beyrède-Jumet
- Ilhet
- Vielle-Aure
- Saint-Lary-Soulan
- Tramezaïgues
- Aragnouet and the hamlets of Eget, Fabian, Le Plan
- Aspin-Aure
- Pailhac
- Jézeau

=== Mineralogy ===
The vallée d'Are has the particularity of disposing of remarkable mineral deposits such as byssolite, tremolite or prehnite.

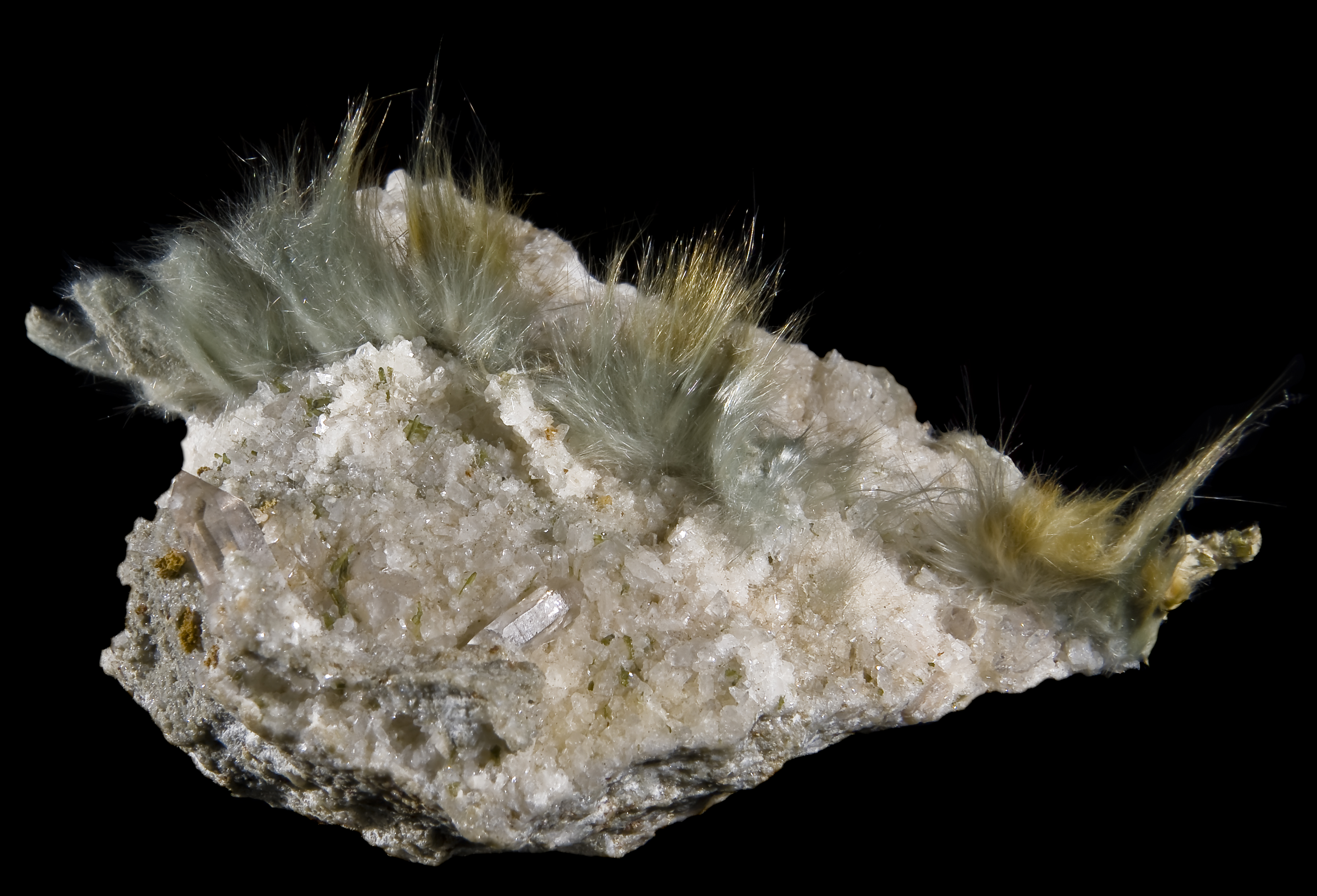
Byssolite

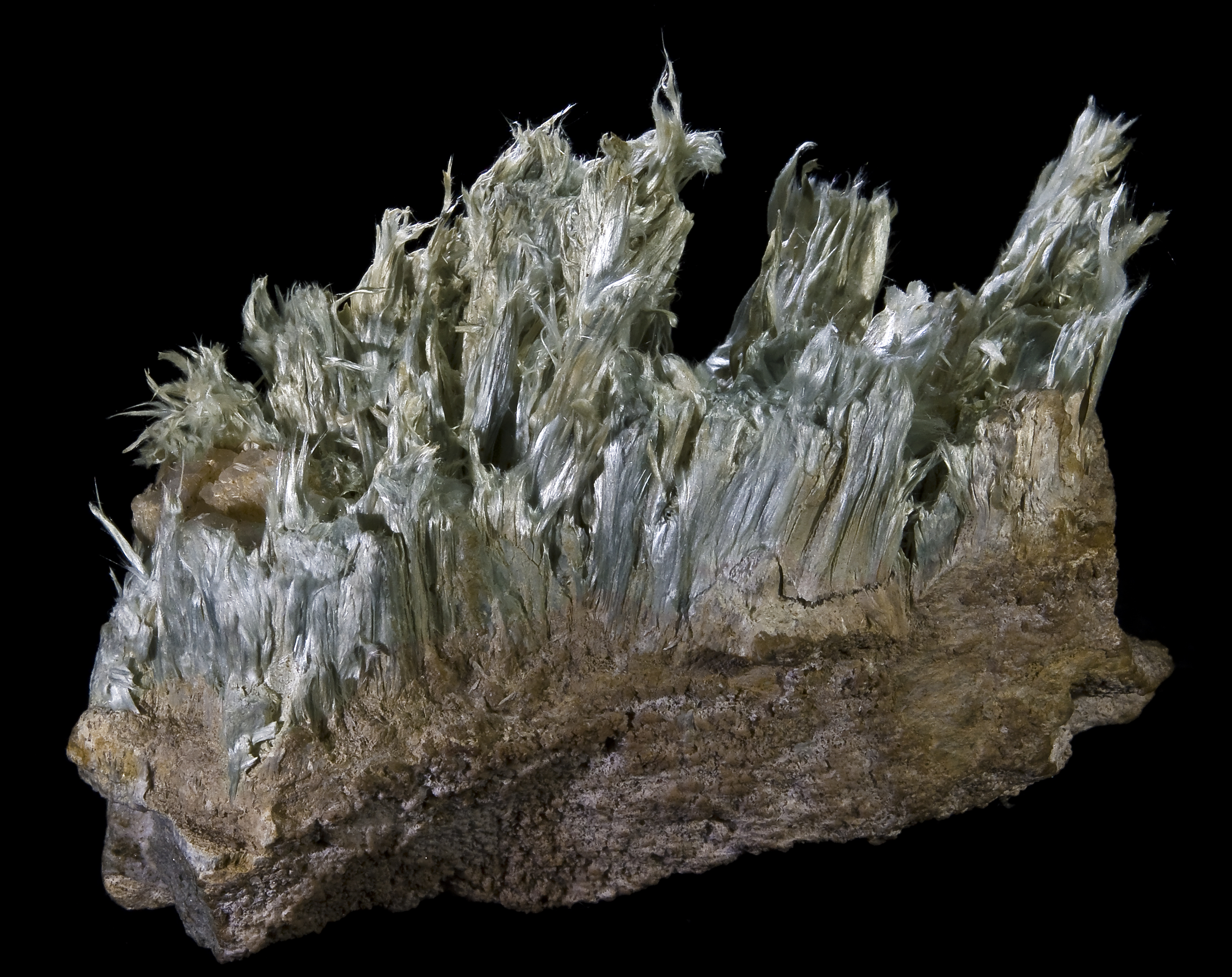
Tremolite

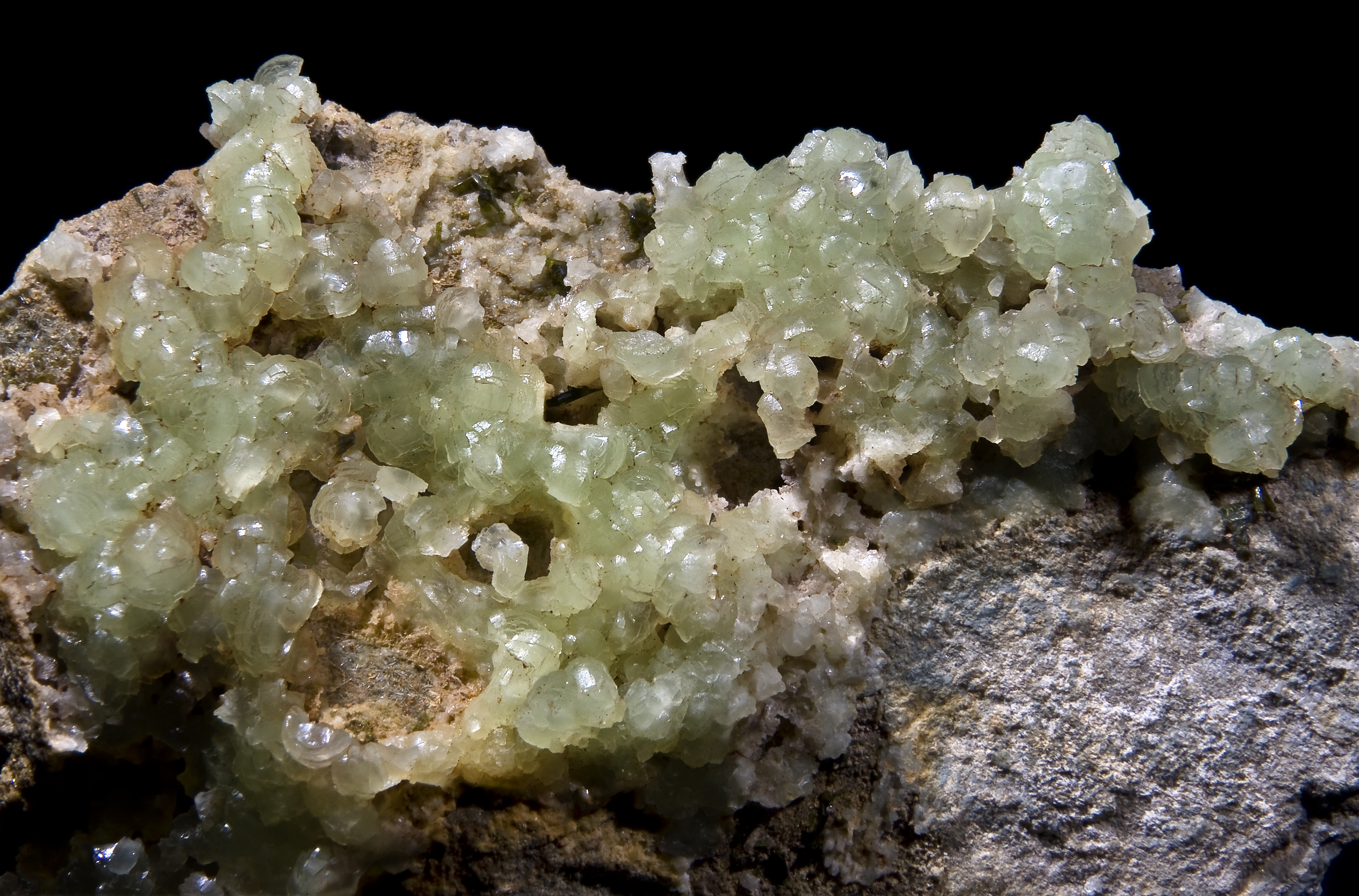
Prehnite

== Flora and fauna ==
The Aure et Saint-Girons ~ or Auroise ~ is a breed of cattle endemic to the valley.

== History ==
Chemin de la Vallée d'Aure

== Ski resorts ==
- Saint-Lary-Soulan
- Piau-Engaly
- Nistos (alpine and cross-country skiing)
