= Tramezaïgues =

- Commune
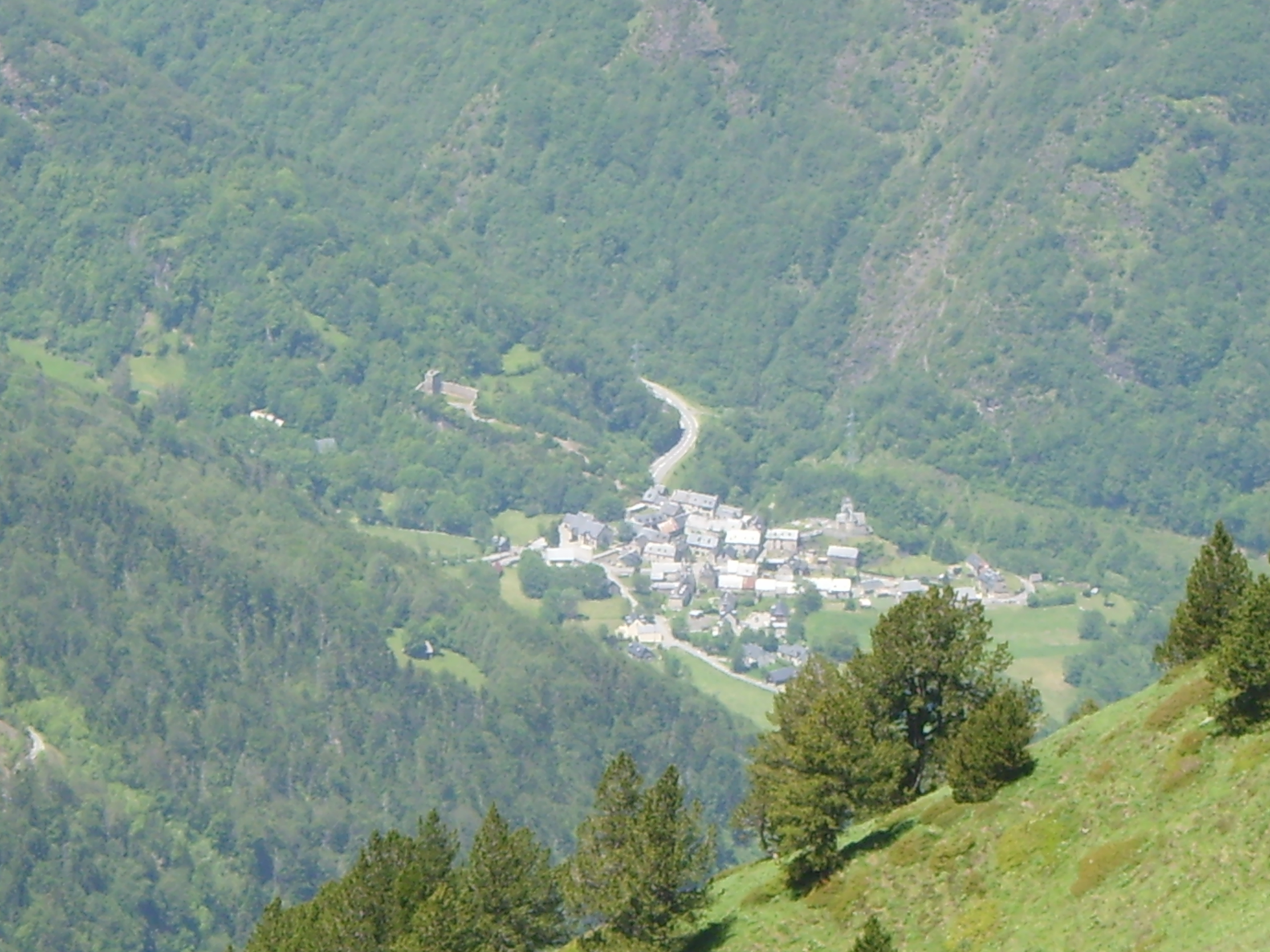
- Tramezaïgues village seen from the Cap de Laubère, at 2200 meters

- Coat of arms
- Location of Tramezaïgues
- Location within France Location within Occitanie
- Coordinates: 42°47′53″N 0°17′24″E
- Country: France
- Region: Occitania
- Department: Hautes-Pyrénées
- Arrondissement: Bagnères-de-Bigorre
- Canton: Neste, Aure et Louron

Government
  - Mayor (2020–2026): Didier Fourtine
- Area^{1}: 34.96 km^{2} (13.50 sq mi)
- Elevation: 950 m (3,120 ft)
- Highest elevation: 2,935 m (9,629 ft)
- Lowest elevation: 913 m (2,995 ft)
- Population (2023): 30
  - Density: 0.86/km^{2} (2.2/sq mi)
- Time zone: UTC+01:00 (CET)
  - Summer (DST): UTC+02:00 (CEST)
- INSEE/Postal code: 65450 /65170
- ^{1} French Land Register data, which excludes lakes, ponds, glaciers > 1 km^{2} (0.386 sq mi or 247 acres) and river estuaries.

Tramezaïgues (French pronunciation: [tʁamza.iɡ], official name) or Tramezaygues (local name) is a commune in the Hautes-Pyrénées department, in the Occitanie region of France.

== Geography ==
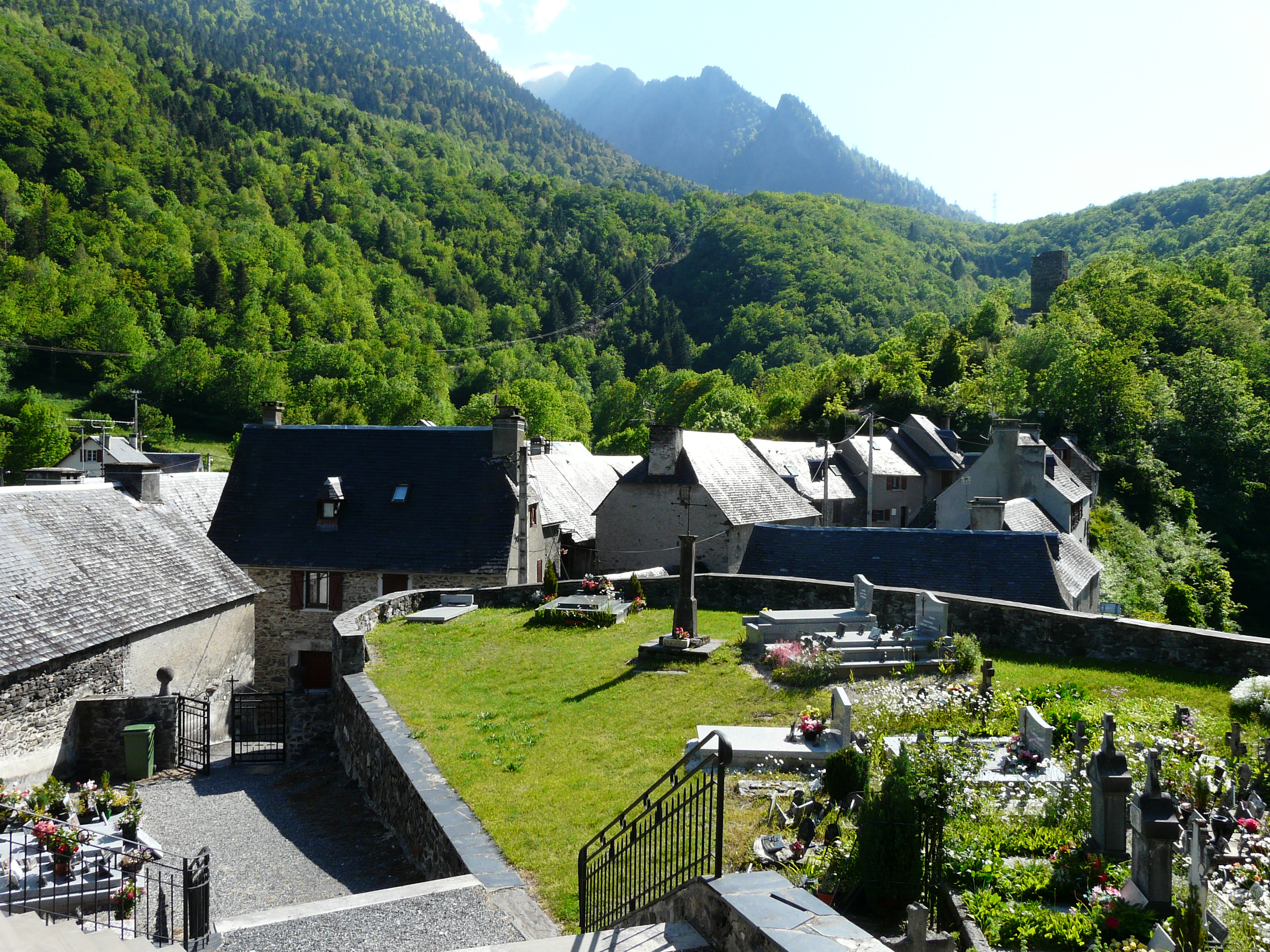
The village of Tramezaïgues, viewed from the church

The commune of Tramezaïgues, in the south of the Hautes-Pyrénées department, extends from the Aure Valley to the Spanish border.

The village is located at the foot of Pic de Tramezaïgues 2,548 m (8,360 ft), and at the confluence of the Neste d'Aure and the Neste de Rioumajou. The name of Tramezaïgues is derived from the Latin description: inter ambas aquas (between two waters).

To the north of the village is the Pla d'Adet ski resort, and Aragnouet is to the west. East of the village is Loudenvielle and the Col de Val Louron-Azet. Cadeilhan-Trachère and Saint-Lary-Soulan are situated to the north-east. The Spanish border is to the south of the village.

== History ==
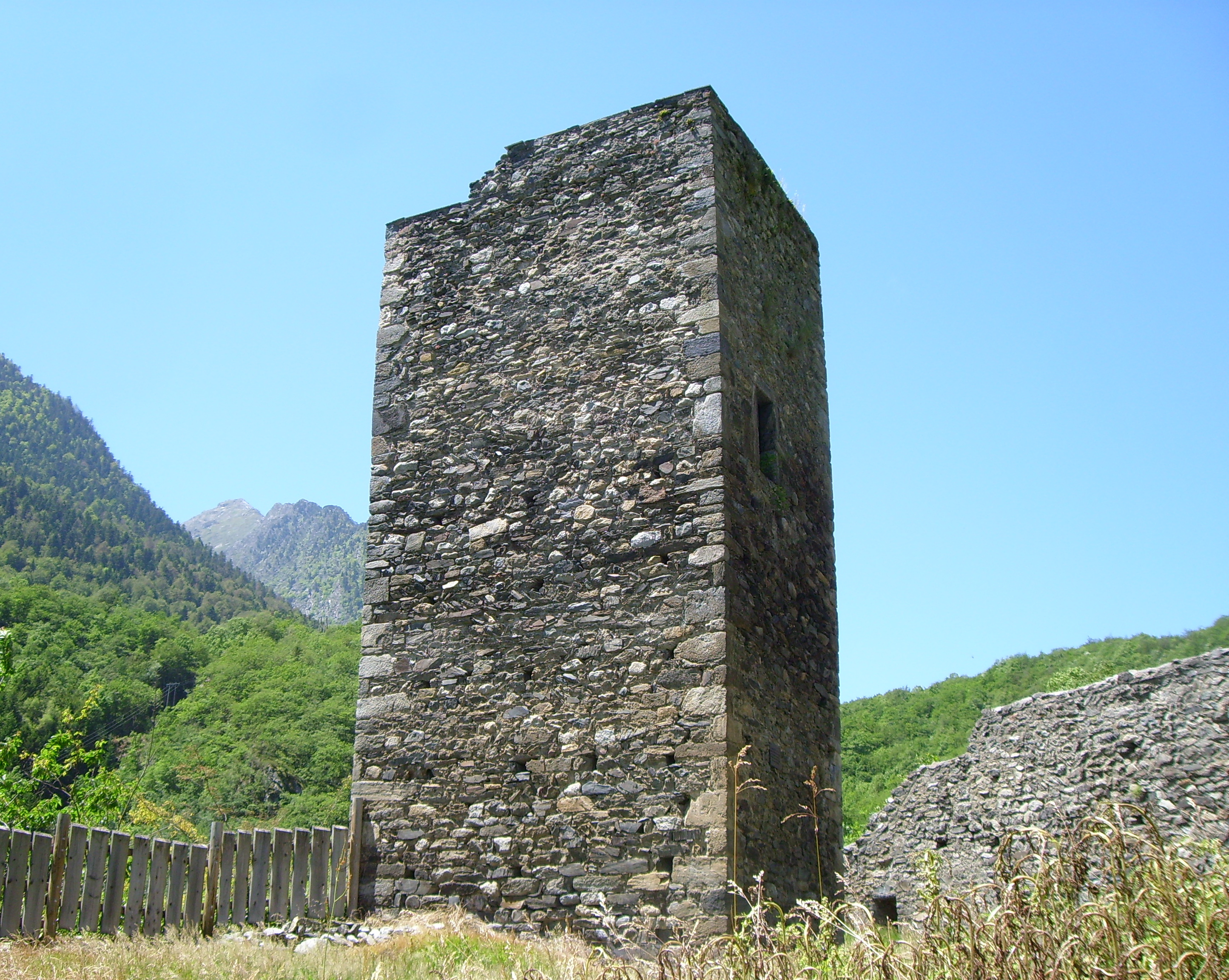
The castle tower, overlooking the village

The Château de Tramezaygues has been existent since the 12th century. The château was a position for monitoring the Spanish border until the French Revolution.

=== Sites and monuments ===
- The ruins of the 12th Century Château de Tramezaygues, restored in 1990 is a listed historic monument since 1980.
- The Saint-Denis Saint-Nicolas Church, of which survives the original apse of Romanesque style. The rest of the church was modified during the 16th, 17th and 19th centuries.

== Politics and administration ==
List of successive mayors
Period	Name
March 2001 - 2014	Gérard Palasset
2014 - current	Didier Fourtine

== Demographics ==
In 2017, the commune had 34 inhabitants.

== Gallery ==
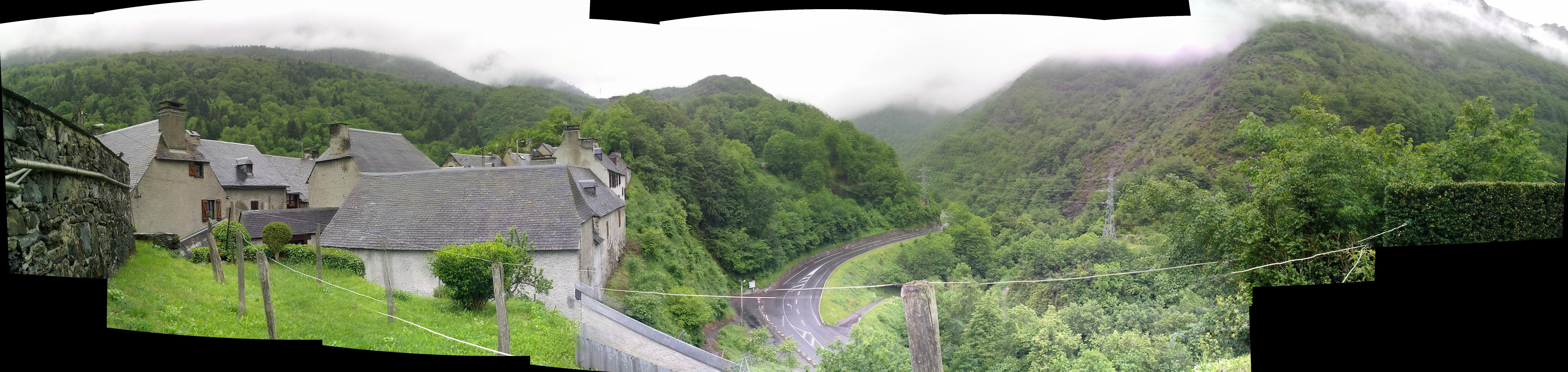
Panorama from Tramezaïgues Valley

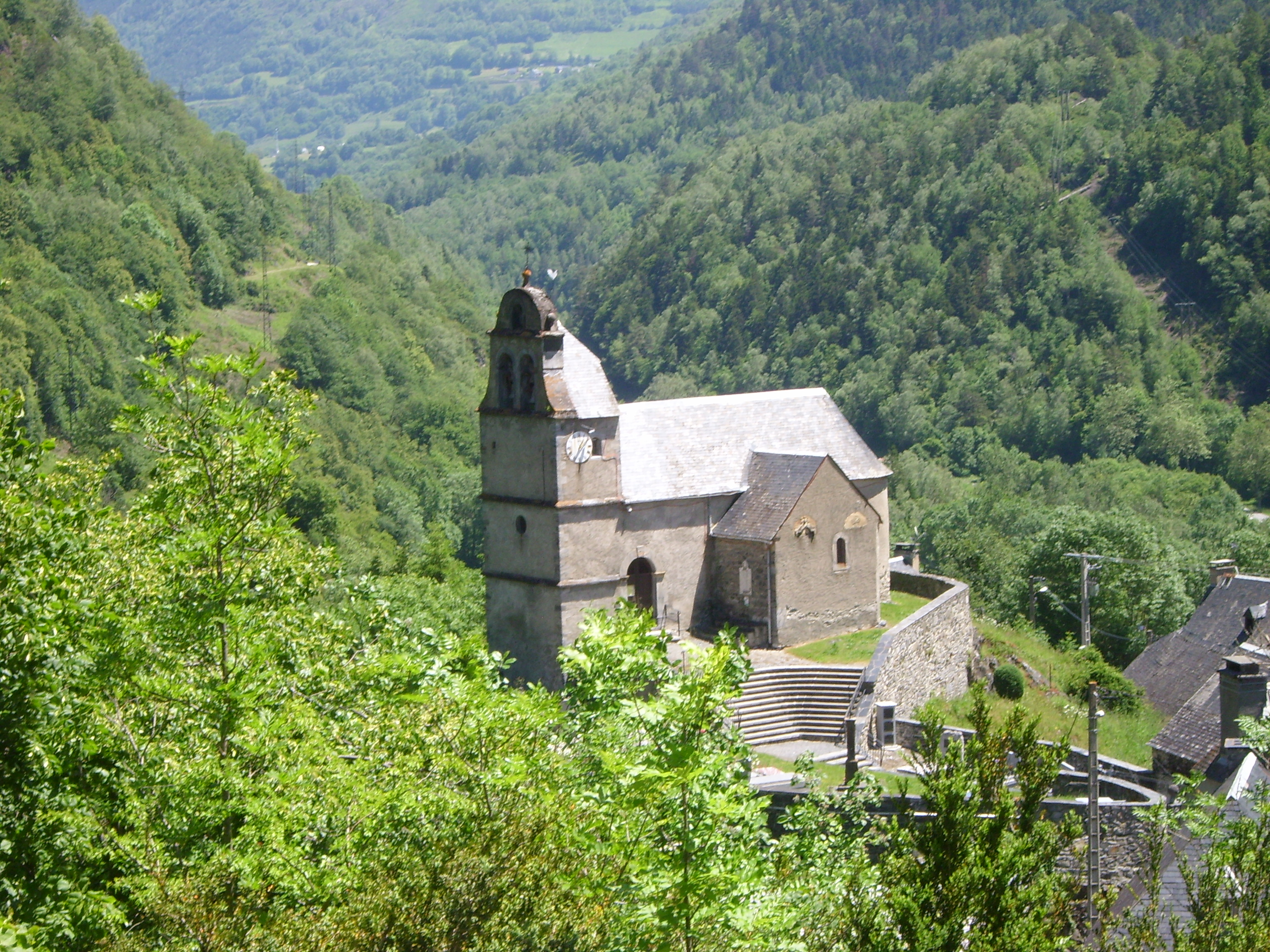
The church of Tramezaïgues

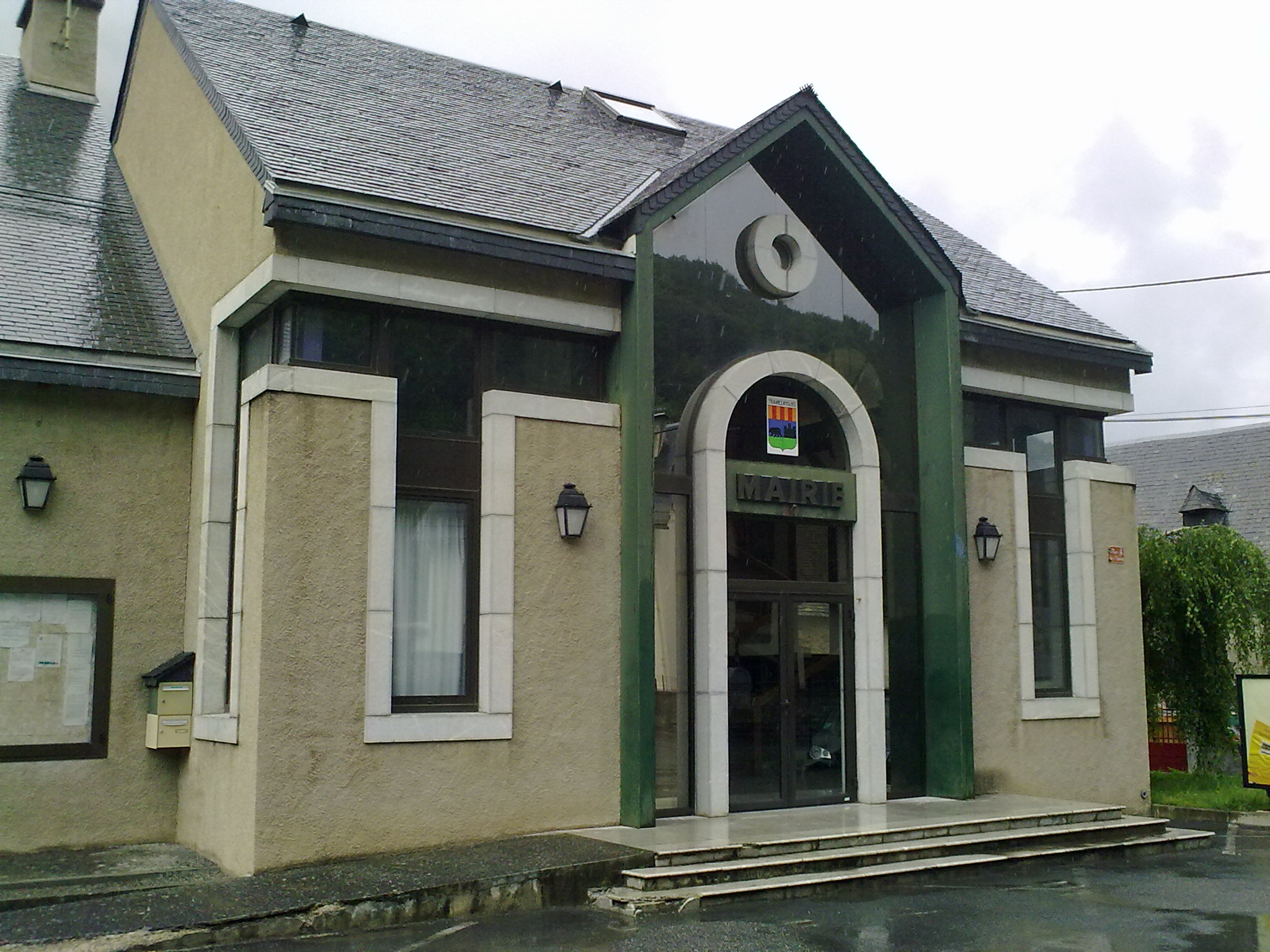
The town hall

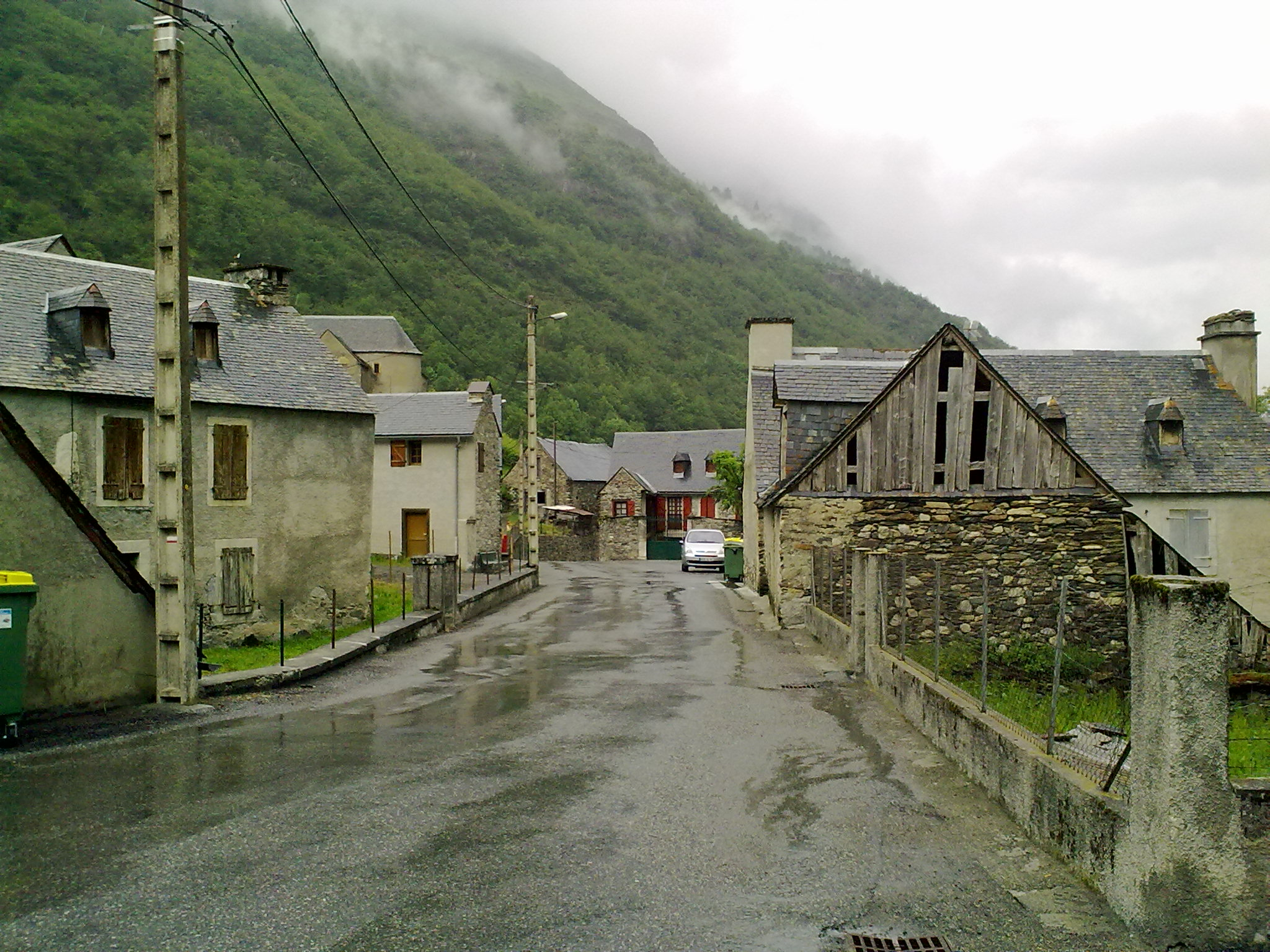
The narrow streets of the village of Tramezaïgues

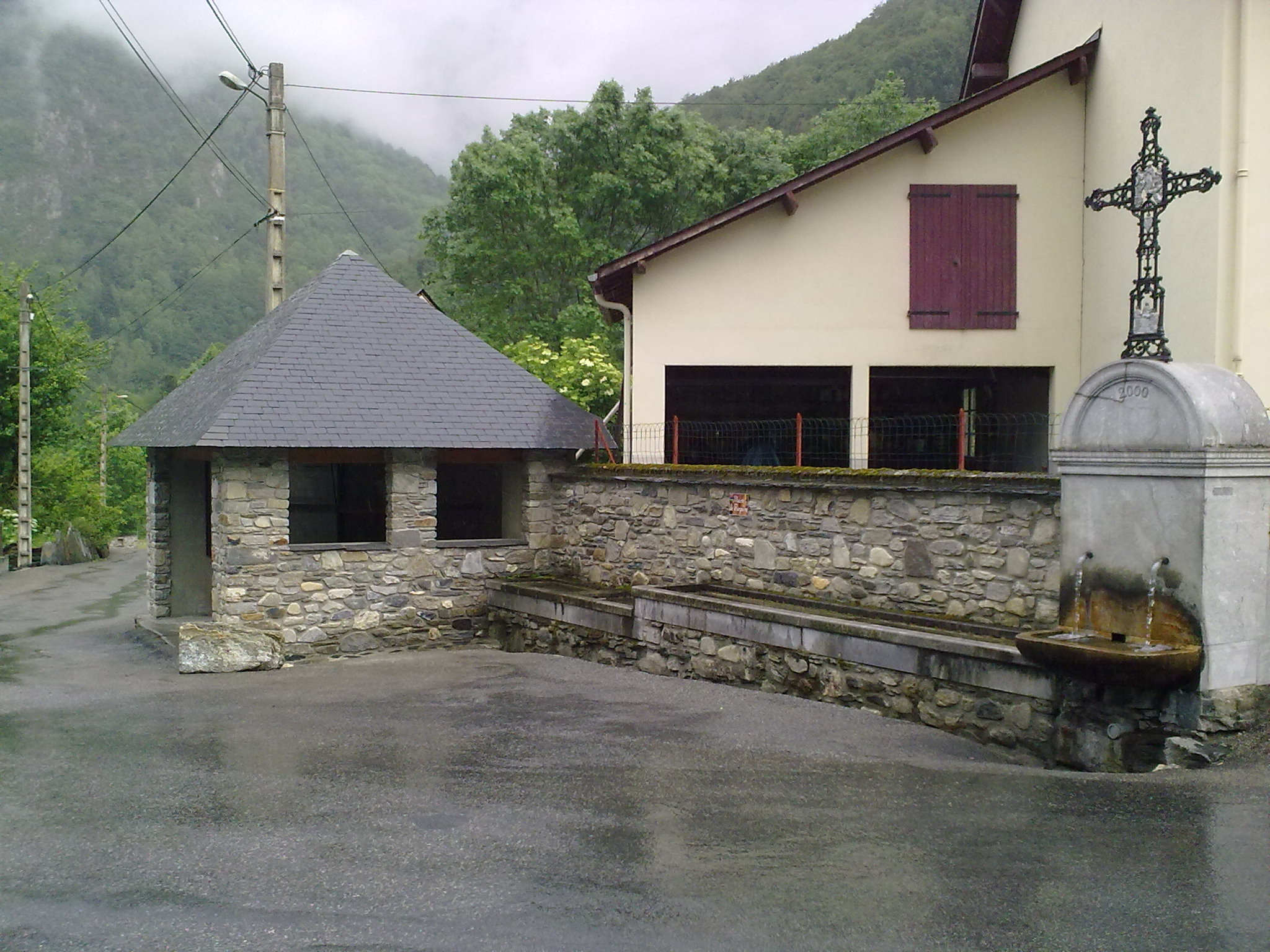
The fountain of the village

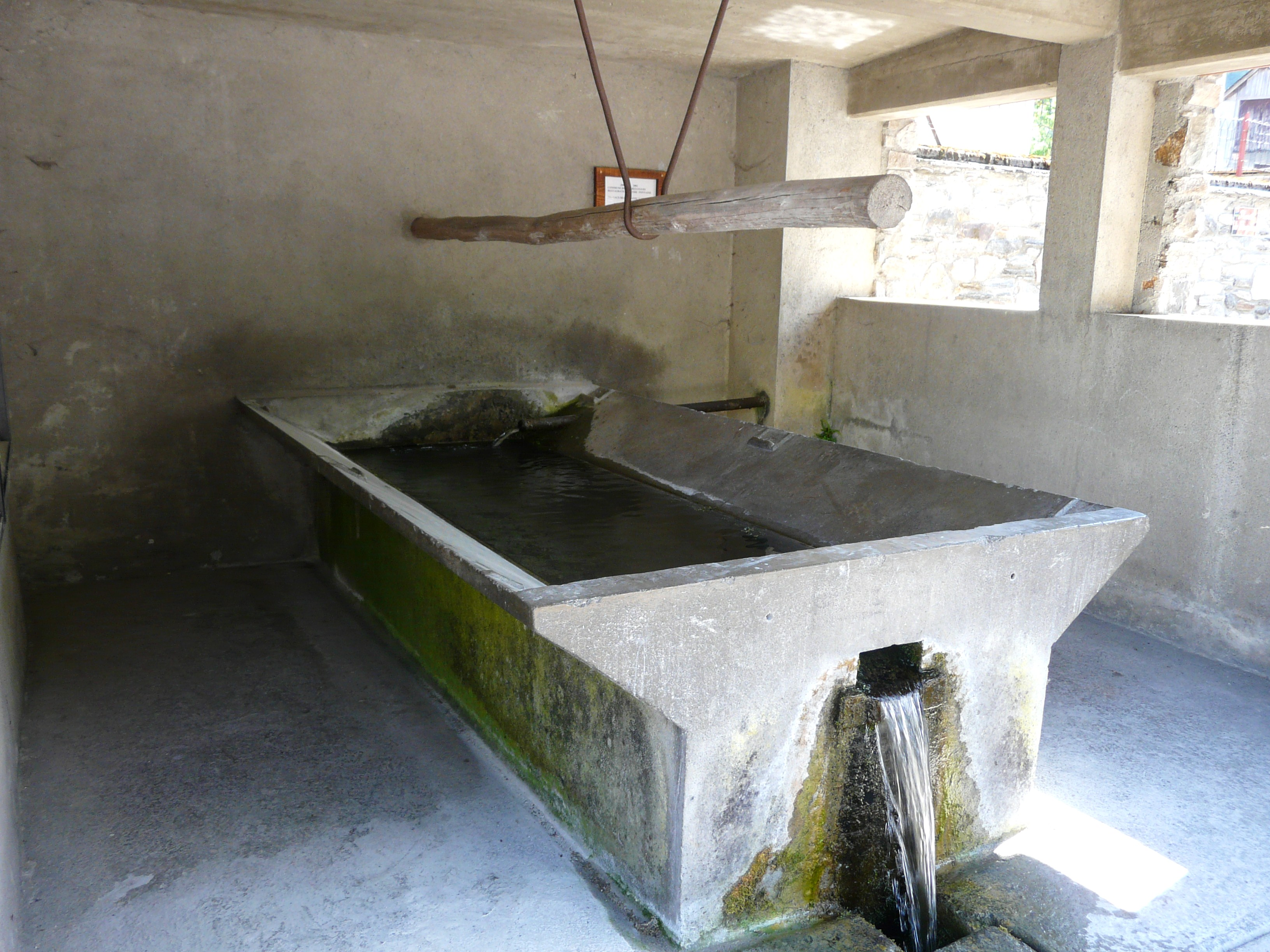
The village wash-house

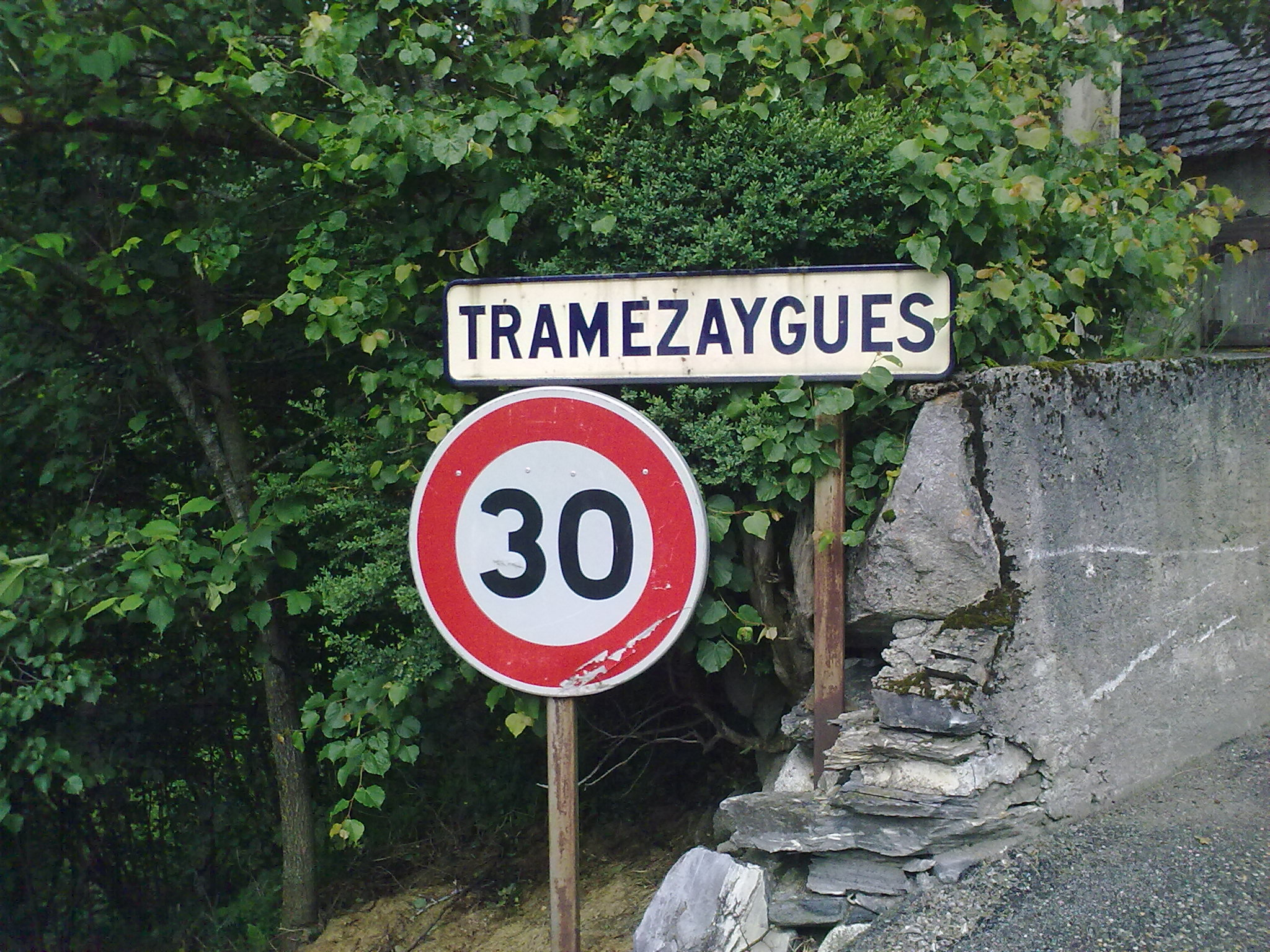
A village entry sign

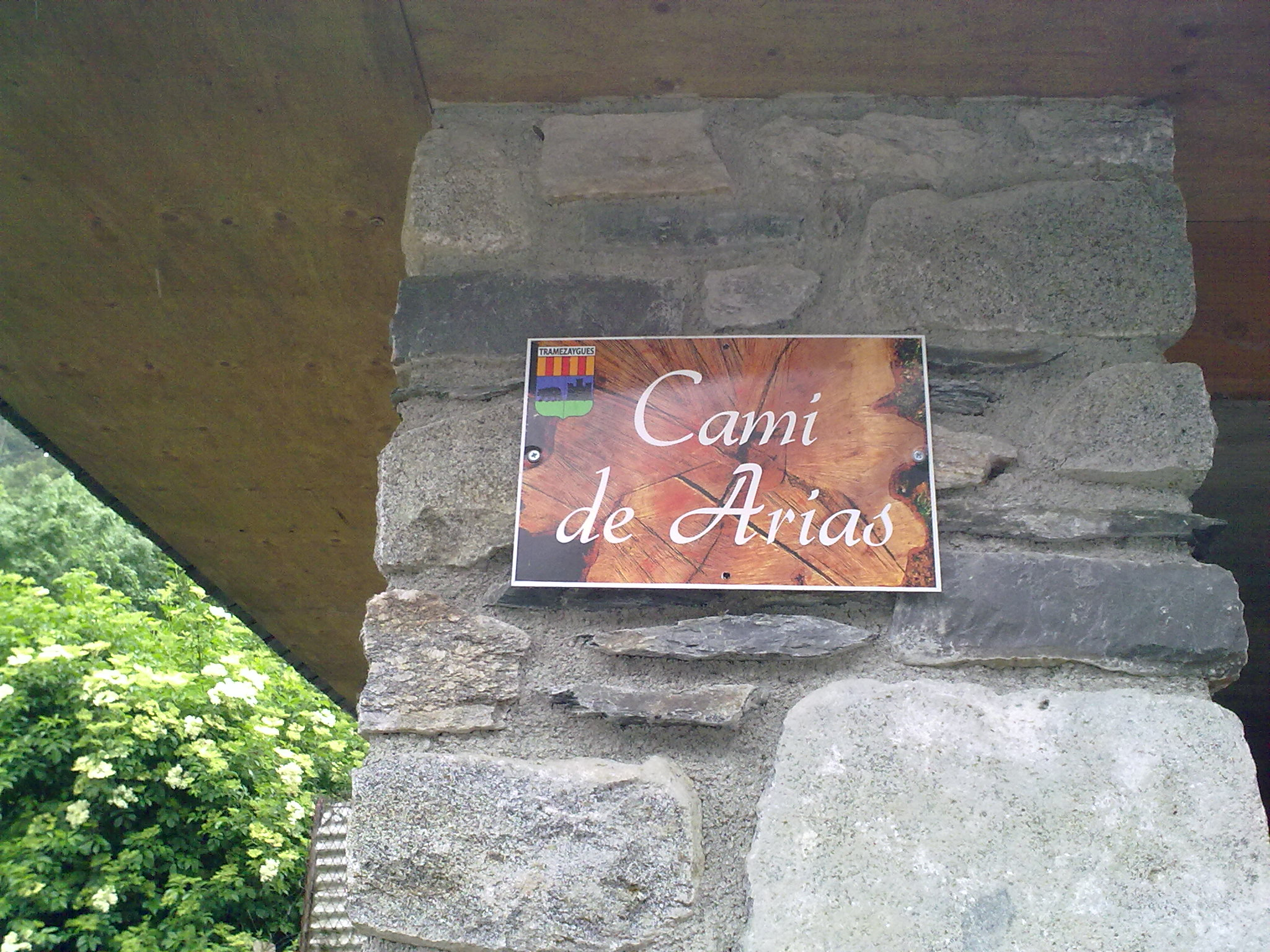
Street sign in the village

== See also ==
- Communes of the Hautes-Pyrénées department
