= Piau-Engaly =

Winter sports resort in the French Pyrenees

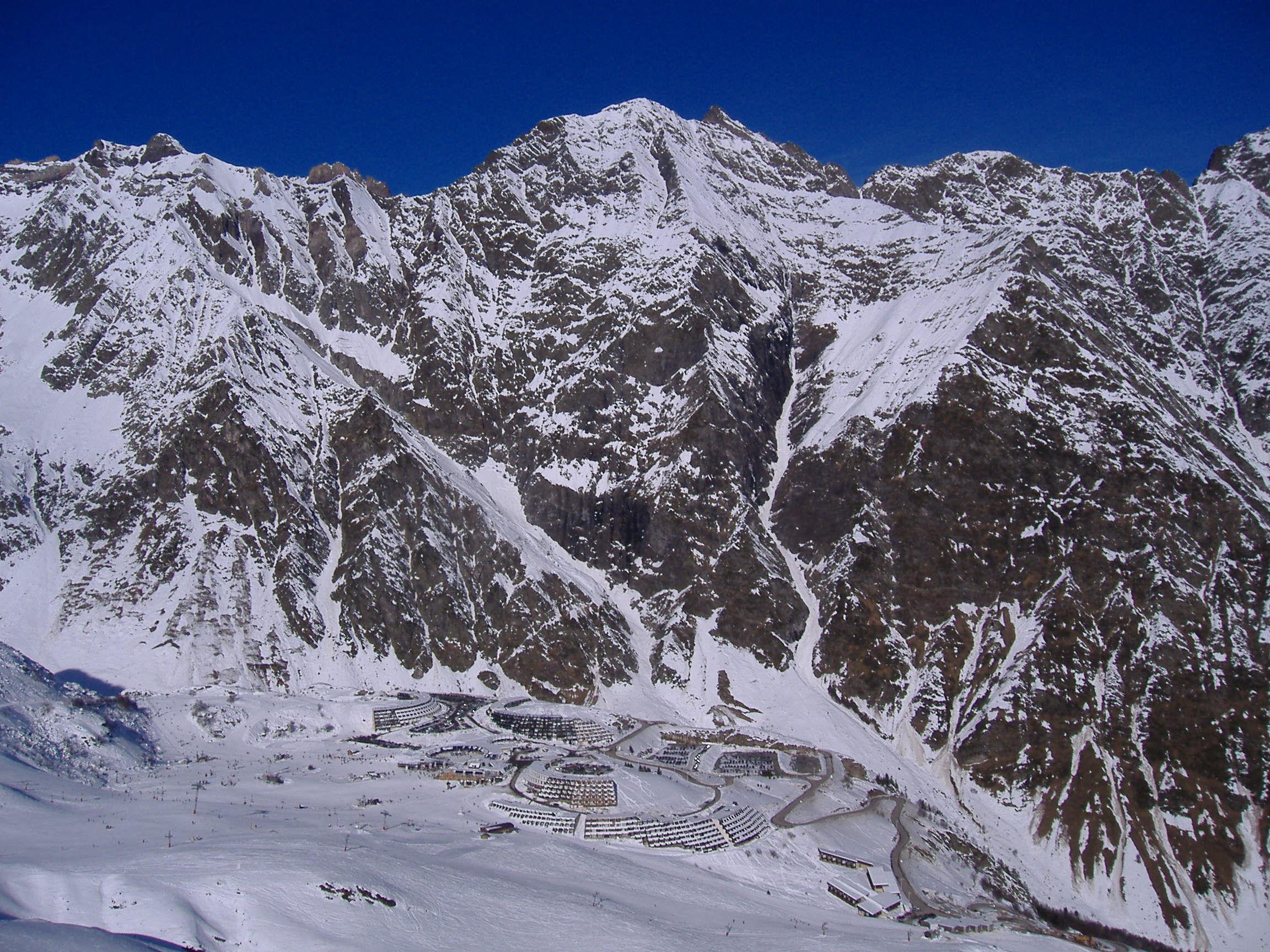
- The resort of Piau-Engaly, seen from the south

- Location within France Location within Occitanie Location within Pyrenees
- Location: Aragnouet, Hautes-Pyrénées, Occitania, France
- Nearest city: Pau
- Coordinates: 42°47′02″N 0°09′30″E
- Opened: 1971
- Top elevation: 2,600 m (8,500 ft)
- Base elevation: 1,400 m (4,600 ft)
- Total length: 65 km (40 mi)
- Lift system: Yes
- Snowmaking: Yes
- Website: www.piau-engaly.com

Piau-Engaly is a winter sports resort in the French Pyrenees, located in the commune of Aragnouet, in the Hautes-Pyrénées department and the Occitania region. At between 1,400 and 2,600 m (4,600 and 8,500 ft) altitude, with its centre located at an altitude of 1,860 m (6,100 ft), Piau-Engaly is the highest resort in the French Pyrenees.

== Geography ==
Piau-Engaly is located in a large cirque, at the top of the Vallée d'Aure, in the French Pyrenees. The valley includes the commune of Aragnouet, its various hamlets and the Néouvielle Nature Reserve. The resort is about 5 km (3.1 mi) from the France–Spain border and close to the Aragnouet-Bielsa Tunnel.

== History ==
The creation of the ski resort was planned from 1967 by the commune of Aragnouet. The first chairlift was built in 1969, which was followed by a pair of ski lifts and the access road. The resort opened in 1971, but the access road wasn't finished for a further two years. The resort's accommodation was built between 1975 and 1985. The resort was restructured from 2003 onwards, with a chairlift and additional skiing routes. A snowpark opened in 2007 and the resort joined the N'PY group of ski resorts. An aquatic centre was planned to open in 2012.

== Architecture ==
The development project for the resort dates back to the 1960s. Construction took place between 1979 and 1985. The Bordeaux architect Jean Marc Vialle, in association with Philippe Sanchez, was the project manager. The core of the resort has several arc-shaped residential buildings, adapted to the uneven nature of the terrain. The main facades are mostly south-facing. The inclination allows the terrace of each apartment to benefit from available sunlight. Shops, services and access to the slopes are grouped together in a partly underground circular complex in the centre of the resort, at an altitude of 1,860 m (6,100 ft). The architecture of the resort is unique and is designed to blend in with the natural landscape that surrounds it. The surrounding peaks, culminating at 3,000 m (9,800 ft), make the environment striking. In 2018, the architectural firm of Jean Michel Wilmotte was asked to participate in the renovation and construction of new accommodation. As part of the "Natura Piau" project, a four-star tourist residence was designed to fit in with the existing architecture.

== Facilities ==
The resort is the highest in the French Pyrenees, with downhill skiing between 1,420 and 2,600 m (4,660 and 8,530 ft) above sea level. 65 km (40 mi) of routes are available, catering for beginners to expert skiers. The resort has eleven ski lifts including two detachable chairlifts, six detachable teleskis, a telerope and comprehensive low-pressure snowmaking machines. The resort has a snowpark adapted to all levels of ability and allows for snowshoeing, dog sledding, snowtubing and tobogganing. A balneotherapy spa and a motorhome area are also present.

== Events ==
=== The Pyrenees Derby ===
The Pyrenees Derby, a sliding race, takes place every year in March at the resort. The principle is to descend as quickly as possible from the highest point of the resort to the lowest point, individually or as a team. Each participant chooses his or her route and discipline.

=== Tour de France ===
Stage 15 of the 1999 Tour de France finished at the resort. The climb to Piau-Engaly was 7 km (4.3 mi) long, to an altitude of 1,865 m (6,119 ft), and at an average gradient of 7.3%. The stage was won by Fernando Escartín.
