= Vielle-Aure =

- Commune
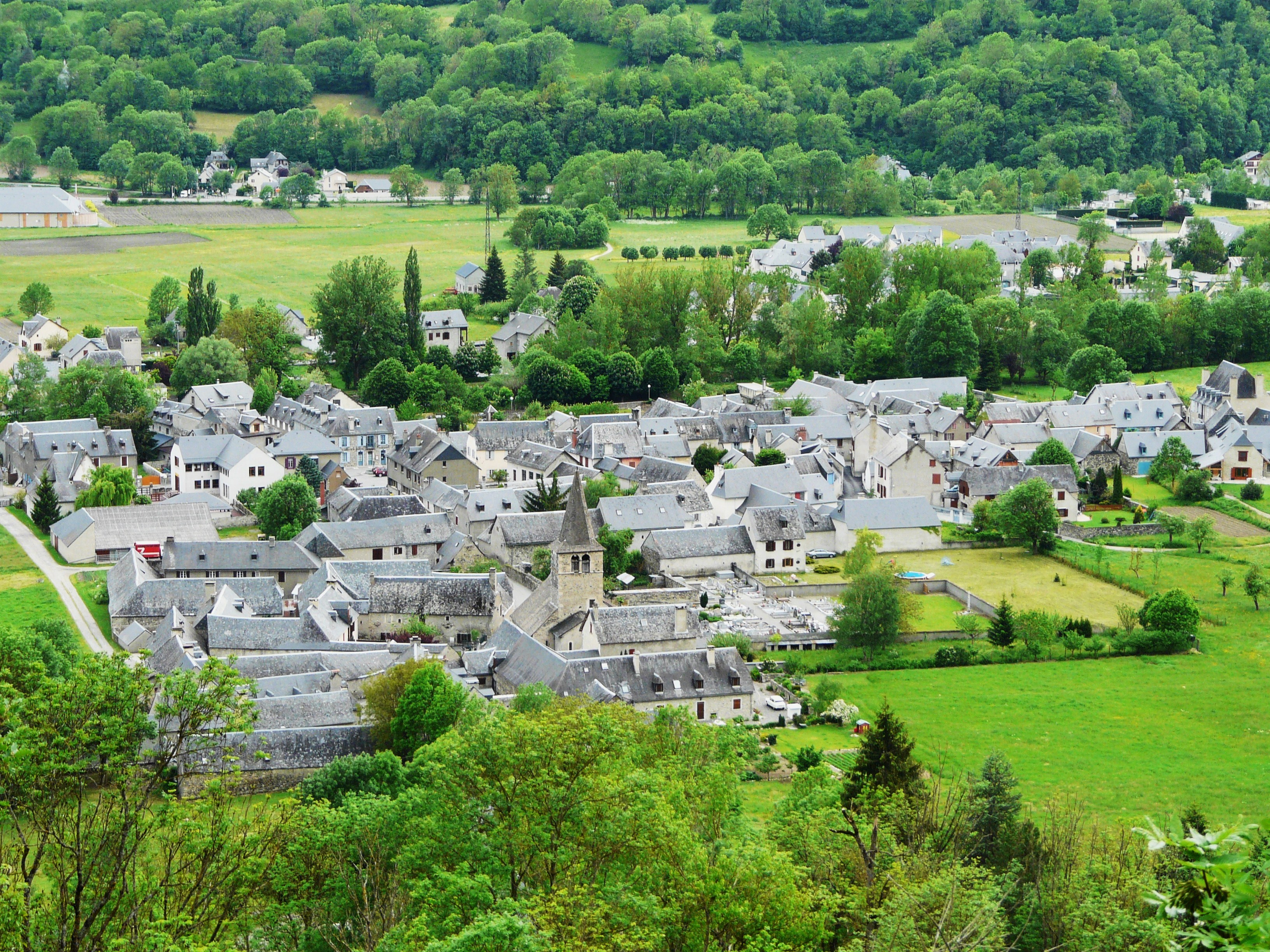
- The village of Vielle-Aure

- Coat of arms
- Location of Vielle-Aure
- Location within France Location within Occitanie
- Coordinates: 42°49′51″N 0°19′36″E
- Country: France
- Region: Occitania
- Department: Hautes-Pyrénées
- Arrondissement: Bagnères-de-Bigorre
- Canton: Neste, Aure et Louron
- Intercommunality: Aure-Louron

Government
  - Mayor (2020–2026): Maryse Beyrié
- Area^{1}: 5.38 km^{2} (2.08 sq mi)
- Elevation: 850 m (2,790 ft)
- Highest elevation: 3,092 m (10,144 ft)
- Lowest elevation: 773 m (2,536 ft)
- Population (2023): 315
  - Density: 58.6/km^{2} (152/sq mi)
- Time zone: UTC+01:00 (CET)
  - Summer (DST): UTC+02:00 (CEST)
- INSEE/Postal code: 65465 /65170
- ^{1} French Land Register data, which excludes lakes, ponds, glaciers > 1 km^{2} (0.386 sq mi or 247 acres) and river estuaries.

Vielle-Aure (French pronunciation: [vjɛl ɔʁ]; Occitan: Vièla) is a rural commune in the Hautes-Pyrénées department of the Occitanie region in south-western France.

Historically and culturally, the commune is in the Pays d'Aure, made up of the Neste valley (downstream from Sarrancolin), the Aure valley (upstream from Sarrancolin), and the Louron valley. Exposed to a mountain climate, it is drained by the Neste, the Saint-Jacques stream, and various other small streams. Included in the Pyrenees National Park, the commune has a remarkable natural heritage: two Natura 2000 sites (the "Néouvielle" and "Garonne, Ariège, Hers, Salat, Pique, and Neste"), a protected area (the Néouvielle national nature reserve) and eight natural areas of ecological, faunistic. and floristic interest.

Vielle-Aure had 304 inhabitants in 2022, after experiencing a strong population increase since 1968. Its inhabitants are called Viellaurois.

== See also ==
- Communes of the Hautes-Pyrénées department
