= Aure et Saint-Girons =

Breed of cattle

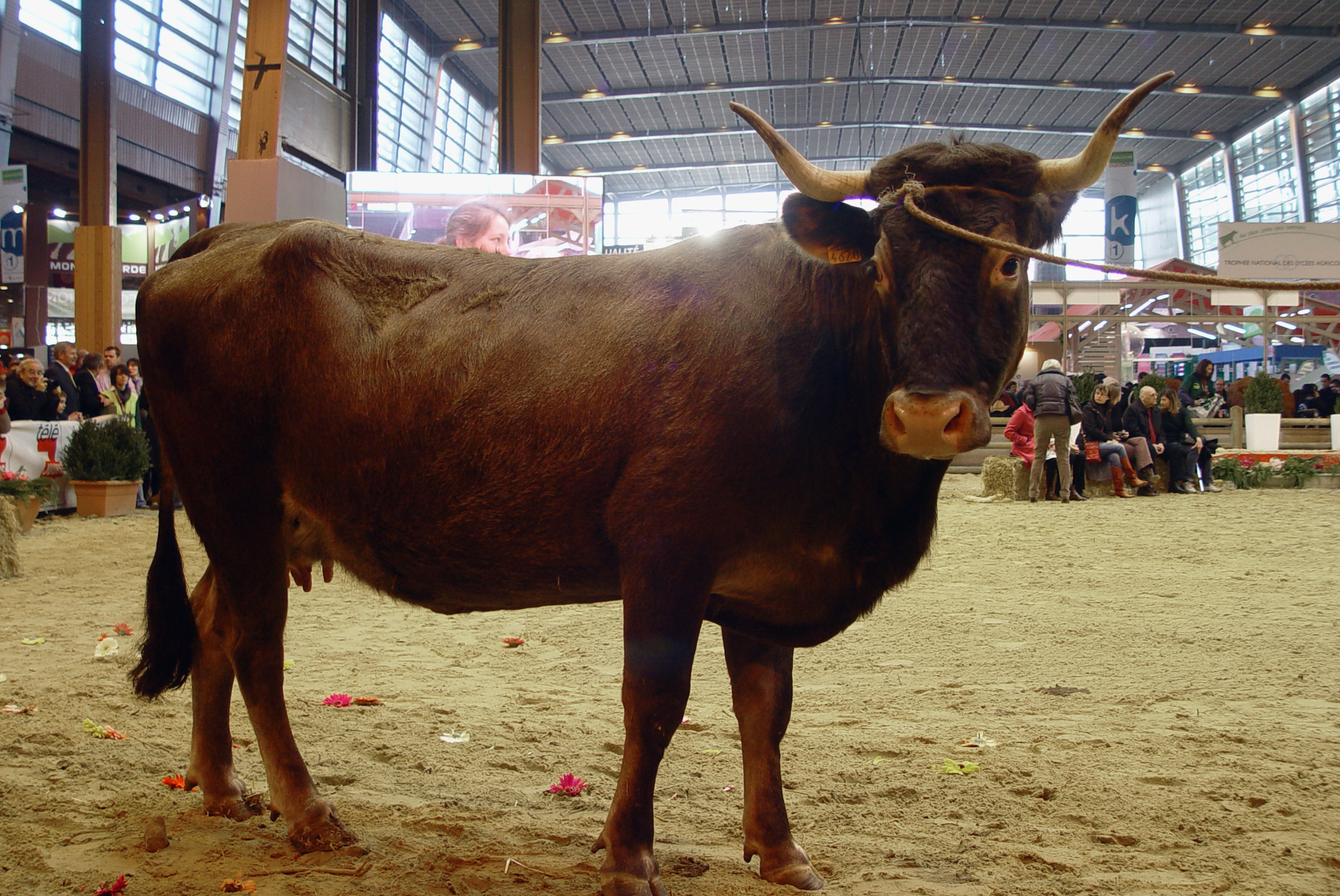
- Conservation status: FAO (2007): endangered-maintained
- Other names: Casta; Auroise; Saint Gironnaise
- Country of origin: France
- Distribution: Midi-Pyrénées
- Use: formerly triple-purpose, meat, milk and draught

Traits
- Weight: Male: 900 kg; Female: 600 kg
- Height: Female: 135 cm
- Skin colour: pale
- Coat: grey or chestnut-brown
- Horn status: horned in both sexes
- Cattle; Bos (primigenius) taurus

The Aure et Saint-Girons or Casta is an endangered French breed of domestic cattle. The breed name derives from its two principal areas of origin, the Vallée d'Aure in the département of the Hautes-Pyrénées, and the area of Saint-Girons and the Couserans in the Ariège. The name "Casta" derives from its chestnut colour.

== History ==
The Casta originates in the French Pyrénées. It is among the oldest breeds of the Midi. Traditionally, two types were recognised, from two different areas of the range: the Auroise, from the Vallée d'Aure in the département of the Hautes-Pyrénées; and the Saint-Gironnaise, from the area of Saint-Girons and the Couserans in the Ariège. The breed was found throughout the high Pyrénées, from the area of Tarbes in the west to Foix in the east.

The breed was officially named the "race bovine d'Aure et de Saint-Girons" in 1900. A herd-book was established in 1901 or in 1919.

During the 1960s there was some limited cross-breeding with the Bazadais breed of the Gironde.

Between 1930 and 1958, the population of the Casta fell from about 30 000 to less than 9 000 head. In the years after the Second World War, numbers fell still further, and by 1983 only 76 cows in 12 farms could be found. The breed was listed by the FAO as "endangered-maintained" in 2007. In 2005, the population was estimated at 427 head; in 2014 it was 320.

== Characteristics ==
The Casta is usually grey, but may also be chestnut-brown. The skin and mucous membranes are pale. The horns are lyre-shaped. Bulls weigh about 900 kg and cows about 600 kg. Cows stand about 135 cm at the withers.

== Uses ==
The Casta was originally a triple-purpose breed, kept for meat, for milk, and for draught work. It is now raised mainly for meat. The milk has a high fat content, and is used in the production of Bethmale cheese.
