= Pierre Cadéac =

French composer and probably singer

Pierre Cadéac (fl. 1538–1558) was a French composer and probably singer of the Renaissance, active in Gascony. He wrote both sacred and secular vocal music, and had his music published in Paris and Lyons. His most famous work was the chanson Je suis deshéritée, which many later composers, including Lassus and Palestrina, used as a basis for parody masses.

== Life ==
He was most likely from the small town of Cadéac, in the southern part of Gascony near the Pyrenees, as suggested by his name. All that is known about his life is that he was choirmaster in Auch, the historical capital of the region, in 1556, as mentioned on the title page of Du Chemin's publication of his Missa Alma Redemptoris Mater. A poem by Bernard du Poey, published in 1551, also mentions him as being resident in Auch, but does not give his employment or any other details. In 1538 Jacques Moderne published some of his chansons in Lyons; this is the earliest date of activity known for Cadéac, but his location or employment at that time are not known.

== Music and influence ==
Cadéac wrote music in most of the vocal forms of the time and place, including secular chansons, motets, mass settings, Magnificats, and one isolated setting of the Credo (part of the mass). A total of 11 chansons, 24 motets, eight settings of the mass, and four of the Magnificat survive. His chansons seem to be his earliest work, and he turned to sacred music later in his career. Pierre Attaingnant (in Paris) and Jacques Moderne (in Lyons) published most of his chansons between 1538 and 1541. One of them became extraordinarily famous: Je suis deshéritée was widely distributed, and composers as diverse as Jean Maillard in France, Nicolas Gombert in the Habsburg chapel and the Low Countries, Orlande de Lassus in Bavaria, and Palestrina in Italy all used it as source material for masses later in the century.

The distribution of his motets was also extraordinary, with copies found in places as remote from their Gascon origin as Madrid, Strasbourg, Nuremberg, Venice, and Kraków, Poland. According to Grove, a version of his chanson Je suis deshéritée has been found in England, fitted with English words ("Oure Father, God Celestiall"), though in fact the words are in the distinct Scots language, not English. (It is a translation of the Lord's Prayer, though the original is not so reverent: "I'm broke. Go tell my friend" is the gist of the opening stanza.)

Cadéac's musical style originated from the homophony and simplicity prevalent in the 1530s, especially in the Parisian chanson at the time of Clément Janequin, with clear diction, short phrases, general avoidance of dense polyphony, and abundant parallel imperfect intervals. He used these same simple textures in his sacred music, textures which contrasted considerably with the dense counterpoint being written by the Netherlanders of his generation (composers such as Nicolas Gombert).

Most of his motets appeared in 1555, in a publication by Le Roy & Ballard, Petri Cadeac musici excellentissima moteta. The 18 pieces in this set are for from four to six voices. This publication was the biggest single print of his music of the time.
