= Château de Tramezaygues =

Ruined French castle

Coordinates: 42°47′50″N 0°17′13″E

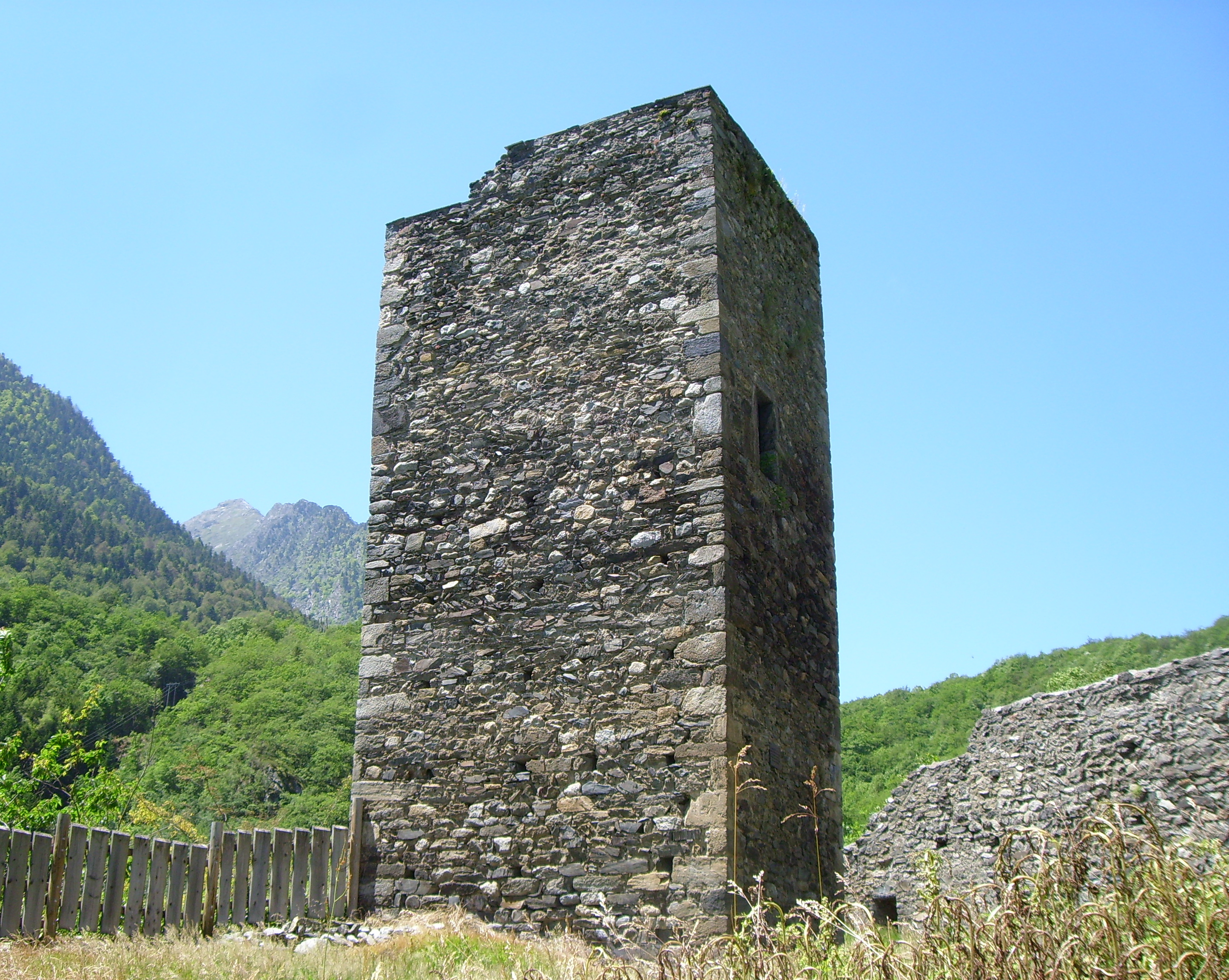
The castle keep

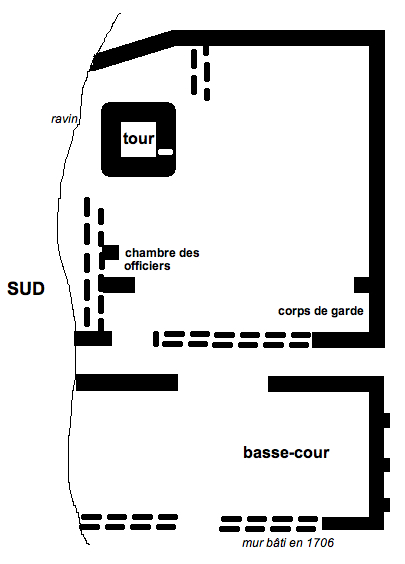
Plan of the site (fallen walls shown by broken lines)

The Château de Tramezaygues is a ruined castle in the commune of Tramezaïgues in the Hautes-Pyrénées département of France.

== History ==
The castle is recorded from the 12th century, from when parts of the keep date. The enceinte is dates from the 17th and 18th centuries. The building was in use and maintained until 1808. The remains, comprising a piece of the enceinte and the keep, were restored in 1990.

In 1712, Louis XIV sent 100 men to guard the frontier with Spain. Fifty were stationed at Château de Tramezaygues and had to be fed and supplied by the local populace.

The castle was primarily military and defensive, the top of the keep serving as surveillance post able to communicate with other watch towers in the valley by fire signals. It was also a prison and, in the 17th century, became a customs post. After the French Revolution, it lost its military function.

Around 1980, the ruins were "given" by the commune to Isabelle Mir, a former ski champion. However, the courts found that the municipal authorities had acted irregularly, nullified the sale and returned to site to public ownership.

The castle is the property of the commune. It has been listed since 1980 as a monument historique by the French Ministry of Culture.

== Gallery ==
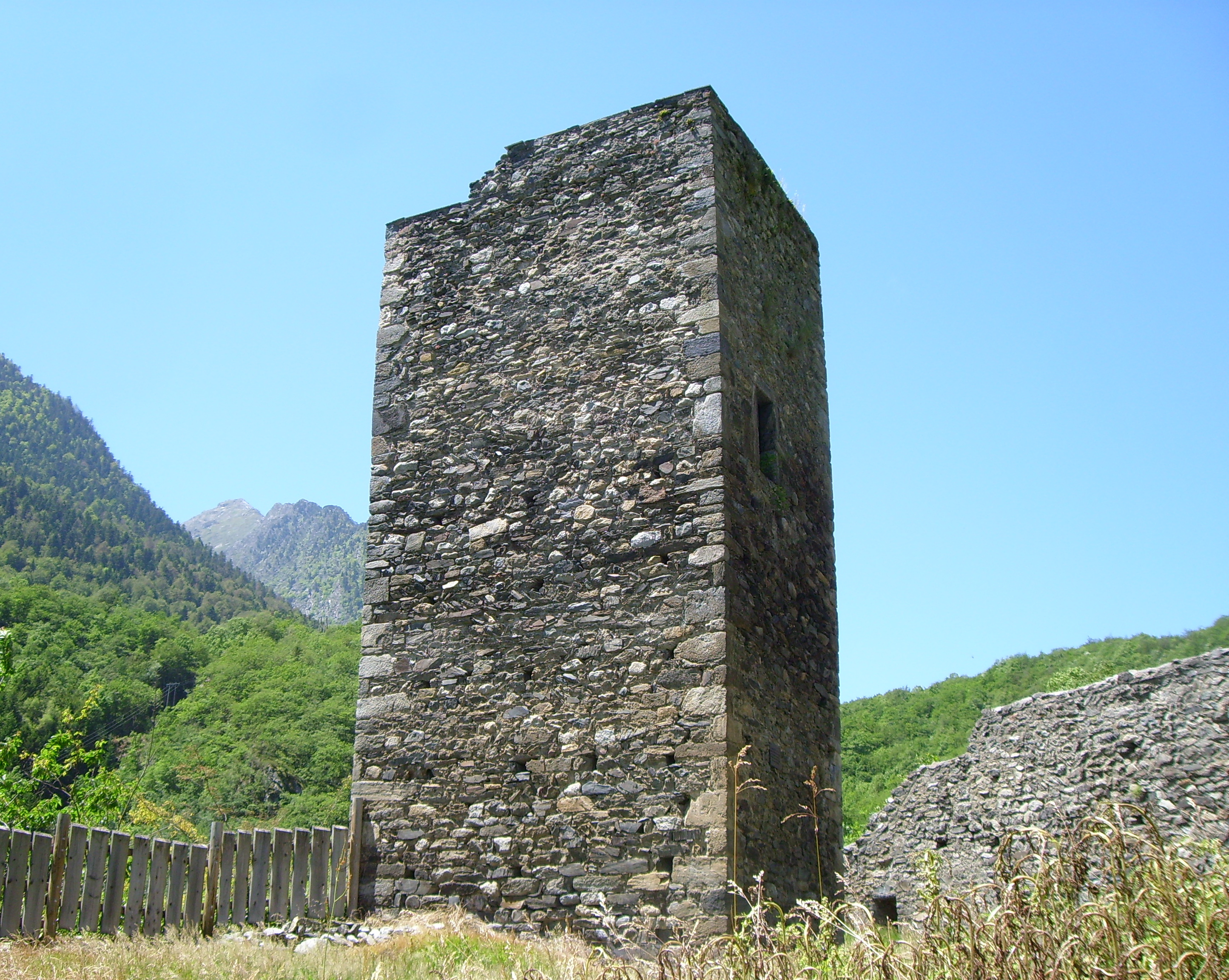
Keep

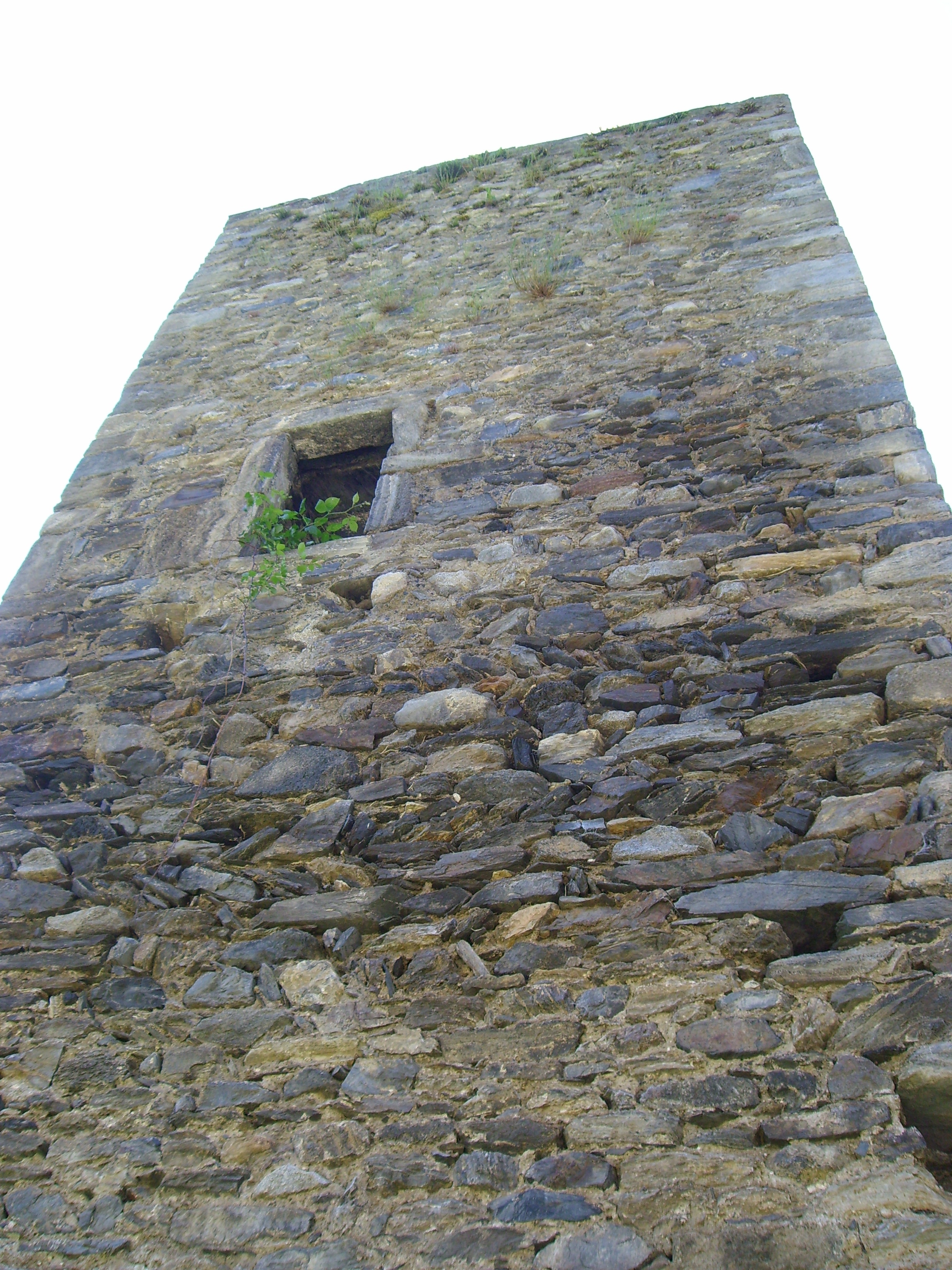
North face of the keep with entrance 6 metres above ground

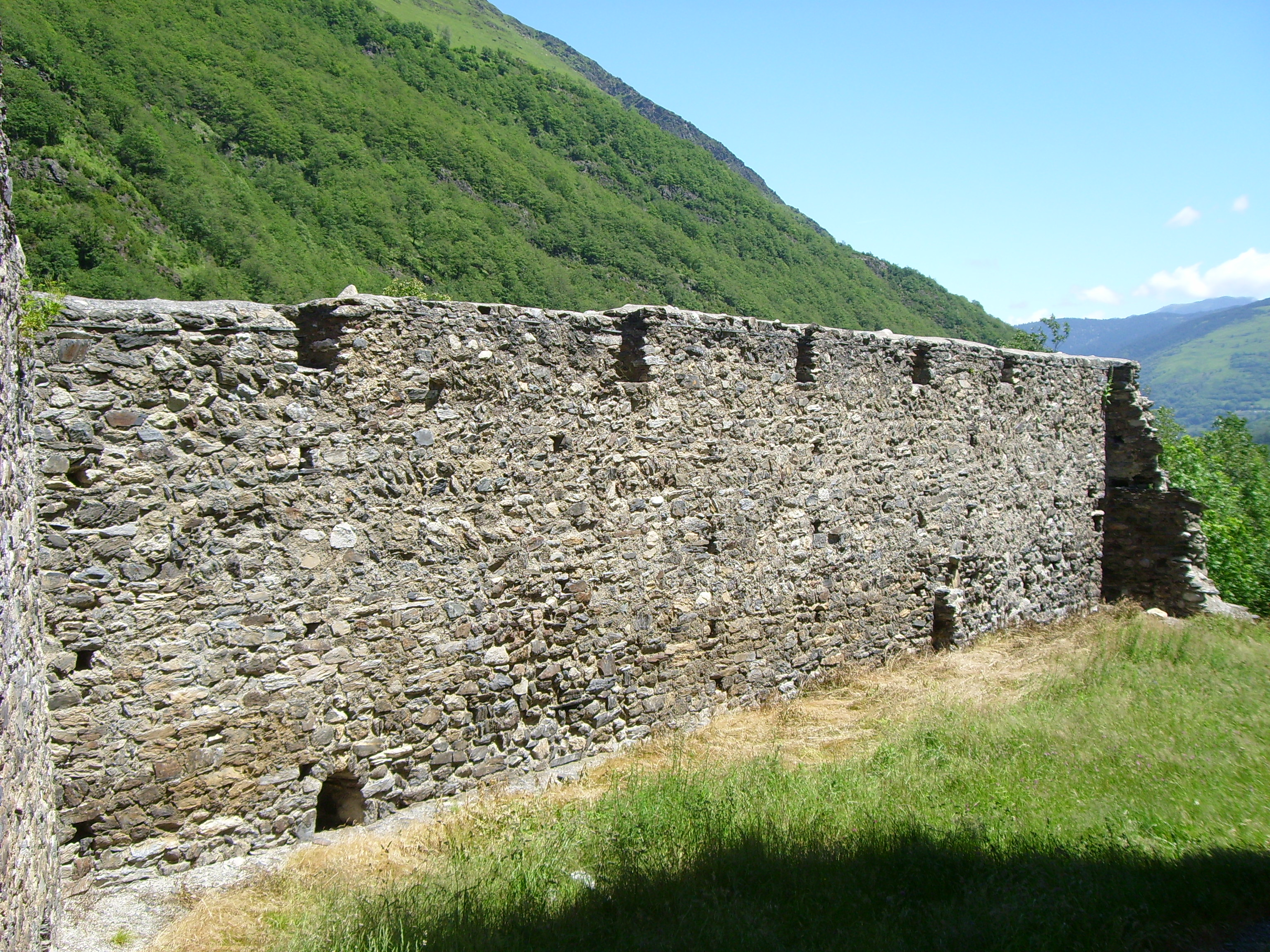
North wall of the higher courtyard

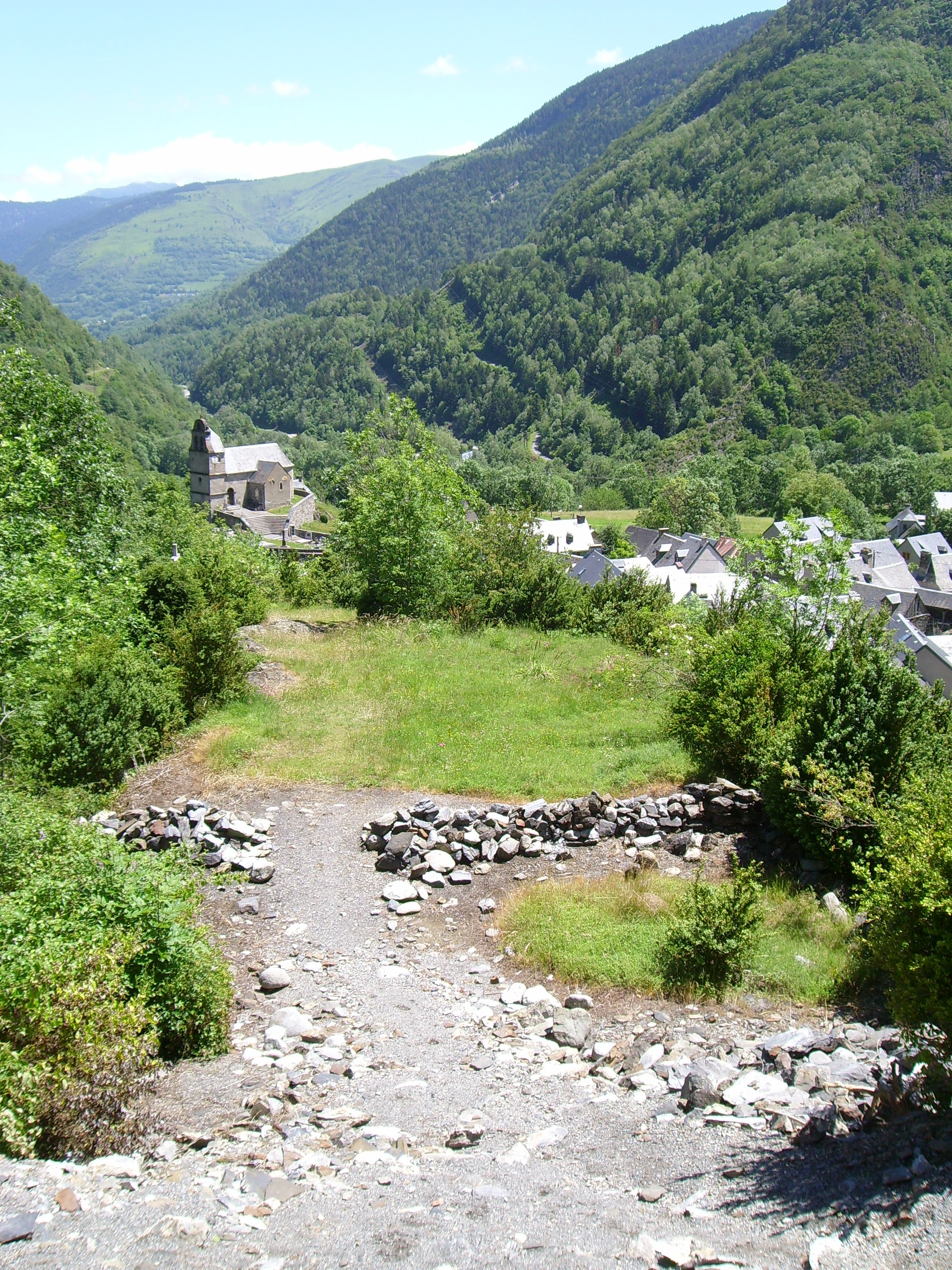
Lower courtyard with church of Tramezaïgues in background

== See also ==
- List of castles in France
