= Guchen =

- Commune
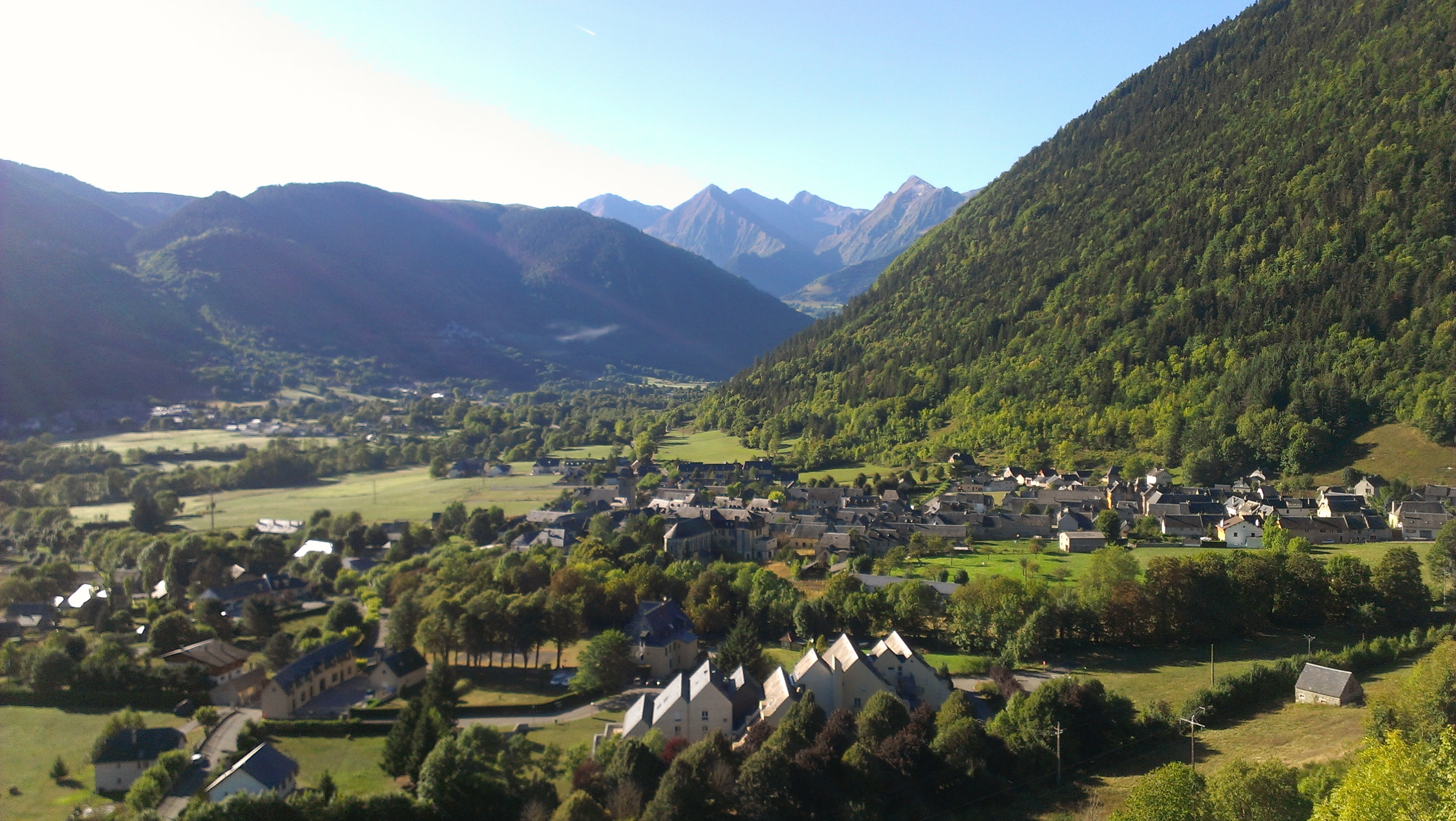
- A general view of Guchen

- Coat of arms
- Location of Guchen
- Location within France Location within Occitanie
- Coordinates: 42°51′50″N 0°20′17″E
- Country: France
- Region: Occitania
- Department: Hautes-Pyrénées
- Arrondissement: Bagnères-de-Bigorre
- Canton: Neste, Aure et Louron
- Intercommunality: Aure-Louron

Government
  - Mayor (2020–2026): Alain Dubernard
- Area^{1}: 5.55 km^{2} (2.14 sq mi)
- Elevation: 772 m (2,533 ft)
- Highest elevation: 1,659 m (5,443 ft)
- Lowest elevation: 751 m (2,464 ft)
- Population (2023): 301
  - Density: 54.2/km^{2} (140/sq mi)
- Time zone: UTC+01:00 (CET)
  - Summer (DST): UTC+02:00 (CEST)
- INSEE/Postal code: 65212 /65440
- ^{1} French Land Register data, which excludes lakes, ponds, glaciers > 1 km^{2} (0.386 sq mi or 247 acres) and river estuaries.

Guchen is a commune in the Hautes-Pyrénées department in south-western France.

== See also ==
- Communes of the Hautes-Pyrénées department
