= Cadéac =

- Commune
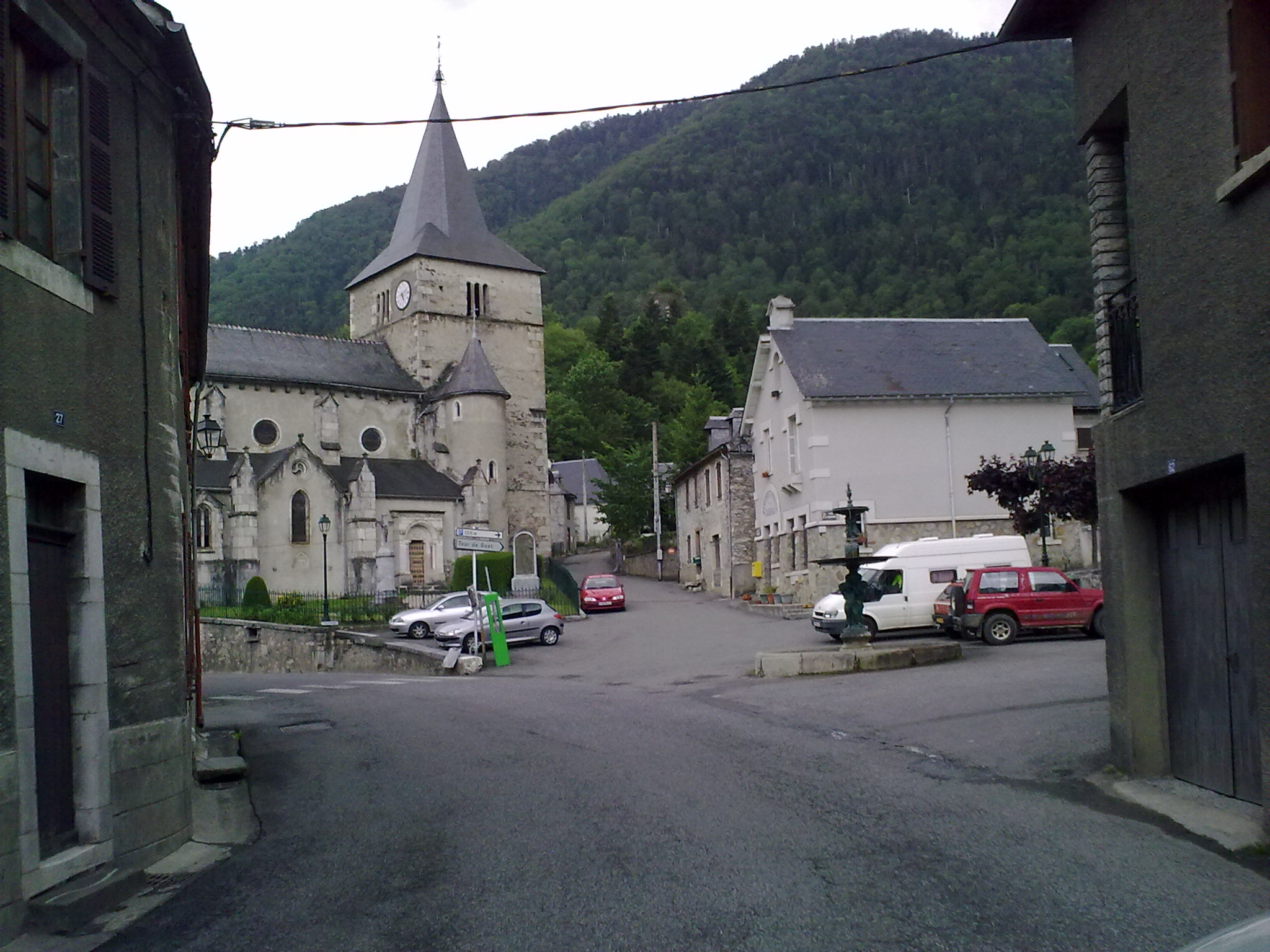
- The village of Cadéac and the church of Saint-Félix

- Coat of arms
- Location of Cadéac
- Location within France Location within Occitanie
- Coordinates: 42°53′24″N 0°21′03″E
- Country: France
- Region: Occitania
- Department: Hautes-Pyrénées
- Arrondissement: Bagnères-de-Bigorre
- Canton: Neste, Aure et Louron
- Intercommunality: Aure-Louron

Government
  - Mayor (2020–2026): Jean-Louis Anglade
- Area^{1}: 6.15 km^{2} (2.37 sq mi)
- Elevation: 737 m (2,418 ft)
- Highest elevation: 1,607 m (5,272 ft)
- Lowest elevation: 716 m (2,349 ft)
- Population (2023): 309
  - Density: 50.2/km^{2} (130/sq mi)
- Time zone: UTC+01:00 (CET)
  - Summer (DST): UTC+02:00 (CEST)
- INSEE/Postal code: 65116 /65240
- ^{1} French Land Register data, which excludes lakes, ponds, glaciers > 1 km^{2} (0.386 sq mi or 247 acres) and river estuaries.

Cadéac (French pronunciation: [kadeak]; Occitan: Cadiac) is a commune in the Hautes-Pyrénées department in south-western France.

== See also ==
- Pierre Cadéac, French composer of the 16th century
- Communes of the Hautes-Pyrénées department
