= Grézian =

- Commune
- Coat of arms
- Location of Grézian
- Location within France Location within Occitanie
- Coordinates: 42°52′12″N 0°21′04″E
- Country: France
- Region: Occitania
- Department: Hautes-Pyrénées
- Arrondissement: Bagnères-de-Bigorre
- Canton: Neste, Aure et Louron
- Intercommunality: Aure-Louron

Government
  - Mayor (2020–2026): Sabine Rahali
- Area^{1}: 1.98 km^{2} (0.76 sq mi)
- Elevation: 745 m (2,444 ft)
- Highest elevation: 1,200 m (3,900 ft)
- Lowest elevation: 732 m (2,402 ft)
- Population (2023): 87
  - Density: 44/km^{2} (110/sq mi)
- Time zone: UTC+01:00 (CET)
  - Summer (DST): UTC+02:00 (CEST)
- INSEE/Postal code: 65209 /65440
- ^{1} French Land Register data, which excludes lakes, ponds, glaciers > 1 km^{2} (0.386 sq mi or 247 acres) and river estuaries.

Grézian (French pronunciation: [ɡʁezjɑ̃]; Occitan: Gredian) is a commune in the Hautes-Pyrénées department in south-western France.

== See also ==
- Communes of the Hautes-Pyrénées department
