= Sarrancolin =

- Commune
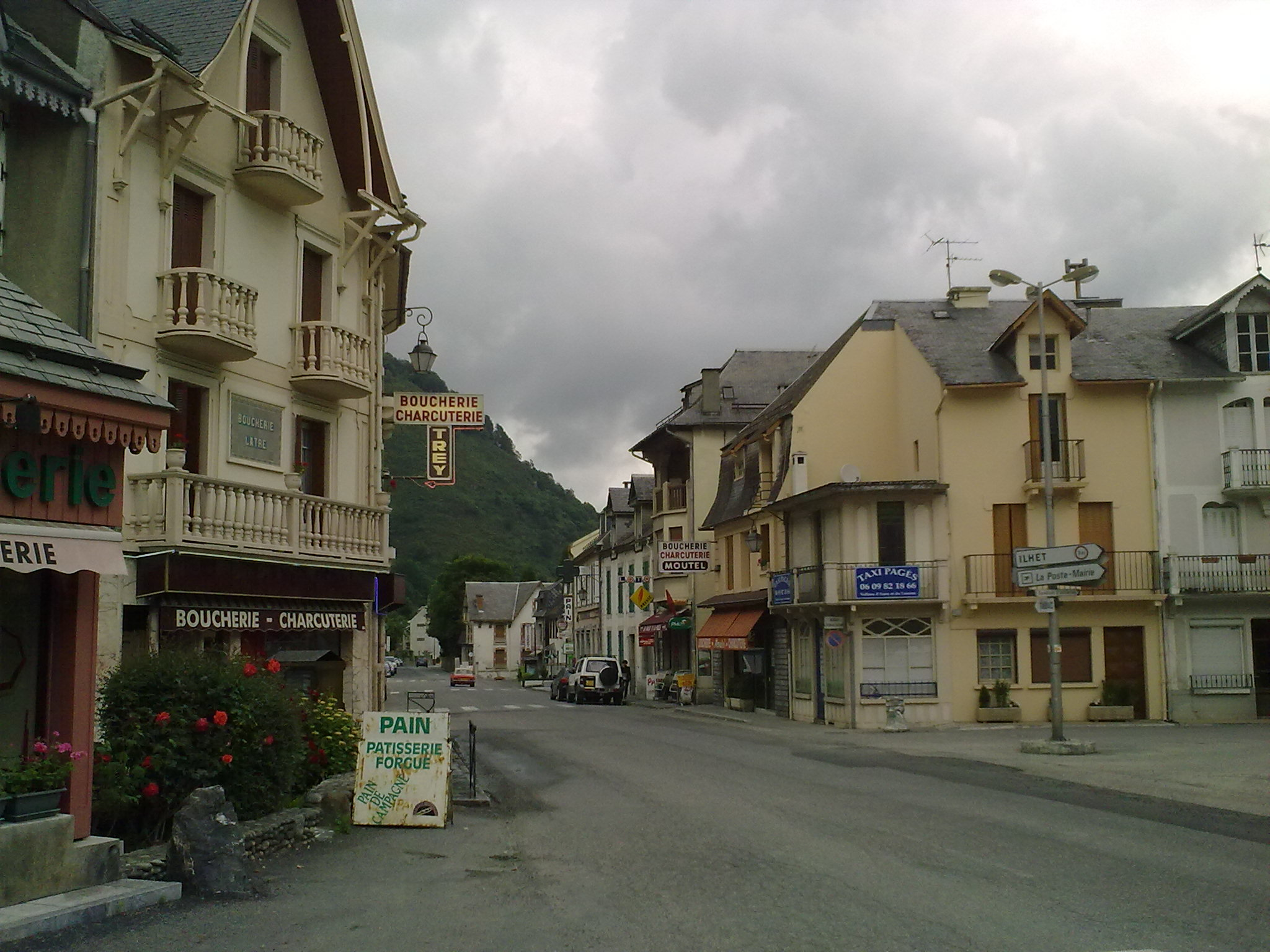
- The village of Sarrancolin

- Coat of arms
- Location of Sarrancolin
- Location within France Location within Occitanie
- Coordinates: 42°58′03″N 0°22′41″E
- Country: France
- Region: Occitania
- Department: Hautes-Pyrénées
- Arrondissement: Bagnères-de-Bigorre
- Canton: Neste, Aure et Louron
- Intercommunality: Aure-Louron

Government
  - Mayor (2020–2026): Yann Helary
- Area^{1}: 32.1 km^{2} (12.4 sq mi)
- Elevation: 630 m (2,070 ft)
- Highest elevation: 1,890 m (6,200 ft)
- Lowest elevation: 600 m (2,000 ft)
- Population (2023): 546
  - Density: 17.0/km^{2} (44.1/sq mi)
- Time zone: UTC+01:00 (CET)
  - Summer (DST): UTC+02:00 (CEST)
- INSEE/Postal code: 65408 /65410
- ^{1} French Land Register data, which excludes lakes, ponds, glaciers > 1 km^{2} (0.386 sq mi or 247 acres) and river estuaries.

Sarrancolin (French pronunciation: [saʁɑ̃kɔlɛ̃]) is a commune in the Hautes-Pyrénées department in south-western France.

== See also ==
- Communes of the Hautes-Pyrénées department
