= Aragnouet =

- Commune
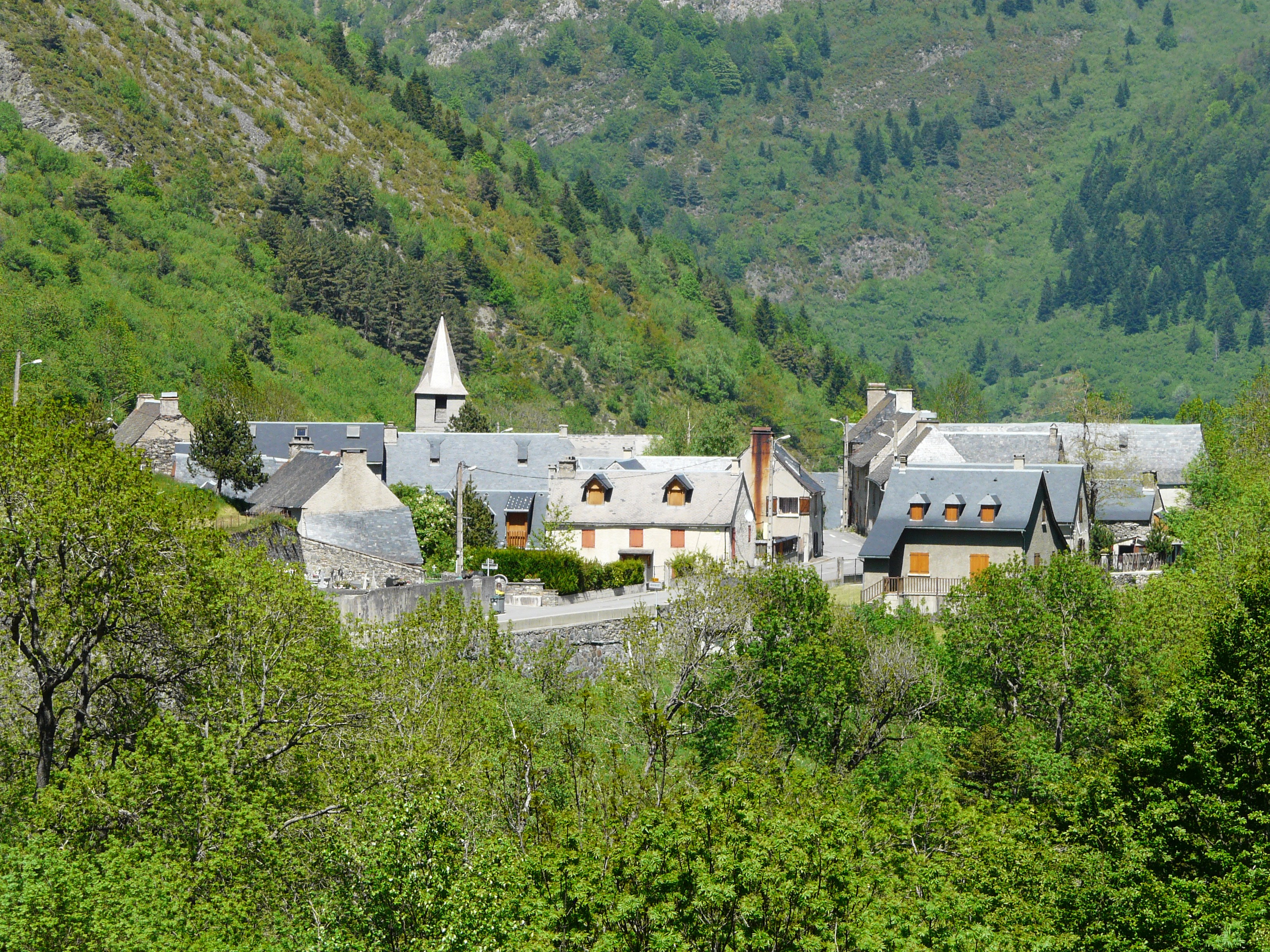
- The village of Aragnouet

- Coat of arms
- Location of Aragnouet
- Location within France Location within Occitanie
- Coordinates: 42°47′24″N 0°14′13″E
- Country: France
- Region: Occitania
- Department: Hautes-Pyrénées
- Arrondissement: Bagnères-de-Bigorre
- Canton: Neste, Aure et Louron

Government
  - Mayor (2020–2026): Jean Mouniq
- Area^{1}: 108.29 km^{2} (41.81 sq mi)
- Elevation: 1,100 m (3,600 ft)
- Highest elevation: 3,194 m (10,479 ft)
- Lowest elevation: 956 m (3,136 ft)
- Population (2023): 289
  - Density: 2.67/km^{2} (6.91/sq mi)
- Time zone: UTC+01:00 (CET)
  - Summer (DST): UTC+02:00 (CEST)
- INSEE/Postal code: 65017 /65170
- ^{1} French Land Register data, which excludes lakes, ponds, glaciers > 1 km^{2} (0.386 sq mi or 247 acres) and river estuaries.

Aragnouet (French pronunciation: [aʁaɲwɛt]; Occitan: Aranhoet) is a commune in the Hautes-Pyrénées department in southwestern France. It is near with the Spanish border.

== Population ==
Historical population
Year	Pop.	±% p.a.
1968	201	—
1975	160	−3.21%
1982	260	+7.18%
1990	336	+3.26%
1999	260	−2.81%
2007	244	−0.79%
2012	240	−0.33%
2017	248	+0.66%
2023	289	+2.58%
Source: INSEE

== Transport ==
The Bielsa tunnel under the Pyrenees connects Aragnouet and Bielsa in Spain. It was first opened in 1976. In 2002, the French government unilaterally decided to close the tunnel to heavy-goods vehicles over 3.5 tonnes, a decision which caused serious concern in Aragon.

== See also ==
- Communes of the Hautes-Pyrénées department
