= Pierre de Ségusson =

16th Century French noble and diplomat

Pierre de Ségusson sieur de Longlée

12th French Ambassador to Spain
- In office August 1582 – April 1590
- Preceded by: Baron de Saint-Gouard
- Succeeded by: Vacant

Personal details
- Born: c. 1540 Asnières
- Died: 1592-1598
- Parents: Hilarion de Ségusson (father); Françoise de Salles (mother)

Pierre de Ségusson, sieur de Longlée (c. 1540–1592/1598) was a French noble, churchmen and ambassador during the latter French Wars of Religion. Born into a noble family of the province of Maine, Longlée entered a career in the church. By 1556 he had secured a court position as a valet de chambre, and this would be followed with the position of gentilhomme servant in 1574 at the start of the reign of Henri III. He served as the sécretaire (secretary) to the French ambassador to España the baron de Saint-Gouard for nine years, and is first attested in the role in 1574. He performed a variety of services for the ambassador during this time, and was warmly recommended to the French court by his superior. In 1579 he undertook an extraordinary mission to Portugal for the crown, to advocate for the queen mothers rights to the Portuguese throne. He would again travel to Portugal with Saint-Gouard in 1581-1582 during the crisis of the Portuguese succession, and when Saint-Gouard was relieved as ambassador at the end of 1582, Longlée was chosen to serve as his temporary replacement. His appointment would not however be temporary, despite this he would not receive the formal office of ambassador, and through his ambassadorship from 1582 to 1580 he technically held the position of 'permanent resident'.

In this position he was faced with the collapse of Franco-Spanish relations. This was induced firstly by the intervention of the king's brother, the duc d'Alençon (duke of Alençon) in the rebellion against Spanish rule in Spanish Nederland. Longlée made efforts to try and convince the Spanish king Felipe II that Henri was uninvolved in his brothers enterprises. He also attempted to secure the release of captive Frenchman who had been pressed into service in the Spanish galleys. In 1584 he reported to Henri on the treasonous dealings of the duc de Montmorency and king of Navarre. In June of that year the king's brother Alençon died, this worsened relations between France and España, as Alençon had been the king's heir, and in his absence the succession defaulted to the Protestant king of Navarre, a prospect which was intolerable to Felipe. Through his ambassador in France, Felipe threw his weight behind the Catholic ligue (league) that formed to oppose Navarre's succession among other royal policies. In March 1585 the ligue entered war with the French crown, with Felipe's support. Longlée protested to the Spanish king without luck. Longlée continually complained about the actions of the Spanish ambassador in France. In August 1585 he reported on the intrigues of several representatives of the queen of Navarre, who hoped to form an alliance with Felipe against her husband. As the Spanish moved towards war with England, Longlée provided what information he could on the Armada they were preparing. In 1589, Henri was assassinated, and was succeeded by his Protestant cousin the king of Navarre who took the name Henri IV, Longlée remained a loyal royalist through this transition. Henri was not recognised as the French king by Felipe or the ligueur (leaguer) party in France and thus Longlée's position in España became even more tenuous. After a few months requesting Henri authorise his recall he received permission to retire from España in April 1590. He received only limited reward for his diplomatic service from Henri, who made him a gentilhomme ordinaire de la chambre du roi (ordinary gentleman of the king's chamber) by 1592. He died sometime between 1592 and 1598.

== Early life and family ==
Pierre de Ségusson was born sometime around 1540 close to the town of Asnières, the son of Hilarion de Ségusson and Françoise de Salles. He was one of six children with one brother named Marin; and four sisters named Marie, Julienne, Guyonne and Jehanne.

The Ségusson family held its origins in the parish of Ségrie. The seigneurie of Longlée had entered the Ségusson family in the fifteenth century through the marriage of Jehan de Ségusson with Agnès de Longlée.

Longlée was a man of the church and would remain celibate throughout his life. Ribera stresses that though he was a cleric he only ever received minor orders. Ribera argues it is challenging to know how sincere his Catholic convictions were, but that he was interested in the defence of Catholicism.

Little is known about his education. The historian Ribera argues we can imagine it to have been an assiduous one judging by his later ambassadorial career. Similarly little is known about how he ended up in the French capital. Mousset speculates that the husband of his sister Marie, Jehan Astier who held a position in Mary Stuart's household, might have enabled him to gain office.

By 1556 he held the position of valet de chambre to the second son of king Henri II.

== Reign of Henri III ==
=== Humble beginnings ===
At the dawn of the reign of Henri III, in 1574, Longlée became a gentilhomme servant (gentleman servant) of the new monarch.

=== Sécretaire ===
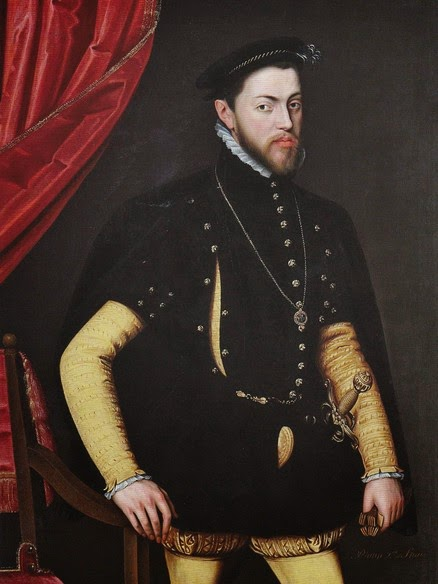
Felipe II, the king of España

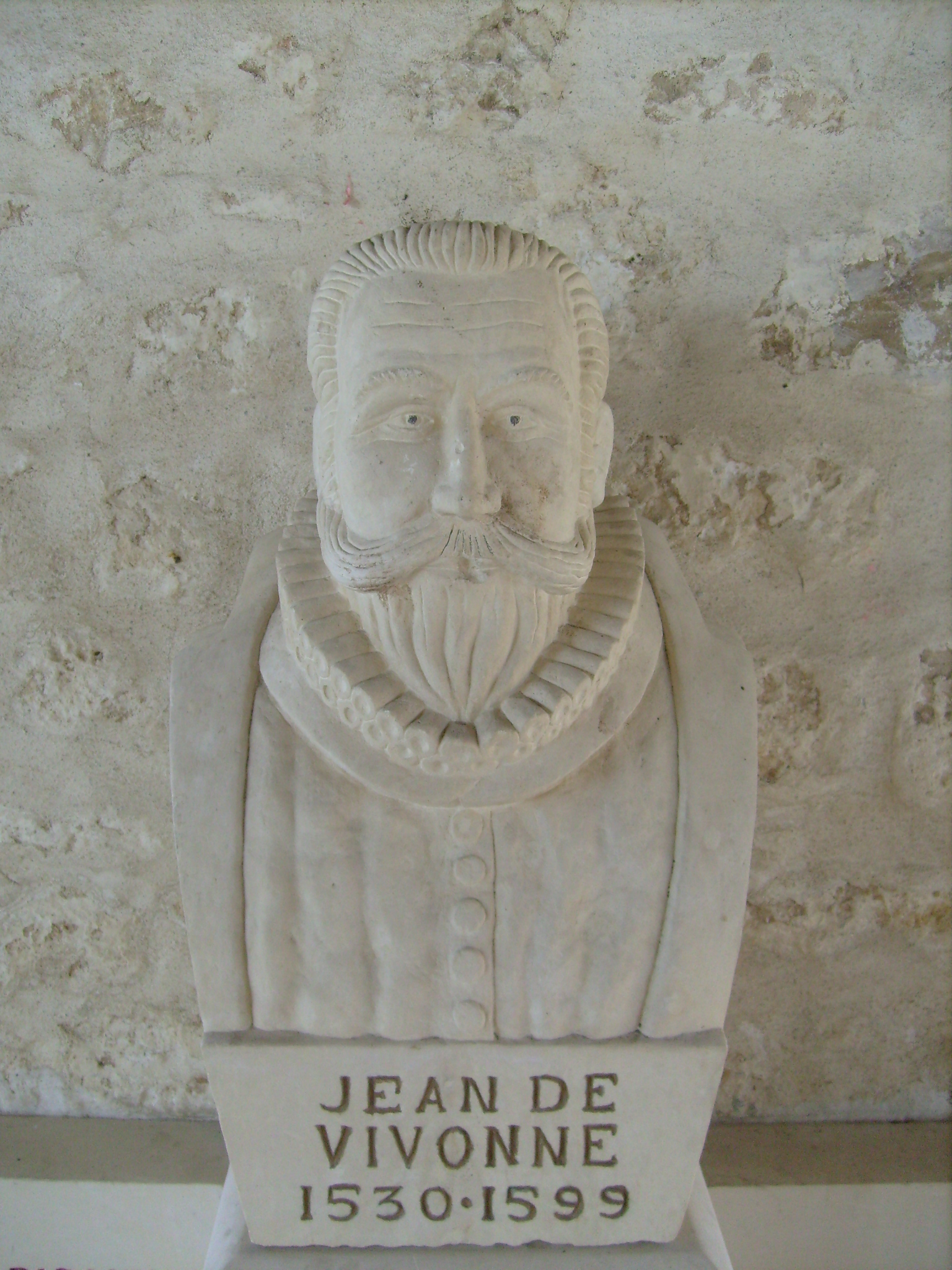
Baron de Saint-Gouard who served as the French ambassador to España from 1572 to 1582

Though he served as a sécretaire (secretary) to the French ambassador in España, the baron de Saint-Gouard for nine years, the first record of him in the country comes from a letter sent by Zuñiga to the Spanish king Felipe II in October 1574. As sécretaire to the ambassador, Longlée occupied a flexible position. He could serve the ambassador as the writer of the diplomatic despatches (reports between the ambassador and the crown), a courier, or a more discreet spokesperson for the ambassador when circumstances required. Beyond this, in the absence of the ambassador the sécretaire could take care of affairs until either the ambassadors return, or in the event of the ambassadors death, his replacements arrival. He would on occasion serve as a courier between Madrid and Paris during this period. A receipt records that Saint-Gouard paid him 400 écus soleil for a round trip he made between the capitals.

In early 1575 he gained the benefice of the chapel of Sainte-Croix, which was located near Asnières.

In 1579, Longlée was entrusted with an extraordinary diplomatic mission to Portugal. In addition to seeking compensation for the mistreatment of the French in the country, he was to lay the groundwork for the queen mother Catherine to make a claim to the Portuguese crown.

Having been appraised of secret negotiations undertaken by the seigneur de Lanssac that sought to seize the port of Al Araish in north west Africa, Saint-Gouard entrusted Longlée with uncovering the specific nature of what was transpiring. The sécretaire had great success in his efforts to investigate the matter, so much so that the Spanish ambassador in France complained in August 1579 of the accuracy of the information that was in the possession of Saint-Gouard about the affair. Felipe was advised to keep his eyes on Saint-Gouard as he was clearly in contact with those who had intimate knowledge of their dealings.

Saint-Gouard richly praised Longlée's services in a letter to the sécretaire d'État (secretary of state) the seigneur de Villeroy in January 1580. His sécretaire deserved a lot, and always gave a good showing at whatever service he was entrusted to deliver. He effused that the French crown had no greater servant than Longlée, and that he [Saint-Gouard] loved him like a son for his many virtues. Ribera opines that Longlée owed the majority of his career to Saint-Gouard. As such, Longlée endeavoured to show his gratitude and would keep his patron appraised of Spanish affairs years later after Saint-Gouard received appointment as ambassador to the Papal States.

=== Portuguese affairs ===
On 17 June 1581, Henri ordered Saint-Gouard to travel to Portugal so that he might protest the 'outrages' committed against the French in the country Felipe had recently conquered. Planning a departure to Portugal so that he might unite with Felipe in Lisboa, the ambassador Saint-Gouard was faced with the difficult prospect of financing his trip. Before he was able to depart, Henri informed him of his intention to relieve him of his post and allow Longlée to manage the current affairs of the role. Saint-Gouard was greatly relieved by this and wrote effusively to the king thanking him on 28 August 1581. To effect his withdrawal would require informing Felipe, thus necessitating his travel to Lisboa.

During an audience with Felipe in Lisboa, Saint-Gouard explained his upcoming departure and his temporary replacement in the charge by the sieur de Longlée. The sécretaire complained to Henri from Lisboa in January 1582 of the actions of a French merchant named Étienne Chataigner, who he alleged was bringing about the ruin of the king's subjects in the city. Longlée informed the king that he had protested to Felipe about the behaviours of Chataigner, but rather than offer him a commissioner to prosecute the 'wicked man', Felipe ignored his protests. Longlée alleged the Spanish king was happy to favour Chataigner in the ruin of the French. After some months in Lisboa, being made to feel most unwelcome, Saint-Gouard resolved to return to Madrid. His financial situation had continued to deteriorate in his absence, with his creditors seizing his wardrobe and horses. Saint-Gouard feared he might be imprisoned. Fortunately for him, Longlée had received money from the French crown and was able to extricate him from the financial troubles. Saint-Gouard was little inclined to wait for the arrival of his permanent replacement, and resolved to return to Lisboa.

Back in the city, Longlée was tasked by the ambassador with securing accommodation for the ambassador. Longlée arranged for his accommodation with a rich Genovese merchant. After a little while in Lisboa then back in Madrid, Saint-Gouard resolved to return to France at the end of 1582. Longlée wrote to Catherine noting his obedience to the royal command that he serve as Saint-Gouard's replacement in September 1582. He assured the queen mother that he would render faithful service.

=== Ambassador ===
Having served as Saint-Gouard's sécretaire for nine years, Longlée ascended to the position of ambassador upon the relief of his predecessor. These years had afforded him on the ground training that prepared him for the difficult position. In particular he had experience of the Spanish court and in the acquisition of information from his responsibilities as a courier between Madrid and Paris. He contrasted with his three immediate predecessors, who had all been noblesse d'épée (military nobles). In addition to this, he was of a lower social rank in the nobility than his predecessors, and this would reduce his prospects for gaining social advancement as a by-product of his service. Saint-Gouard praised Longlée in his announcement of the 'temporary appointment' to Felipe. He described his former sécretaire as intelligent and prudent. Unfortunately despite his praise, Saint-Gouard's combative and assertive style as ambassador made Longlée's position more challenging. Felipe, always suspicious, had been provided a French ambassador in Saint-Gouard who engaged in much intrigue against him. Going forward under Longlée, Felipe would consider the French representative to be someone who was antithetical to his interests.

While Longlée would de facto serve as the French ambassador to España he did not technically hold this office but rather held responsibility as the chargé d'affaires . He was the permanent resident of the French king in Madrid without being ambassador. The reasoning for this was partly due to the increasingly fraught relations between the kingdoms. The Spanish king Felipe had also not bothered to afford the office of ambassador to his representative in Paris for several years. Juan de Vargas Mexia, much like Longlée held the office of 'permanent resident' from 1578 to 1580. By responding in kind, Henri could indicate the low priority in which he held his relations with Felipe. Longlée's appointment came not long after a French naval force had been destroyed by the Spanish at Ponte Delgada. Ribera argues that the fact of his choice is itself an illustration of the weakening of relations between the kingdom, as compared to his predecessors he was far less seasoned, despite his evident experience.

The historian Gellard cautions against reading too much into the technical titulary of the French representatives abroad, arguing the terminology used in correspondence was quite vague and it is only in later periods that the distinction becomes clearer. Nevertheless, Longlée was keenly aware that the lack of the title of ambassador reduced his prospect for advancement, he thus described the importance of his receipt of the title which in his view had the capacity to 'show and maintain the good friendship between princes'. It was initially intended that this would be a temporary role until such time as Henri could send a new ambassador, however it would become permanent. Felipe responded to Longlée's lack of an ambassadorial position by minimising his role, choosing instead to express his policy through his ambassador in Paris. Longlée was informed after audiences that Felipe would reply through his representative in France, and that if Longlée had anything further to express he could do so to the royal secretario (secretary) Idiáquez. Thus he did his best to ignore Longlée. Similarly in August 1583 Henri explained to Longlée that he had been informed by the Spanish ambassador in France that Felipe would answer queries through him, as opposed to through Longlée.

Despite all this, Longlée enjoyed most of the prerogatives afforded to an ambassador. He was allowed to remain covered in front of the Spanish king. He would however be restricted from attending ceremonies or the royal chapel.

It was common for ambassadors to have an audience with the French king and Catherine prior to their departure for their mission to receive their instructions for the mission. However, in Longlée's case he was already in Iberia upon the relief of his predecessor so this was not possible.

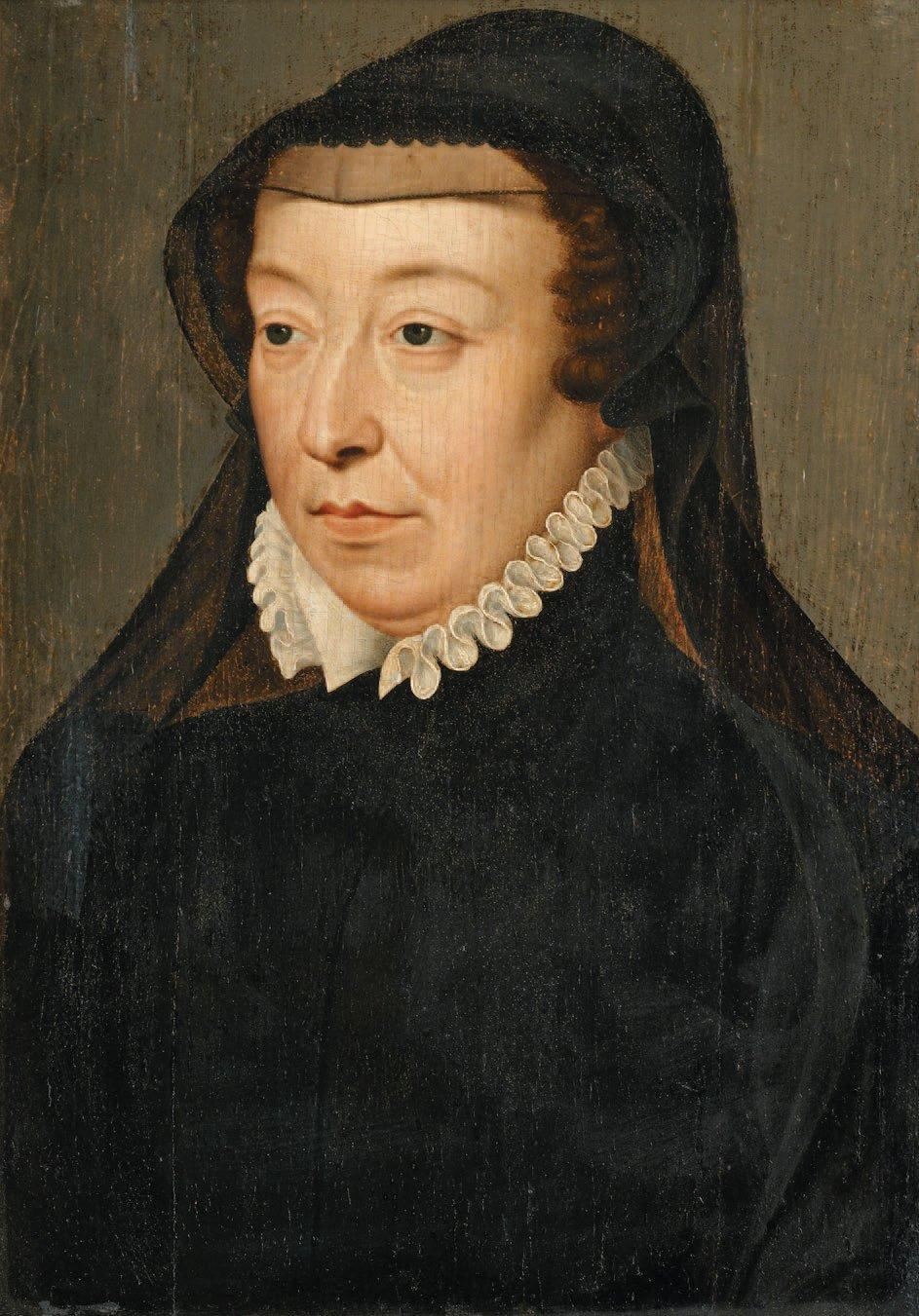
Queen Mother Catherine wife of Henri II, mother of three French kings and a recipient of Longlée's despatches as de facto ambassador to España

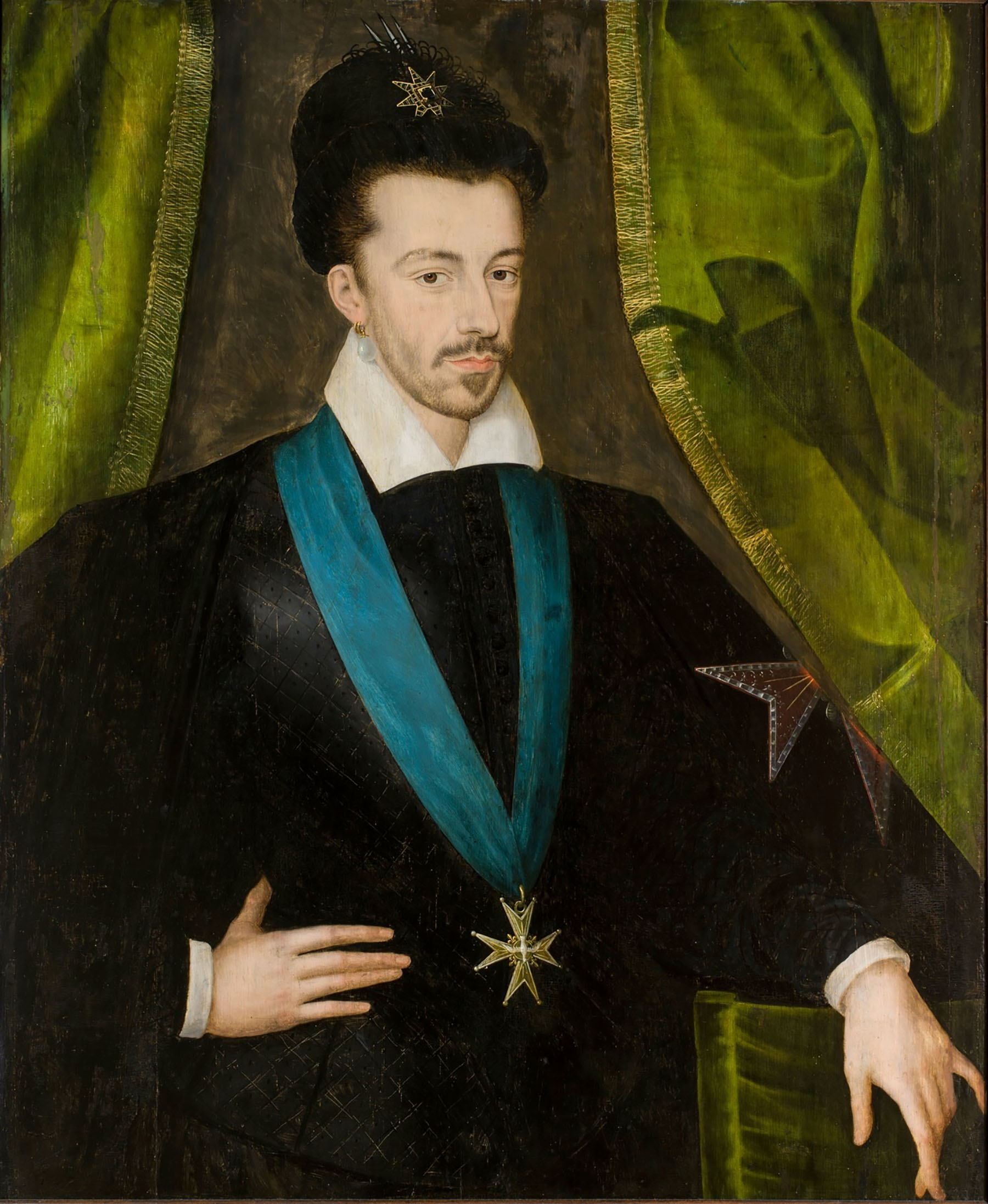
Henri III, the final Valois king of France and recipient of despatches from Longlée

As ambassador to España, Longlée would be a recipient of diplomatic despatches from the queen mother Catherine. Catherine and the king operated in a system of double correspondence with each writing to the ambassador, each of them would focus on different affairs, with Catherine's emphasising for example matrimonial negotiations. Even when the ambassador did not write to Catherine words to her would sometimes be included in the despatch to the king, as seen in Longlée's apologetic despatch in October 1585. In terms of surviving correspondence Longlée received 14 letters from her during his residency. Gellard argues that the contrast in the quantity of despatches received from Catherine by Saint-Gouard and Longlée contrasts so greatly with that enjoyed by the prior three French ambassadors to España (who received a letter from Catherine every couple of weeks during their residencies) that it can only reflect major losses in the surviving record.

For Ribera, Catherine's role in diplomacy declined to a secondary position during the residency of Longlée and his predecessor, with the ambassadors anticipating the briefness of the correspondence to Catherine would be compensated against by the king filling her in on the details. The historian observes during Longlée's tenure the usage in letters to Catherine of phrases such as 'I will not repeat anything to [you] of what [you] will see through the king's despatch' or similar phrases. Gellard considers this position to be an exaggeration. He argues the very fact the double system of correspondence continued and that Henri would have shared the despatches he received with her is meaningful. Regardless, Ribera concedes that in discussions of Felipe's private life, such as the king's relationship with his daughter, Catherine was Longlée's primary vector of correspondence. For example, he reported on the king's 'paternal love' for his daughter the Infanta Isabel (Catherine's granddaughter) in 1586.

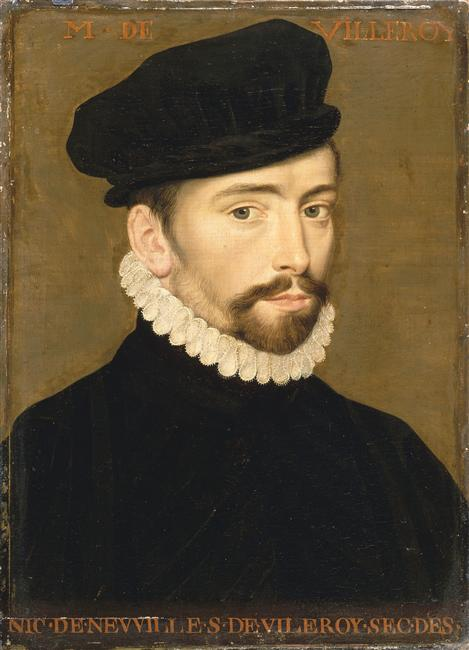
Seigneur de Villeroy, sécretaire d'État under Henri III, and de facto ministre des affaires étrangèrs

For his part, 21 letters survive from Longlée to the queen mother. He was also the only French ambassador to España of the second half of the sixteenth-century who devoted a significant amount of his correspondence to the sécretaires d'État. He wrote 49 letters to these officers, of which 47 were directed to the seigneur de Villeroy. This constitutes around half of his surviving correspondence to the French court. During this period, Villeroy's position grew from that of a sécretaire d'État to something akin to a de facto ministre des affaires étrangèrs (minister of foreign affairs).

When Longlée communicated with the governor of Bayonne a pseudonym was used in the hopes this would reduce the possibility the letters would be of interest for interception. Instead of addressing the governor as La Hillière, the letters were addressed to a 'Monsieur Sosiondo'. Around 60% of the despatches Longlée sent to the French court would be encrypted. When encryption was used, it was typically only for part of a letter, as opposed to the entirety of the communication. The basic unencrypted parts of the communication would offer fairly neutral updates as to the Spanish kings health, the events of the court and other events they are aware of. In the encrypted portion more opinionated analysis would be provided, in addition to disparaging remarks about España and conspiracies they were aware of. This encryption was typically entrusted to the ambassadors sécretaire. Longlée had his own cipher, known as the chiffre de Longlée (Longlée cipher). He would also employ multiple ciphers in his correspondence. The use of ciphers would not guarantee the security of the information he imparted, with some of the letters he sent to the French court found in the Spanish archives, having been intercepted and then deciphered by Luis Valle de la Cerda, one of Felipe's specialists on codebreaking. In addition to the use of decipherment, letters were also vulnerable to being stolen on the road in the late sixteenth-century, and Longlée complained about situations like this in both 1585 and 1587 to Henri and Villeroy. When in 1588 the despatch to Longlée was intercepted and opened on route to him (extending its delivery time to around 50 days), the ambassador wrote to Henri on the matter. He informed the king that many of the letters were opened. He had been in correspondence with the post-master of Bordeaux that the packet had been intercepted somewhere between Bordeaux and Cahors.

Longlée complained of the lethargy of the postal infrastructure in España as inhibiting his ability to maintain more frequent correspondence with the French court. For example, he noted in a despatch of 1 February 1583 that the most recent royal correspondence he possessed dated to December. Further it would not be until 4 October 1586 that he received a royal despatch dated to 23 August. In 1585, Longlée and the other French ambassadors were likely instructed not to use the express mail service on the grounds that it was too costly. Longlée complained in 1585 that there was only one ordinary mail run a month. He noted that he paid the courier with whatever funds he had. Despite the prohibition, Longlée would continue to send some of his despatches by express delivery, assuring Henri that the king would not blame him for the caution he was taking, this was however the exception. There were several routes by which mail between the two kingdoms could run over land, be it through Bayonne, Narbonne or Barcelona. Some despatches ended up passing through Toulouse, however Longlée opined to Villeroy in October 1585 that he was ill inclined to continue using this route as it was too slow. Beyond the lethargy of the service, Longlée complained that the couriers that were dispatched between the monthly runs of the postal service were sent out in secret, and did not allow him to introduce his correspondence to the mail that they were carrying. In 1588 he apologised to the king for the slow delivering of his despatches and begged Henri to forgive him for the slow arrival. Longlée entrusted a handful of his messages to the hands of merchants who were travelling to Bordeaux. This was the case with a merchant in October 1586. Letters sent using merchants were non-ciphered, with ciphered correspondence exclusively provided to men who could be absolutely trusted. On occasion, an unusual method of cost cutting was used by which the despatches between the ambassador and the French court would be slipped into those being carried by a Spanish courier travelling to the Spanish ambassador in Paris. Longlée would also make use an English agent and a courier of the duca di Savoia's (duke of Savoia). It was of course ensured that letters transmitted in such a way were not ones that were particularly sensitive in their contents. The need for rapidity of communication competed with the need for the security of the despatches. In 1587 Longlée thus looked to transport his despatches by ship as opposed to having them cross Iberia, followed by Guyenne and Languedoc. This was despite the uncertain time delays such a prospect offered. During that year he informed Villeroy that a courier of his had taken the sea route due to the dangers he would have faced on the land route. As the situation in France deteriorated from 1587, Longlée made sure to send his despatches in duplicate by multiple different routes to ensure that they reached the French court.

More than other French ambassadors to España, the hostility that existed between the two countries by the time he took up the charge forced Longlée to rely more on 'unofficial informants'. In this he was well served by a network which had been much strengthened since the early 1560s. He protested that his poor finances stopped him hiring as many informants as he desired. Those informants that he was able to employ he sent out to cities across España, such as when he sent an agent to Cartagena in May 1584 to inform him on the intended target of new troop levies. When Felipe was out of Madrid and established at the Real Monasterio de San Lorenzo de El Escorial, Longlée assured he had a man on site to keep him appraised of the affairs that arose. He further enjoyed a good relationship with the Florentine ambassador to España from which he on occasion derived information.

Saint-Gouard warned his successor not to attempt to fulfil the role without a strong reserve of funds at his disposal. It was however challenging for Longlée to follow this advice, given Henri had expressed his desire for Longlée to take the role. Longlée was intimately aware, from his long service as sécretaire to Saint-Gouard of the financial troubles his predecessor had faced. Concern to this effect permeated even his first letters back to the French court in September 1582. As ambassador Longlée enjoyed an income of 7,200 livres, though in 1585 this was increased by a third. This income was significantly lower than the one enjoyed by Saint-Gouard, a by-product of the fact that while he was the de facto ambassador his actual title was that of permanent-resident. However this income was somewhat theoretical, and Longlée like his predecessors would struggle to actually receive the payment of both his income and their expenses. Indeed, there is no record of any payments to Longlée of his basic income, only for his travel and extraordinary expenses. During February 1585, while following the Spanish king on his travel to Zaragoza, Longlée received a reimbursement of 1,600 écus and a supplementary income of 1,000. Lacking much in the way of personal wealth, Longlée fell towards immiseration. Despite this he endeavoured to maintain the dignities of his rank, and use what funds he had towards Frenchman who had escaped the Spanish galleys. In October 1585 he complained to Villeroy, that if he enjoyed great personal wealth, 'no one would ever hear from him', however because he didn't he needed Henri to pay him what he was owed. Without royal favour, Longlée raised the spectre that he would be lost. In February 1588 Longlée complained to the king that he had not been paid for two years and had been forced to take loans out. He warned the king that he might be compelled to 'retire to some village' to preserve the honour of his diplomatic charge from his poverty. He begged Henri to provide him more funds. In April he warned that there was a prospect of his ability to properly serve Henri being compromised by the paucity of his funds. He again begged the king for money, so that he could properly represent the king in the country. A few months later, in June he protested to Henri that his paucity of means shut doors to him which limited his utility to the king as an ambassador, for which he apologised.

Royal diplomacy was not the only line of communication between France and España. During Longlée's residency he reported back to the French crown on the incessant parallel diplomacy conducted by the Protestant king of Navarre and the Lorraine-Guise princes with Felipe II.

=== Early mission ===
With the termination of the prospects of a marriage between Henri's brother Alençon and the English queen Elizabeth I, the young princes mother re-directed her efforts towards a Spanish match. On 9 August 1582 she wrote to Longlée indicating that the Spanish would have six weeks to get back to the French on the possibility of a marriage between Alençon and one of Felipe's daughters.

One of Saint-Gouard's final acts before his departure from España was to try and engineer the burning of the Spanish fleet which was in anchor at Lisboa. To this end he bribed men and had engineers to oversee the operation. He entrusted Longlée to bring it to conclusion and keep him appraised of any developments. The plan would however go nowhere.

There is little trace of the start of Longlée's diplomatic mission. His first preserved despatch is directed towards the secretario Idiáquez from May 1583. There is no more record until December of that year. He informed Henri in that month, that the word in España was that the king's brother, Alençon, was making a great show of his efforts to reconcile with the rebel Dutch Staten-Generaal (who had revolted against Spanish rule). In January 1584 he reported that the understanding he was hearing was that Alençon was preparing a new large force with which to return to Spanish Vlaanderen, and it was inconceivable that this could have assembled without Henri's approval. Longlée felt it would be difficult for Henri to deny his involvement. He stated it would be challenging for him to explain to Felipe why a king so opposed to his brothers enterprises would have given him around 1,000,000 livres since May 1581 for his efforts. He thus requested in February 1584 of Villeroy that he provide him the information he needed to effect a better denial.

=== Naval troubles ===
At the start of his ambassadorship he was faced with a situation in which there were many French captives serving in the Spanish galleys as a result of the two failed French expeditions to conquer the Açores. In January 1584 he bemoaned to Villeroy that if he were to protest for their deliverance, it would have to be in the name of the French king, and that this might be difficult. Alternatively they could be financially redeemed from service in the galleys, but this came up against the fact there were hundreds of them and Longlée did not enjoy a great surplus of wealth. He promised he would do what he could to assist those who could redeem themselves from the galleys. The following month four Nantais merchant ships were seized off the coast of Bilbao. They were found to be in possession of money which they were avoiding tax on. Henri entrusted Longlée with securing the pardon of the merchants and the return of the seized money. Longlée had little luck and in July no progress had been made. Even a year later in April 1585, the merchants situation was a matter of Longlée's correspondence. In a letter to Henri he explained the hopelessness of the situation. The merchants had violated the law through the undeclared nature of the money they were moving and this made things greatly challenging.

There was, according to Longlée, much harassment against the French in the Iberian peninsula. He reported in February 1584 that French captives in Lisboa had been cruelly hanged. He complained that the French were treated worse in the kingdoms than the 'Turk'.

Longlée reported in February 1584 that Spanish politics was very sensitive to the course of French domestic developments and thus prone to rapid fluctuations. He noted further that little was desired more in España than to see France return to civil war. A few months later, in April he observed that the Spanish would not consider providing support to those who would oppose the French king beyond the pale.

=== España through Longlée's eyes ===
The ambassador drew a portrait of the Spanish king for the French court. He described Felipe as ill inclined to hurry into a decision, a slowness Longlée found disconcerting. The Spanish king was of course also well served by his prudence, in such a way as to facilitate the establishment of stability in his kingdom. The many successes Felipe had enjoyed, in the ambassadors estimation, had given him a superiority complex with fantasies of a universal monarchy. Felipe wished to subordinate all other monarchies to his own. This was particularly true after he subdued Portugal to his control. During his audiences with Felipe he reported that the king showed good humour to him, but Longlée little trusted this and wished to penetrate behind the diplomatic façade of the king. He came to see Felipe as a hypocrite who professed friendship to Longlée's face, while working to support the Catholic ligue (league) and meddle in other ways covertly in France. He determines that Felipe saw the misfortune of his neighbours as his advantage and betterment. From 1584 the physical decline of Felipe featured in Longlée's correspondence, due to the gout of the king. He would describe Felipe various illnesses over the coming years, and outline how this weakened Felipe's capacity for affairs. Decades of work and age had worn greatly on Felipe in Longlée's estimation. It was in this old and weakened state, that Longlée saw the greatest possibility. Felipe for his part had distaste for both Henri's 'indecisive' policy, and for Longlée, who he offered state silence to. As a by-product of this, on occasion Henri was aware of an event in España before Longlée was.

Longlée had little taste for Felipe's ministers, the secretario Idiáquez, cardinal de Granvelle, the duca di Terranova (duke of Terranova), and the marqués de Santa-Cruz (marquis of Santa-Cruz) all favoured war with France. He explained to Henri on 29 February 1584 that their main driver towards war was to revenge themselves on the actions of the duc d'Alençon in Vlaanderen. They considered that Alençon's activities in Nederland could not be made without the approval of the French king and Catherine. Through waging a war on France a better and more favourable peace could be secured that provided security to Vlaanderen. Longlée wrote that there was also a faction of Felipe's council that favoured peace with France. This was on the grounds that Felipe should not light a fire in his neighbours house that could easily spread to his own, and further that an attack on France would unite the divisions in the French kingdom around opposition to the intervention of a foreigner. He evaluated the war party as enjoying the greatest authority, but found them to be the 'weakest in reason'. As a result, despite his fury at French actions in Vlaanderen and the French seizure of Cambrai, Felipe inclined towards peace as being more advantageous towards his affairs. With the death of Felipe Longlée anticipated affairs would collapse very promptly. In addition to these grievances, Longlée found the ministers interminably slow in coming to resolutions. Their deliberations were both secretive and delayed. Through this pensive approach, matters would be allowed to mature with time. According to Longlée they observed the actions of all foreigners, and in particular him with 'a hundred eyes'.

For the Spanish population at large, Longlée opined that they were 'vain and presumptuous'.

He wrote to Henri in April that Felipe would declare himself openly in favour of war if he saw a good prospect of 'seizing some good places'. Longlée was of the opinion that Henri, and the French kingdom possessed the ability to be an effective counterweight to España's ambitions of a universal empire. It was out of fear of this that Felipe sought to undermine the unity of France.

=== Rondela affair ===
As ambassador to España, Longlée was in the business of employing informants to aid in the gathering of information. He employed great caution in providing details about the men he relied on, as in a letter in May 1584 where he referred to them only as 'people worthy of faith'. The heavy surveillance his residence and office were kept under meant that many prospective informers were disincentivised from coming to him, a matter on which he complained in April 1585.

In July 1584 Longlée reported to Henri concerning a Portuguese spy named Rondela. This man had formally been an informant of Saint-Gouards and was a strong supporter of the Portuguese pretender to the throne dom António. In February Longlée had complained to Villeroy that the spy (who was then in his services) was not reliable, and had little access to information. Longlée was not however entirely wedded to this view, and in a letter to Henri in May praised the spy as a man who 'could be useful' and had great access to affairs.

He derived useful information from the agent, such as the interception of Spanish correspondence intended for the duc de Montmorency (duke of Montmorency) in 1584. Made aware of this information, Longlée informed Henri of the duc de Montmorency's treason in February 1584. He reported to Henri that Montmorency was a pensioner of the Spanish king, receiving 60,000 livres (pounds) annually so that he might further the disorders in Languedoc. The spy was alerted by troop movements, and feared an incoming invasion of France. Longlée unwisely maintained Rondela in his services despite the spy being distrusted by the Spanish. On 26 June, Rondela was thrown in prison, his papers being seized the following day. When, a few days later in prison, Rondela attempted to take his own life with a shard of glass he was found unconscious and nursed back to health under heavy guard. In a long letter to Henri written on 7 July the ambassador attempted to reassure Henri concerning the affair. He claimed he had heard no reports tying Rondela to his household. Longlée opined that perhaps Rondela knew Saint-Gouard in Konstantiniyye or Vlaanderen. As for relations with him, he protested that when he had met with the man it had been in public, as with many other men he was acquainted with. He derided Rondela as being imprudent and incautious. He assured Henri that nothing could tarnish the king by this affair.

Longlée wrote that only two men knew of the visits he had enjoyed with Rondela. He requested Henri send him 600 écus for the purpose of buying Rondela's silence. In September 1585 he reported with great relief that in Rondela's final days (he had been sentenced to death) he had not incriminated his relationship with the French government.

=== Montmorency's treason ===
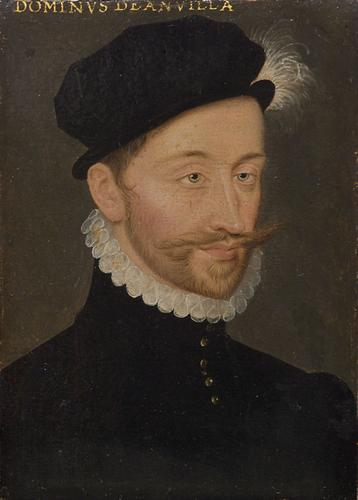
Duc de Montmorency who engaged in treasonous dealings with Felipe II to cause troubles in southern France in exchange for subsidies

Longlée continued to provide information on the Spanish contacts with Montmorency throughout 1584. In April he reported that the virrey de Catalunya (viceroy of Catalunya) served as both a negotiator for the arrangement between Felipe and Montmorency, and also a conduit for the communications. Longlée saw Barcelona as the centre of operations, from which all money was dispatched and some of the troops. The ambassador implored Henri to provide him with funds so that he could hire an agent in Barcelona, arguing he would receive great utility from such. In the despatch of April he reported further that a new sum of money has been sent to Montmorency. The affair was, according to Longlée 'hard to believe', that great seigneurs in France would take up arms for the interests of the king of España, but he had evidence. In May he explained that the duca di Savoia was involved in these Spanish intrigues. Savoia received 300,000 écus (crowns) from Felipe which he was to provide Montmorency as appropriate to the situation. Longlée remarked further that it was obvious that Savoia saw potential for his own profit through his involvement. In June he explained that his source of information for the sums of money that came to Montmorency were the Genevans at the Spanish court who were responsible for handling the money and various ambassadors he was friendly with. Montmorency for his part in Longlée's estimation had a joint priority of disturbing the tranquillity of France and of amassing as much money from Felipe as he could.

In May 1585 Longlée would again report on a shipment to Montmorency from the duca di Savoia. This time for a sum of 50,000 écus d'or (gold crowns). Later that year in November he wrote that Montmorency was looking to conclude a treaty with Felipe by which he betrayed Narbonne to the Spanish king. He wrote to the king in this month in an un-encrypted portion of a despatch that he intended to visit the Monestir de Montserrat (monastery of Montserrat) to undertake his devotions. In the encoded part of the correspondence he explained that Felipe was going to be negotiating the deal with Montmorency at this location and that he intended to pry on this process as best as he could. Though negotiations between Felipe and Montmorency would continue they were weakened by the death of cardinal de Granvelle (who had been their architect) in September 1586. That same month, Longlée reported that a commander of the Order of Malta named Juan de Moreo who was in Felipe's employ, had been sent to meet with Montmorency.

=== Navarre's treason ===
At the same time as he reported on the dealings of Montmorency with Felipe, he explained there were also negotiations being undertaken with the Spanish king by the Protestant king of Navarre. He explained to Henri in April 1584 that Felipe's design in these contacts was to induce a new civil war in the kingdom. Juan de Moreo was employed for the purpose of Felipe's negotiations with Navarre. The ambassador gave a detailed description of Moreo so that Henri might have him arrested. He would again report to the French crown that Moreo was undertaking negotiations in Languedoc and Navarre in March 1585, by April however he determined that Moreo had ceased to negotiate with Navarre.

In April 1584, he first mentioned in his correspondence with Henri the Spanish project of the Invincible Armada which was to assault England. This would be a dominant subject in his correspondence for the next four years being mentioned in 62 of his letters from 1584 to the defeat of the Armada in July 1588.

=== Death of Alençon ===
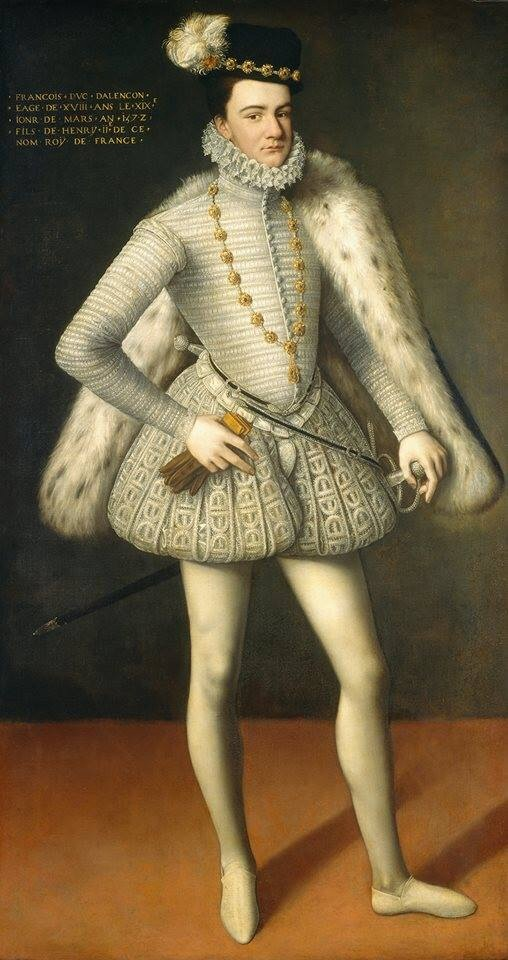
Duc d'Alençon, brother to Henri III, heir to the French throne from 1574 to 1584, whose death triggered a succession crisis

On 10 June 1584, the king's brother the duc d'Alençon died. This did remove for España the chief inciter of disorders in Spanish Vlaanderen. However it was not a balm to relations between France and España for several reasons. Felipe feared that with Alençon's death, the French policy in Nederland would transfer to being that of the French king. Henri could assemble a larger force for the project than his brother had, and potentially reunite his kingdom around the prosecution of a foreign war. Beyond this Alençon had been, in the absence of a son for Henri, the heir to the French throne. The European Catholic party made the assumption that Henri III would die without producing an heir of his own. Thus according to Salic Law the succession defaulted on the king's distant Protestant cousin the king of Navarre. This represented a new setback for Felipe and the Catholic party. In addition to this, Navarre would be motivated to favour his co-religionists in Spanish Nederland, and prosecute for the reclamation of those parts of the kingdom of Navarre which were under Spanish control. Henri hoped that his cousin would see the wisdom of converting to Catholicism. On 30 June Longlée reports receipt of the news of the duc d'Alençon's death. He informed Henri that word of the death was greeted with great sadness and mourning by 'all good people'. Ambassadors in Madrid had come to him to offer their condolences. Felipe and his daughters expressed to Longlée their regret at the loss for Christianity of such a 'generous prince'. Festivities in Madrid were also cancelled for the occasion. This reaction was essentially a superficial formal one. In the encoded portion of his despatch, Longlée reported that there was much fear of the disadvantage that could be brought by the death, particularly as related to the Spanish recovery of Cambrai which would be more challenging if it was held by Catherine or Henri. Felipe would, in Longlée's estimation, use any means available from negotiation to force of arms to see the return of Cambrai to his possession.

He wrote a further despatch to Henri clarifying the reaction to the death on 7 July. Felipe viewed the death with considerable displeasure due to its potential to restore unity in France. A few weeks later he advised Henri not to be adverse to seizing the opportunity as related to Spanish Nederland. If the Dutch States threw themselves into the arms of Henri, he noted that Felipe was old and his son was still a child. For Felipe the stability of his kingdoms now depended on affairs in Vlaanderen.

=== Catholic ligue ===
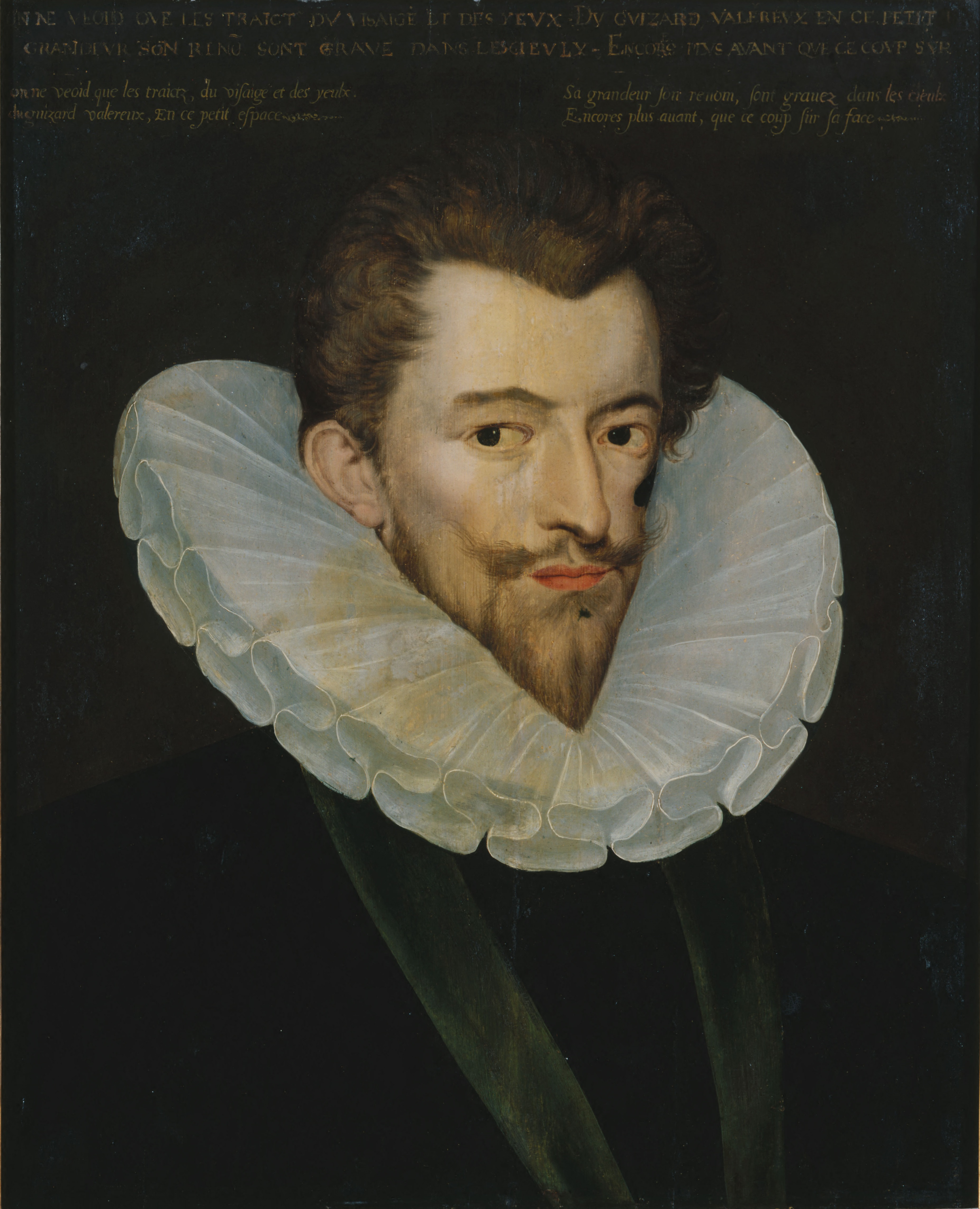
Duc de Guise and leader of the French Catholic ligue

The Spanish crown had great interest in the progress of the French Catholic ligue (Catholic League). Links between Felipe and the ligue were particularly furthered after the death of the duc d'Alençon. Having entered contact with the duc de Guise (who led the militant Catholic party) in 1577, the Spanish king's ambassador Juan de Vargas Mexia conducted an interview with the prince in April 1578. From 1582, Guise was in receipt of financial support from España. Relations with the powerful duc were maintained by the Spanish ambassador in France, Mendoza who had been expelled from England for his involvement in a plot against queen Elizabeth. For España there was much to gain through support of the Catholic ligue in France: avoidance of a Protestant king ascending the French throne, the ability to bring about the splintering of a kingdom which had so defied Felipe over the crisis of Portuguese succession and finally if France were weakened, Spanish control over Cambrai could be resumed.^{α} In August 1584, Longlée reported that a party had been formed with various Italian bankers in España, so that the Spanish ambassador in France, the conde de Villamediana (count of Villamediana) might receive 80,000 écus to employ to an unknown end. In addition to his support for the Catholic ligue, Felipe also looked to forward his own daughter's rights, come the death of Henri III and set his lawyers to work to this end.

In August 1584, Longlée reported to Villeroy that Felipe had begun to explore the possibility that his daughter Isabel (granddaughter of Henri II and Catherine) would have the rights to the duché de Bretagne (duchy of Bretagne) should Henri III die without a child. The prospect shocked Longlée and in a letter to Henri in February 1586 he described it as impertinent and presumptuous, and that several strong legal minds were working on the case at the Spanish court. In September 1586 he elaborated that these legal minds were not only concerned with Bretagne but were making a broader case for the rights of Isabel should Henri die without an heir. To further this plan, Felipe undertook the services of a Franciscan named Jacques de Sainte-Marie, who was to begin to broach the possibility of the infanta Isabel's succession to Bretagne with the seigneurs of the region. Longlée spoke with the Franciscan in the hopes of gathering more details. He was unable to acquire the names of those he had spoken with, however one of the principal figures would have been the duc de Mercœur who offered limited covert support for the ligue during the period 1584–1588. With a potential hold on Brest, Felipe had the further prospect of enjoying not only a resting point on the route to Vlaaderen, but also a staging ground for an invasion of England.

In his first audience with Henri on 15 November 1584, Mendoza offered Felipe's condolences for the recent passing of the king's brother Alençon. Meeting again with Henri the next day, the French king expressed his hope to Mendoza that he would not follow the pattern of behaviour he had engaged in during his stay in England.

=== Treaty of Joinville ===
On 31 December 1584 an alliance was established at Joinville between the duc de Guise, duc de Mayenne, cardinal de Bourbon (represented by the sieur de Maineville), and the Spanish king Felipe (represented by the former ambassador Tassis and Juan de Moreo). It was agreed that Felipe would endorse the cardinal de Bourbon's claim to be Henri's heir - he was the king of Navarre's Catholic cousin - and provide 600,000 écus annually of financial aid to the Catholic ligueur cause. In return the ligueur princes would ensure the annihilation of Protestantism in France, see to it that the decisions of the Council of Trent were adopted in France and support Spanish designs in Nederland. The parties to the treaty were not to enter separate accords with the French king. By means of the treaty of Joinville, Felipe began a policy of interference in French domestic affairs that made him a key factor in French domestic policy. This was a further complication for Longlée's presence in España, where a king was fairly openly encouraging internal discord in France.

Due to a gap in Longlée's surviving correspondence from August 1584 to February 1585, it is unknown whether he was immediately aware of the secret treaty Felipe had negotiated and informed Henri. The French king regardless became aware promptly due to the indiscretions of the ligueur (leaguer) leadership. Longlée was definitely aware of the treaty by April 1585 and evoked it in his correspondence to the French king.

In January 1585 Catherine enjoyed an interview with the new Spanish ambassador to France. Mendoza had protested to her that no merit had been found to her claims to the Portuguese throne (through her descendance from the house of Boulogne). The queen mother explained to Longlée that in response to this she detailed all her titles to the Spanish ambassador. According to Catherine the Spanish ambassador was left stunned by this and could say little but to enquire why she had not explicated on her rights before this point. Catherine entrusted Mendoza with explaining what Catherine had imparted to Felipe and to see to her receipt of just compensation for the 'robbery of her kingdom'. She added that if Felipe had accented to a marriage for the late duc d'Alençon this could have well served as a worthy compensation.

Another French vessel, this time of Saint-Malo was subject to seizure by the Spanish in February 1586. After two years, in 1588, Longlée was able to report with pride that he had succeeded in securing the release of the ship.

=== War with the ligue ===
Longlée was among the voices (alongside several sécretaires d'État) that warned Henri in March that the ligue was imminently going to take up arms against the crown. The ambassador informing the king that "plans had been prepared". The sécretaire Brûlart put a date of 6 April on a ligueur uprising, while the seigneur de Villeroy saw that the French ligueurs were supported by the Papacy and Spanish crown, and were mustering forces near Châlons to march on Paris.

In March the ligueur party assumed arms under the command of Guise. In response the Protestants assumed arms for their defence. From Péronne on 31 March they issued a manifesto in the name of the cardinal de Bourbon. The dangers of the Protestant king ascending to the throne were stressed in addition to a denouncement of the poor advisers the king kept company with. There were also more revolutionary themes infused in the movement.

On 4 April Longlée wrote to Henri that the former Spanish ambassador Tassis had been sent 70,000 écus from España with the intention that he employ them towards causing divisions in France. For the Spanish this was an end in itself according to Longlée. He stated that while he had been informed a year and a half back of dealings between Guise and España, which he had touched on as regards the dealings of Villemediana, he desired to have firm basis for writing on the matter before imparting the information to Henri. He bemoaned a couple of weeks later that even those he had who were best informed could not penetrate information due to the thickness of the 'fog'. Around the end of the month he complained that Spanish affairs were conducted by so few people and in such secrecy that no one else had any better idea what was going on than he did.

At this time, Longlée had travelled to Zaragoza to join with Felipe who was in the city for the undertaking of the Cortes. As with the other diplomats he was ordered to go to Madrid and not continue with Felipe on his visit to Barcelona and Valencia. Unable to join with Felipe, Longlée entrusted an agent to stay with the king and keep him appraised of all his moves.

Writing from Zaragoza on 14 April, Longlée informed the French king of the recent arrival of an agent of the vicomte de Duras (the viscount of Duras) in the city, alongside a 'Spaniard from the border'. They reported to the Spanish court on the status of the ligueur party in the south of France and particularly in Gascogne. It was announced to Idiáquez that Guise's plans were at a matured state. Duras and much of the nobility of Gascogne were with him for the defence of the Catholic religion. So much was this the case that they outnumbered the partisans of the Protestant king of Navarre in the province. Longlée denounces in particular the complicity of the governor of Brouage, the seigneur de Lanssac; and the governor of one of the châteaux of Bordeaux (Trompette), the seigneur de Vaillac. The presence of these men in España was to the end of receiving military and financial support for the ligueur cause. The man sent by Duras likely also sought to gain Felipe's support for the queen of Navarre against her husband, through the provision of 50,000 écus as per the duc de Guise's suggestion. He concluded his correspondence by reminding the king of Felipe's desire to foster divisions in France be it by supporting the Catholic ligue or the Protestants, so that he might either recover Cambrai, 'surprise some other place' or carry out his designs against England. He reassured the king that these plans would not succeed (in part due to the loyalty of his 'good subjects' - as opposed to the ligueurs), and Felipe's evil plans would rather fall back against him.

On 23 April, he reported that he understood the money to have been sent to Hondarribia on the French border and that this money would 'without doubt' be put towards the ligueur cause in France. He regaled the French king with the history of the Lorraine princes treason, which according to Longlée reached back four to five years ago, and reached their culmination after the death of Alençon. He expressed his lack of surprise that Felipe was financially supporting those who rose up against the king, and stated the Spanish king would consider it a good investment if it caused division in France. Felipe's treaty with the ligueurs was not the business of a man who operated by chance.

=== Mendoza's intrigues ===
On 3 May 1585, Longlée wrote to Henri, advising him to be cautious concerning the Spanish ambassador in France. The ambassador characterised him as an instrument of the faction that conspired against the state (i.e. the Catholic ligue). Le Roux agrees with Longlée's assessment of the Spanish ambassador, arguing that for Mendoza his assignment was that of a soldier conducting a war. Henri was also informed by his ambassador that Guise had been receiving money from the Spanish king for two years, but Longlée had been reluctant to inform the king of this, struggling to believe such treason could be possible.

In his July audiences with Felipe, Longlée protested, in Henri's name, of the support Felipe was proffering to the king's enemies, but received only vague replies. He had no ability to influence the policy of the Spanish king. Felipe tasked his secretario Idiáquez with lying to Longlée. The secretario informed the ambassador that the rumours of Spanish support for the ligue were manufactured by the king's enemies. In fact Felipe had good will towards Henri according to Idiáquez.

Negotiations were undertaken between the French crown, represented by Catherine and the Catholic ligue. Villeroy bemoaned to Longlée in June his fears of the remoteness of the prospect of peace between the two parties. At the same time, Longlée reported that Felipe was to provide 100,000 écus to the ligueur party every month.

Guise and Mendoza corresponded directly from summer 1585, with the former urging the ambassador to see to the acceleration of the king of Navarre's excommunication. Guise also requested Mendoza deliver the subsidies that had been agreed at Joinville.

In June 1586 Longlée reported on his hopes for the establishment of a favourable candidate as the French consul in Lisboa. He explained to Villeroy that his choice for the office was a 'good and useful servant' of the French king from whom much could be expected. The man had the further advantages of being a good negotiator and faithful in his disposition.

In July, Catherine achieved success in securing a treaty with the domestic Catholic ligue by the means of the treaty of Nemours. It represented a great triumph for the cause of the ligue, with even Protestant freedom of conscience suppressed. Nevertheless, Felipe was perturbed, as its signing violated a term of the treaty of Joinville by which separate dealings with the French king were prohibited.

=== Duras affair ===
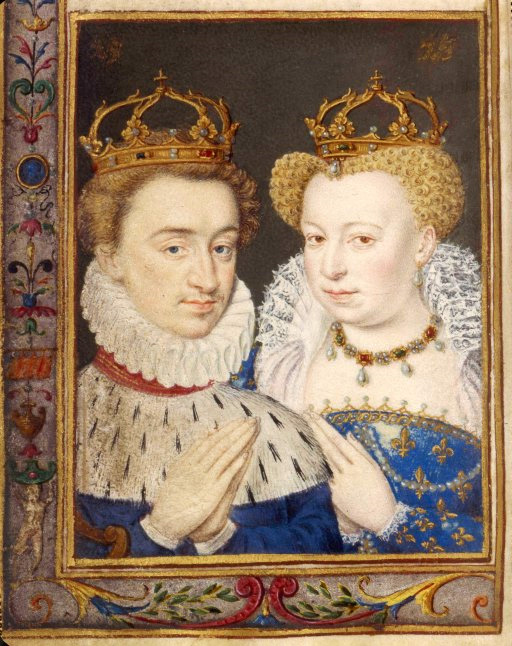
Protestant King of Navarre and the Catholic queen of Navarre who would intrigue with Felipe against her husband through her agent the vicomte de Duras

Three representatives (the baron de Larboust, the sieur de Pin and the vicomte de Duras) of the queen of Navarre arrived in España for secret negotiations with the Spanish king in August. These men sought to secure from Felipe military and financial backing to wage war in Béarn against Protestantism. This appealed to Felipe who saw it as a useful attack on Navarre. Having discovered of their covert arrival, Longlée quickly demonstrated to them that their cover was blown by sending a representative to meet with them and offer Longlée's services to them during their stay in the country. His knowledge of their movements was very intimate including details about their audiences with Felipe. Ribera postulates this means he had a very highly placed informant on the affair. Longlée sent a second representative to inform Duras of his displeasure, after which the covert envoy feigned illness to avoid leaving his residence. Despite this, Longlée remained aware of continued dealings between Duras and the secretario Idiáquez, making sure that everyone else shared his awareness by spreading the information. He boasted of this in a letter in August 1585. Duras was at least partly successful in his negotiations according to a letter of Longlée's in September.

The queen of Navarre, having fortified Agen, made attacks on Tonneins and Villeneuve during the summer of 1585 upon the advice of the duc de Guise. Henri tasked the maréchal de Matignon with driving her from Agen, however before he could arrive she was chased from the city on 25 September.

In October Duras returned to España for further negotiations, Longlée believed to the end of securing the provision of money for the queen of Navarre. He protested to Felipe not to receive Duras, but the representative was able to continue his negotiations. Duras complained to Idiáquez about the close surveillance he was kept under by the French ambassador, letting the secretario know that Longlée must have a great number of spies in the Spanish court. As he reported in November, the negotiations Duras was undertaking were fundamentally against the king of Navarre. He would later report that Duras had departed with 12,000 écus in January 1586. Longlée recounted for Henri the interview that Duras had undertaken with Felipe. He explained that Duras presented to Felipe the ligueur cause as being for the 'establishment of good government' and avoid the perils that were threatened by Henri's decision to have as heir an 'enemy of the church' (i.e. a Protestant). Further he reported that the ligue endeavoured to support Felipe with any enterprise he might undertake against Béarn or Basse-Navarre.

=== Sedition of Mendoza ===
Returning to the subject of the Spanish ambassador in France in October, Longlée reported to his sovereign that Mendoza desired the instigation of 'perpetual war' between the king's subjects. He sarcastically remarked that this was all one could expect from the ambassadors 'friendship'. He informed the king that some Spanish ministers saw the inducement of troubles inside France as a suitable revenge for French activities in Nederland. At the same time he reported to the French crown of a Spanish treasure fleet loaded down with around 12,000,000 écus worth of gold. A couple years later he would make a similar report on the activities of Spanish treasure fleets.

The ambassador expressed his belief in December 1585 to Villeroy, that Henri, and the Catholic nobility were all committed to the destruction of Protestantism and the suppression of rebellion in the kingdom.

Longlée was greatly desirous to know the details of Spanish preparations for a naval expedition against England. He spoke proudly in March 1586 to Henri of the quality of the informants he had on preparations for the operation from ports such as Lisboa. Among the informants he boasted in Spanish ports would have been French merchants, this was true of Breton merchants who resided in Bilbao.

Longlée again stressed Mendoza's seditious role in France in April 1586, arguing to Henri that the Spanish representative was fostering seditions to bring about the ruin of the French state, and prepare the kingdom to operate as a launching point for an invasion of England. Indeed, the governor of Calais, the seigneur de Gourdon was on board with the Spanish ambitions in this regard. In May, Longlée reported to Henri that Mendoza had received 100,000 écus which he was to use to buy the allegiance of French seigneurs. The ambassador explained that rather than force of arms, Felipe intended to recover Cambrai through the injection of such money. From this point on the French ambassador campaigned to get Henri to secure the dismissal of Mendoza. In addition to the money funnelled to Mendoza, 400,000 écus had according to Longlée entered France through Hondarribia. A little while later in July he wrote to Henri that the French king could clearly see the game Felipe was playing to induce discord in France. In October he wrote to the sécretaire d'État Villeroy to argue that Mendoza was inciting seditions against the king. For the Spanish king, all troubles and discords in neighbouring realms were opportunities for his benefit according to Longlée.

The English ambassador in France, Edward Stafford became a conduit for contact between the Spanish and the duc de Guise during 1586. In April, Guise provided Stafford 3,000 écus as compensation for information that Stafford had imparted to him. In July 1587, Felipe warned his agent in France, Mendoza, that Longlée had become aware of the meetings the Spanish ambassador undertook with Stafford, and that while he desired continuity in the employ of the English that Mendoza should take care to do so with subtlety.

=== Abortive replacement ===
In 1586, the marquis de Poigny was selected to replace Longlée as ambassador to the Spanish court, however he was never sent to España and thus Longlée remained at his post. He had been hopeful at the prospect that he might be relieved.

During September the ambassador reported of the 'more lively than ever' communications that were being conducted between the duc de Guise and the Spanish agent Juan de Moreo. Moreo had come to Champagne on the pretext that he was heading for Vlaanderen.

Writing to Villeroy in October 1586, Longlée regaled the sécretaire with the history of Mendoza's ambassadorship to France. He explained how in conversation with the Spanish secretario Idiáquez he had complained that Mendoza might cause grief to Henri (given his recent expulsion from England), but had been reassured he was only in the country temporarily to offer his condolences for the recent passing of the duc d'Alençon. Since that time they had born the many wicked actions of Mendoza without protest to the Spanish. The only protest they wished to make to Felipe was to relieve the king of his ambassador. He urged Henri to make a strong case for the ambassadors removal so that Felipe would take it seriously. If no such case was made, he argued the only circumstance in which Felipe would remove his ambassador would be if he went blind. This letter was followed by another a couple of weeks later in which he accused Mendoza of wishing to 'conspire against the state, incite rebellion and induce people to attack the king's person.

On 24 November 1587, the duc de Guise triumphed over an invading army of German reiters at the battle of Auneau. Longlée summarised the Spanish reaction to this victory of the royalist cause. In the un-encoded part of his letter he stated that there was much jubilation and praise of Henri. In the encoded segment he explained that Henri's success did not deliver the expected reaction in España. He felt that the main effect would be a more cautious pursuit of the Spanish designs against France.

=== Barricades and Armada ===
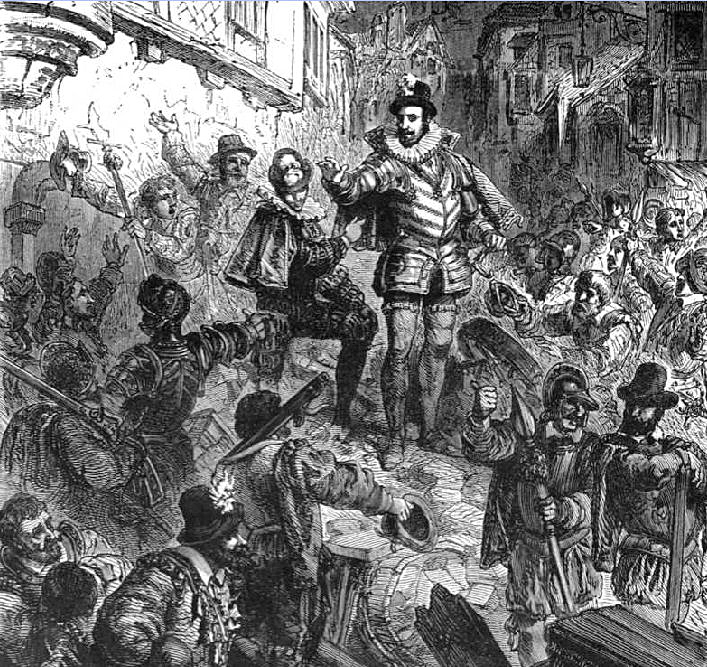
Duc de Guise leading the action during the Day of the Barricades

In February 1588, Longlée wrote that the Spanish ambassador endeavoured to foster evil and division in the realms he found himself in. He would diminish Henri's prestige if allowed to. In addition to accusing the ambassador of being 'pernicious' and 'insolent' Longlée suggested the ambassador was responsible for the poor relations between Henri and the English queen Elizabeth.

It would only be through the despatch of the Spanish ambassador in France, Mendoza, that Longlée learned of the seismic Day of the Barricades by which Henri was driven out of Paris by the ligueur party. He wrote to Villeroy that this had been the only source of information he had on the affair in June, he would not write to the king on the matter, Ribera speculates this may have been to avoid embarrassing the sovereign. Entirely unaware of these events in May, he was writing to the French court on Felipe's continued support for the Catholic ligue.

Longlée reported to the French court on the movements of the Spanish Armada. By the means of inducing division in the country, España hoped to be able to execute the Armada without worrying about the prospect of interference from the French, this was at least Longlée's understanding in March. Longlée was quite correct in the hostile intentions of Mendoza to the French crown, in July the ambassador sent funds to the duc d'Aumale in the hopes that he would seize useful towns in Picardie that could serve as staging grounds for the invasion of England. Aumale would have success in this endeavour, capturing Doullens and Le Crotoy.

From July 1588 through to March 1590, the despatches of Longlée are not preserved.

By 1589, Longlée was the only man of the church of Henri's foreign ambassadors. This was a significant contrast with the diplomatic situation of the kingdom on the death of Henri II, where 66% of the crowns ambassadors were men of the church.

=== Assassination of the duc de Guise ===
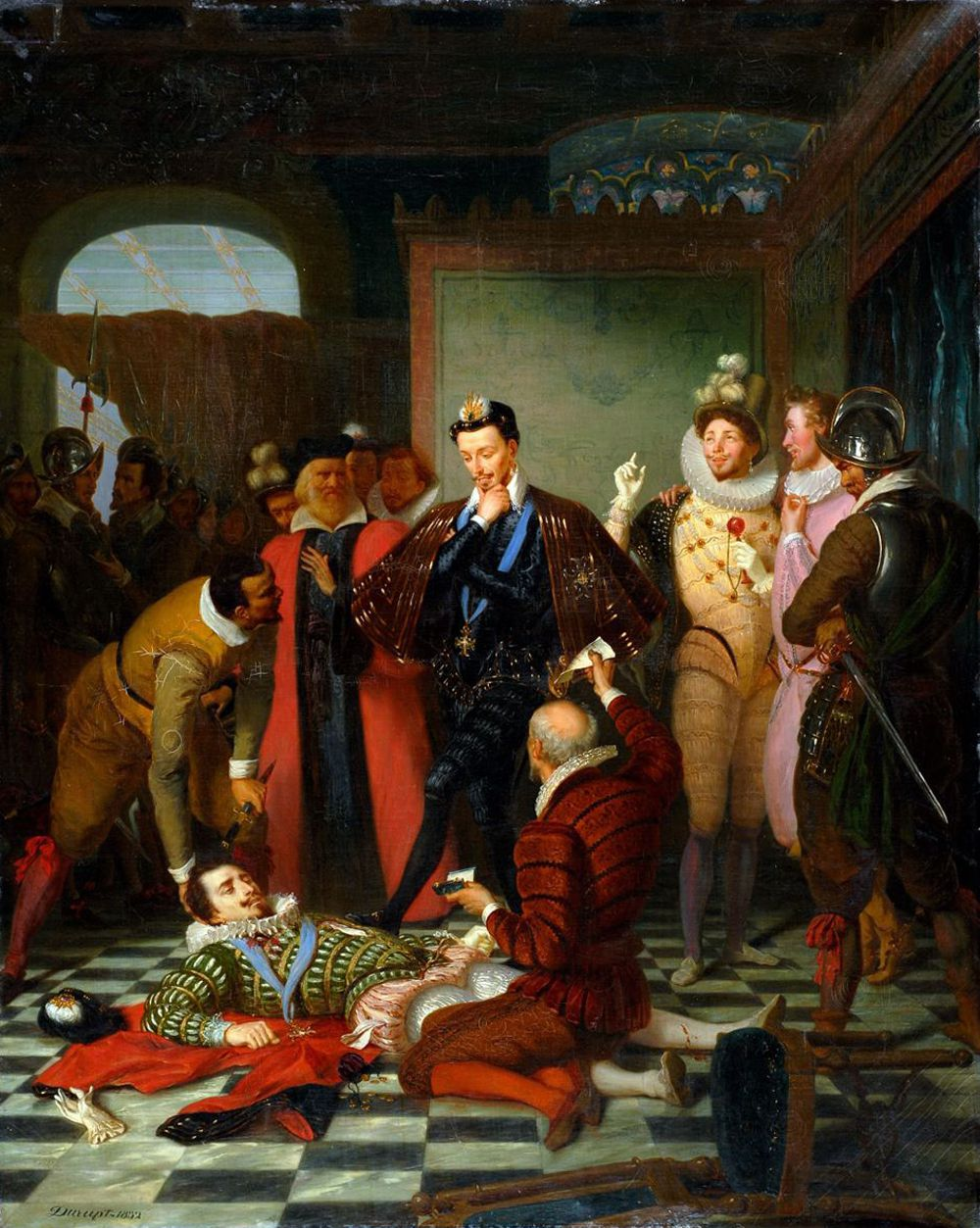
Henri stands over the body of the duc de Guise

In December 1588, Henri resolved that he could no longer bare the duc de Guise, and had him (and his brother) assassinated. These killings induced a rebellion against the crown by the ligue, now led by Guise's brother the duc de Mayenne. The Spanish ambassador Mendoza began openly collaborating with Mayenne in ligueur held Paris. Henri protested to Felipe and made requests for his recall, while assuring the Spanish king that he did not desire the outbreak of war between their two kingdoms. Such a war would have been impractical, given the civil war that raged inside France. In April 1589, Henri entered into alliance with his Protestant heir the king of Navarre against the ligue, thus providing valuable arguments to his ligueur opponents and Felipe. That same month he sent an extraordinary ambassador named de Fresnes to España. This would be the only extraordinary ambassador sent to the country, during Longlée's tenure. Ribera draws a connection between his dispatch and the king's new alliance with his heir Navarre. The purpose of his visit was to protest against Spanish seizures of French shipping and discuss the Portuguese question with Felipe. Ribera argues these may have been secondary priorities for de Fresnes, whose principal purpose was to ensure Felipe remained officially neutral in the civil war. To this end the extraordinary ambassador was even to offer Cambrai to the Spanish king. Gellard speculates de Fresnes may have initially been intended as a new ordinary ambassador to relieve Longlée, however this did not come to pass. De Fresnes had been sent with unrealistic offers, and his negotiations achieved little.

After the assassination of Henri III, Longlée transferred his allegiance to the king's Protestant heir the king of Navarre, who now styled himself Henri IV. Ribera describes the reasoning for his allegiance to the Protestant king as being one of 'loyalty'. The ascent of the Protestant king accentuated Longlée's fears about his situation in Madrid. He wrote to Henri that he had every reason to suspect that despatches addressed to him by the new king were being intercepted by the Spanish post-masters, as it had been many months since he had received correspondence from the king. He also observed the contempt he was held in and observation he was under had only increased. The fear of the Spanish even existed for him on a physical level at this point. Things went as far as for him to be considered a spy. He confided his fears in the governor of Bayonne and the lieutenant-general of Guyenne the maréchal (marshal) de Matignon.

== Reign of Henri IV ==
=== Man without a title ===
Felipe did not recognise Henri, and thus for him Longlée ceased to be the permanent representative of the French king in August 1589 and was untitled. Nevertheless, Longlée would stay in the country as his representative into 1590 before finally deciding to withdraw. He was encouraged in this by Henri, who wrote to him in November 1589, telling him to remain at his post so that the king could remain appraised of the Spanish king's policy, and look towards the securing of a marriage alliance between the two crowns. While this was fundamentally unrealistic, it served to buy Henri time through the illusion of regularised relations. Unable to attain anything from the Spanish except criticism from Felipe, Ribera expresses surprise that he was not expelled from the country. The historian describes Felipe's attitude towards Longlée's continued presence as an 'apparent passivity'.

=== Recall ===
In 1590 Longlée would send four surviving despatches to Henri. In March he explained to Henri that the ligueurs were adamant that Felipe should cease to tolerate his presence in España. The ligueurs also sought to gain a declaration of war from Felipe against Henri, with the Spanish king to garrison some towns. He advised that he would rather withdraw from the country on his own terms, than face the indignity of expulsion. Later that month he explained that the happy situation he had enjoyed in prior times, was ending. He explained that while he would do as best he could to continue in the country until Henri willed him return, there were dangers present. Again on 1 April he impressed upon Henri that it was clear he was not welcome in España, and that he daily awaited notice of his recall. This did not stop him from continuing to provide information to his king, and he explained the links between the duc de Mercœur and Felipe that threatened to inject forces into Bretagne. On 13 April he finally received his notice of recall from Henri. He effused to Henri concerning this that he would soon arrange for his departure back to France and that he would appear before Henri to give an account of the services he had rendered. He explained to Henri that anything that even hinted of the Protestant king was rejected in the Spanish court. He further reported on the Spanish reaction to Henri's recent victory at the battle of Ivry, which he remarked was very poor. In response to this, Longlée explained that Felipe looked to open several new fronts of the war against Henri, in the hopes of exhausting his abilities. Unable to financially support such a war, Henri's subjects would desert him.

=== Return to France ===
To assist him in his departure, Henri provided him a sum of 6,000 écus for the trip, and promised him receipt of a court office upon his return to France.

His residence in España had concluded by May 1590 and he was back in France during this month. He returned to a kingdom riven by division, Henri having just invested Paris for the third time, determined to starve out the ligueur held city. His old enemy the Spanish ambassador to France worked to boost the prospects of the besieged. Unlike many of his contemporary ambassadors to España he did not derive much reward for his service upon his return to France. Ribera offers a tripartite explanation for his failure to receive much in the way of reward: firstly he never held the title of ambassador despite his hopes, secondly his diplomatic career was far more discreet than that his predecessors had enjoyed, finally his return came during a period of dynastic upheaval.

That same month, the ligueur candidate for the throne, the cardinal de Bourbon died. With the absence of a successor, Felipe moved to push the claim of his daughter Isabel to the duché de Bretagne and throne of France. The prospect of Isabel's claim had been raised in the correspondence of Longlée years prior, and was now to be pursued seriously by the Spanish.

=== Limited reward and death ===
In May 1592 Longlée described himself as a gentilhomme ordinaire de la chambre du roi. He would hold court office until his death.

It is not exactly clear when Longlée died, however it was prior to 1598 when an inventory drawn up by his sister described him as dead.

== Notes ==
^α In 1581 Cambrai had come under the protection of the duc d'Alençon. In his will he bequeathed Cambrai to Henri and it would fall under the protection of Henri's mother Catherine.

== Sources ==
- Amalric, Jean-Pierre (2018). "Préface". Diplomatie et Espionnage: Les Ambassadeurs du Roi de France auprès de Philippe II - Du Traité du Cateau-Cambrésis (1559) à la mort de Henri III (1589). Classiques Garnier.
- Cloulas, Ivan (1979). Catherine de Médicis. Fayard.
- Gellard, Matthieu (2014). Une Reine Épistolaire: Lettres et Pouvoir au Temps de Catherine de Médicis. Classiques Garnier.
- Le Roux, Nicolas (2006). Un Régicide au nom de Dieu: L'Assassinat d'Henri III. Gallimard.
- Le Roux, Nicolas (2022). 1559-1629 Les Guerres de Religion. Gallimard.
- Ribera, Jean-Michel (2018). Diplomatie et Espionnage: Les Ambassadeurs du Roi de France auprès de Philippe II - Du Traité du Cateau-Cambrésis (1559) à la mort de Henri III (1589). Classiques Garnier.
- Sutherland, Nicola (1962). The French Secretaries of State in the Age of Catherine de Medici. The Athlone Press.
