= Château of Moulinvieux =

- Château de Moulinvieux, Moulinvieux
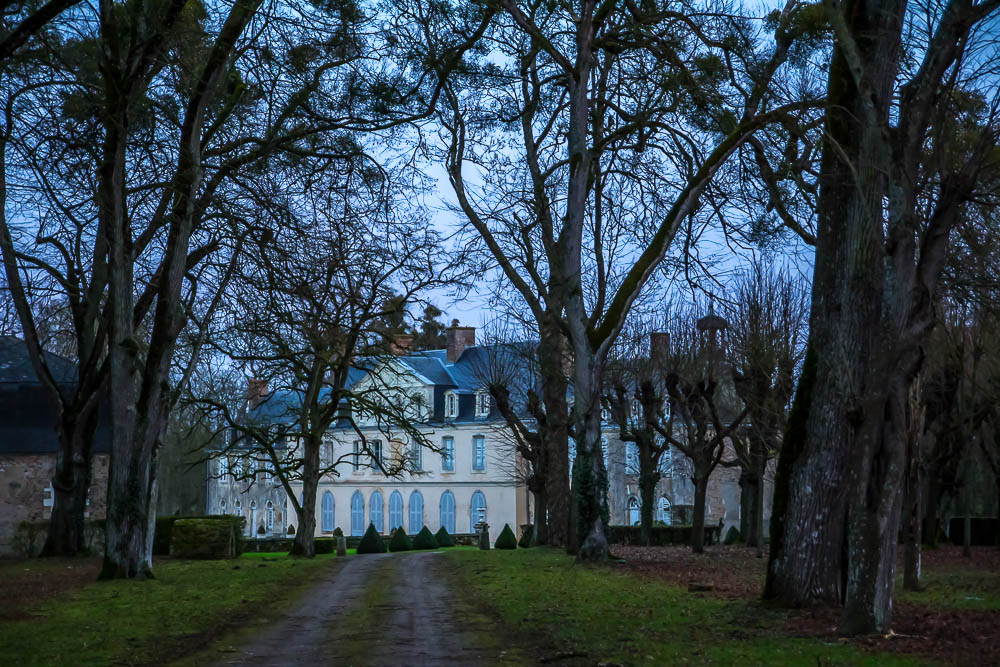
- Interactive map of the Château of Moulinvieux area

General information
- Architectural style: Classical
- Location: Asnières-sur-Vègre, Sarthe, Pays de la Loire, Maine France
- Coordinates: 47.89194°N 0.23333°W

Château of Moulinvieux is a château built in the 17th century at Asnières-sur-Vègre in the departement of Sarthe, France. Parts of it are listed as monuments historiques.

== Architecture ==
The central part of the lodge was built during the 17th century. It was rebuilt and extended with the side extensions, the interieur decorations (paintings, sculptures, woodwork), Our Lady’s Chapell and the garden were made in the 18th century.

== Protection ==
The castle and the park of Moulinvieux are listed as monuments historiques since 14 December 1989.
