= Asnières-sur-Vègre =

- Commune
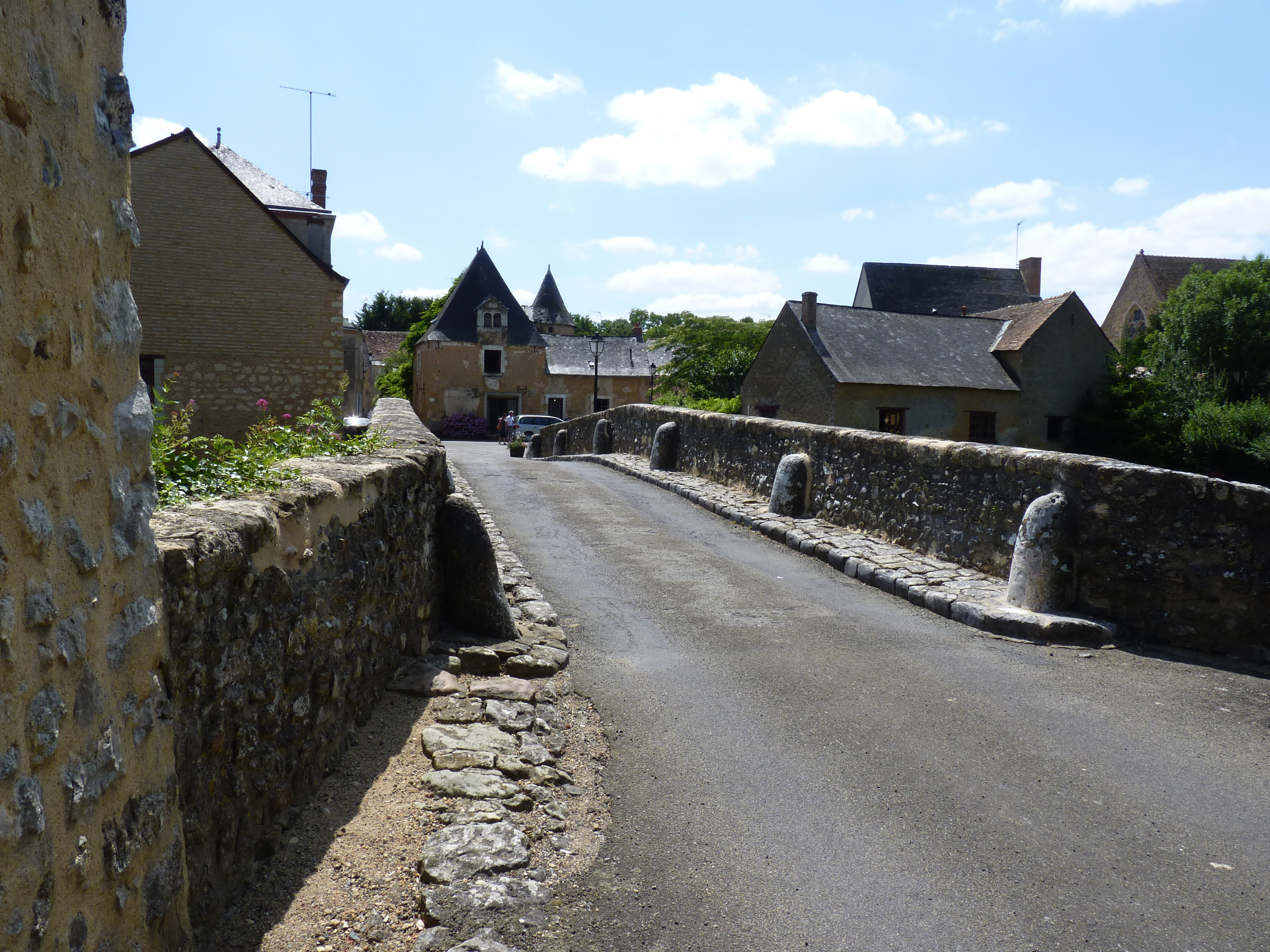
- The old bridge

- Coat of arms
- Location of Asnières-sur-Vègre
- Location within France Location within Pays de la Loire
- Coordinates: 47°53′22″N 0°13′59″W
- Country: France
- Region: Pays de la Loire
- Department: Sarthe
- Arrondissement: La Flèche
- Canton: Sablé-sur-Sarthe
- Intercommunality: CC Pays Sabolien

Government
  - Mayor (2020–2026): Jean-Louis Lemarie
- Area^{1}: 12.64 km^{2} (4.88 sq mi)
- Highest elevation: 75 m (246 ft)
- Lowest elevation: 30 m (98 ft)
- Population (2023): 331
  - Density: 26.2/km^{2} (67.8/sq mi)
- Demonym(s): Asniérois, Asniéroise
- Time zone: UTC+01:00 (CET)
  - Summer (DST): UTC+02:00 (CEST)
- INSEE/Postal code: 72010 /72430
- ^{1} French Land Register data, which excludes lakes, ponds, glaciers > 1 km^{2} (0.386 sq mi or 247 acres) and river estuaries.

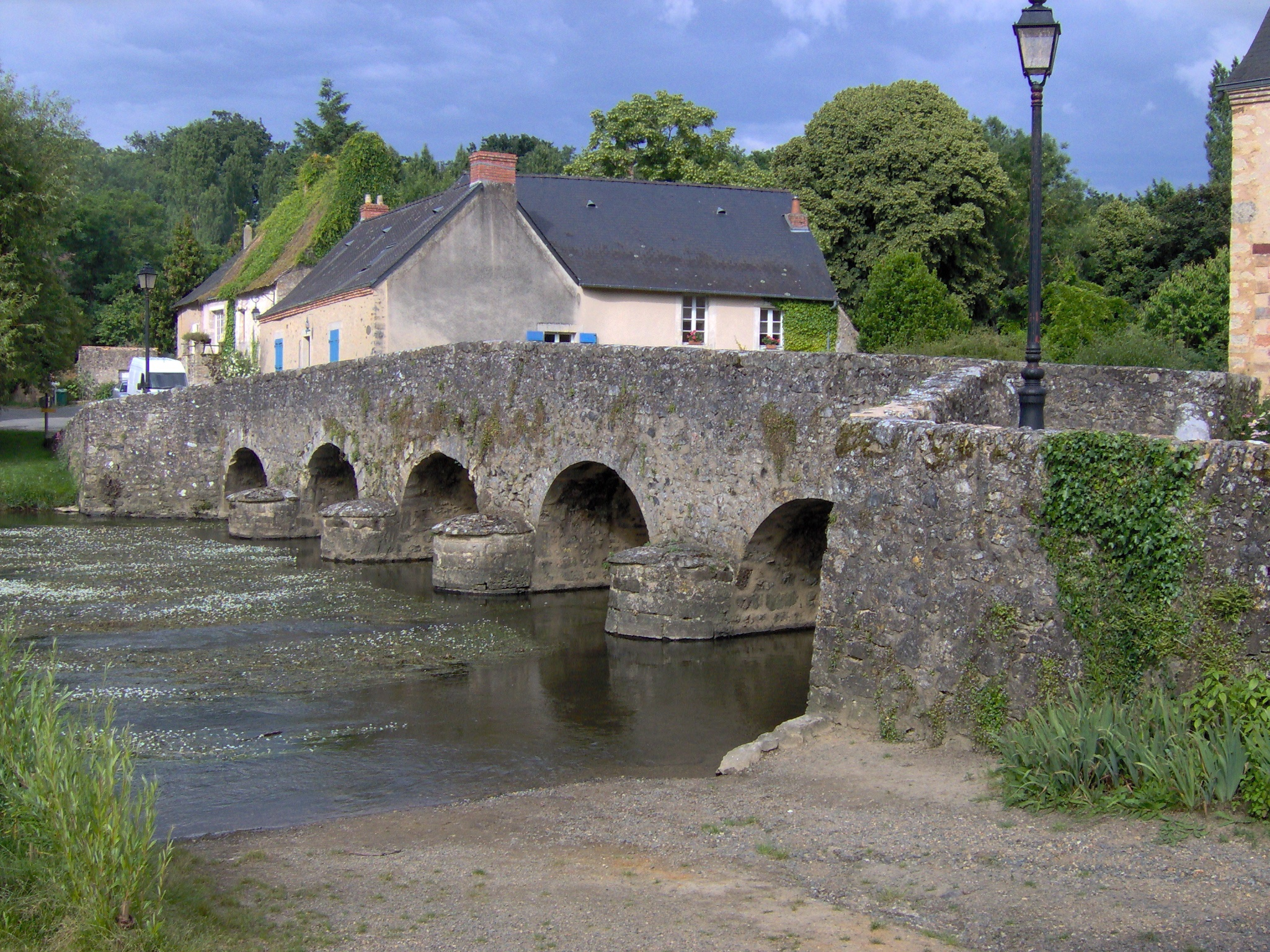
The bridge at Asnières

Asnières-sur-Vègre (French pronunciation: [ɑnjɛʁ syʁ vɛɡʁ]; literally "Asnières on Vègre") is a commune in the Sarthe department in the region of Pays de la Loire in north-western France.

== See also ==
- Château of Moulinvieux
- Communes of the Sarthe department
