= Canton of Pleumartin =

Coordinates: 46°45′57″N 0°45′26″E

Pleumartin
- Former canton
- Interactive map of Pleumartin
- Country: France
- Region: Nouvelle-Aquitaine
- Department: Vienne
- No. of communes: {{{nbcomm}}}
- Disbanded: 2015
- Area: 252.39 km^{2} (97.45 sq mi)
- Population (2012): 6,744
  - Density: 26.72/km^{2} (69.21/sq mi)

The Canton of Pleumartin is a former canton situated in the Vienne département of France. It was disbanded following the French canton reorganisation which came into effect in March 2015. It had a total of 6,744 inhabitants (2012, without double counting).

== Composition ==
The Canton of Pleumartin comprised 9 communes:

- Chenevelles
- Coussay-les-Bois
- Leigné-les-Bois
- Lésigny
- Mairé
- Pleumartin
- La Puye
- La Roche-Posay
- Vicq-sur-Gartempe

== Demography ==
Historical population
Year	Pop.	±%
1962	6,658	—
1968	7,058	+6.0%
1975	6,514	−7.7%
1982	6,351	−2.5%
1990	6,227	−2.0%
1999	6,215	−0.2%
2006	6,514	+4.8%
2012	6,744	+3.5%

== See also ==
- Arrondissement of Châtellerault
- Cantons of the Vienne department
- Communes of the Vienne department
