= Saint-Sauveur, Vienne =

Saint-Sauveur
- Part of Senillé-Saint-Sauveur
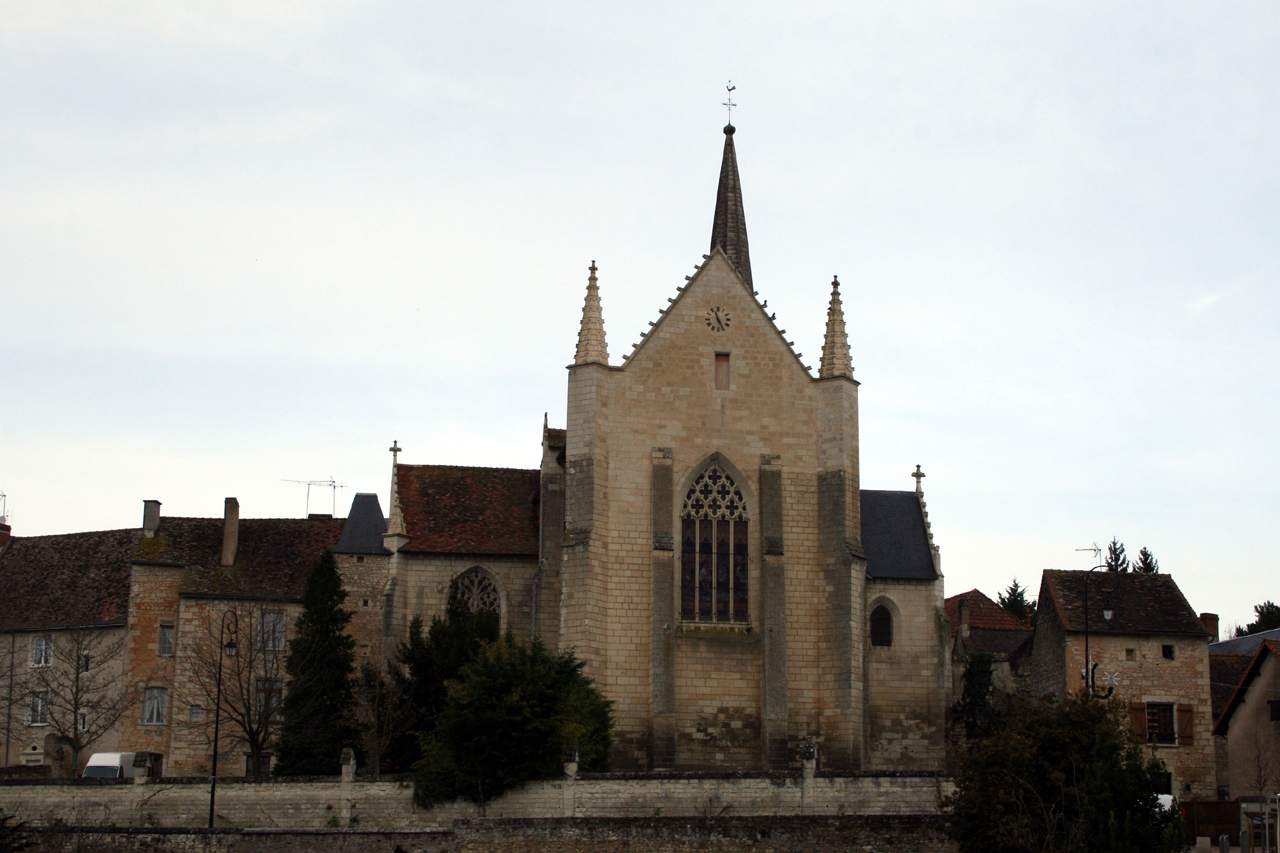
- The church of Saint-Sauveur
- Location of Saint-Sauveur
- Location within France Location within Nouvelle-Aquitaine
- Coordinates: 46°48′33″N 0°37′26″E
- Country: France
- Region: Nouvelle-Aquitaine
- Department: Vienne
- Arrondissement: Châtellerault
- Canton: Châtellerault-3
- Commune: Senillé-Saint-Sauveur
- Area^{1}: 32.37 km^{2} (12.50 sq mi)
- Elevation: 144 m (472 ft)
- Highest elevation: 144 m (472 ft)
- Lowest elevation: 72 m (236 ft)
- Population (2023): 965
  - Density: 29.8/km^{2} (77.2/sq mi)
- Time zone: UTC+01:00 (CET)
  - Summer (DST): UTC+02:00 (CEST)
- Postal code: 86100
- ^{1} French Land Register data, which excludes lakes, ponds, glaciers > 1 km^{2} (0.386 sq mi or 247 acres) and river estuaries.

Saint-Sauveur (French pronunciation: [sɛ̃ sovœʁ]) is a former commune in Vienne, a department in western France. On 1 January 2016, it was merged into the new commune Senillé-Saint-Sauveur.

== See also ==
- Communes of the Vienne department
