= Senillé =

Commune in Vienne, France

- Part of Senillé-Saint-Sauveur
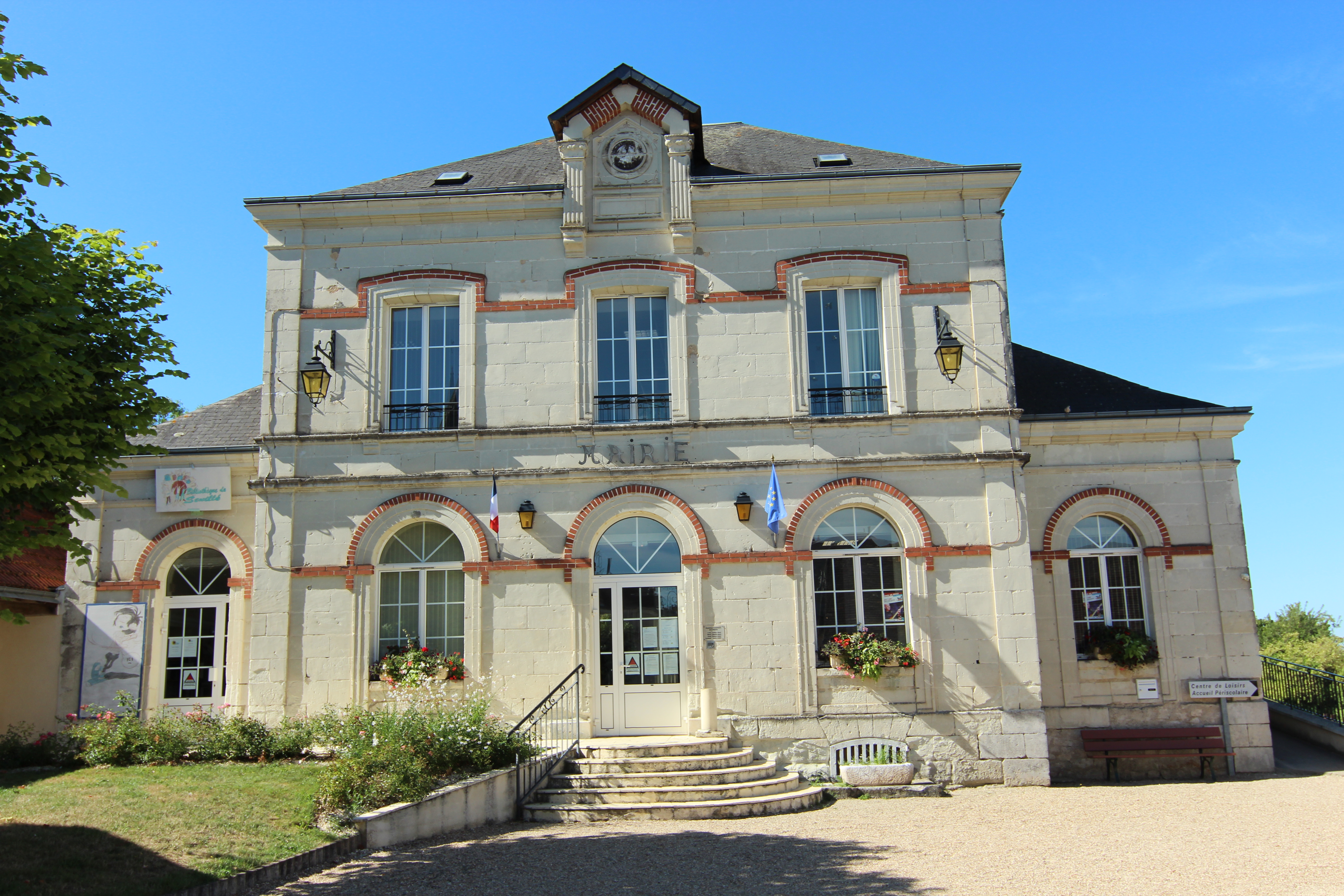
- Senillé Town hall
- Location of Senillé
- Location within France Location within Nouvelle-Aquitaine
- Coordinates: 46°46′47″N 0°36′56″E
- Country: France
- Region: Nouvelle-Aquitaine
- Department: Vienne
- Arrondissement: Châtellerault
- Canton: Châtellerault-3
- Commune: Senillé-Saint-Sauveur
- Area^{1}: 17.94 km^{2} (6.93 sq mi)
- Elevation: 102 m (335 ft)
- Highest elevation: 146 m (479 ft)
- Lowest elevation: 57 m (187 ft)
- Population (2023): 741
  - Density: 41.3/km^{2} (107/sq mi)
- Time zone: UTC+01:00 (CET)
  - Summer (DST): UTC+02:00 (CEST)
- Postal code: 86100
- ^{1} French Land Register data, which excludes lakes, ponds, glaciers > 1 km^{2} (0.386 sq mi or 247 acres) and river estuaries.

Senillé (French pronunciation: [sənije]) is a former commune in the Vienne department in western France. On 1 January 2016, it was merged into the new commune Senillé-Saint-Sauveur.

== See also ==
- Communes of the Vienne department
