= Lusignan (disambiguation) =

Lusignan can refer to:

- Lusignan dynasty, a European ruling family
  - Château de Lusignan, the seat of the lords of Lusignan in Lusignan, Vienne, France
- Lusignan, Vienne, a town in Vienne, France
  - Canton of Lusignan, a canton in Vienne, France
- Lusignan-Petit, a town in Lot-et-Garonne, France
- Lusignan, Guyana, a town in Guyana.
- Franz Joseph, Marquis de Lusignan, an Austrian general (1753-1832)
