= Junian of Mairé =

Saint Junian
- Born: France
- Died: 587; France
- Venerated in: Roman Catholic Church
- Feast: 13 August

Saint Junian (French: Saint Junien) was a 6th-century Christian hermit and abbot. He was the founder of Mairé, or Mariacum, Abbey at Mairé-Levescault in Poitou, France and is the patron saint of Poitou ploughmen.

He was born at the beginning of the 6th century, in 500 or 501, in the area of "Briosso" (now called Briançais or Brioux) near or on an estate named "Champagné" which still exists (Champagné-le-Sec), and close to the village of Mairé in the commune of Perigné, Deux-Sèvres.

He was educated by his parents who were part of the Gallo-Roman nobility. Although his name is undoubtedly of pagan origin, coming from the Roman gods Juno/Jupiter, he was dedicated to the service of God from his earliest childhood and was instructed in all the sacred and human sciences which were taught at that time.

Nothing else is known about his early life but as a young man, he lived a life of austerity as a hermit in a place called Bois Trappeau in the commune of Ardilleux in Deux-Sèvres.

Junian acquired disciples and in 559, King Clotaire I made him a gift of land on which to found a monastery dedicated to the rule of Saint Benoît - the religious community at Mairé-l'Evescault, south of Deux-Sèvres. This isolated place evoked memories of his childhood home and Junien named it "Mariacus" - subsequently "Mairé". The "L'Evescault" was added after a great religious festival in Poitiers to which Junien was invited by Queen Radagonde who raised him to the same rank as the other bishops or "Les Evêques". Hence the name Mairé-L'Evescault.

He remained a friend of Queen Radegund who herself founded the abbey of Sainte-Croix de Poitiers. Junian and Radegonde died on the same day, 13 August 587.

Junian's monastery at Mairé was partially destroyed during the wars of Pepin the Short and Charlemagne but survived for another thousand years. It was finally demolished during the French Revolution, the stone being re-used for local construction and the lands reverting to their farming origins.
