= Lésigny =

Lésigny is the name of two communes in France:

- Lésigny, Seine-et-Marne, Île-de-France
- Lésigny, Vienne, Poitou-Charentes
