= Senillé-Saint-Sauveur =

- Commune
- Location of Senillé-Saint-Sauveur
- Location within France Location within Nouvelle-Aquitaine
- Coordinates: 46°48′29″N 0°37′23″E
- Country: France
- Region: Nouvelle-Aquitaine
- Department: Vienne
- Arrondissement: Châtellerault
- Canton: Châtellerault-3
- Intercommunality: CA Grand Châtellerault

Government
  - Mayor (2020–2026): Gérard Pérochon
- Area^{1}: 50.31 km^{2} (19.42 sq mi)
- Population (2023): 1,706
  - Density: 33.91/km^{2} (87.83/sq mi)
- Time zone: UTC+01:00 (CET)
  - Summer (DST): UTC+02:00 (CEST)
- INSEE/Postal code: 86245 /86100
- ^{1} French Land Register data, which excludes lakes, ponds, glaciers > 1 km^{2} (0.386 sq mi or 247 acres) and river estuaries.

Senillé-Saint-Sauveur (French pronunciation: [sənije sɛ̃ sovœʁ]) is a commune in the Vienne department of western France. The municipality was established on 1 January 2016 and consists of the former communes of Senillé and Saint-Sauveur.

== See also ==
- Communes of the Vienne department
