= Coussay-les-Bois =

- Commune
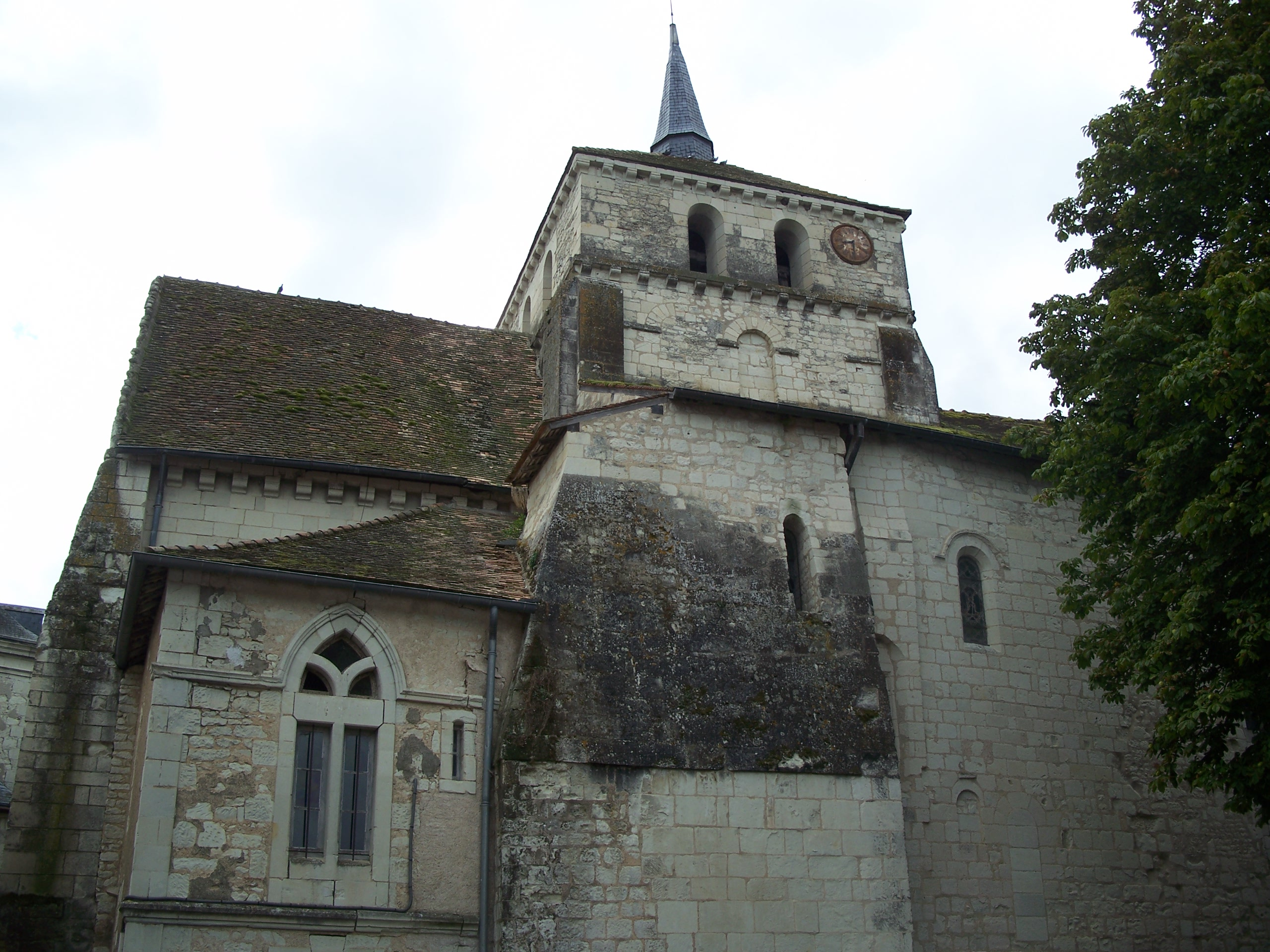
- The church of Our Lady, in Coussay-les-Bois
- Location of Coussay-les-Bois
- Location within France Location within Nouvelle-Aquitaine
- Coordinates: 46°48′31″N 0°44′37″E
- Country: France
- Region: Nouvelle-Aquitaine
- Department: Vienne
- Arrondissement: Châtellerault
- Canton: Châtellerault-3
- Intercommunality: CA Grand Châtellerault

Government
  - Mayor (2023–2026): Elisabeth Michel
- Area^{1}: 43.32 km^{2} (16.73 sq mi)
- Elevation: 77 m (253 ft)
- Highest elevation: 144 m (472 ft)
- Lowest elevation: 62 m (203 ft)
- Population (2023): 919
  - Density: 21.2/km^{2} (54.9/sq mi)
- Time zone: UTC+01:00 (CET)
  - Summer (DST): UTC+02:00 (CEST)
- INSEE/Postal code: 86086 /86270
- ^{1} French Land Register data, which excludes lakes, ponds, glaciers > 1 km^{2} (0.386 sq mi or 247 acres) and river estuaries.

Coussay-les-Bois (French pronunciation: [kusɛ le bwa]) is a commune in the Vienne department in the Nouvelle-Aquitaine region in western France.

== Demographics ==
Historical population
| Year | Pop. | ±% p.a. |
|---|---|---|
| 1968 | 830 | — |
| 1975 | 752 | −1.40% |
| 1982 | 787 | +0.65% |
| 1990 | 779 | −0.13% |
| 1999 | 803 | +0.34% |
| 2007 | 825 | +0.34% |
| 2012 | 922 | +2.25% |
| 2017 | 1,003 | +1.70% |
| 2023 | 919 | −1.45% |
Source: INSEE

== See also ==
- Communes of the Vienne department
