= Vicq-sur-Gartempe =

- Commune
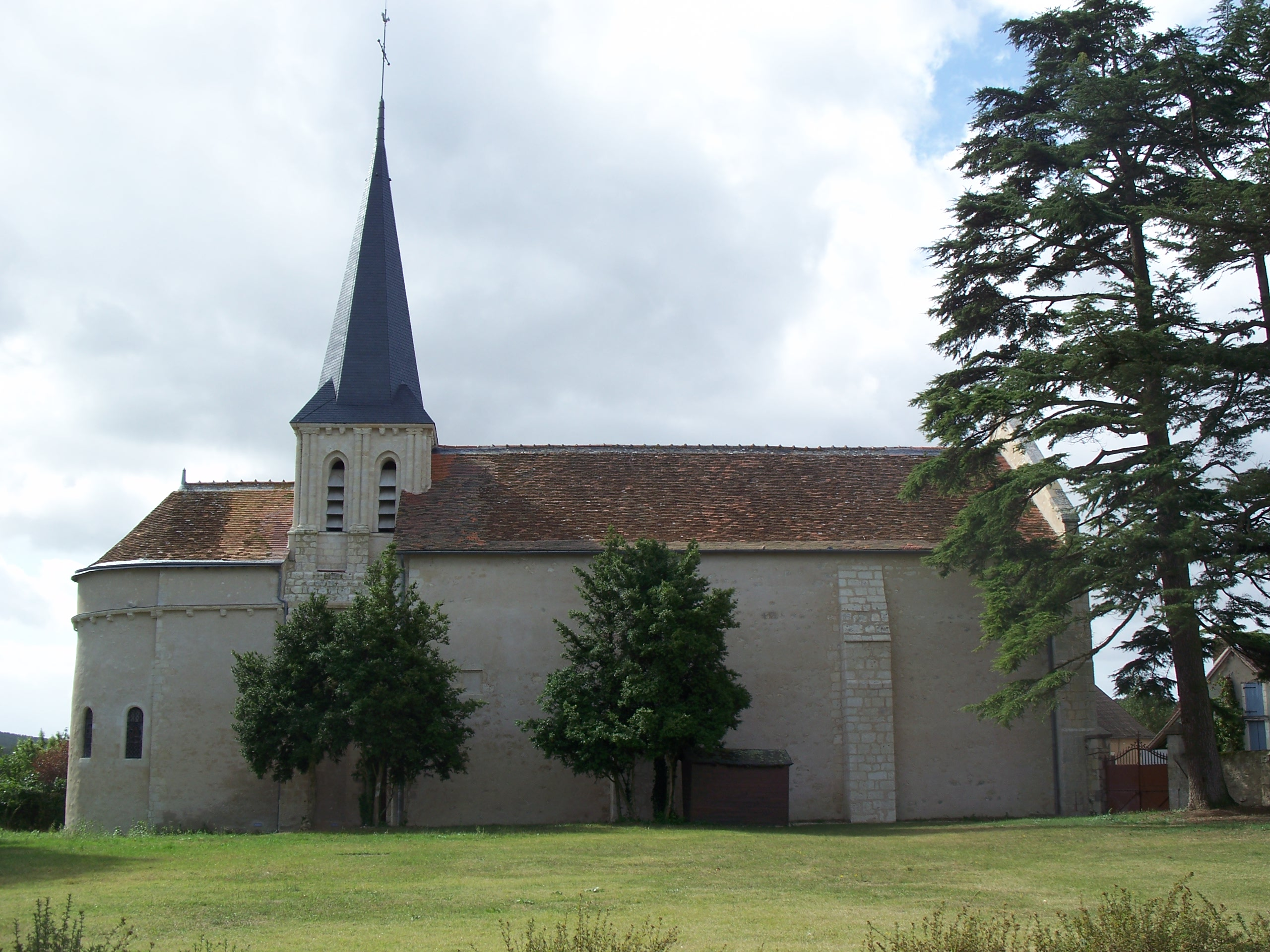
- The church of Saint-Léger, in Vicq-sur-Gartempe

- Coat of arms
- Location of Vicq-sur-Gartempe
- Location within France Location within Nouvelle-Aquitaine
- Coordinates: 46°43′19″N 0°51′45″E
- Country: France
- Region: Nouvelle-Aquitaine
- Department: Vienne
- Arrondissement: Châtellerault
- Canton: Châtellerault-3
- Intercommunality: CA Grand Châtellerault

Government
  - Mayor (2020–2026): Pascal Bernard
- Area^{1}: 33.22 km^{2} (12.83 sq mi)
- Elevation: 80 m (260 ft)
- Highest elevation: 142 m (466 ft)
- Lowest elevation: 57 m (187 ft)
- Population (2023): 658
  - Density: 19.8/km^{2} (51.3/sq mi)
- Time zone: UTC+01:00 (CET)
  - Summer (DST): UTC+02:00 (CEST)
- INSEE/Postal code: 86288 /86260
- ^{1} French Land Register data, which excludes lakes, ponds, glaciers > 1 km^{2} (0.386 sq mi or 247 acres) and river estuaries.

Vicq-sur-Gartempe (French pronunciation: [vik syʁ ɡaʁtɑ̃p], literally Vicq on Gartempe) is a commune in the Vienne department in the Nouvelle-Aquitaine region in western France.

== Demographics ==
Historical population
| Year | Pop. | ±% p.a. |
|---|---|---|
| 1968 | 1,014 | — |
| 1975 | 893 | −1.80% |
| 1982 | 756 | −2.35% |
| 1990 | 668 | −1.54% |
| 1999 | 715 | +0.76% |
| 2007 | 716 | +0.02% |
| 2012 | 680 | −1.03% |
| 2017 | 615 | −1.99% |
| 2023 | 658 | +1.13% |
Source: INSEE

== See also ==
- Communes of the Vienne department
