= Arrondissements of the Vienne department =

Administrative divisions of Vienne, France

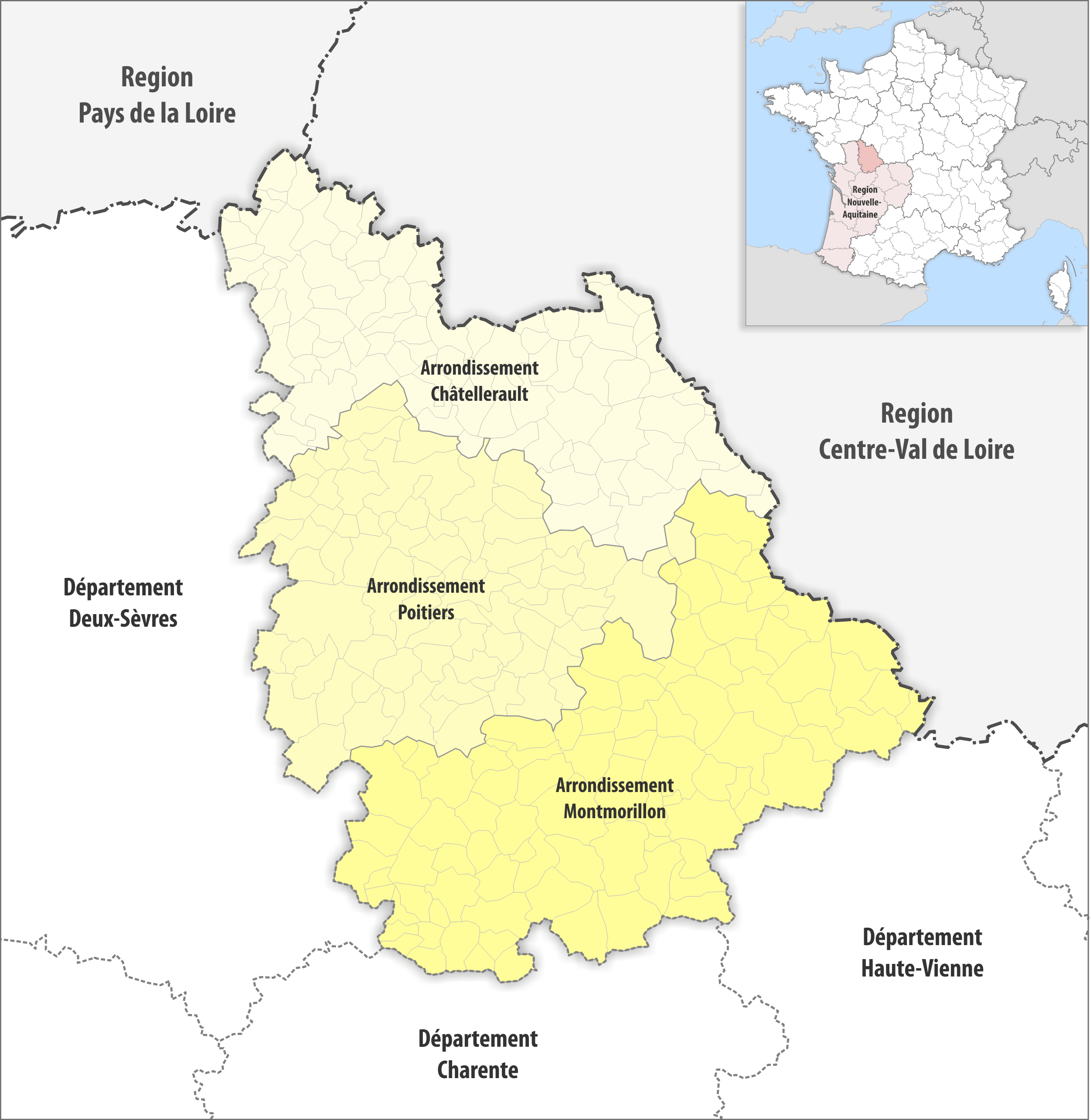
Map of arrondissements of the Vienne department.

The 3 arrondissements of the Vienne department are:

1. Arrondissement of Châtellerault, (subprefecture: Châtellerault) with 92 communes. The population of the arrondissement was 107,469 in 2021.
2. Arrondissement of Montmorillon, (subprefecture: Montmorillon) with 91 communes. The population of the arrondissement was 65,756 in 2021.
3. Arrondissement of Poitiers, (prefecture of the Vienne department: Poitiers) with 83 communes. The population of the arrondissement was 266,160 in 2021.

== History ==
In 1800, the arrondissements of Poitiers, Châtellerault, Civray, Loudun and Montmorillon were established. The arrondissement of Civray and Loudun were disbanded in 1926.

The borders of the arrondissements of Vienne were modified in January 2017:

- four communes from the arrondissement of Châtellerault to the arrondissement of Poitiers
- one commune from the arrondissement of Montmorillon to the arrondissement of Châtellerault
- two communes from the arrondissement of Montmorillon to the arrondissement of Poitiers
