= Pleumartin =

- Commune
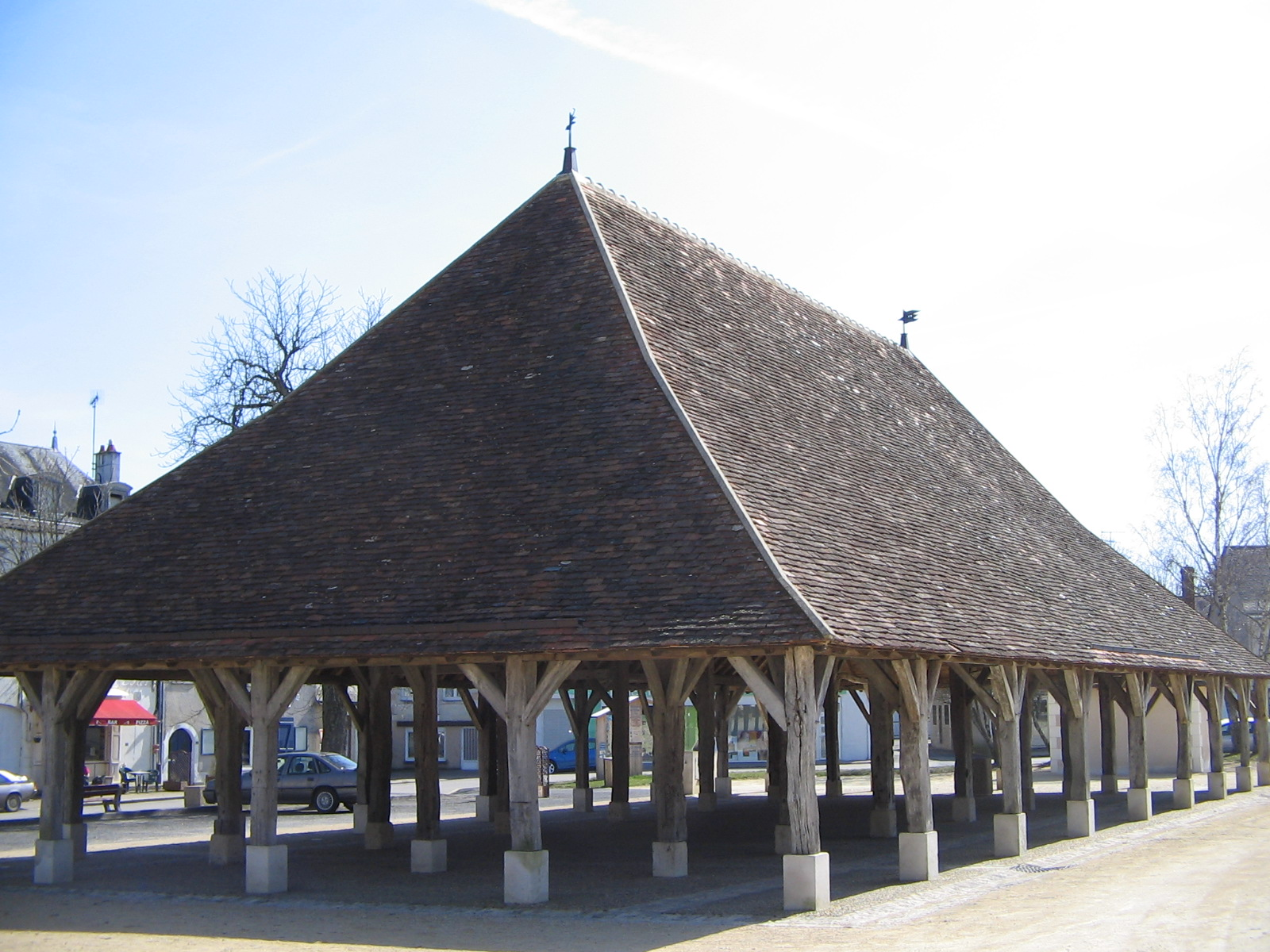
- The covered marketplace, in Pleumartin

- Coat of arms
- Location of Pleumartin
- Location within France Location within Nouvelle-Aquitaine
- Coordinates: 46°44′18″N 0°46′09″E
- Country: France
- Region: Nouvelle-Aquitaine
- Department: Vienne
- Arrondissement: Châtellerault
- Canton: Châtellerault-3
- Intercommunality: CA Grand Châtellerault

Government
  - Mayor (2020–2026): Éric Bailly
- Area^{1}: 23.92 km^{2} (9.24 sq mi)
- Elevation: 138 m (453 ft)
- Highest elevation: 144 m (472 ft)
- Lowest elevation: 85 m (279 ft)
- Population (2023): 1,214
  - Density: 50.75/km^{2} (131.4/sq mi)
- Time zone: UTC+01:00 (CET)
  - Summer (DST): UTC+02:00 (CEST)
- INSEE/Postal code: 86193 /86450
- ^{1} French Land Register data, which excludes lakes, ponds, glaciers > 1 km^{2} (0.386 sq mi or 247 acres) and river estuaries.

Pleumartin (French pronunciation: [plømaʁtɛ̃]) is a commune in the Vienne department in the Nouvelle-Aquitaine region in western France.

== Demographics ==
Historical population
Year	Pop.	±% p.a.
1968	1,302	—
1975	1,173	−1.48%
1982	1,178	+0.06%
1990	1,154	−0.26%
1999	1,117	−0.36%
2007	1,164	+0.52%
2012	1,212	+0.81%
2017	1,246	+0.55%
2023	1,214	−0.43%
Source: INSEE

== See also ==
- Communes of the Vienne department
