= Mairé-Levescault =

- Commune
- Location of Mairé-Levescault
- Location within France Location within Nouvelle-Aquitaine
- Coordinates: 46°09′18″N 0°04′57″E
- Country: France
- Region: Nouvelle-Aquitaine
- Department: Deux-Sèvres
- Arrondissement: Niort
- Canton: Melle

Government
  - Mayor (2020–2026): Dorick Barillot
- Area^{1}: 17.38 km^{2} (6.71 sq mi)
- Elevation: 145 m (476 ft)
- Highest elevation: 159 m (522 ft)
- Lowest elevation: 130 m (430 ft)
- Population (2023): 582
  - Density: 33.5/km^{2} (86.7/sq mi)
- Time zone: UTC+01:00 (CET)
  - Summer (DST): UTC+02:00 (CEST)
- INSEE/Postal code: 79163 /79190
- ^{1} French Land Register data, which excludes lakes, ponds, glaciers > 1 km^{2} (0.386 sq mi or 247 acres) and river estuaries.

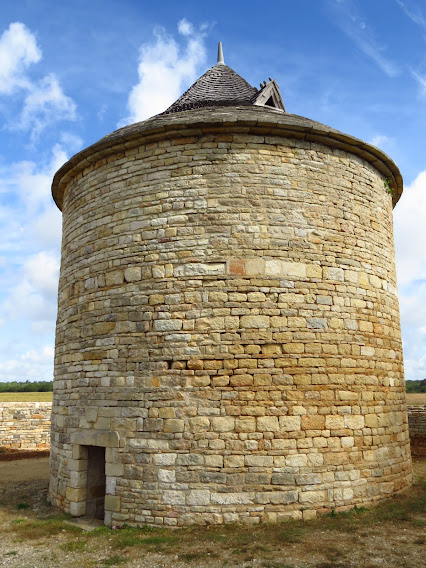
Mairé-Levescaultt

Mairé-Levescaultt is a commune in the Deux-Sèvres department in western France. (Not to be confused with Mairé, in the same general area).

== History ==
The history and derivation of the name of Mairé-L'Evescault are closely linked to that of Saint Junian (Junien), the patron saint of Poitou ploughmen. He was born in the year AD 500 or AD 501 in the area of "Briosso" (now called Briançais) on an estate named "Champagné" which still exists close to the village of Mairé in the commune of Perigné, Deux-Sèvres, and was educated by his parents who were Gallo-Roman nobility.

Although his name is undoubtedly of Pagan origin, coming from the Roman gods Juno/Jupiter, he was dedicated to the service of God from his earliest childhood and was instructed in all the sacred and human sciences which were taught at that time.

Nothing else is known about his early life but we re-encounter Junien as a young man living as a hermit in a place called Bois Trappeau in the commune of Ardilleux in Deux-Sèvres.

In 559, King Clotaire I made him a gift of land on which to found a monastery dedicated to the rule of Saint Benoît. This isolated place evoked memories of his childhood home and Junien named it "Mariacus" - subsequently "Mairé". The "L'Evescault" was added after a great religious festival in Poitiers to which Junien was invited by Queen Radagonde who raised him to the same rank as the other bishops or "Les Evêques" who were present. Hence the name Mairé-L'Evescault.

The monastery was partially destroyed during the wars of Pepin the Short and Charlemagne but survived for another thousand years. It was finally demolished during the French Revolution, the stone being re-used for local construction and the lands reverting to their farming origins.

== The commune today ==
The commune is now a sprawl of scattered villages with a population of approximately 560.

== See also ==
- Communes of the Deux-Sèvres department
