= La Roche-Posay =

- Commune
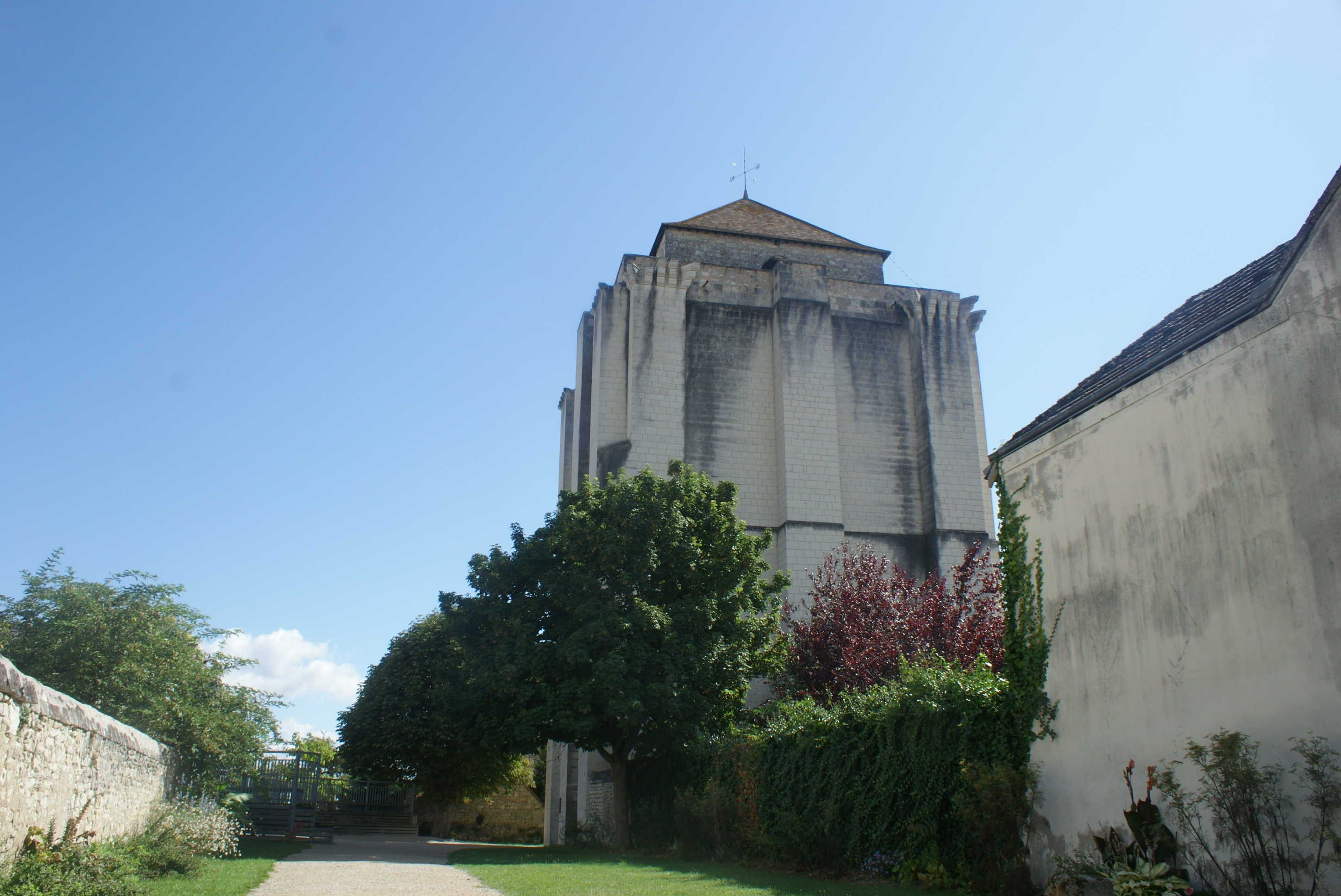
- The keep of La Roche-Posay

- Coat of arms
- Location of La Roche-Posay
- Location within France Location within Nouvelle-Aquitaine
- Coordinates: 46°47′14″N 0°48′48″E
- Country: France
- Region: Nouvelle-Aquitaine
- Department: Vienne
- Arrondissement: Châtellerault
- Canton: Châtellerault-3
- Intercommunality: CA Grand Châtellerault

Government
  - Mayor (2020–2026): Yannick Tartarin
- Area^{1}: 35.31 km^{2} (13.63 sq mi)
- Elevation: 73 m (240 ft)
- Highest elevation: 139 m (456 ft)
- Lowest elevation: 52 m (171 ft)
- Population (2023): 1,566
  - Density: 44.35/km^{2} (114.9/sq mi)
- Time zone: UTC+01:00 (CET)
  - Summer (DST): UTC+02:00 (CEST)
- INSEE/Postal code: 86207 /86270
- ^{1} French Land Register data, which excludes lakes, ponds, glaciers > 1 km^{2} (0.386 sq mi or 247 acres) and river estuaries.

La Roche-Posay (French pronunciation: [la ʁɔʃ pozɛ]) is a commune in the Vienne department in the Nouvelle-Aquitaine region in western France.

== See also ==
- Communes of the Vienne department
