= Leigné-les-Bois =

- Commune
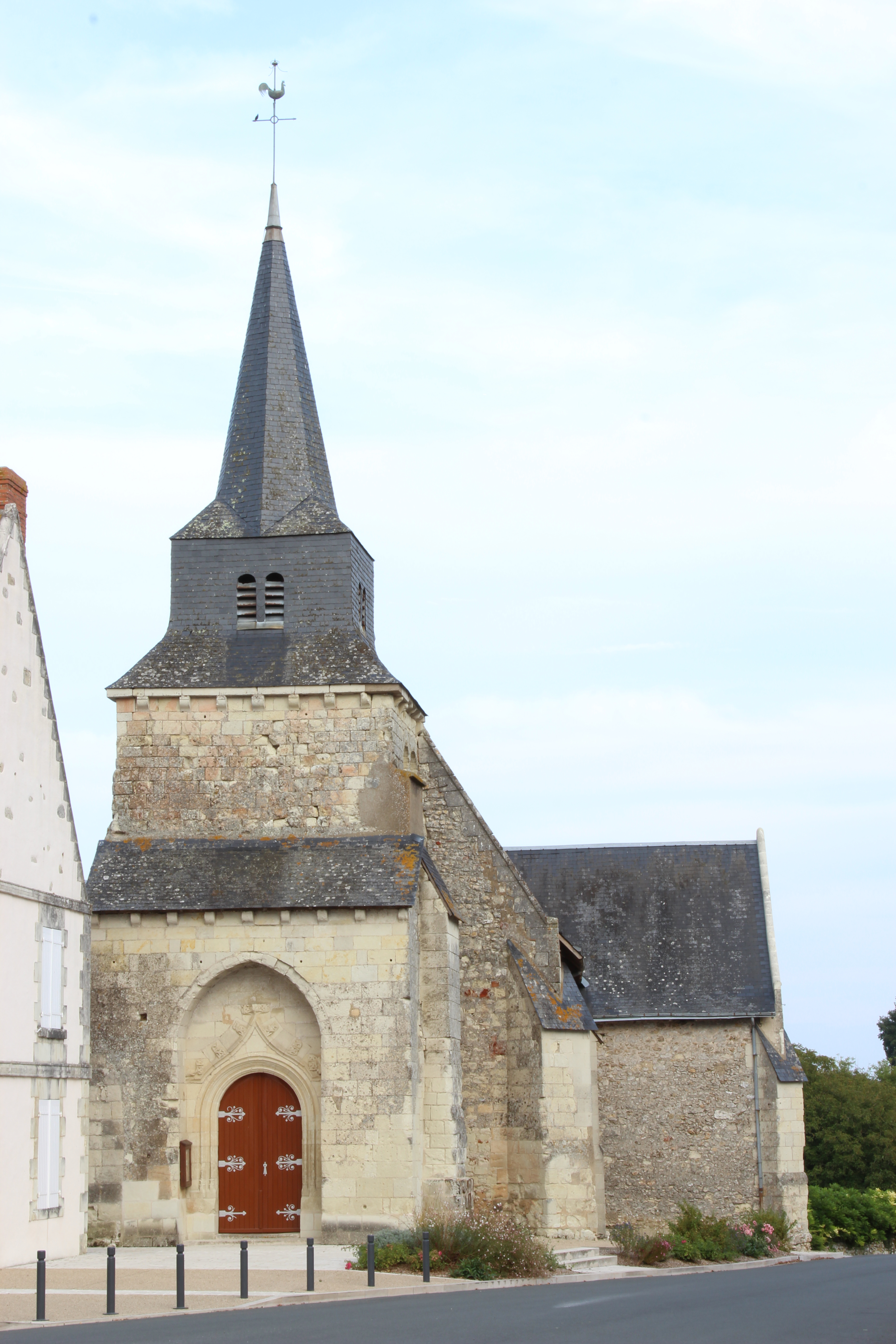
- The parish church of Saint-Rémi, in Leigné-les-Bois
- Location of Leigné-les-Bois
- Location within France Location within Nouvelle-Aquitaine
- Coordinates: 46°45′37″N 0°42′26″E
- Country: France
- Region: Nouvelle-Aquitaine
- Department: Vienne
- Arrondissement: Châtellerault
- Canton: Châtellerault-3
- Intercommunality: CA Grand Châtellerault

Government
  - Mayor (2020–2026): Philippe Guenaire
- Area^{1}: 29.97 km^{2} (11.57 sq mi)
- Elevation: 139 m (456 ft)
- Highest elevation: 142 m (466 ft)
- Lowest elevation: 83 m (272 ft)
- Population (2023): 547
  - Density: 18.3/km^{2} (47.3/sq mi)
- Time zone: UTC+01:00 (CET)
  - Summer (DST): UTC+02:00 (CEST)
- INSEE/Postal code: 86125 /86450
- ^{1} French Land Register data, which excludes lakes, ponds, glaciers > 1 km^{2} (0.386 sq mi or 247 acres) and river estuaries.

Leigné-les-Bois (French pronunciation: [lɛɲe le bwa]) is a commune in the Vienne department in the Nouvelle-Aquitaine region in western France.

== Demographics ==
Historical population
Year	Pop.	±% p.a.
1968	578	—
1975	519	−1.53%
1982	509	−0.28%
1990	500	−0.22%
1999	465	−0.80%
2007	570	+2.58%
2012	579	+0.31%
2017	592	+0.45%
2023	547	−1.31%
Source: INSEE

== See also ==
- Communes of the Vienne department
