= Chenevelles =

- Commune
- Location of Chenevelles
- Location within France Location within Nouvelle-Aquitaine
- Coordinates: 46°43′43″N 0°39′16″E
- Country: France
- Region: Nouvelle-Aquitaine
- Department: Vienne
- Arrondissement: Châtellerault
- Canton: Châtellerault-3
- Intercommunality: CA Grand Châtellerault

Government
  - Mayor (2020–2026): Cyril Cibert
- Area^{1}: 29.3 km^{2} (11.3 sq mi)
- Elevation: 130 m (430 ft)
- Highest elevation: 143 m (469 ft)
- Lowest elevation: 72 m (236 ft)
- Population (2023): 435
  - Density: 14.8/km^{2} (38.5/sq mi)
- Time zone: UTC+01:00 (CET)
  - Summer (DST): UTC+02:00 (CEST)
- INSEE/Postal code: 86072 /86450
- ^{1} French Land Register data, which excludes lakes, ponds, glaciers > 1 km^{2} (0.386 sq mi or 247 acres) and river estuaries.

Chenevelles (French pronunciation: [ʃənvɛl]) is a commune in the Vienne department in the Nouvelle-Aquitaine region in western France.

== Demographics ==
Historical population
Year	Pop.	±% p.a.
1968	498	—
1975	417	−2.50%
1982	394	−0.81%
1990	393	−0.03%
1999	406	+0.36%
2007	438	+0.95%
2012	486	+2.10%
2017	469	−0.71%
2023	435	−1.25%
Source: INSEE

== See also ==
- Communes of the Vienne department
