= Benoît-François Bernier =

Benoît-François Bernier (24 April 1720, Vienne (Note: Sources;) – 1799 (Note: Sources;)), also known as Joseph-Pierre (Note: Sources;) was a French army officer, Commissioner of War (Note: Sources;) who served in New France. He gained notability as the financial commissary of wars in that location. He was born to parents François Bernier and Marie Malen (Sometimes written "Mallen"). He married a woman by the name of Vincente Elisabeth Verger, though the date of this is as of yet unknown.

The earliest records of Bernier's military service see him as a "Sub-Lieutenant" in the Royal Swedish Regiment in 1747, following this it is known that he served in the Siege of Maastricht in 1748 as a Lieutenant proper, with half pay, for reasons that are currently unknown, before he joined in with Dieskau's campaigning in the French and Indian War, as his aide-de-camp (Note: Sources;).

Bernier is known to have been a recipient of the Order of Saint Louis (Note: Sources;) in late November of 1760, following his moving to the French mainland, he was also issued a pension of 1,200 Livres, and in addition, he was made a financial commissary in Dunkirk (Note: He is also listed as an "Ordinator" for the Navy at Dunkirk, these are indicative of the same rank.), where he is known to have lived for the remainder of his life. He retired on September 2, 1776. A survivor of the French Revolution, the new Republican government also issued him an annual pension. Benoît-François Bernier died in 1799.
