= Mairé =

- Commune
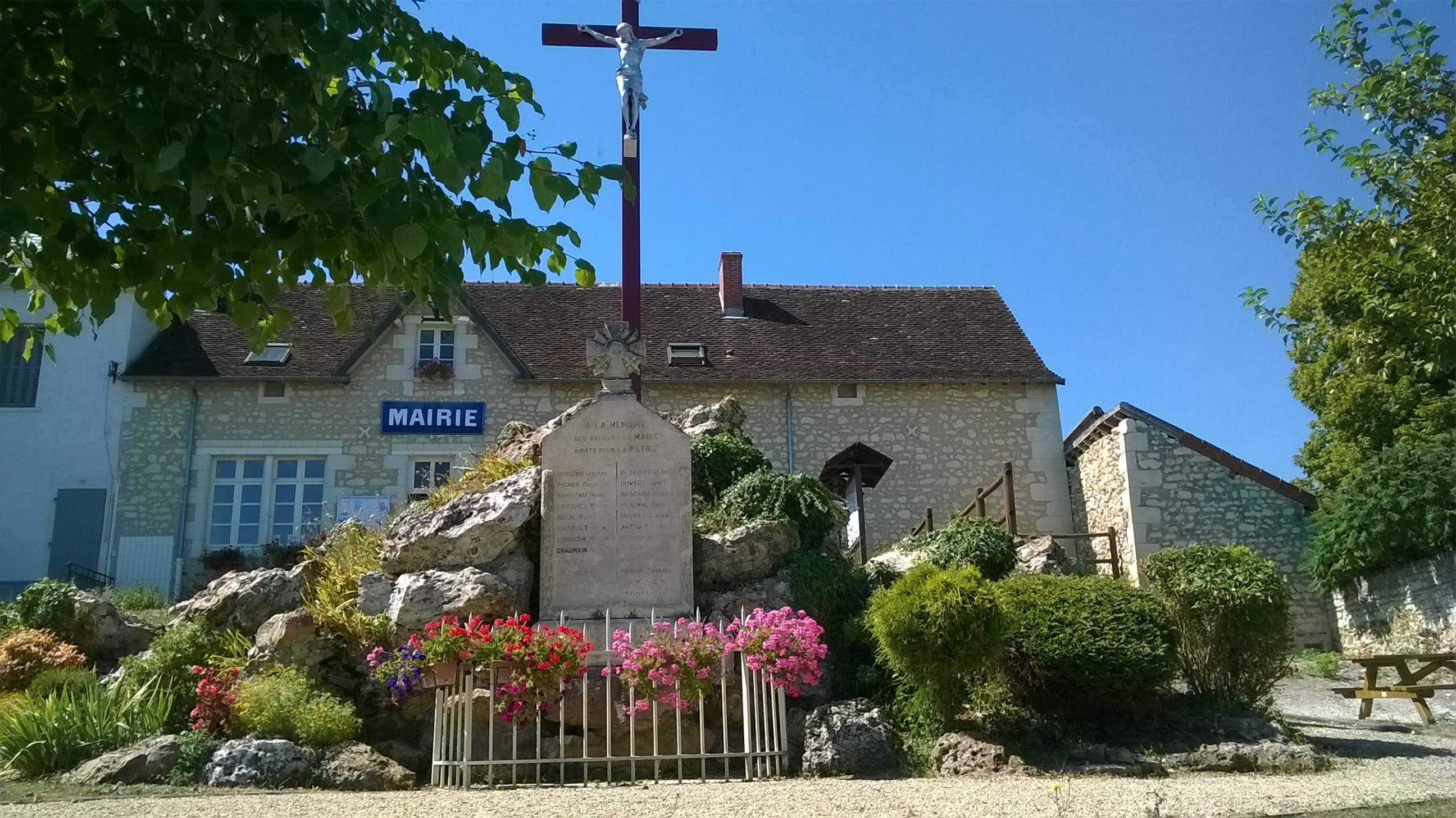
- Town hall of Mairé
- Location of Mairé
- Location within France Location within Nouvelle-Aquitaine
- Coordinates: 46°51′34″N 0°45′03″E
- Country: France
- Region: Nouvelle-Aquitaine
- Department: Vienne
- Arrondissement: Châtellerault
- Canton: Châtellerault-3
- Intercommunality: CA Grand Châtellerault

Government
  - Mayor (2020–2026): Thierry Triphose
- Area^{1}: 20.57 km^{2} (7.94 sq mi)
- Elevation: 60 m (200 ft)
- Highest elevation: 144 m (472 ft)
- Lowest elevation: 46 m (151 ft)
- Population (2023): 173
  - Density: 8.41/km^{2} (21.8/sq mi)
- Time zone: UTC+01:00 (CET)
  - Summer (DST): UTC+02:00 (CEST)
- INSEE/Postal code: 86143 /86270
- ^{1} French Land Register data, which excludes lakes, ponds, glaciers > 1 km^{2} (0.386 sq mi or 247 acres) and river estuaries.

Mairé (French pronunciation: [mɛʁe]) is a commune in the Vienne department in the Nouvelle-Aquitaine region in western France. (Not to be confused with Mairé-Levescault, in the same general area).

== Demographics ==
Historical population
Year	Pop.	±% p.a.
1968	212	—
1975	199	−0.90%
1982	193	−0.44%
1990	174	−1.29%
1999	167	−0.46%
2007	201	+2.34%
2012	164	−3.99%
2017	158	−0.74%
2023	173	+1.52%
Source: INSEE

== See also ==
- Communes of the Vienne department
