= Cantons of the Vienne department =

The following is a list of the 19 cantons of the Vienne department, in France, following the French canton reorganisation which came into effect in March 2015:

- Chasseneuil-du-Poitou
- Châtellerault-1
- Châtellerault-2
- Châtellerault-3
- Chauvigny
- Civray
- Jaunay-Marigny
- Loudun
- Lusignan
- Lussac-les-Châteaux
- Migné-Auxances
- Montmorillon
- Poitiers-1
- Poitiers-2
- Poitiers-3
- Poitiers-4
- Poitiers-5
- Vivonne
- Vouneuil-sous-Biard
