= Lésigny, Vienne =

Lésigny
- Commune
- Location of Lésigny
- Location within France Location within Nouvelle-Aquitaine
- Coordinates: 46°50′58″N 0°46′06″E
- Country: France
- Region: Nouvelle-Aquitaine
- Department: Vienne
- Arrondissement: Châtellerault
- Canton: Châtellerault-3
- Intercommunality: CA Grand Châtellerault

Government
  - Mayor (2020–2026): Frédéric Pierron
- Area^{1}: 13.21 km^{2} (5.10 sq mi)
- Elevation: 5,013 m (16,447 ft)
- Highest elevation: 138 m (453 ft)
- Lowest elevation: 47 m (154 ft)
- Population (2023): 524
  - Density: 39.7/km^{2} (103/sq mi)
- Time zone: UTC+01:00 (CET)
  - Summer (DST): UTC+02:00 (CEST)
- INSEE/Postal code: 86129 /86270
- ^{1} French Land Register data, which excludes lakes, ponds, glaciers > 1 km^{2} (0.386 sq mi or 247 acres) and river estuaries.

Lésigny (French pronunciation: [leziɲi]) is a commune in the Vienne department in the Nouvelle-Aquitaine region in western France.

== Demographics ==
Historical population
Year	Pop.	±% p.a.
1968	531	—
1975	431	−2.94%
1982	471	+1.28%
1990	516	+1.15%
1999	520	+0.09%
2007	539	+0.45%
2012	533	−0.22%
2017	537	+0.15%
2023	524	−0.41%
Source: INSEE

== See also ==
- Communes of the Vienne department
