= Vienne (department) =

Department of west-central France

- Department
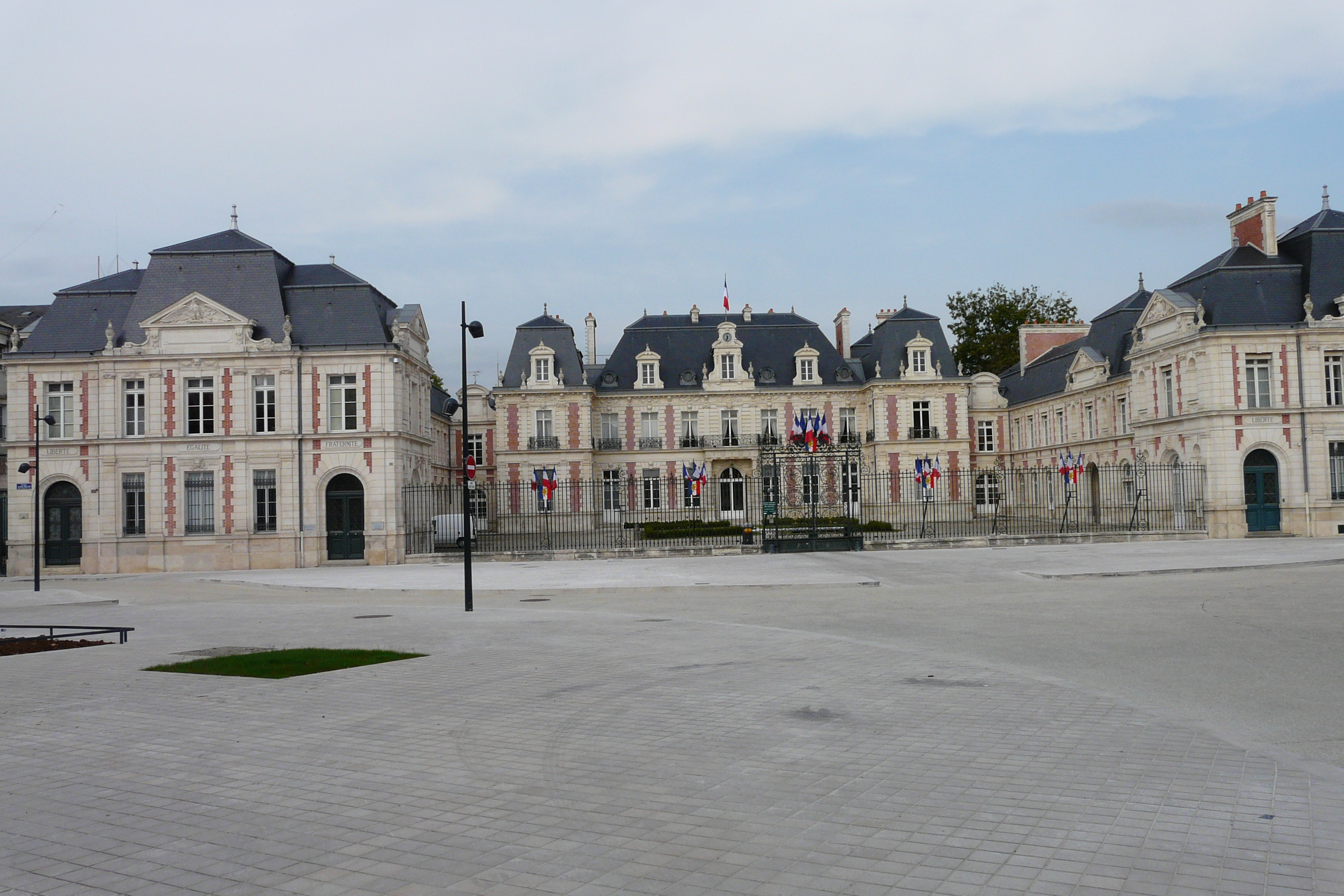
- Prefecture building of the Vienne department, in Poitiers

- Flag Coat of arms

- Location of Vienne in France
- Coordinates: 45.5221°N 4.8453°E
- Country: France
- Region: Nouvelle-Aquitaine
- Prefecture: Poitiers
- Subprefectures: Châtellerault; Montmorillon

Government
  - President of the Departmental Council: Alain Pichon

Area^{1}
  - Total: 6,990 km^{2} (2,700 sq mi)

Population (2023)
  - Total: 438,897
  - Rank: 56th
  - Density: 62.8/km^{2} (163/sq mi)
- Time zone: UTC+1 (CET)
  - Summer (DST): UTC+2 (CEST)
- ISO 3166 code: FR-86
- Department number: 86
- Arrondissements: 3
- Cantons: 19
- Communes: 265
- ^1 French Land Register data, which exclude estuaries, and lakes, ponds, and glaciers larger than 1 km^{2}

Vienne (French pronunciation: [vjɛn] vyen; Poitevin-Saintongeais: Viéne) is a landlocked department in the French region of Nouvelle-Aquitaine. It takes its name from the river Vienne. It had a population of 438,897 in 2023.

== History ==
Established on 4 March 1790, during the French Revolution, Vienne is one of the original 83 departments of France. It was created from parts of the former provinces of Poitou, Touraine, and Berry, the last being a part of the Duchy of Aquitaine until the 15th century.

The original Acadians, who settled in and around what is now Nova Scotia, left Vienne for North America after 1604. Gregory Kennedy argues that the emigrants carried to Canada their customs and social structure. They were frontier peoples, who dispersed their settlements based on kinship. They optimized use of farmland and emphasized trading for a profit. They were hierarchical and politically active.

== Geography ==
The department of Vienne has an area of 6,990 km^{2} (2,700 sq mi). Part of the region of Nouvelle-Aquitaine, it borders Maine-et-Loire to the northwest, Indre-et-Loire to the north, Indre to the east, Haute-Vienne to the southeast, Charente to the south and Deux-Sèvres to the west. It is crossed by the river Vienne, a tributary of the Loire.

=== Principal towns ===
The most populous commune is Poitiers, the prefecture. As of 2023, there are 6 communes with more than 7,000 inhabitants:

Commune	Population (2023)
Poitiers	89,916
Châtellerault	31,003
Buxerolles	10,289
Jaunay-Marigny	7,528
Saint-Benoît	7,375
Chauvigny	7,007

== Demographics ==
Population development since 1801:

Historical population

Year	Pop.	±% p.a.
1801	240,990	—
1806	252,351	+0.93%
1821	260,697	+0.22%
1831	282,731	+0.81%
1841	294,250	+0.40%
1851	317,305	+0.76%
1861	322,028	+0.15%
1872	320,598	−0.04%
1881	340,295	+0.66%
1891	344,355	+0.12%
1901	336,343	−0.24%
1911	332,276	−0.12%
1921	306,248	−0.81%
1931	303,072	−0.10%

Year	Pop.	±% p.a.
1936	306,820	+0.25%
1946	313,932	+0.23%
1954	319,208	+0.21%
1962	331,619	+0.48%
1968	340,256	+0.43%
1975	357,366	+0.70%
1982	371,428	+0.55%
1990	380,005	+0.29%
1999	399,024	+0.54%
2007	421,891	+0.70%
2012	430,018	+0.38%
2017	436,876	+0.32%
2023	438,897	+0.08%

== Politics ==
Édith Cresson, France's first woman prime minister from 1991 to 1992, was a deputy (MP) for the department. The president of the Departmental Council is Alain Pichon, elected for an additional term in 2021.

Vienne has three arrondissements: Poitiers, the prefecture, and the subprefectures Châtellerault and Montmorillon.

=== Current National Assembly Representatives ===
Constituency	Member	Party
Vienne's 1st constituency	Lisa Belluco	The Ecologists
Vienne's 2nd constituency	Sacha Houlié	Renaissance
Vienne's 3rd constituency	Pascal Lecamp	MoDem
Vienne's 4th constituency	Nicolas Turquois	MoDem

== Religion ==
The capital, Poitiers, is the see of the Roman Catholic Archdiocese of Poitiers, which pastorally serves the department. Ligugé Abbey, a Benedictine monastery a few kilometers to the south of Poitiers, is the oldest continuously active monastery in Western Europe.

== Tourism and sights ==
The most famous tourist sites include the Futuroscope theme park, Poitiers (city of Art and History), the Abbey Church of Saint-Savin-sur-Gartempe, a UNESCO world heritage site, the animal parks of Monkey's Valley in Romagne and the Crocodile Planet in Civaux.

== Economy ==
The production of goat cheese is an important industry in Vienne.

== International relations ==
Vienne has a partnership relationship with:

Esslingen am Neckar, Germany; Berkshire, England; (Finland) Oulu; Piotrków Trybunalski, Poland	Shenzhen, China, since 1993; Udine, Italy; Velenje, Slovenia; Wrocław, Poland

== Notable people ==
- Benoît-François Bernier (1720–1799), New France army officer, served as financial commissary of wars.

== Gallery ==
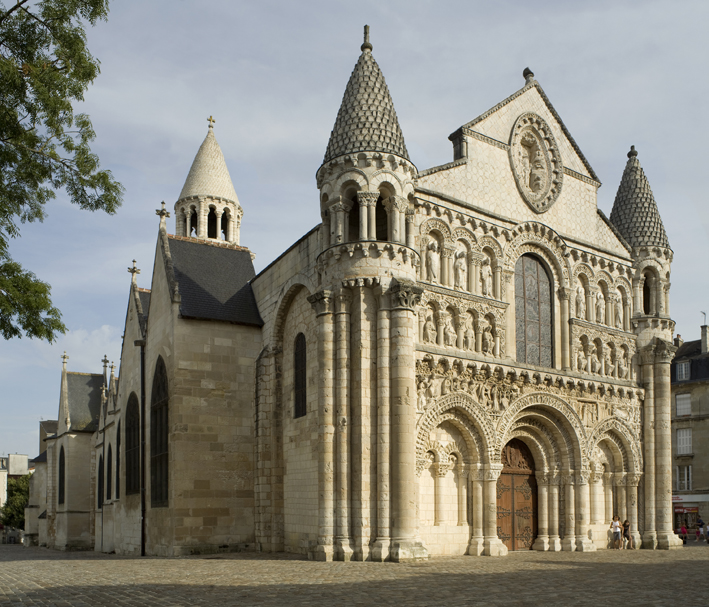
Notre-Dame of Poitiers

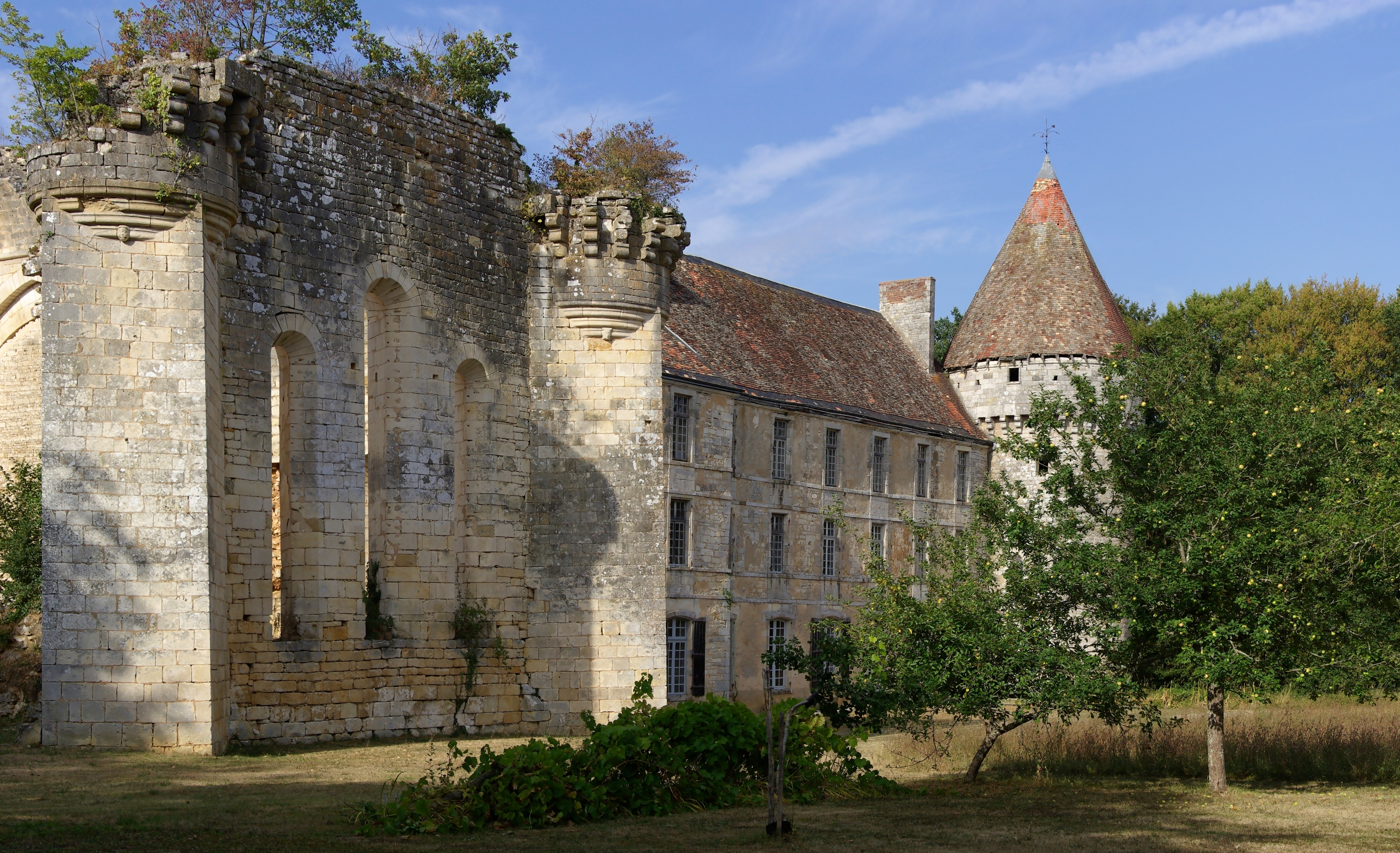
Saint-Martin-l'Ars

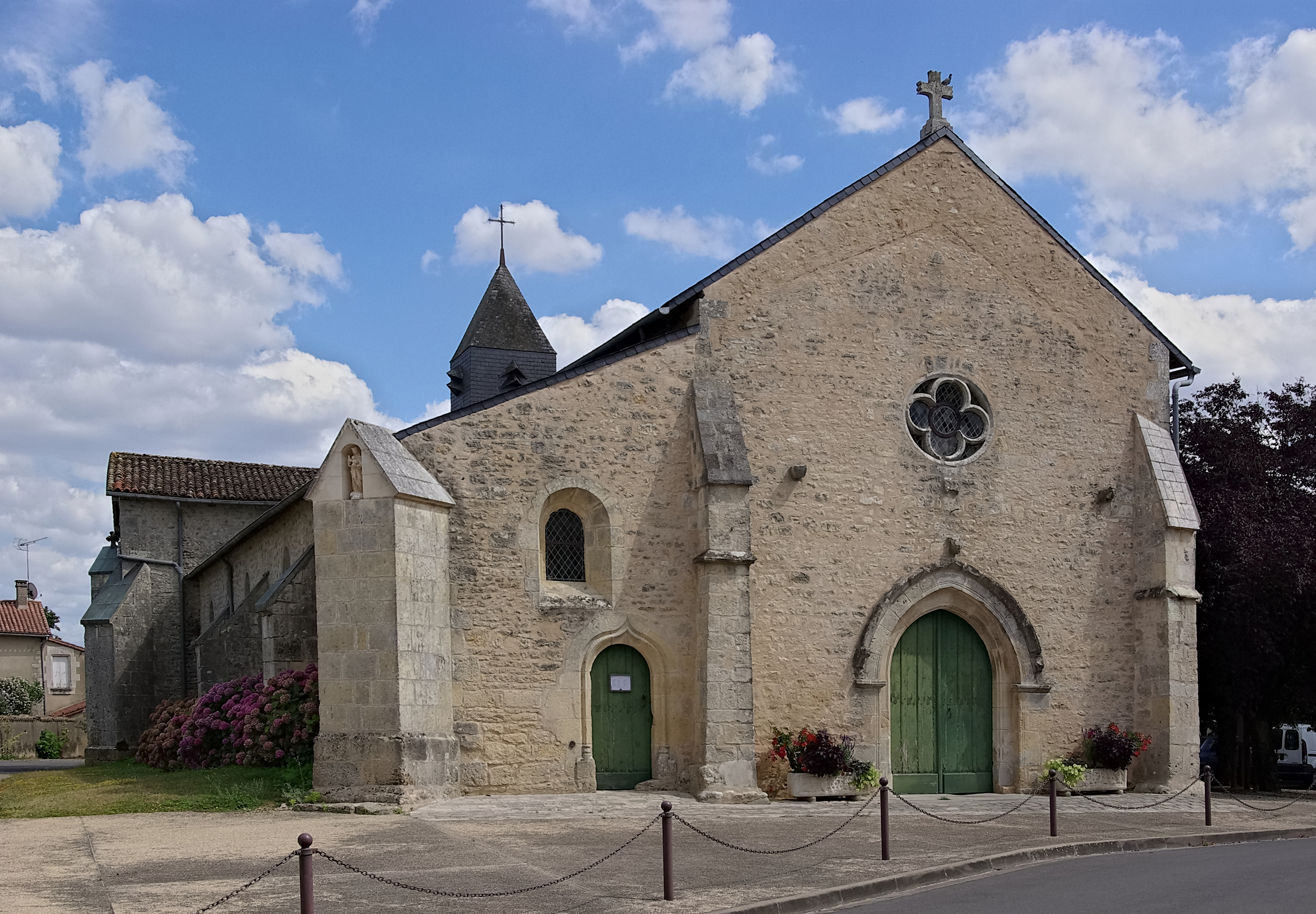
Romagne

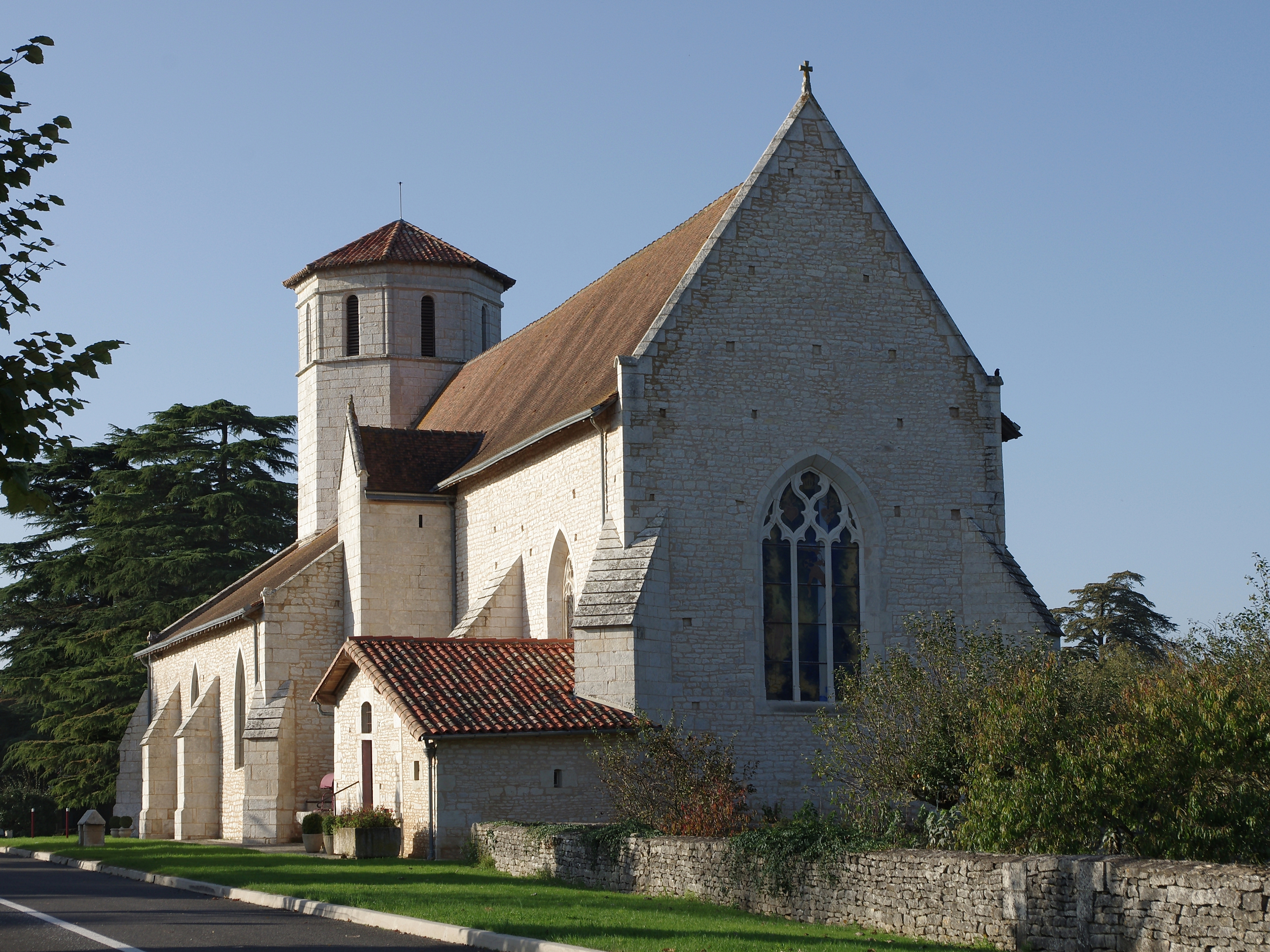
Blanzay

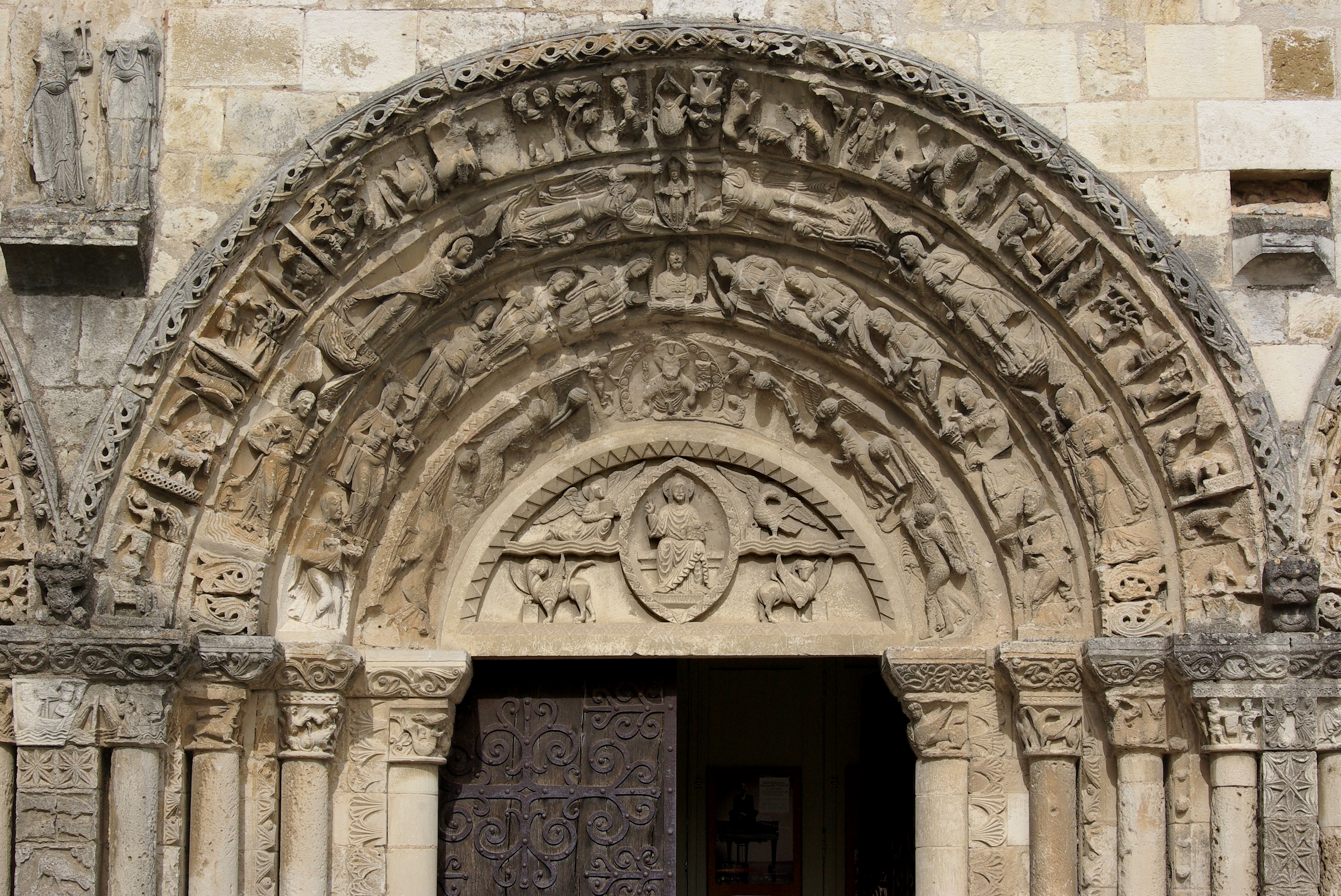
Tympanum of the church of Civray

== See also ==
- Communes of the Vienne department
- Cantons of the Vienne department
- Arrondissements of the Vienne department
- Anjou wine
