= Louis de Saint-Gelais =

16th Century French royal bastard and diplomat

- seigneur de Lanssac baron de La Mothe-Saint-Héray
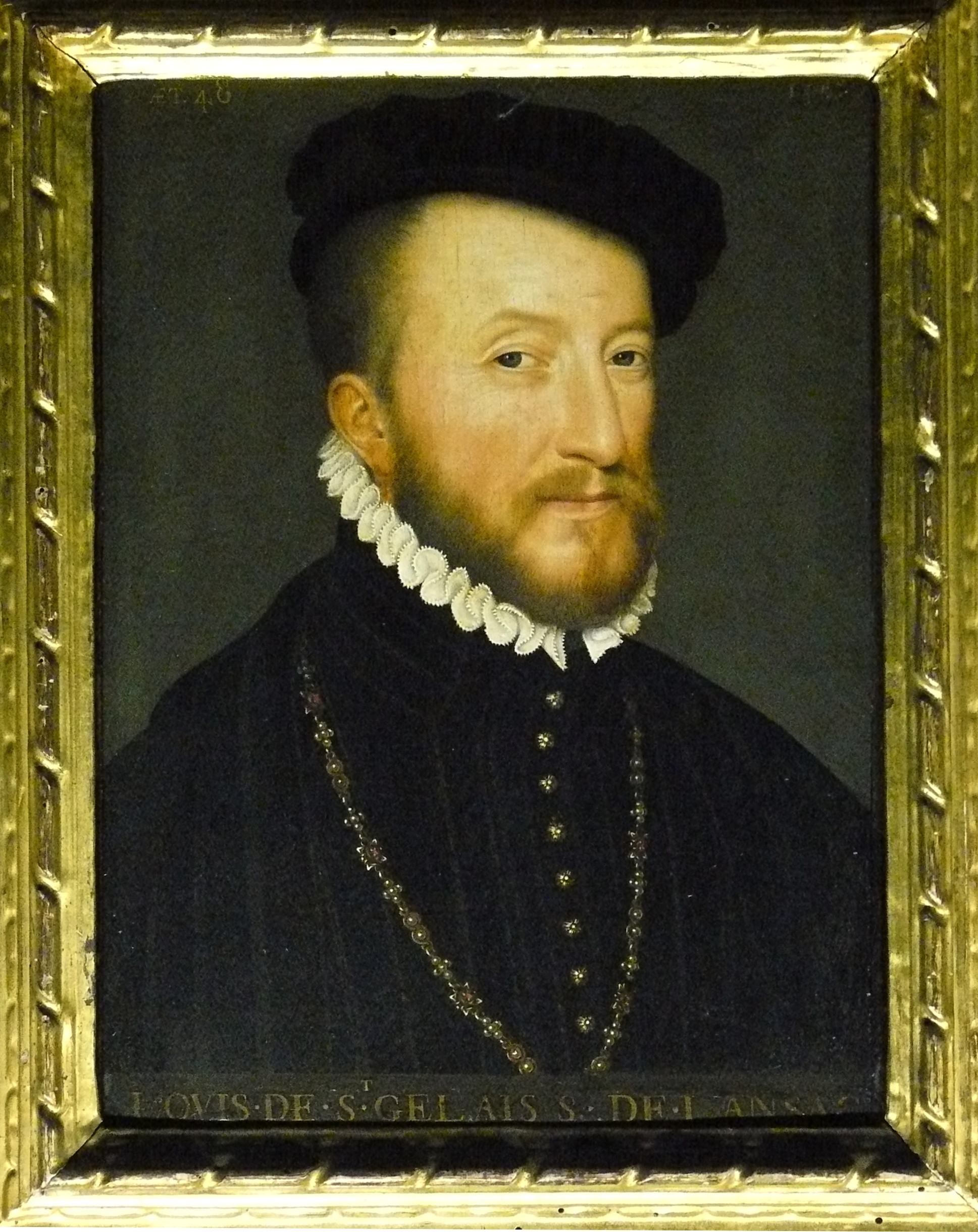
- Louis de Saint-Gelais, seigneur de Lanssac
- Born: 1512/1513
- Died: 1593; Précy-sur-Oise
- Noble family: Saint-Gelais
- Spouses: Jeanne de La Roche-Andry (1543–1563); Gabrielle de Rochechouart (1565–1593)
- Issue Detail: Urbain; Guy; Claude; Charles; François
- Father: Francis I
- Mother: Jacquette de Lanssac

Louis de Saint-Gelais, seigneur de Lanssac and baron de La Mothe-Saint-Héray (1512/1513 – 1593) was a French noble, soldier, governor, and diplomat during the latter Italian Wars and the French Wars of Religion. Probably the bastard son of the French king Francis I and Jacquette de Lanssac, Louis (henceforth referred to by his title Lanssac) split his time between Guyenne and the French court. In 1536 he was established as the capitaine de Bourg (captain of Bourg) in Guyenne. He undertook military service against the Holy Roman Emperor in the Italian Wars. By the time of the reign of Francis' son Henry II which began in 1547, Lanssac's particular aptitude for diplomacy saw him transfer to a primarily diplomatic career. He was sent as an extraordinary ambassador for the negotiations that ended the war of the Rough Wooing in 1550. He was then employed for several missions in the Holy Roman Emperor as Henry looked to resume the Italian Wars in 1552, though these were largely unsuccessful. That year he undertook his first diplomatic service to the Papal States for the ratification of a truce between France and the Papacy. On his way back to France he would become a protagonist in the rebellion of Siena against Spanish rule, and the establishment of French protection for the republic. As the ordinary French ambassador in Rome found himself losing favour, Lanssac was selected to replace him in the charge in 1553. He thus played a central role in the crisis of Siena that culminated in 1554 with the disastrous French loss at Marciano, shortly after which he became a prisoner of the duke of Florence. Released before the end of the year he would serve again as an extraordinary ambassador to the Papacy on occasion. At the end of 1556, Lanssac seriously alienated the Pope's nephew the cardinale di Carafa (cardinal of Carafa) and thus was relieved of his responsibilities. He participated in the duc de Montmorency's (duke of Montmorency's) disastrous Picard campaign that culminated in the spectacular French defeat at Saint-Quentin after which he was again made prisoner.

In 1559, after the conclusion of the Italian Wars, Henry II died and was succeeded by his son Francis II. He was tasked with accompanying the king's sister Élisabeth to be united with her new Spanish husband, the king Philip II of Spain. At the outbreak of the first French War of Religion, Lanssac was conducting a diplomatic mission to the Papacy. He would be tasked with leading the French delegation for the church Council of Trento where he championed French precedence fiercely. From 1563 to 1564 he was involved in the negotiations with England that brought about the treaty of Troyes by which England renounced its claim to Calais. That year he was given an extraordinary diplomatic mission to Spain to flag a number of French concerns, to which Philip responded magnanimously. The queen mother Catherine was at this time conducting a tour of the kingdom to enforce the peace that had brought the first French War of Religion to a close. Lanssac played a role in the tour in Guyenne, before going on a diplomatic mission to the Empire. Lanssac was involved in the negotiations that brought the second French War of Religion to a close in March 1568. After the short peace, civil war returned and Lanssac played a military role in the third French War of Religion, trying and failing to besiege La Charité for the crown. In 1573 he received his most significant office when he was established as the queen mother Catherine's chevalier d'honneur (knight of honour), a position he would hold for the rest of his life.

At the advent of the reign of Henry III in 1574, Lanssac was a member of the royal conseil d'État (council of state). In 1578, when Catherine undertook a tour of the southern parts of the kingdom that were troubled by disorder, Lanssac participated in her mission and the negotiations with the Protestants that produced the treaty of Nérac in 1579. That year he was made a chevalier (knight) of the Ordre du Saint-Esprit (Order of Saint-Esprit), the most senior order of French chivalry. He took part in the grand diplomatic mission to England in 1581 to try and secure an agreement (without success) of marriage between the king's brother Alençon and the English queen Elizabeth I. He would be with Catherine for the attempts to reconcile Alençon with the French crown from 1582 to the prince's death in 1584. With his death the Catholic Ligue (League) was re-founded to oppose a Protestant succession to the French throne. Lanssac would be involved in negotiations with the ligueur (leaguer) leader the duc de Guise in 1585 to end the ligue rebellion. Forced, by the terms of his peace with the ligue to fight the Protestants, Henri's mother Catherine and Lanssac would again attempt negotiations in 1587 to resolve the new civil war diplomatically, without result. After Henri assassinated the ligueur leader the duc de Guise in 1588, Lanssac retired from court. He would die at his estates of Précy-sur-Oise in 1593.

== Early life and family ==
=== Parentage and family ===
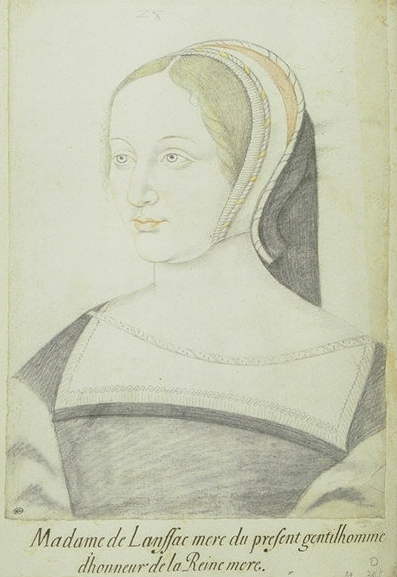
Jacquette de Lansac, mother to Louis de Saint-Gelais

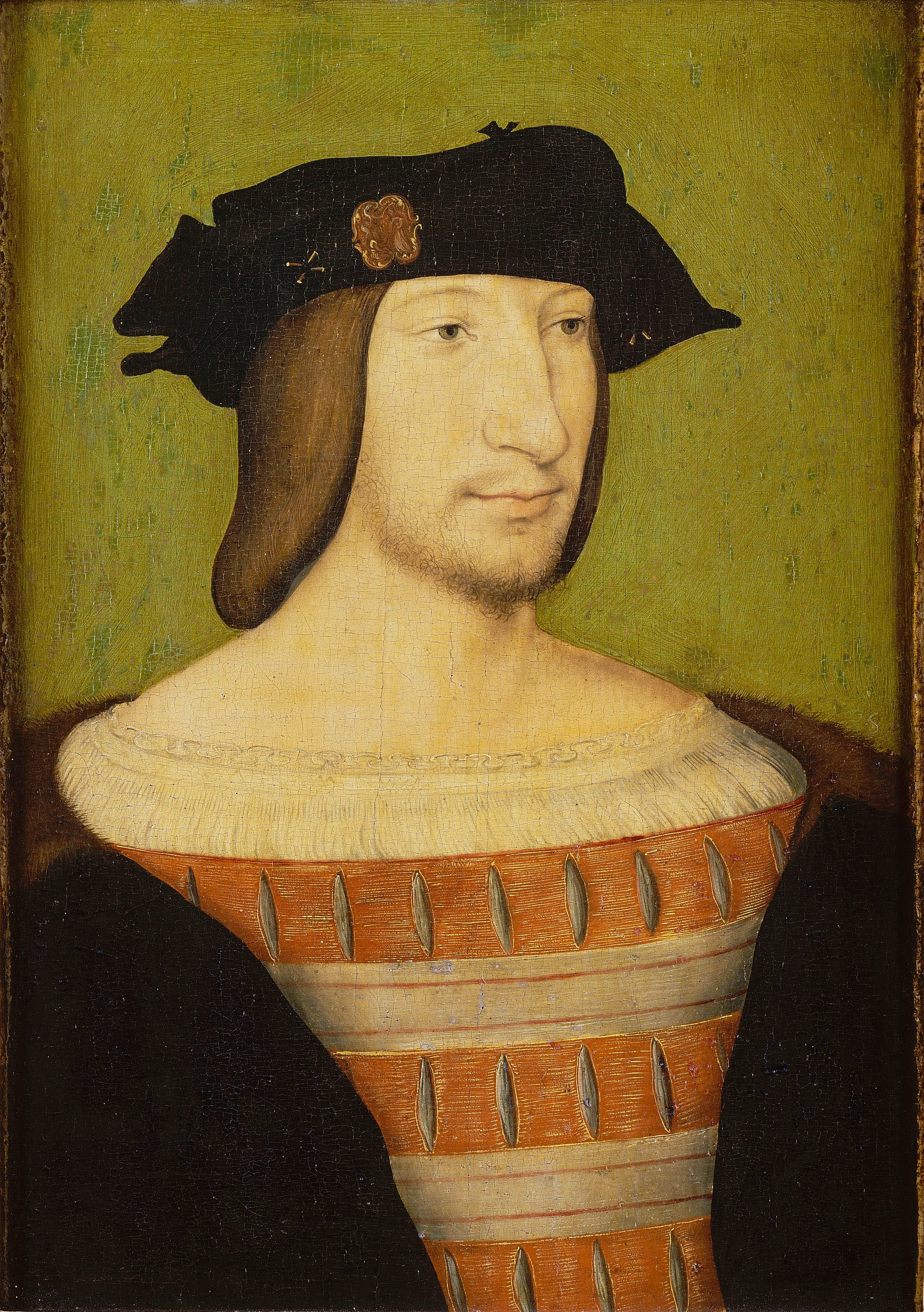
Francis I, first comte d'Angoulême, then duc de Valois, then king of France in 1515. Probable illegitimate father of Louis de Saint-Gelais

Louis de Saint-Gelais (addressed by his title, the seigneur de Lanssac throughout the majority of this article) was born in 1512 (perhaps at Cornefeu near Cognac), likely the illegitimate son of the French king Francis I and Jacquette de Lansac, as was the belief during his lifetime. Jacquette de Lansac was married to Alexandre de Saint-Gelais (–1522), the seigneur de Cornefou, Romefort and Breuil du Loup, who was often absent. Alexandre served as a chambellan and advisor at the court of the king of Navarre before transferring to the service of Louis XII, and Francis I to whom he served a similar role. Jacquette de Lansac for her part possessed the seigneuries of Lanssac, d'Ambès, Clérac and Saint-Savin.

The Saint-Gelais were a Poitevin family that had historically been servants of the kings of Navarre before entering royal service in the fifteenth century. For the historian Le Roux, the success of Lanssac in royal service would reflect the integration of the noblesse seconde (secondary nobility) into the administration of the state in this period. As the son of Francis I Louis was the half-brother of king Henry II.

=== Marriage ===
==== First marriage ====
Around 1543 Louis de Saint-Gelais married Jeanne de La Roche-Andry who brought the lands of La Roche-Andry around Angoulême with her to the marriage.

With Jeanne de La Roche-Andry, Louis had the following issue:

- Guy de Saint-Gelais (3 December 1544–) married Antoinette Raffin in 1571 and had issue (Alexandre de Saint-Gelais and Artus de Saint-Gelais).
- Claude de Saint-Gelais, married the comte de Luxe in 1564.

Claude's marriage to the comte de Luxe (count of Luxe) was a design of the queen mother Catherine's (the wife of Henry II and thus Louis' half sister-in-law). By this marriage Catherine hoped to secure the loyalty of an important Protestant seigneur who served as the lieutenant-general of La Soule in French Navarre in the absence of the king of Navarre and capitaine (captain) de Mauléon.

With the backing of Catherine and the king Charles in 1570, matrimonial negotiations were undertaken to match his eldest son Guy with the Mlle de Morvillier. Lanssac was unable to bring success to this project for his son. His son would instead marry Antoinette Raffin the following year, a glowing match for Lanssac as she was the daughter of the sénéchal d'Agen (seneschal of Agen) François Raffin.

==== Second marriage ====
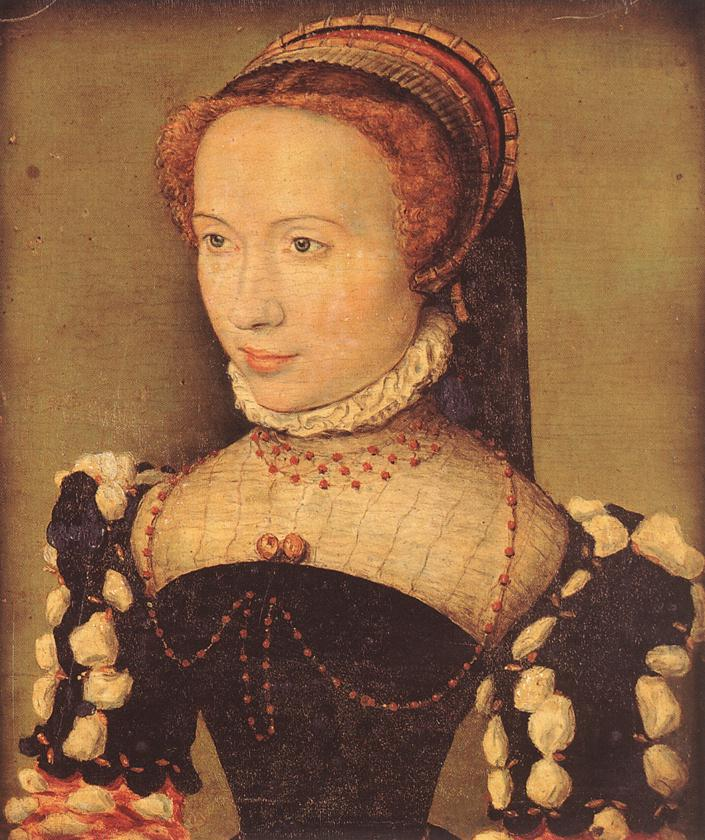
Gabrielle de Rochechouart, second wife to Lanssac

Lanssac's first wife Jeanne died in 1563. Lanssac wrote to the Pope that the cause of her death was not the illness but rather the difficulty of seeing her husband and sons in constant danger. On 8 October 1565, Lanssac remarried to Gabrielle de Rochechouart. She was a twice widow of the seigneur de Martigné-Briand and then the baron de Ruffec. Charles gave the couple 10,000 livres for the occasion of their marriage. The historian Lhoumeau speculates that she must have been very rich, due to the fact her brother René was described as the 'king of Poitou' due to his wealth. At the time of this marriage, Lanssac ceded to his son Guy his seigneuries in the Angoumois, Poitou and Guyenne for a value of 135,000 livres, but maintained control of the usufruct. In 1567, she would become one of the queen mother Catherine's 35 dames.

With Gabrielle de Rochechouart he had the following issue:

- Charles de Saint-Gelais, sieur du Précy (c. 1568–1591). Died without issue.
- François de Saint-Gelais, sieur de Vernou (1570–c. 1592). Abbot of Saint-Lô and Saint-Vincent-de-Bourg, chaplain to the queen mother Catherine and after surrendering his abbeys, gentilhomme de la chambre du roi (gentleman of the king's chamber) and capitaine de cinquante hommes d'armes (captain of fifty men at arms). Died without issue.

Gabrielle would survive her husband by a few years. In June 1594 she drew up her will and bequeathed her property and land to her granddaughter-in-law, by Lanssac's daughter Claude de Saint-Gelais, Charlotte-Catherine de Luxe who had recently married Louis de Montmorency-Bouteville.

While pursuing a military career, Lanssac also had an illegitimate son:

- Urbain de Saint-Gelais (1540–), bishop of Comminges and ambassador to Portugal.

=== Lands ===
In 1576, Lanssac, through the resources of his second wife, purchased the baronnie de La Mothe-Saint-Héraye in Poitou (valued at 140,000 livres in 1604) from Françoise de Birague, thereby acquiring possession of the château de La Mothe-Saint-Héraye. It had been subject to a siege in 1569 and thus Lanssac oversaw its repairs. From the time of its acquisition until 1580, Lanssac paid for a small garrison in the château to prevent it being surprised. However, Lanssac chafed under this cost, and in 1580 succeeded in getting the French king Henry III to transfer the cost to the royal governor of Poitou the comte du Lude. He would play host at this château to the queen mother Catherine and the king of Navarre. He also had a Parisian hôtel (grand residence) on the rue Saint-Honoré composed of several buildings and gardens. At Catherine's request he hosted foreign ambassadors here. A man of culture, he also welcomed poets, artists, painters and sculptors to this hôtel. It would be his lands around Paris that became the focus of his attentions as opposed to those he held in the south-west of the kingdom. The centre of his new territory was Précy-sur-Oise where he bought up plots of land from 1570 to 1587.

=== Clients, friends and patronage ===
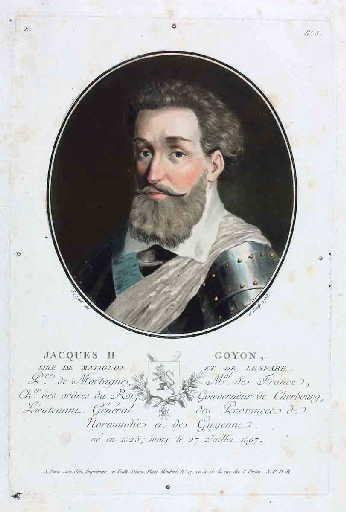
Maréchal de Matignon, with whom Lanssac enjoyed a mutually beneficial relationship

He enjoyed friendly relations with the seigneur de Saint-Sulpice, the principal baron of Quercy and ambassador to Spain. In 1576 the eldest son of Saint-Sulpice was assassinated by the vicomte de Tours (viscount of Tours) during the meeting of the Estates General. Lanssac wrote his sympathies to the baron and proffered his support in attaining revenge against the vicomte. He wrote again to Saint-Sulpice to let him know that the vicomte de Tours had been beheaded in absentia (i.e. a model of Tours had been beheaded due to the actual Tours' flight from the court to escape punishment). Another associate of Lanssac's was maréchal de Matignon (marshal of Matignon). Lanssac sent the maréchal letters assuring him of the good favour in which the queen mother Catherine held him. In return for Matignon scouting out vacant abbeys in his governate of Basse-Normandie for Lanssac and his sons, Lanssac intervened with Catherine to ensure that the governor received the proceeds of property seized from Protestants in his province.

The Saint-Gelais family served as the patrons for Isaac Habert, a poet, securing for Isaac a position as a sécretaire du roi (secretary of the king). Lanssac's friendship with the writer Montaigne saw the latter dedicate a work to him, he likewise enjoyed warm relations with the political theorist La Boétie. He was also a recipient of epistles and verses written in Italian. The poet du Bellay honoured him with an ode celebrating his eloquence.

In addition to competency with Italian, he was well versed in Castilian, German, English and Latin. Due to his linguistic skill with Castilian he often participated in the Spanish diplomatic audiences with the French king as an interpreter. His constant presence was greatly to the irritation of the Spanish ambassador Álava who complained about it to the Spanish king.

=== Incomes ===
In total his annual incomes from the crown for his various offices totalled around 16,000 livres. 10,000 livres of this was his pension. His personal lands brought him a further 11,000 livres a year, with another 10,000 of rentes (annuities) on the hôtel de ville (town hall) and 10,000 from the lands of the bishopric of Saint-Bertrand-de-Comminges. Thus his ordinary incomes equalled around 47,000 livres. Beyond these revenues he was a recipient of many royal gifts between 1565 and 1583, totalling around 171,000 livres. For example, in 1568 he shared in a royal gift of 10,544 livres. As a result of this advantageous financial position he was able to make a loan of 16,000 livres to the trésorier de la récette générale (treasurer of the general revenues) of Bordeaux in 1567. A product of the great royal patronage he enjoyed was a considerable taste for luxury and spending that was noted by his contemporary, the soldier the sieur de Mauvissière.

In his capacity as capitaine de la seconde compagnie des cent gentilshommes de la maison du roi (captain of the second company of a hundred gentleman of the king's household) in the year 1576–1577 Lanssac enjoyed a royal pension of 200 livres. In 1573, it would be as this officer that he would be provided 140 livres to distribute as alms during the holy week. One of the soldiers in his compagnie, the sieur de Riches, would serve as an agent of Lanssac's for the collection of money owed to him by the tenant farmers on his lands.

Royal favour was not a one way flow of money, and Lanssac was among those the king Henry III expected to make loans to the crown. The repayment of the money to the officials from which it was loaned was not always a guarantee.

=== Temperament ===
Of a moderate Catholic disposition, in 1566 he even found himself accused of having eaten meat during Lent. His daughter Claude married a Protestant seigneur (the comte de Luxe). In royal council he was far more concerned with the re-establishment of royal authority than religious considerations. Lanssac had much concern for his honour. He opined that his honour was based on two sources: himself, and god.

Lanssac was frequently turned to as a diplomat for the crown, and according to the memoirist Brantôme undertook around thirty embassies during his life.

=== Early years ===
In the absence of her husband Alexandre, Lanssac's mother Jacquette often resided at Cognac, where the mother of Francis I held her court. She became a prominent staple of the Cognac court, where the duc de Valois (duke of Valois - future king Francis) resided until 1512 when he moved to Amboise. In that year he is supposed to have had an affair with Jacquette, who thus gave birth to a son named Louis in 1513.

Upon the death of his mother's husband, Alexandre, on 20 June 1522, the rights and wages of the office of garde des sceaux de la chancellerie de Bordeaux (holder of the seals of the chancellery of Bordeaux) that Alexandre had enjoyed in his lifetime reverted to his putative son, Lanssac. While Lanssac was still a minor, the office was exercised by Sauvat de Pommiers in his stead.

At some point his mother remarried to the baron de Mirambeau.

== Early career ==
=== Capitaine de Bourg ===
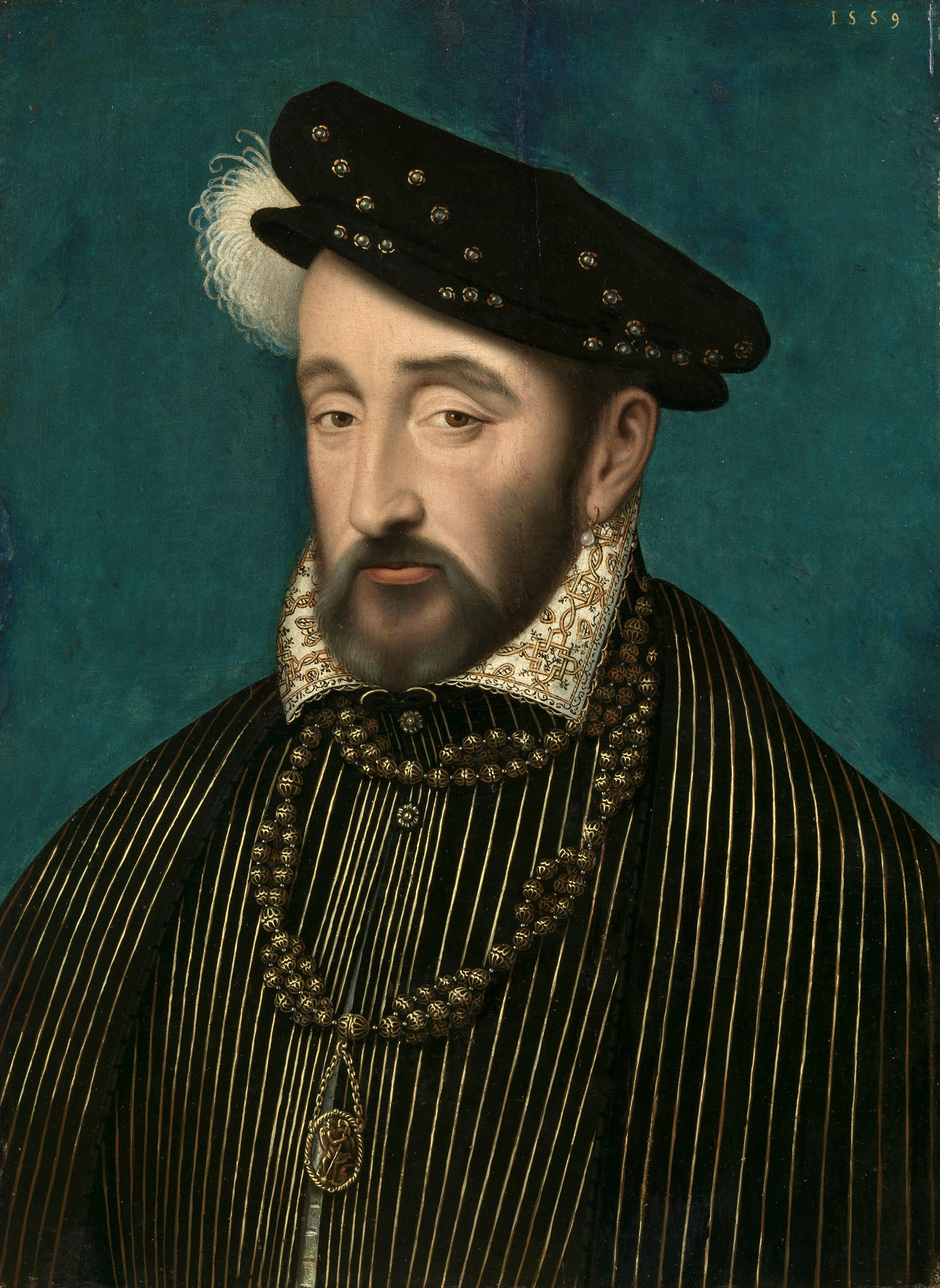
Henry II, king of France who succeeded Francis I to the crown in 1547

Upon the death of the sieur de Langoiran who held the captaincy of Bourg and its château, Lanssac was invested in these charges by king Francis by letters patent of 28 June 1536. Upon the death of his mother he assumed the name of one of her seigneuries, that of Lanssac, by which he would be known for the rest of his life. In an earlier agreement he had made he had been known as the seigneur d'Ambérac. When he was not residing in Guyenne he spent his time at the French court where his education was furthered by masters.

He undertook military service in the Italian Wars against the Holy Roman Emperor, and it was in this context in 1540 that he fathered an illegitimate son.

With the death of the king Francis I in 1547, Lanssac continued to enjoy great favour at the French court as his half-brother Henry II ascended to the French throne. Henri saw the valuable diplomatic qualities that Lanssac possessed. Thus when his reign was quickly troubled by a revolt against the Gabelle (salt tax) known as the Revolt of the Pitauds, which spread out from Guîtres to the provinces of Guyenne, Saintonge and the Angoumois, it was to Lanssac he turned to appease the popular anger. Lanssac had kept the peace in his captaincy Bourg at a time when disorders rocked Saintes, Cognac, Ruffec and Saint-André. Indeed, he formed a company known as the Mandillots blancs for the purpose of combatting the peasants.

After the revolt had been suppressed, Lanssac took a mission for the duc d'Aumale (known from 1550 as the duc de Guise) in March 1549 to bring him news of the duc de Vendôme (king of Navarre from 1555). He then returned to court. According to the historian Lhoumeau at this time Lanssac was in the clientele of the Lorraine-Guise family.

By the year 1550, Lanssac found himself in the service of the royal favourite the connétable de Montmorency (connétable - constable was the supreme military office in the French kingdom). The historian Le Roux highlights the flourishing correspondence between the two men at this time. The historian Romier describes Lanssac as Montmorency's 'creature and favourite' during the early 1550s. For the historian Harding, Lanssac was a protégé of the connétable.

=== English mission ===
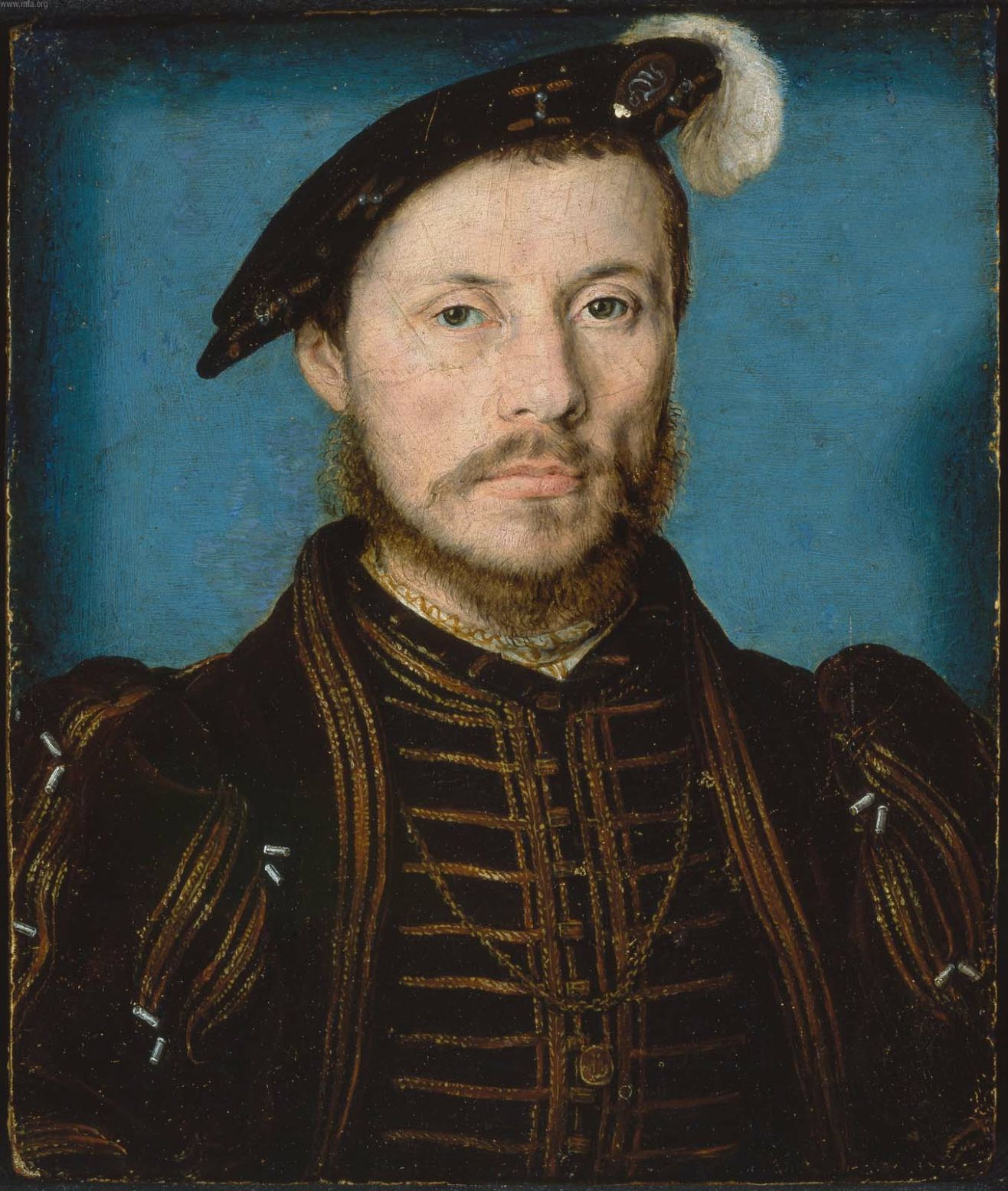
Duc de Montmorency, who would serve as the patron of Lanssac at the French court for much of the 1550s

It being clear Lanssac had a greater proclivity for statecraft than the bearing of arms, Henri entrusted him with an extraordinary ambassadorial mission to England in 1550 for the purpose of soothing the discord between England and Scotland. Henri gave him a letter for the French ordinary ambassador in England the seigneur de Chemault dated to 23 January. Lanssac arrived in London on 30 January 1551. Whilst in England he examined the grievances of the English and the Scottish, before expressing Henri's determination to continue his support of the Scottish demands, which were in his opinion 'just'. He was present for the privy council meetings of 1 and 14 February, at which the English claims were presented to him and the ordinary ambassador Chemault. This accomplished he returned to France to report on the nature of affairs to Henri. With a firm position presented to England by the French, the English crown resolved to adopt a conciliatory path. Sir William Pickering was sent as an English representative to France, where he assured Henri of the good intentions of the English king Edward VI. At Blois in March, Lanssac presented Pickering with a fine necklace at Henry's instigation.

Henri sent Lannsac back to England, with the Scottish diplomat Thomas, Master of Erskine, to join as commissioners in negotiations alongside his ambassador Chemault. Lanssac presented Edward with a letter from Henri and took part in the privy council meeting of 5 April 1551. Shortly after his arrival in Edinburgh, the treaty of Boulogne was signed on 20 April. Lanssac then served as the chief negotiator for Henry in further negotiations with a host of English commissioners that produced the subsidiary treaty of Norham on 16 June. This treaty settled the dispute between England and Scotland over their shared border. The establishment of this peace did not end unease in England as to French designs as regarded Scotland, indeed Lanssac was asked by the earl of Warwick whether Henri referred to the young Scottish queen Mary as his daughter.

Thanks to the patronage of Montmorency, Lanssac was made a panetier du roi (king's baker) in 1551.

=== Imperial mission ===
In early 1552, Henri entered into alliance with several Protestant German princes. He subsequently launched a campaign into the Empire that saw the capture by France of the Three Bishoprics: Toul, Verdun and Metz. Lanssac participated in this campaign. While campaigning, Henri became aware that the Imperial duke of Saxony intended to leave the French alliance and join with the Holy Roman Emperor. Lanssac was dispatched to entreat with Sachsen. Departing Saverne on 3 May he united with Sachsen on 10 May at Gundelfingen. The herzog apologised for causing Henri to doubt his fidelity, but noted that he had promised the king of the Romans (Ferdinand - brother to the Holy Roman Emperor) that he would assist for three months in the campaign against the Ottoman Empire. When he reported back his discussions to Henry, the king was in no doubt that Sachsen had betrayed him.

=== Papal mission ===
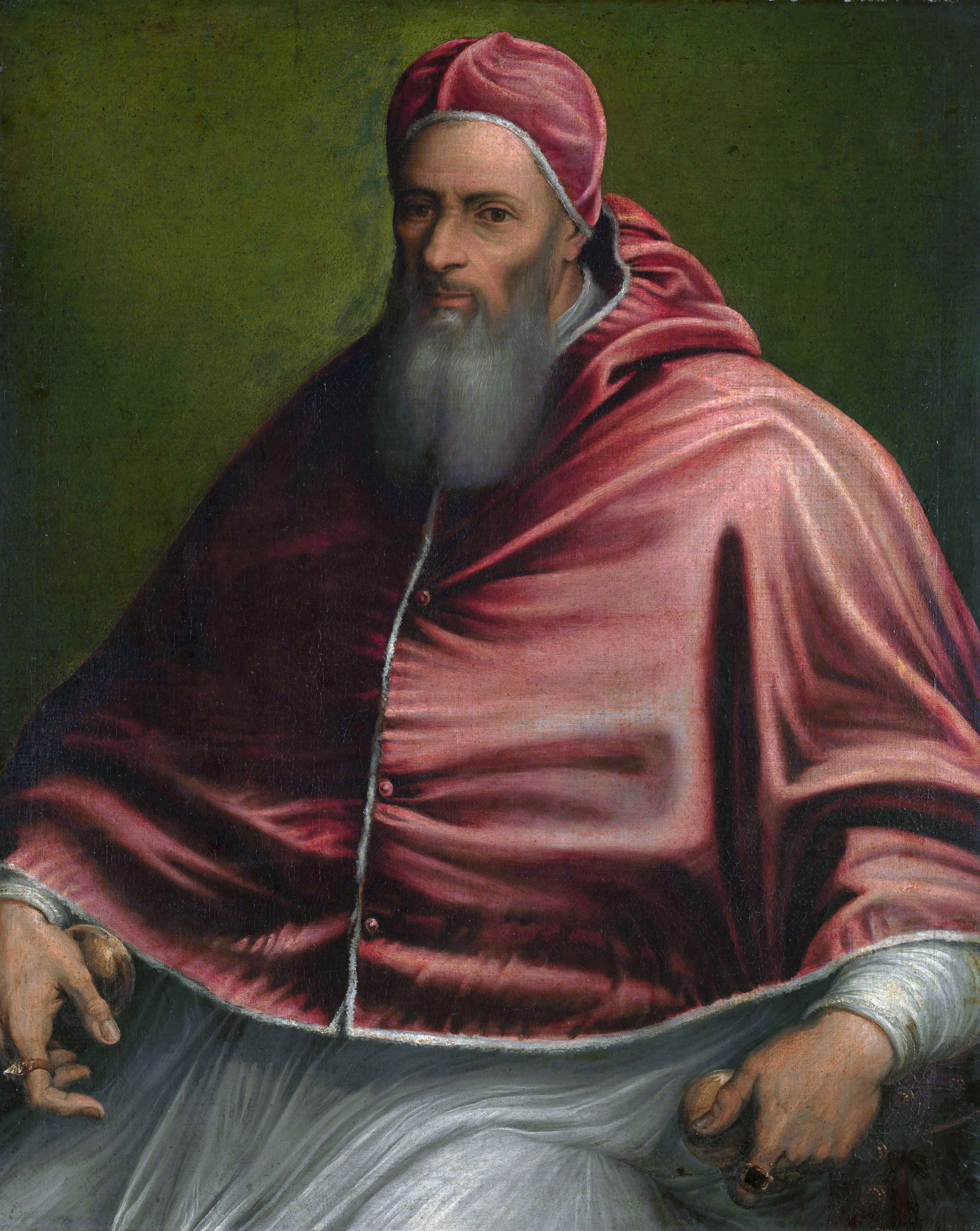
Pope Julius III, who held his office from 1550 to 1555 and under whom Lanssac would serve as French ambassador

There had been conflict between France and the Papacy in 1551 in the form of the War of Parma. In early 1552, the cardinal de Tournon was in Rome to undertake negotiations between the French crown and the Papacy. On 29 April he entered into a treaty with the pope Julius III. Through this agreement hostilities between France and the Holy See were suspended for a two-year period. The Pope hoped to see this agreement broadened to include Piemonte and Milan. The duca di Parma (duke of Parma) was to be maintained in the possession of his ducato (duchy), and his brother Orazio restored to possession of the ducato di Castro (duchy of Castro). The conti di Mirandola (count of Mirandola) was similarly assured as to the possession of his territories. The measures that had been taken during the war to prejudice the families of Strozzi, Orsini and Fregosi who had allied themselves with the French king Henri (including sentences of execution and confiscations) were similarly abolished for a two-year period. Diplomatic relations were restored between France and the Holy See, with the bishop of Mirepoix to serve as the French ordinary ambassador in Rome. The Pope assured the cardinal de Tournon he would work towards the liberation from Imperial captivity of the connétable de Montmorency's nephew the seigneur d'Andelot.

On 18 May, Tournon departed from Rome to make his way back to France. He hoped to see a more general peace go beyond the one he had negotiated to create peace also between the French king and the Holy Roman Emperor. Tournon made a triumphal entry into Lyon on 28 September. Arches had been erected in the city to celebrate the lifting of the siege of Mirandola and the throwing off of Spanish occupation by the Sienese. Already aware of the terms negotiated by his representative before his return to France, Henri endeavoured to send an extraordinary diplomatic mission to Rome to indicate his assent to the terms. This had initially been intended to be undertaken by the sieur de Langey, brother to cardinal du Bellay. However instead it would be Montmorency's man, Lanssac who was entrusted with taking Henri's ratification of the treaty to Rome. Lanssac departed from the court at Damvilliers to this end on 4 June 1552. In addition to this extraordinary mission, the new ordinary diplomatic representative appointed by Henry in May the bishop of Mirepoix travelled to Rome.

Lanssac arrived in Rome on 25 June, he found the Pope in good humour. In addition to the ratification he brought with him he also sought to achieve the elevation to the cardinalate of the bishop of Albi. Lanssac made a good impression upon the people of the city, and Julius thanked Henri for the good graces of his extraordinary ambassador. At the time of his departure from Rome on 28 July, the Pope offered Lanssac a diamond from his finger.

== Siena ==
=== Throwing off the Spanish 'yoke' ===
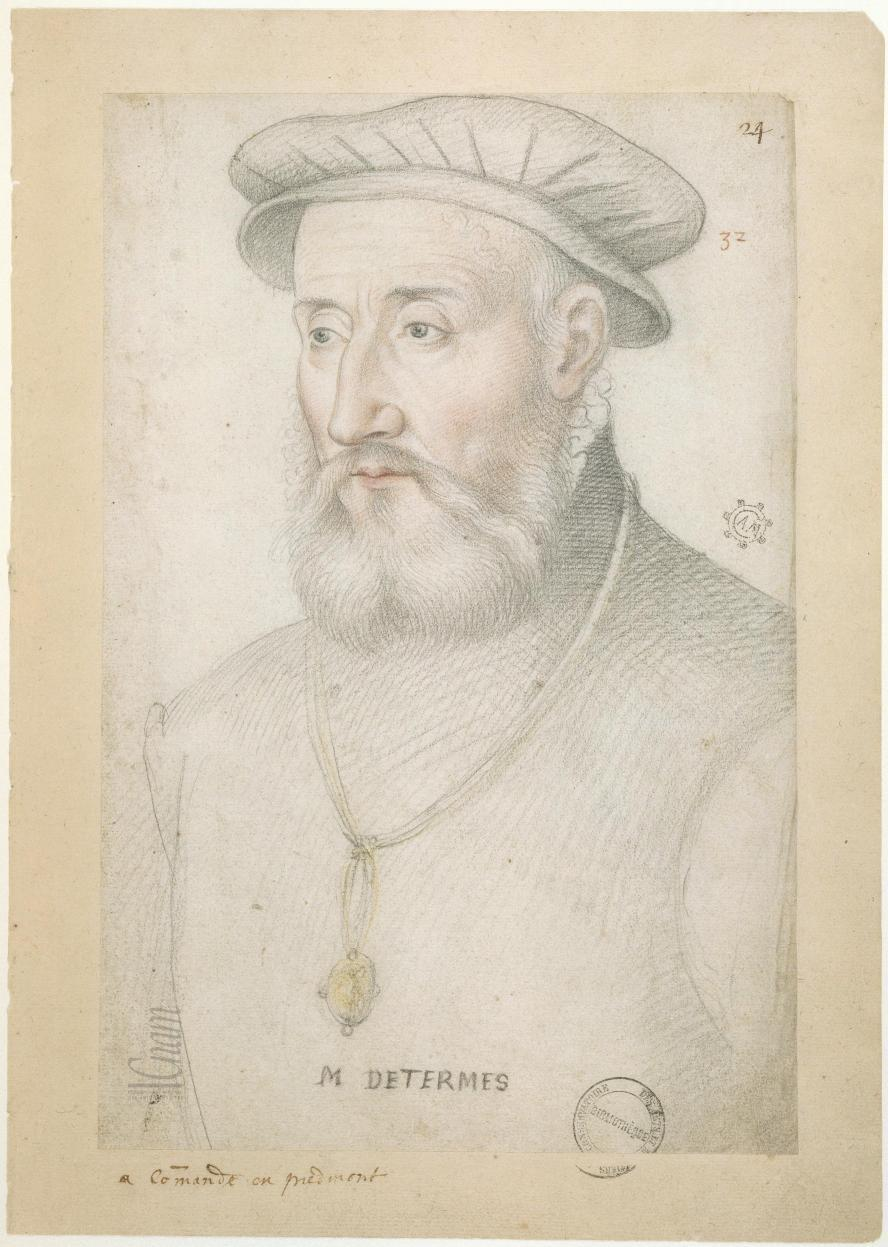
Seigneur de Thermes who arrived in Siena to take over from Lanssac

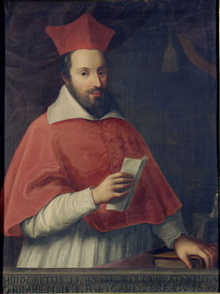
Cardinale d'Este who would serve as France's chief representative in French occupied Siena until January 1554

The French agents and allies in the Italian peninsula met at Chioggia from 15 to 18 July 1552 to (according to the historian Cloulas) plan how to best create a suitable diversion from the main French offensive in Lorraine. The historian Durot interprets the meeting differently, as reflecting Henri's desire to realise a grand plan of universal domination. The historian Lhoumeau attests to the involvement of Lanssac in these talks. The prospect of an invasion of the kingdom of Naples by an expeditionary force was considered and dismissed. The representatives at Chioggia were cautious, and had failed to secure the backing of Venice for their designs. It was thus rather resolved for there to be a French intervention in the republic of Siena. Siena boasted a strong position well flanked by hill country, had good disembarkation points for naval landings and inhabitants who chafed under their Spanish garrison.

Not long after the meeting at Chioggia, the French bore witness to the population of Siena (buoyed by French money) rising up on 26 July 1552 against their Spanish garrison and drive them from the city to cries of 'Francia! Francia!' Romier sees the cardinal de Tournon as the architect of this uprising. Lanssac arrived in the city on 30 July, on his way back from his extraordinary mission in Rome, with money, expressions of Henry's gratitude and assurances of French support for the uprising of the inhabitants. The revolution came at an opportune time for Henry, coinciding as it did with the raising of forces by the Emperor to besiege Metz. Lanssac received a very warm reception, with the inhabitants gifting him twelve écus on 31 July despite their great poverty. On 1 August he was spontaneously invested by the people of Siena with military command of the city. The day that followed, four deputies were chosen to keep him appraised of internal and external developments. Lanssac succeeded in securing the love of the French cause from the inhabitants of Siena by offering them possession of the citadel which in Spanish hands had been the cause of their rebellion. By this means he avoided the risk that the French arrival would be seen as a transfer from being under one yoke to under another. The citadel was thus destroyed, with the French representatives the first to take their tools to it. He further distributed the funds of the king that he had with him generously, to the garrison, people and 'public needs'. His generosity was such that several days after his arrival he was urged to moderate his generosity, lest he make it difficult for Siena to repay him. On 4 August the people of Siena wrote to Henri expressing their gratitude to him for restoring their 'ancient liberties'. Lanssac had only intended to pass through Siena, and thus a few days after his arrival he was followed by the seigneur de Thermes, alongside the exiled Spanish noble, the duque de Soma (duke of Soma) on 11 August, the former of whom assumed the military leadership of Siena. Thermes did not possess the same magnetic quality Lanssac enjoyed, but found himself quickly able to secure favour in Siena. On 16 August as Lanssac was about to depart from Siena, the citizens of the city voted 383 to 29 to grant Lanssac and Thermes citizenship of the city, with all the privileges this entailed. Meanwhile cardinale d'Este was entrusted with acting as lieutenant-general for the French king in Siena. Thermes in particular, was to prepare the city for a Spanish-Imperial counter-stroke, which was surely to follow.

On 20 August 1552, Lanssac's letter informing of the seizure of the citadel of Siena from the Spanish, arrived at Villers-Cotterêts where the French court was stay. Word of this development was greeted with great joy by all the courtiers with the exception of Lanssac's patron, the connétable de Montmorency.

Both the Pope, and the duke of Florence were unnerved by the French move to assume overlordship of Siena. When the Sienese sent an ambassador to the latter on 28 July he responded with an ambassador of his own offering insincere friendship. On 5 August 1552, Florence received the honour of Sienese citizenship. The duke of Florence was given to understand that the queen of France, Catherine desired to see the recent revolution in Siena expanded to Florence. He further feared that Siena would serve as a base for the fuorusciti (Florentine noble political exiles) of Florence. Florence preferred to operate discreetly and attempted to negotiate a capitulation with the city of Siena independent of the involvement of French agents. However Lanssac discovered this manoeuvre and alerted Tournon who thus oversaw negotiations for Siena which regulated relations with Florence. With this plan frustrated, Florence took on a new policy which he would maintain for the coming year by which he professed his great friendship to Siena and France in the hopes that feeling secure the French would reduce the support they provided to Siena. On his way back to France on 18 August Lanssac passed through Florence. The duke of Florence put on a good face for Lanssac, assuring him he intended to support the newfound freedoms enjoyed by Siena. According to Romier this was entirely disingenuous.

In private correspondence with the comte du Lude in September, Lanssac spoke excitedly about the military advantage the French could gain from Siena. He noted that there were several good sea ports, and that it represented around a third of Tuscany.

=== Metz mission ===
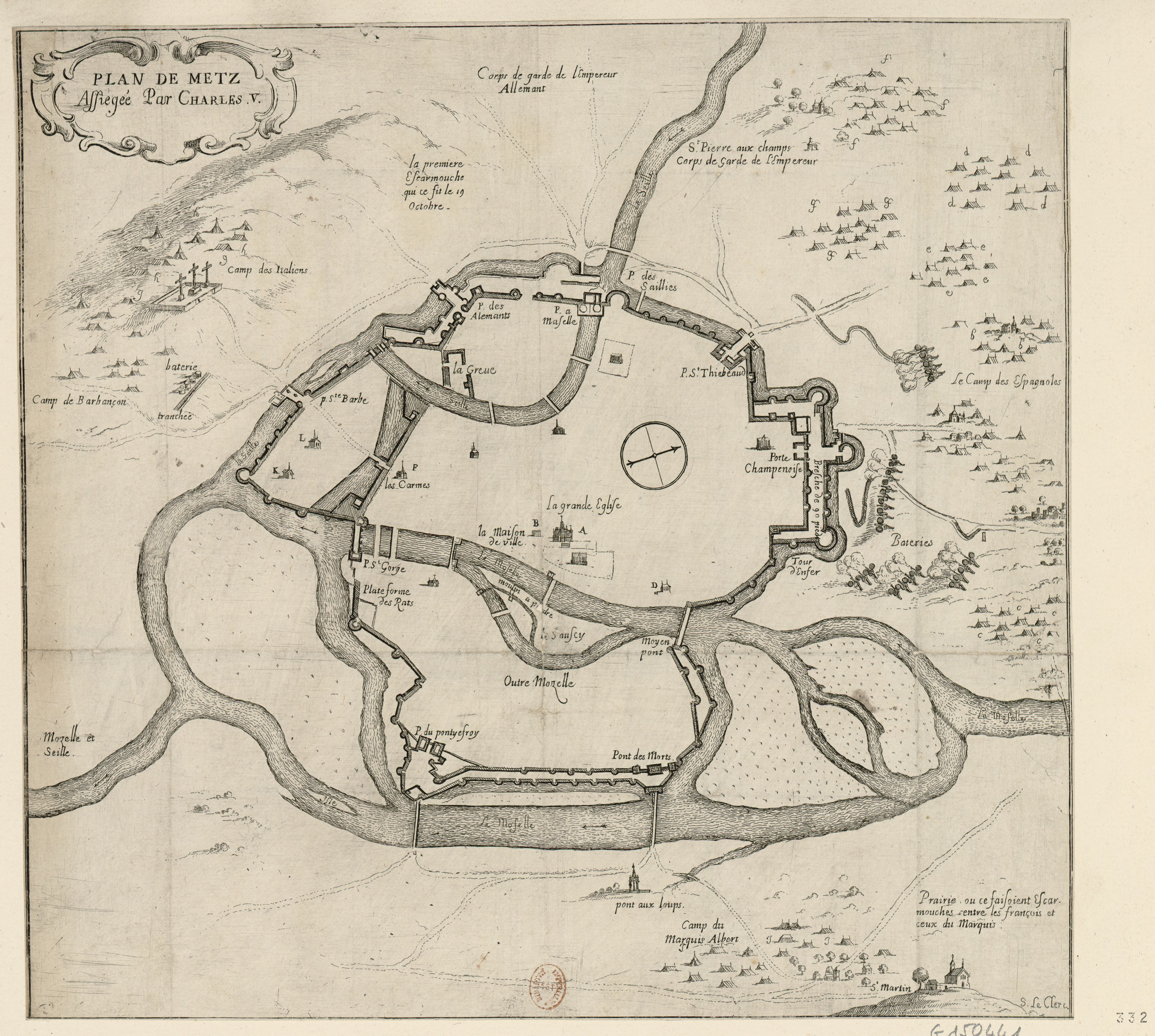
Conduct of the siege of Metz by the Holy Roman Emperor

After the defection of the herzog von Sachsen from the French cause, (he had signed the Peace of Passau with the Emperor in September), there began to be unease about the other German French ally the duke of Prussia who brought his force outside Metz, which was imminently to be besieged by the Emperor. He claimed to still be in the service of Henry, however this being in doubt he was refused entry into the city, and had to retire to Pont-à-Mousson. The nephew of Montmorency, the seigneur de Coligny made an offer to the herzog of 150,000 écus in return for his service to France through September and October 1552, or 50,000 écus for his withdrawal from the Metz area. The herzog rejected these proposals as beneath him, and he was thus offered 100,000 écus to fight against the Emperor in the Netherlands. This he accepted, but only if he could immediately have word of Henri's designs as concerned him. Lanssac was thus dispatched to negotiate with him on 23 September. Negotiations would continue until 11 October. Montmorency had provided Lanssac instructions to get the German prince to head away to the Netherlands to make war against the Emperor. He was to receive 40,000 écus up front, and when he arrived at a predetermined location he would be granted the other 60,000. He was to enjoy the provisions of food until his departure from Lorraine. The herzog in Preußen did not follow along with these negotiations and the talks collapsed. Indeed, when the army of the Emperor arrived to put Metz to siege, the herzog would participate in the failed reduction of the city alongside him.

The French ordinary ambassador in Rome, the bishop of Mirepoix found himself increasingly unpopular the French court by February 1553 due to his pro-Papal enthusiasm, which now seemed a sour thing at the French court where once it had been an asset.

=== Imperial attack on Siena ===
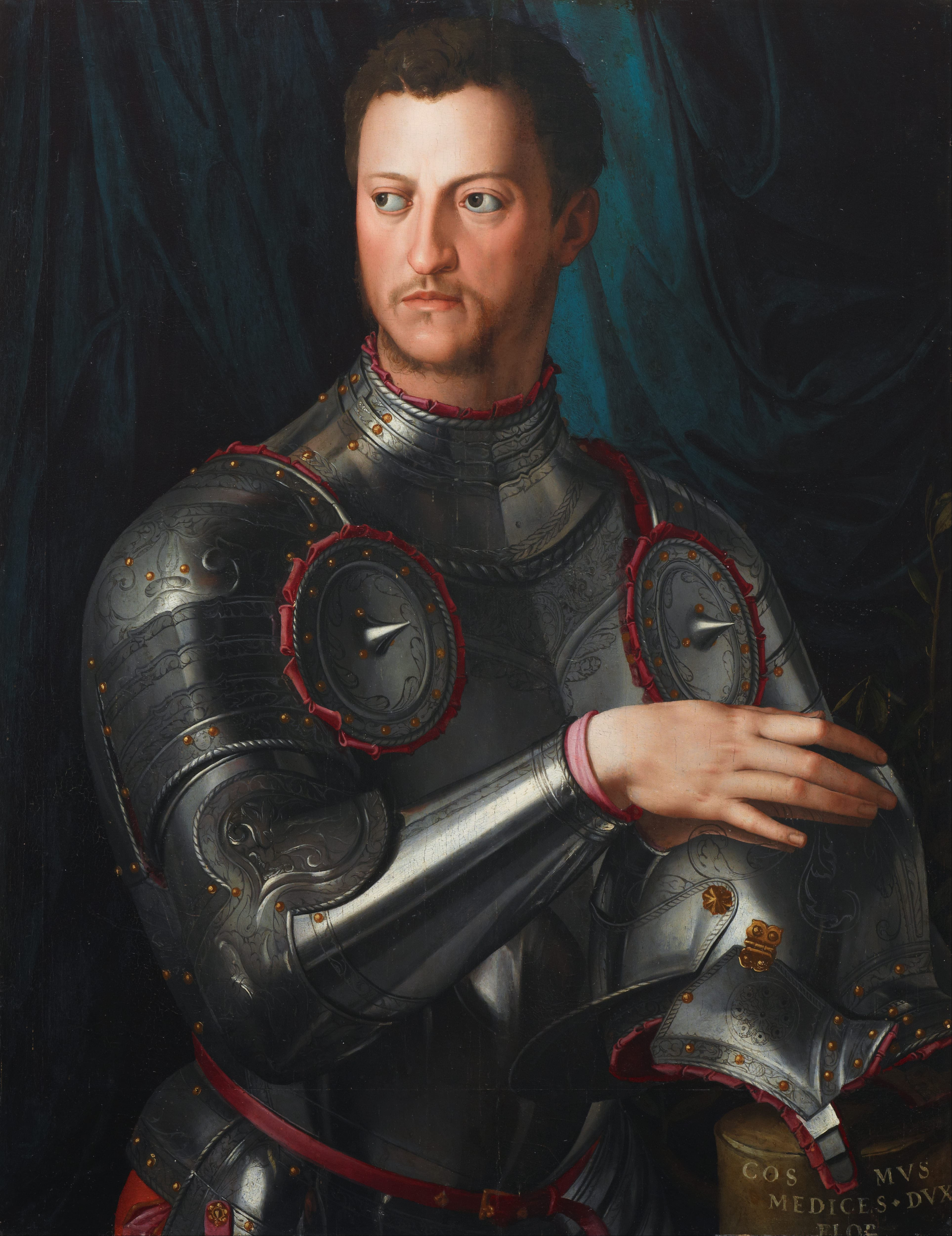
Duke of Florence who opposed the French occupation of Siena

An Imperial army under the command of the marqués de Villefranca (marquis of Villefranca) started an advance on Siena, and captured various villages. When the marqués died in February 1553 he was replaced by his son in the command. The Imperial campaign was supported by the Duke of Florence. The Pope had reached an understanding with the Duke of Florence that would see his nephew, Fabiano del Monte carved out a principality from Sienese territory. When Henri learned of Papal logistic support for the Spanish-Imperial effort in Siena, he was vexed that he had not learned of this development from his ambassador in Rome. The bishop of Mirepoix found no one to defend him on the royal council, with the Lorraine-Guise family hostile to him due to his having been a rival candidate for the cardinal de Guise's elevation to the cardinalate, the fuorusciti on the council desiring an ambassador who might see the Pope detached from the Duke of Florence and Montmorency subscribed to the hostile views of the ambassadors sécretaire de Boucher. Therefore, Mirepoix was disgraced, and Lanssac chosen to replace him in the charge. Having received instructions to bring Julius into the French alliance he departed Saint-Germain to take up the posting on 3 April. Lanssac's patron Montmorency in particular had settled on the position that France did not need a costly debacle, and that Lanssac should do what he could to protect the French treasury from expenditure through a negotiated settlement that preserved the liberty of Siena and the king's honour. While it had initially been intended that the cardinal de Châtillon would serve as his protector in the Papal capital, Châtillon excused himself from departing France on the grounds of an illness. Therefore, it would be the cardinal du Bellay that travelled into Italy with Lanssac. The Pope was enraged to learn of the disgrace of Mirepoix and blamed the ambassador's sécretaire Boucher. The bishop of Mirepoix would die in Rome on 26 April, of a ruptured blood vessel, a few days before Lanssac could arrive in the city. Though it had been intended for Lanssac to travel to Rome via Venice, so that he might bolster the French cause there, the collapse of the health of the bishop of Mirepoix forced him to instead travel straight to Rome, stopping only in Ferrara to greet the duca di Ferrara and discuss terms as related to Siena with the Papal legate.

Concurrent to his elevation to the position of ambassador in March 1553 Lanssac was relieved of his posting as the capitaine of Bourg. This was due to his simultaneous elevation as a gentilhomme de la chambre du roi (gentleman of the king's chamber). This role was, according to Le Roux, indicative of his desire to pursue a national political career. Lhoumeau by contrast, places his elevation later, after his return from Imperial captivity in December 1554. Being a gentilhomme de la chambre afforded the offices holder free access to the king. There were 62 such gentilhomme. This posting afforded him an income of 1,200 livres a year.

While Lanssac was being sent as the new ambassador, the Pope dispatched an agent named Federico Fantuzzi to treat with the Sienese. Arriving in Siena on 3 April he was well greeted. He extolled the virtues of peace to the magistrates of the city, and was promptly sent back to deal with the French representatives the maréchal de Thermes and cardinale d'Este. To the French representatives, the Pope's representative proposed a compromise, in return for the French soldiers departing Siena he assured them the Emperor would withdraw his soldiers from around Siena. Thermes and the cardinale thanked Fantuzzi for his peaceful inclinations, but inquired as to what guarantees there would be that the Emperor would withdraw in this proposal.

Strozzi, Lanssac and the Papal legates met in Ferrara in late April to discuss peace in Tuscany. Lanssac opined during this conference that the chief members of the fuorusciti should return to France so that negotiations with Julius could continue well. While in Ferrara, Lanssac crossed path with a representative the cardinale d'Este had dispatched to Henri to appraise him of the Papal proposal and seek instructions on how to proceed. Lanssac however declared that he had such instructions, and therefore he turned around Este's agent back to Siena. When Este learned of Lanssac's actions he was perturbed.

=== Ambassador to Roma ===
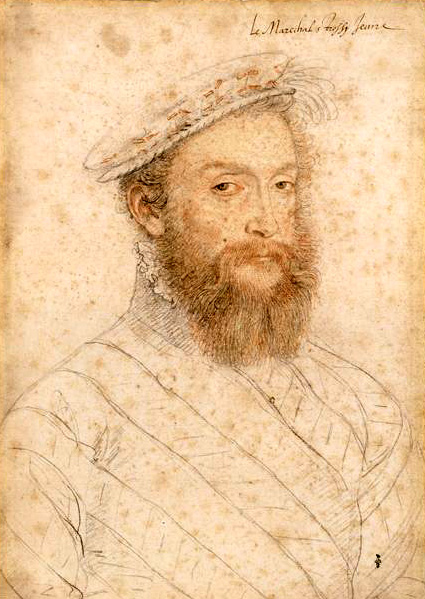
Piero Strozzi, established as a French maréchal in 1554 whose presence in Italy perturbed the Duke of Florence

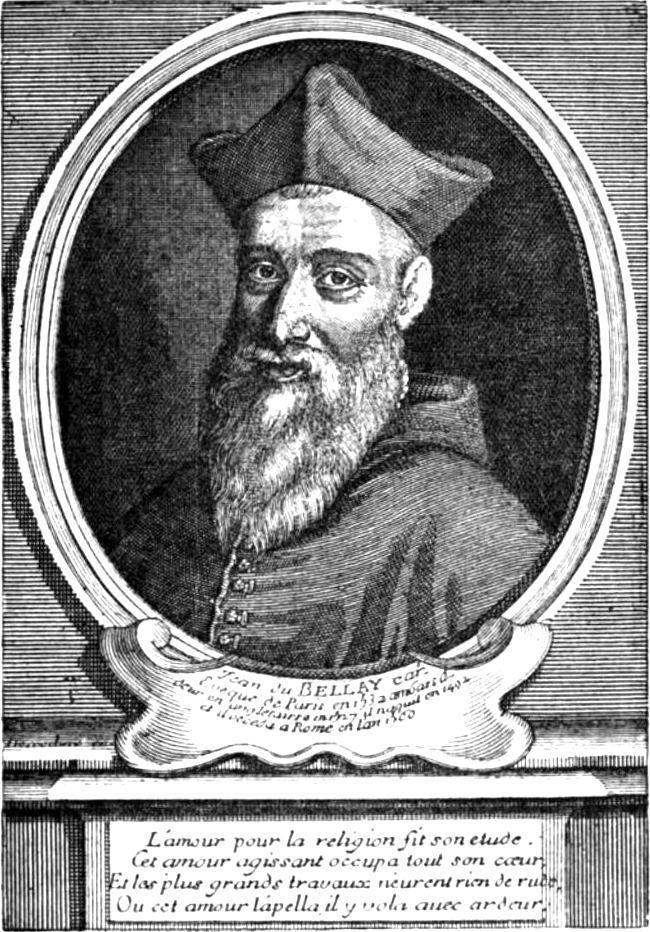
Cardinal Jean du Bellay who served as Lanssac's protector at the Papal court

Lanssac arrived in Rome to take up his charge on 30 April 1553 and was greeted warmly by the Pope. The Pope assured him of his desire to bring about a worthy conclusion to the troubles in Siena. The new ambassador took up residence in the palazzo Montegiordano, a possession of the cardinale d'Este. He was further greeted by a host of Sienese citizens that lived in Rome.

The position of ambassador to Rome was an expensive one for the ambassador. Over the course of his short residency, Lanssac spent 20,000 livres more than he received in incomes.

While the naturalised French fuorusciti Strozzi (sent into the peninsula at the request of Montmorency) worked to raise soldiers with money advanced by Henry, Lanssac and his protector the cardinal du Bellay attempted to convince the Pope not to back an Imperial invasion. With pressure being brought to bear by Lanssac and du Bellay the Pope declared his neutrality in the conflict.

On 6 May 1553, Lanssac wrote to the king, opining that all his agents and supporters in the region were disinclined to see a negotiated solution succeed and wanted a conflagration. Lanssac's patron, the duc de Montmorency, put out by the aggrandisements the Lorraine-Guise family were enjoying from the duc de Guise's triumphant defence of Metz allied himself with the belligerent policy of the fuorusciti as concerned Italian affairs. That same month, the Duke of Florence emerged from his concealed policy, driven into the open by Strozzi. He declared in a letter that he was dissatisfied by the French presence in Siena and he would not be moved on this point.

=== Viterbo conference ===
On 29 May the Pope declared to the cardinale d'Este his proposal for a settlement which would see the Papacy given the exclusive right to protect Siena's liberties. A few days later on 5 June the Pope arrived in Viterbo for a conference, he was joined by the French and Spanish ambassadors to the Papacy, and several cardinals. One of the cardinals who had travelled to Siena for the Pope explained the conclusion of his visit. Este had promised to come to Viterbo, but not as a minister of Henry, rather as an 'obedient cardinal'. A new representative was sent to bring Este to the meeting, and alongside securing his agreement, several Sienese representatives decided to meet with the Pope also. Lanssac wrote to hurry the cardinal du Bellay to rendezvous in Viterbo, however before du Bellay could join the ambassador (on 12 June) the Pope, feeling unwell, had already resolved to depart (9 June). During the talks that did take place, Lanssac complained about the behaviour of the Duke of Florence, arguing that he proffered military, monetary and moral support to the Imperial party. Shortly before his departure, the Pope had drawn up the main articles of his proposal: 1) a one-month truce during which French and Spanish forces both departed from the republic of Siena, 2) the sending of the cardinale di Santacroce to Siena to reconstitute the government of the republic 3) Siena would be taken under the protection of the Papacy. Lanssac expressed his disapproval for these articles which diverged from those provided by the legate of Ferrara.

The Pope may have departed from Viterbo, nevertheless those who had already resolved to join him there continued their journeys. This included Francisco de Toledo, the nephew of the Duke of Florence, who had been dispatched by the latter to represent Spanish interests. He arrived, along with the cardinale di Perugia on 11 June. On 15 June arrived the cardinale d'Este and the representatives from Siena. Este hurried off to where the Pope had taken up residence nearby (Bagnaia), while the Sienese representatives met with Lanssac. Having met with Lanssac, Este brought the Sienese to meet with Julius at Bagnaia, the meeting was a festive one, celebrated with feasts. Soon thereafter the Pope was called back to Rome.

The prospect of reaching some form of agreement was sunk by several factors. Firstly, the Sienese believed that only French protection would preserve their liberties (as the French king's power was too remote to impose a tyranny over them). There were also wider developments or perceived developments that were hostile to a settlement: it was reported (falsely) in Rome that the Holy Roman Emperor had died and that the duc de Guise was intending to leave France and descend into Italy in Siena's favour. Finally the Spaniards had just lifted their siege of Montalcino inside the republic. These various developments and rumoured developments emboldened the Sienese representatives to act assertively. Thus the Sienese had the confidence to assert their belief that only French protection was in their interest and the Pope's peace proposal died. Pope Julius was frustrated by this development. Du Bellay and Lanssac returned to Rome, meanwhile the Duke of Florence schemed ever more to see to the destruction of the Sienese republic which offered such a provocative example of alternative government to his own subjects.

=== Decline and fall of d'Este ===
Emboldened by his triumphs in Lorraine, Henri had committed himself to an aggressive posture in Italy by the summer of 1553. To this end he wrote to Lanssac and du Bellay on 30 July 1553. He dismissed the idea of abandoning Siena, arguing the protection had brought much benefit to the French crown. His ambassador and protector were to secure from the Pope not a negotiated settlement for Siena but rather an offensive alliance against the Emperor and Duke of Florence. Acting on this, Lanssac and du Bellay held out the benefits of French protection and a marriage for the Pope's nephew to Julius. Pope Julius responded that his office necessitated he take a neutral position on the conflict. He explained further that his nephew was already engaged to Lucrezia de' Medici, daughter of the Duke of Florence. Lanssac and du Bellay communicated the Pope's response to the court in such a fashion as to blame the cardinale d'Este (through mentioning the engagement of the cardinale's nephew to the Duke of Florence's oldest daughter Maria de' Medici).

The cardinale d'Este, little aware of the increasingly hostile reception his policy enjoyed at the French court maintained his connections to the Duke of Florence. Further complications were created by the fact that Este was very unpopular in Siena, where he still served as governor. Lanssac informed the cardinale that letters were being received in Rome which denounced his 'vexatious betrayals'. Lanssac's positive reputation with the Sienese ensured many of these letters complaining about Este's administration were addressed to him directly. The Florentine ambassador opined that some in Siena saw in the cardinale a similar character to that of the Spanish administration, or alternatively that he wished to impose himself on the administration of Sienese justice. Romier concludes that the greatest fear of the population was that Este would be less restrained in the use of powers granted to him by Henri than had been Lanssac and Thermes. As Este's position in Siena collapsed in August, the cardinale oversaw the arrest of several prominent Sienese men who had been involved in the overthrow of Spanish rule in the city. Lanssac wrote to Este deploring the situation, warning him to tread more carefully. The ambassador feared that if Este continued to provoke the Sienese the French could face a similar revolution as to that which had displaced the Spanish from the city. He informed the cardinale of the many complaints he received from Siena, including from people in the city Este did not believe to be hostile to him. Lanssac looked to the French court for a resolution (though he hoped to do so in such a way that would not turn the ire of the Lorraine-Guise family on him - Guise was married to Anne d'Este): he covertly asked the sécretaire Beauregard to alert Montmorency and sent a letter to the cardinal de Tournon. To Tournon he directly requested the relief of the cardinale d'Este. Despite this provocative act he offered reassurances that he was sure Este was doing what he could, but that there was no way he could satisfy the people. Aware of the explosive nature of this letter, he urged Tournon to keep it private.

Este was little interested in altering his behaviour, indirectly blaming the troubles in the city on a 'handful of bad apples riling the people up'. By October 1553 the situation in Siena was so dire, Lanssac (likely with Montmorency's encouragement) threw off his discretion in his warnings about the cardinale's position. His complaints, and those of du Bellay, achieved little however. The Sienese for their part had despaired of writing to Lanssac for relief, and instead wrote to the Pope to see them saved from the 'tyrant' that dominated them. The economic situation in the republic was also terrible. Lanssac and du Bellay could do little to make an impression on the cardinale. By September, Este had even lost the support of the royal French garrison of the city, including the duque de Soma who wrote complaints to the French court. Este would however receive a positive coup in his reputation with the French when he secured a marriage of his bastard daughter to the conti di Mirandola who was intimately tied to the French cause. However this was a temporary stay, and his position with Henri would become definitively compromised. It would only be due to the temporary eclipse of the connétable de Montmorency at court that he had remained in the French crown's good graces for so long. The cardinal de Lorraine, who was in charge of affairs in September and October was greatly desirous to protect the families ally and representative on the Italian peninsula.

From the Autumn of 1553, Lanssac, alongside the cardinal du Bellay worked to convince the Pope to extend the truce that had been agreed with the French in April 1552, that was due to expire in April 1554.

=== Strozzi ===
On 29 October 1553, the fuorusciti Strozzi was selected by Henri as his new representative in Siena and he departed from Marseille in November flush with cash and soldiers. In a letter of 6 November, Lanssac was informed of the replacement of the cardinale d'Este in Siena by Strozzi. Lanssac was concerned that the provocative choice of this leader of the fuorusciti could lead to war with the Duke of Florence. On 16 November, the ambassador, who still enjoyed the warm graces of the Sienese population was gifted eight barrels of the cities finest wine in the hopes that he would aid them in relief from their governor Este. Landing at Porto Ercole on 16 December, Strozzi hurried to Rome where he received a rapturous reception from the fuorusciti of the city, who thronged him and presented him with a medal. From 22 to 23 December, Strozzi was received by the Pope Strozzi worked to allay the fears his appointment provoked, particularly those of pope Julius. He further indicated to the Pope, Henri's desires to see a renewal of the truce with the French that du Bellay and Lanssac had been working towards. When he was not meeting with the Pope, Strozzi spent his in the Papal capital in conversations with Lanssac. Lanssac, working from Montmorency's instructions elucidated for Strozzi local affairs. The two men reached a very close understanding with one another. On 26 December, Strozzi departed from Rome with a band of fuorusciti, entering Siena with great honours on 2 January 1554.

Henri was aware a sensitive time had arrived for French policy as regarded Tuscany. Therefore, to aid du Bellay and Lanssac in their negotiations he ordered the cardinals de Tournon, d'Armagnac and de Lenoncourt to go to Rome to assist his representatives.

In November, Henri rewarded Lanssac for his services by elevating him to the position of capitaine de Blaye.

Lanssac admitted to the Pope that the appointment of Strozzi to the position of governor of Siena made it impossible for the Duke of Florence to countenance de-escalation. Henri had put him in a position where to do such would be to compromise his honour. Indeed, the Florentines and Spanish-Imperial forces first surprised the fortress of Camollia and then set to work putting Siena to siege. The military threat of the siege forced the cardinale d'Este to drop his continued assertions to total authority in Siena in favour of Strozzi. Henri remained indecisive on the place the two men were to enjoy concerning Siena, ill inclined to completely alienate any faction of his court. Thus he dispatched the bishop of Riez to defuse the tension between Strozzi and d'Este. Riez worked out a compromise by which d'Este remained senior over civil affairs in Siena but Strozzi would have complete autonomy as concerned matters of war. This was a triumph for Strozzi as the whole government of Siena was tied to military affairs at this moment. D'Este was put out by this, but limited himself to quiet displeasure. Riez wrote to the French court of his success at the end of February 1554. Lanssac joined the bishop in writing effusively on Riez's efforts as having been a great boon to the king's agents and friends in Siena and vexatious to the king's enemies. According to Lanssac the cause of the king's enemies displeasure was how well Riez had succeeded in his mandate.

As early as January 1554, the cardinale d'Este had been requesting relief from his charge. While it had at that time been a disingenuous request to bring pressure to bear on Henry in favour of confirming his position, the arrival of Riez transformed the request into a genuine one. On 26 February he sent away much of his family to Ferrara. Permission from the court granting relief was sent out on 4 March, arriving on 17 March. At this time, the cardinal du Bellay had been won over to the war party, and encouraged Henri to put the Duke of Florence in his place. Lanssac for his part had been driven along by the hawkish passions of the fuorusciti in the French government.

=== Renewal of the truce ===
After long negotiations a renewal of the truce between France and the Papal States was signed on 3 May 1554. At the Pope's request, the Emperor was excluded from discussion in the treaty, not wishing to impose a deal on him to which he was not a party. That same month Este made his departure from Siena. Embittered he decided against the return of the provisions the Sienese had afforded for his palazzo in the city, rather choosing to sell them off in auction. In a similar vein he demanded he be reimbursed for the sums he had forwarded Siena.

In June, Henri warned du Bellay and Lanssac of the imminent arrival of the cardinale di Farnese to Rome. He informed his representatives that it was Farnese's desire to see him reconciled with the Duke of Florence, as he was a friend of the duca.

With it having been determined that the Emperor and Duke of Florence were determined to see Siena reduced, Henri announced to Lanssac that he had raised 5,000,000 écus. Lanssac then aided in the preparations of the Sienese towns in terms of provisions, equipment, horses and personnel so that they might best resist any sieges. To facilitate the finance of the war, Lanssac enjoyed a busy correspondence with Dominique du Gabre the bishop of Lodève who served as trésorier (treasurer) to the French and allied forces gathered in Ferrara, de Selve the French ambassador to Venice and the Lyonnais banker Joseph Nasi. Lanssac took on the risky role of seeing the transfer of the money that was loaned to the French cause. The commander of Siena, Strozzi, requested Lanssac's presence in the city so that it could be in good hands during his absence on campaign. Lanssac liaised with du Bellay, and then departed for Siena on 12 June, arriving in the city on 13 June.

=== Marciano ===
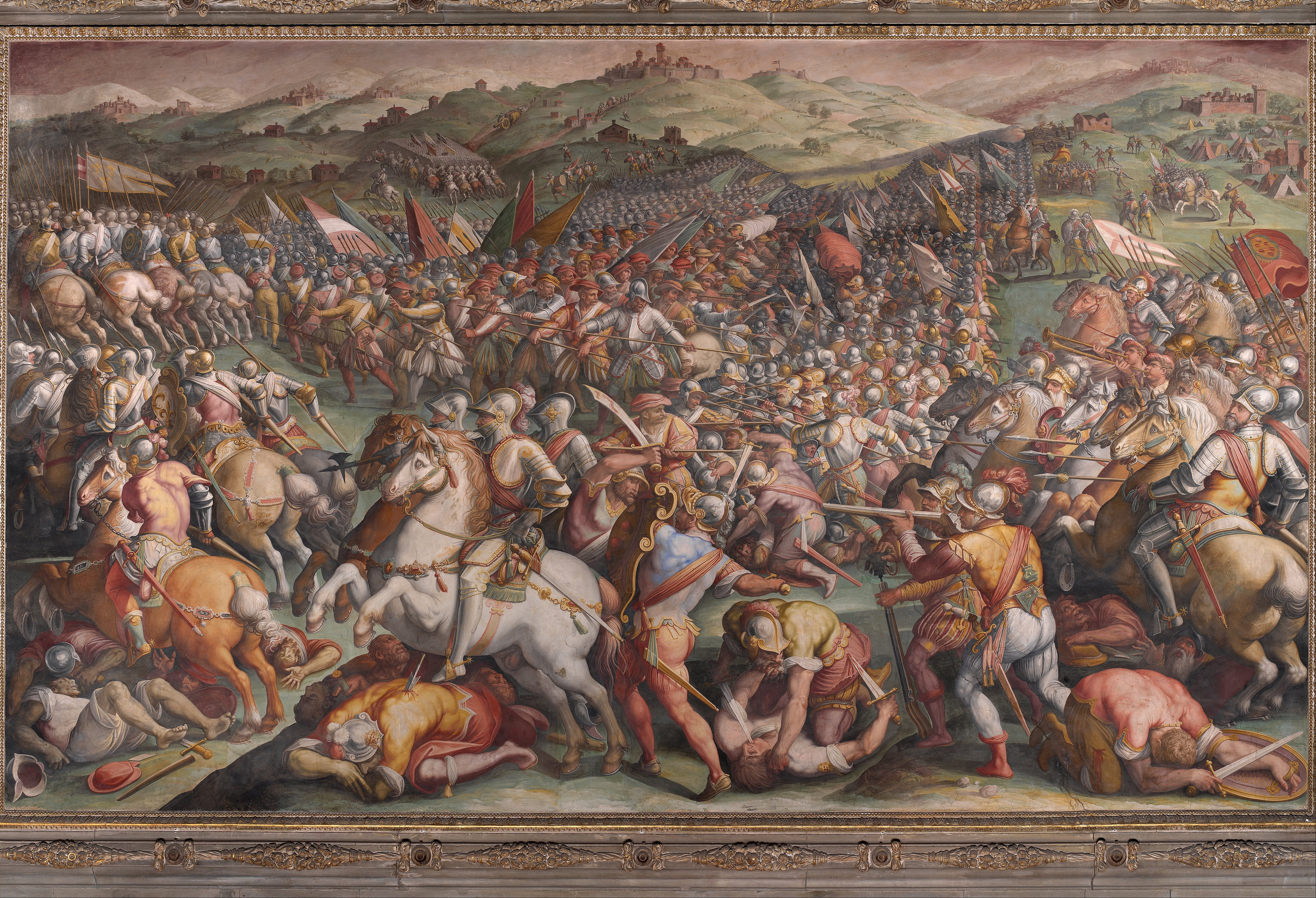
Disastrous battle of Marciano by which the French position in Siena was destroyed, and soon thereafter, Lanssac captured

The war fervour reached its peak in July when Strozzi and his forces invaded the territory of the Duke of Florence. Florence's regime was filled with discontent, and would soon throw him off to restore the republic, or so the fuorusciti believed. Indeed, at this time treasonous inscriptions were to be found in the streets of Florence. During the campaign, Strozzi's brother the priore di Capua (prior of Capua) was killed during the siege of a village near Piombino. When word reached Henri of this development on 20 July, he elevated Strozzi to the position of maréchal de France (marshal of France). Several days before his elevation, Strozzi held a council of war in Siena with Lanssac, the baron de Fourquevaux, the seigneur de Monluc, the conti di Mirandola and several others. The ambassador to Rome was needed back in the city of his charge, and thus he departed back to Rome on 17 July. In the present circumstances this war council constituted the government of Siena. Henri considering victory assured in Tuscany turned his eyes south towards Naples.

On 2 August 1554 Strozzi's army (supplemented by a force under Fourquevaux which had been force marched to save Strozzi's position in Siena) clashed with the Imperial army before Siena at Marciano. The battle was a catastrophe for the French with 4,000 left dead, and a further 2,000 made captives. Among the captives was Fourquevaux. Monluc, who had been left in charge of Siena was very sick at this time, and requested Lanssac come back to the city to lead the defence while he was convalescing. Lanssac indicated his acceptance of this charge to Strozzi on 30 July.

The battle offered the troubling spectre of the collapse of the French position in Italy. Strozzi, who had not been captured, held up in Montalcino. He was not able to assume leadership in Siena both due to the damage of defeat to his prestige and his injuries. In his absence, and the illness of the seigneur de Monluc, Lanssac was chosen to take at least temporary command of Siena. Having returned to Rome in late July he made his way to Montalcino to liaise with the injured maréchal de Strozzi. He then made his way forward to Siena, accompanied by 200 arquebusiers. Even with this protective company, he almost fell into an ambush on 7 August, and it was only barely that he was able to extricate himself. He subsequently made a new attempt to gain entry to Siena, this time disguised as a peasant at night with only a small group of followers, however he found himself surprised by forces of the duca di Florence shortly before he could enter Siena on 11 August. He was taken back to Florence where he was locked up like a common criminal in the fortress of San Miniato. His capture was a great satisfaction to the Duke of Florence, for his role in the revolution in Siena. His protector du Bellay protested in his favour without success. When word arrived in Siena of Lanssac's capture, Monluc was reinvigorated by the needs of the moment, he later opined that had Lanssac made it to Siena he would have died due to having no other purpose.

=== Prisoner ===
Monluc further opined that it was the hope of the Spanish that Fourquevaux and Lanssac's captivity would be a cause of discord for the French presence in the region, and force a more general withdrawal. Passions were inflamed at the thought of Lanssac's capture, and the (false) rumour that Strozzi had died. Indeed, at this time, the provision of supplies for the besieged in Siena were only secured for the city after pressure was brought to bare on the duca di Parma. Meanwhile, the French cardinals went back to the drawing board for who should lead the defence of Siena, deciding upon the maréchal de Strozzi's brother, Roberto Strozzi.

On 29 August 1554, de Selve, the French ambassador to Venice arrived in Rome, where he was to replace Lanssac. This temporary substitution for Lanssac necessitated the filling of the post of Venice in turn which was given to the bishop of Lodève. Despite his anger at how things had unfolded, Henri was open to the possibility of entering into a deal with the Duke of Florence. As he explained to the duca di Ferrara, this was a product of the fact that accord was the lesser evil given he could not provide the support to Siena the city needed quick enough.

Lanssac's captivity lasted until 14 November when he was exchanged for a captive of Strozzi's, della Corgna, the nephew of the Pope. This was despite the opposition of the Imperial party to the transfer. It would only be in August 1555 that Lanssac was discharged of his obligations towards the Duke of Florence (and della Corgna his obligations to Henry II). With few funds to his name, Lanssac made his way to Ferrara where he was provisioned for a return to France by the bishop of Lodève and provided with letters for Montmorency and Henri. He thus arrived back at the French court on 20 December, and was tasked only three days later with informing the ambassadors of the comte de Brissac's recent capture of Ivrea. The king also honoured him at this time by making him governor to two of his sons: his heir the dauphin (future king Francis II) and second oldest son the duc d'Orléans (future king Charles IX). He would remain governor to the young princes until the time of their respective accessions.

== Final Italian war ==
=== Paul IV ===
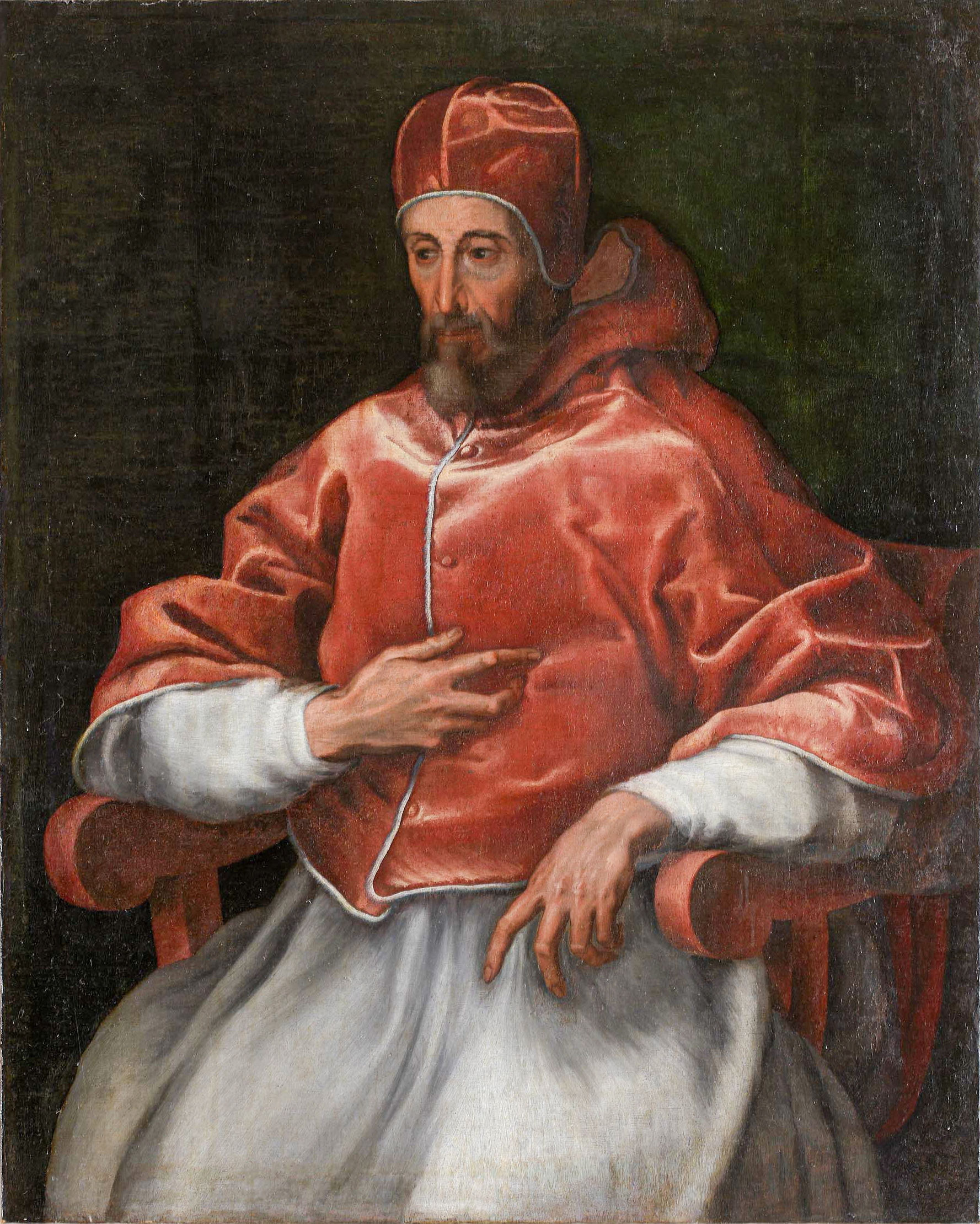
Paul IV who would serve as Pope from 1555 to 1559 after the brief pontificate of Marcellus II

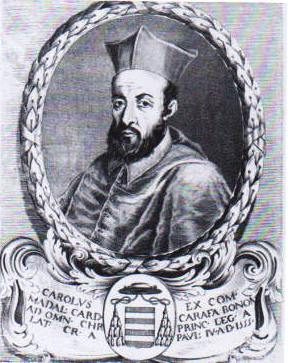
Pope Paul IV's nephew, the cardinale di Carafa

With the Pope dead, a conclave was to be held to elect his successor. Henri desired the electoral victory of either the archbishop of Cantebury or the archbishop of Naples. The regular ambassador of the French king in Rome, Avançon (who had succeeded de Selve to the charge in March 1555) was provided 25,000 écus towards this end. Meanwhile, Lanssac was made extraordinary ambassador for the conclave, and was tasked with preventing the selection of the bishop of Gubbio and to see to the selection of the archbishop of Canterbury (a task it was feared Avançon would struggle with alone). Despite these ambitions, the bishop of Gubbio would be elected Pope, and take the name Marcellus II. Lanssac left Rome with his election, his mission a failure.

He informed the archbishop of Canterbury of his electoral failure and then announced his desire to liaise with him and another English representative about England's position as regarded the Franco-Imperial war. Lanssac succeeded in convincing the English queen Mary that it was in her interest to be in accord with France. Thus a conference was held at Marck from 23 May 1555 to 7 June between representatives of both crowns and those of the Emperor on various territorial disputes, chief among which were the lands of Bourgogne, Savoia and Milan. Lanssac was not himself a French plenipotentiary - those roles went to his patron the connétable de Montmorency, the cardinal de Lorraine, the sécretaire d'État the baron de Châteauneuf, the bishop of Vannes and the bishop of Orléans. Nevertheless, he played a role in the negotiations, holding discussions with cardinal Pole on 18 May on Montmorency's behalf, and appraising the king of the progress of the discussions on 2 June. It proved to be that the respective claims of each side were irreconcilable, and the conference ended in failure.

Fortunately for Henry, Marcellus died only a few weeks into his pontificate, and on 23 May 1555 the archbishop of Naples was elected as Paul IV. His elevation was not unpleasant for the French court, and was celebrated by the Neapolitan fuorusciti (noble Neapolitan exiles), the Lorraine-Guise family also saw great advantage in Paul's elevation. To provide Henri's oath of obedience to the new Pontiff, the king dispatched Lanssac who was then at Saint-Germain as his extraordinary ambassador to the city again. He departed on 9 July, and was in Ferrara on 22 July where he provided a letter of Henri's to the duca. Before his departure, he was entrusted by Catherine with a letter in which she requested the elevation of the bishop of Saint-Papoul and the bishop of Béziers to the cardinalate. Finally he arrived in Rome at the end of July. His mission for Catherine would not be a success, and it would not be until 1557 that the bishop of Béziers became a cardinal.

The new Pope's nephew Cardinal Carlo Carafa proposed to Henri a plan for the French reconquest of Siena. Around Porto Ercole there were many exiles from Florence, Siena and Naples. At the French court, the duc de Guise felt it was important to bring the situation under control as soon as possible. Lanssac and Avançon were best placed to do this at this moment due to the difficult situation of the senior French clergy in the Italian peninsula.

Having arrived in Rome for the purpose of his extraordinary mission, Lanssac enjoyed an audience with the Pope. Paul informed him that he had sought to embody the role of his office through maintaining neutrality. He noted that this had not been possible due to the hostility of the Imperial party. The Pope noted that the Papal States were weak, and required French protection to preserve them. He suggested the allegiance of the Republic of Venice should be secured. Lanssac assured him of Henri's good favour towards the Holy See, and noted that it was a regrettable necessity that his sovereign had been 'forced to turn to the support of the Turk'.

=== Affair of the galleys ===
Lanssac was present for the affair of the galleys in August 1555. Around this time, the Carlo Sforza, thegran priore della Lombardia (grand prior of Lombardia) defected from French service to the Imperial cause. In revenge, Henri had his galleys sequestered and placed them with Niccolò Alamanni under the protection of the Pope. The gran priore would not allow this to stand and on 6 August 1555 his ships were seized from Papal protection at Civitavecchia by members of the Sforza family who took them to Naples via Gaeta, i.e. placing them under Imperial control. The Pope was furious at this insult to his temporal dignity and ordered the gran priore to return them to Papal waters within three days, something the ammiraglio (admiral) refused to consider. The gran priore's brother, the cardinale di Santa Fiora, alongside the Imperial ambassador spoke before the Pope in his favour. They condemned the Pope's position, and went as far as to threaten the Pontiff. This enraged pope Paul, who had the cardinale and some other members of the Imperial party arrested. Lanssac and Avançon arrived in the Vatican to ensure that Paul committed to the anti-Imperial path. They offered their solidarity to the Pope and congratulations to his nephew the cardinale di Carafa. They offered Paul, 100,000 écus to aid him in the destruction of his Imperial aligned subjects so that he might assert himself over the feudal lords of his territory.

To quickly secure the Pope for their party, the French immediately advanced him 50,000 écus. D'Avançon and the cardinal d'Armagnac looked to Venice for the provision of more royal funds to continue the effort. Meanwhile Lanssac undertook the corrupt practice of buying the loyalty of various cardinals to the French cause. The cardinale di Marsiglia to whom he offered 1,500 écus is supposed to have angrily retorted that he did not wish to be a 'slave' and that his loyalty was to the Papal curia. The money Lanssac, Avançon and Armagnac spread about had a positive effect for the strength of their party in Rome.

Lanssac departed Rome on 7 September and excitedly spread the news of what had transpired in Rome in Venice and Ferrara on his way back to France. In Venice he informed the republics government of Henri's intention to enter into a military alliance with the Papacy. He arrived back at the French court on 28 September. During his time in Italy, he had kept the French court appraised of the development of affairs by his despatches.

=== Truce or war ===
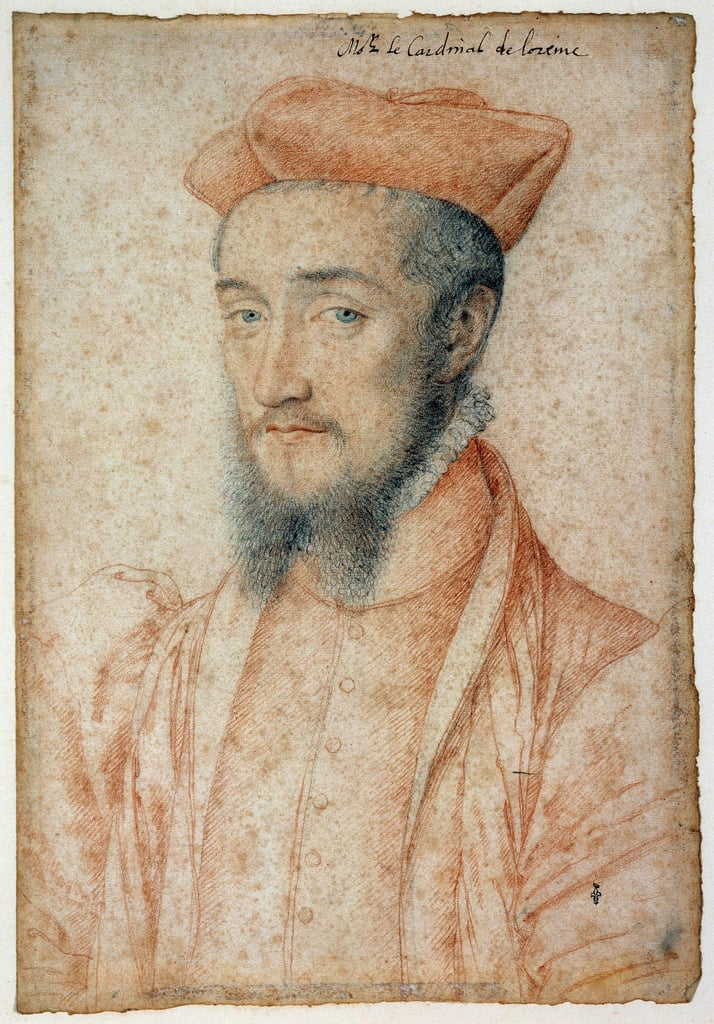
Cardinal de Lorraine one of the leaders of the war party at the French court who negotiated an offensive alliance with the Pope

The Pope was charmed by the offers he had received from the French representatives, and urged Henri to show his family the same good favour they had shown the Farnese family of Parma and the city of Siena. On 30 September, Henri tasked the cardinal de Lorraine with going to Rome to make a defensive and offensive alliance with the Holy See. At the same time, Lanssac who had just arrived back at the French court was tasked with going to Venice to win over the republic then travel onwards to Rome to announce the coming arrival of the cardinals (Lorraine and Tournon) and invest Avançon with full powers. Catherine again tasked him with securing the elevation of the bishop of Saint-Papoul to the cardinalte. Negotiations with the Pope would be conducted by the cardinals Lorraine, Tournon (and nominally Este) with the assistance of Avançon, Lanssac and the bishop of Orléans. Lorraine in particular was invested with total authority over the affairs of the French in Italy.

On 29 September 1555, Avançon met with the cardinale di Carafa, cardinale di Farnese and the duca di Parma in Rome. The conclusion of their discussion was that the duca di Parma would assume the position of king Henri's representative in Tuscany, that he would raise troops and as soon as was practical attempt to seize places on the border with Siena. Meanwhile, the duca di Urbino would menace the Neapolitan border with Papal troops. The duca di Parma however quickly got cold feet on the proposal as word of the arrangement leaked and its success became less assured. On 2 October the duca di Urbino arrived in Rome to tend his resignation as the Pope's capitano generale (captain-general). He was followed by his brother-in-law the duca di Parma, however he withdrew from the arrangement far more discreetly. On 3 November Lanssac and Avançon reproached him for his attitude, the diplomats arguing he was damaging not only the king of France but also the Pope by his behaviour. The French governor of Montalcino, who had been preparing for Parma's expedition piled onto the critique of Lanssac and Avançon.

Avançon had already significantly advanced the state of negotiations in Italy before the arrival of the French representatives. On 14 October he signed an agreement on the formation of a league with the Pope. This was 6 days before Lanssac would arrive in the city. By this agreement, in return for large subsidies from France, Paul promised to invest both the Duchy of Milan and Kingdom of Naples in the hands of sons of the French king Henri. The majority of the clauses concerned the southern project, due to the Carafa family (of which Paul was a member) being Neapolitan by origins.

When the remains of the son of the seigneur de Monluc, named Marc-Antoine were sent to Rome by his father for burial, Lanssac ensured they were buried with great honours. Le Roux compares the burial to that of a prince.

On 13 November 1555, Lorraine arrived in Ferrara. During the two days that he spent there he negotiated a league treaty between France and Ferrara. The cardinale d'Este served as the representative of his brother the Duke of Ferrara for the treaty. By its terms Ferrara was carved out an estate in the duchy of Milan of Cremona and its surrounds to a value of 50,000 écus. This flew in the face of the agreement Avançon had negotiated with the Pope.

Having become aware of what Lorraine had negotiated, the king was led by Montmorency towards hatred of his representatives actions. The sieur de Villandry was sent to reproach him on 6 December, in particular for what he had negotiated as regards Cremona which Henri felt prejudiced the rights of France to the duchy of Milan. Lorraine was caught off guard by this hostile reaction, he reasoned against the objections on several grounds to the crown: if the duca di Ferrara died Henri would be released from his obligations. He further argued for a scenario by which Ferrara would not receive the fortifications of Cremona. This provoked a new explosion of fury from Montmorency at the French court.

Lorraine arrived in Rome on 21 November, and was followed by Tournon on 22 November. Lanssac and the bishop of Orléans had already appraised Paul of the plans of the French cardinals though the Pope resolved to keep their arrival secret. Though he had derided Avançon's earlier negotiated treaty with the Pope, the treaty that Lorraine signed with the Pope on 15 December would substantively be the same agreement. Henri would be declared the defender of the Catholic religion and Papacy in return for protecting the latter, that the duc d'Orléans would enjoy sovereignty over Milan, Piemonte, and Savoia, that Naples and Sicilia would be united with France and that Florence, Siena and Pisa would be restored to independence with the Medici family driven from Tuscany. Henri would be expected to campaign into Italy with an army of 12,000, invading either Naples or Tuscany at the Pope's discretion, he would see the Spanish driven from the peninsula and that no separate peace agreements would be tolerated without mutual consent. Lorraine's about face in opinion on the agreement was likely the result of promises from the Pope in favour of the Lorraine-Guise family. For example, article VI of the treaty invested leadership of the league army in the prince who would come to Italy (i.e. the duc de Guise). The treaty agreed, Lanssac departed Rome on 18 December to take the terms back to France, arriving back at the French court with the treaty by the end of the year. By the time of Lanssac's return to the French court, the crowns' policy had swung against the hawkish policy of Lorraine. Montmorency had secured the pushing forward of his policy of seeking a truce with the Emperor. When Lorraine learned of this he was furious. However, Henri continued to flip in policy, and on 10 January authorised a courier to provide the ratification of Lorraine's treaty. Matters had swung again before Lorraine could arrive back in the French court, with the signing of the truce of Vaucelles to the delight of Montmorency.

In opposition to the truce of Vaucelles, the cardinale di Carafa boarded a boat to France. Henri tasked Lanssac with greeting the cardinale when he entered Lyon. Having returned to the court at Fontainebleau along with Carafa, Lanssac soothed a dispute between the cardinale and the representative of the Emperor at the French court. Carafa's mission was a success, despite Montmorency's efforts, Henri greatly tempted by the offers of the Papal party. Henri thus no longer put stock in the truce of Vaucelles.

During 1556, Lanssac was elected as the maire (mayor) of Bordeaux.

Henri explained to the Pope in a letter of 23 July 1556 that it was necessary before returning to a war footing to be assured of the support of the duca di Ferrara. When, soon after Henri received word that Ferrara had joined the defensive French alliance on the terms negotiated in November 1555, he gave permission on 11 August for maréchal de Strozzi, Avançon and Lanssac to enter into negotiations with Italian bankers for the receipt of loans. Strozzi and the seigneur de Monluc were further given tasks of military preparation to undertake. Meanwhile, as reward for his joining of the league, Ferrara was granted 100,000 écus, a pension and an array of soldiers.

=== Alba and the Roman crisis ===
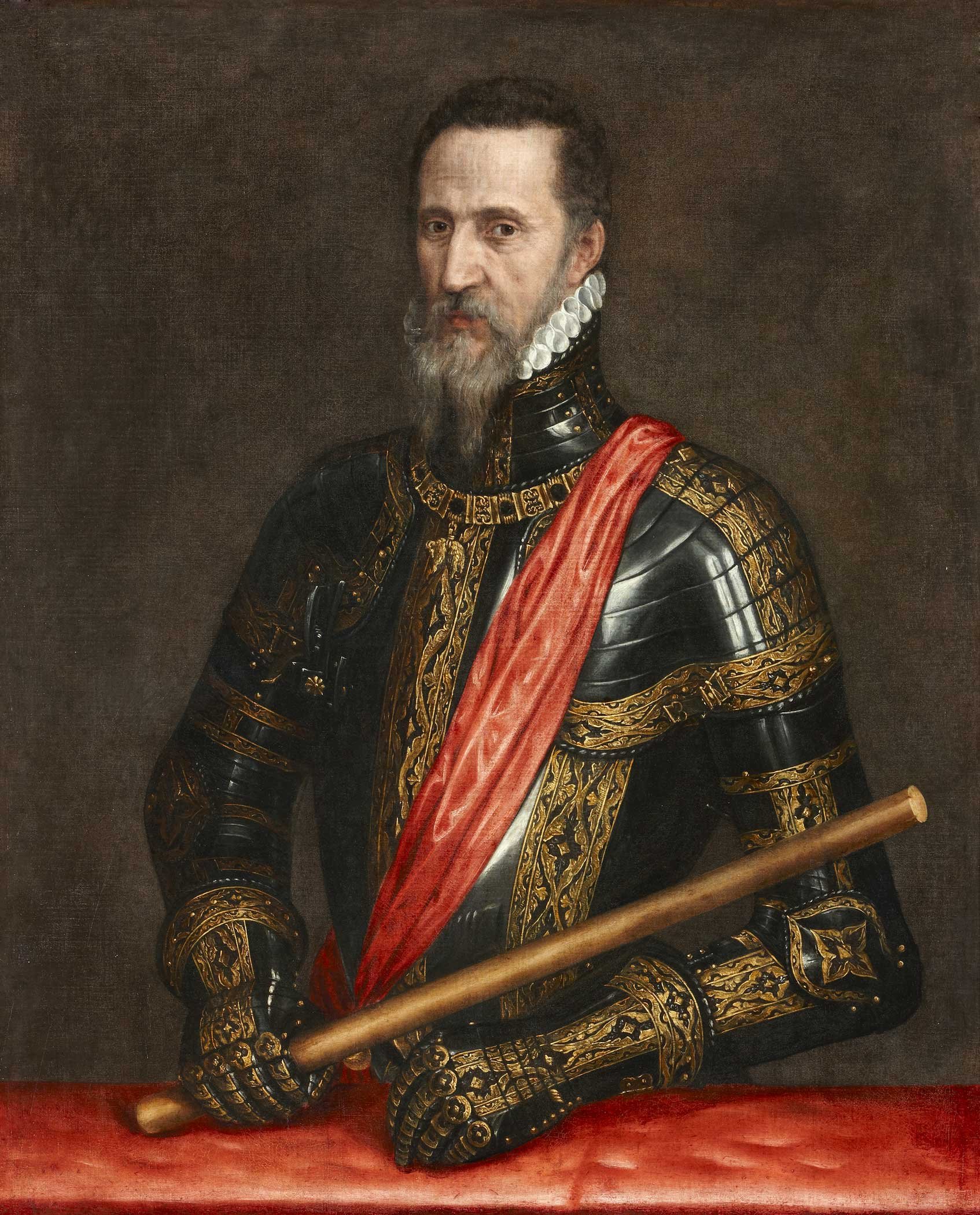
Duque de Alba (duke of Alba) who served as the virrey de Napoli (viceroy of Naples) in 1556 and invaded the Papal States

The truce of Vaucelles would not live out its intended duration. The Pope provoked the Spaniards to arms. War preparations were thus underway in the Autumn of 1556. On 1 September, the duque de Alba (duke of Alba), who was serving as the Spanish virrey de Napoli (viceroy of Naples) crossed the border with the Papal states at the head of a large army of around 13,500 men. He seized Pontecorvo without the need for fighting, and assumed control of various other positions. The Pope's nephew, the cardinale di Carafa, who had been in France made fast to hurry back to the Papal States. He embarked on a ship at Antibes on 5 September alongside Lanssac, the baron de La Garde, and the sickly maréchal de Strozzi. In addition to these commanders were 1,500 Gascon soldiers. Lanssac in particular had been charged by Henri with ensuring the military support he proffered to the Papacy at this dire moment was financially compensated. In return for providing seven Gascon ensigns to the Italian theatre (primarily for Montalcino and the Papal lands), Lanssac was to extract 350,000 écus in compensation. The party arrived in Rome on 7 September. While some of the French captains were intended for Tuscany, the military needs of the moment recommended their participation in the defence of Rome. Lanssac took charge of the area of the Roman walls from the Porta del Popolo (alternatively called the porta Flaminia) to the Porta Pinciana (with command of 1,000 Gascon soldiers) while other sections of the defence were put under the authority of the seigneur de Monluc, Strozzi, the Orsini and the cardinale di Carafa. Having taken Anagni, Alba advanced to cut Rome from Ostia. Strozzi, Carafa, Avançon and Lanssac held frequent conferences to discuss the defence of the city. Rome was engulfed in chaos, as such the French leaders, among them Lanssac, looked to the seigneur de Monluc to restore order. They hoped he could replicate the discipline he had inspired in Siena. Thus Strozzi and the cardinale di Carafa summoned the principal captains to the ambassadorial residence, where Monluc delivered a speech.

The marching orders from the connétable de Montmorency, who was then ascendant in French policy, was that the Pope make whatever concessions were required to get Alba to withdraw from his attack. For Avançon this was a difficult pill to swallow. Lanssac had only recently returned to Rome and therefore found pushing this policy a far simpler matter. The cardinale di Carafa was furious at the attempts to get a peace with Alba established, denouncing it as something prejudicial to both the Papal States and France. To aid the cause of peace, the French representatives in the city looked for support to the Farnese-Parma family and liaised with the duque de Alba's uncle the cardenal de Toledo (cardinal of Toledo). Du Bellay also became a champion of peace at Montmorency's instruction. When he had heard encouraging words in favour of peace from Alba he rushed to the Pope to try and sway him. This irritated Paul who forbade talk of peace with him. Thus du Bellay moved over to the residence of the Pope's nephew, the cardinale di Carafa and made the same case. Lanssac reported the deal to Montmorency as follows: Alba would withdraw from Papal territory and disarm in return for Papal disarmament and the handover of Imperial captives.

By the end of September, French policy had changed towards one in favour of war. Avançon was now faced with having to pull off an about face in policy again. The cardinale di Carafa, resolved to pursue peace with Alba regardless (something that was now regarded as a betrayal by the French), and due to the opposition of the Pope to his efforts conducted his negotiations secretly. From 24 to 28 November he met with Alba at the Isola Sacra. He was accompanied by the maréchal de Strozzi and the comte de Dammartin (maréchal de Montmorency from 1559 then duc de Montmorency from 1567) who were in Rome for an unrelated private business. A prior agreed 10 day truce, was extended to 40 days while a more permanent peace could be hammered out. In Rome, Lanssac and de Selve were outraged, only having learned of the initial truce after it went into effect. They decried that Carafa appeared to be in a position to betray the cause due to his contact with Alba and lack of communication with them. Their communications to the French court on this subject, and a related trouble where the Pope had forbidden French troops to enter Civitavecchia caused a weakening of the war party in the French court. Lanssac and de Selve despaired that they could not secure the goals they were intended to when negotiations were conducted to which they were not party. Guise dispatched his brother the duc d'Aumale back to the French court to determine whether new orders were required for him. However, Henri's wife queen Catherine, the maréchal de Saint-André and the king's mistress Diane held the line firm at the French court favour of war. They were aided by a letter arriving from Carafa which justified his conduct. Romier argues that the cardinale was driven to consider peace with Alba by the instability of the French position as regards the possibility of war. Carafa later explained his conduct at this time as working to stall Alba until such time as Henri could proffer his support.

=== Disgrace of Lanssac ===
Lanssac had frustrated the cardinale di Carafa, and in December he requested of Henri that he recall this ambassador, Henri complied to this request. In a letter from Venice on 26 December, Carafa explained that henceforth he had no desire to confide in Lanssac as he could not trust the ambassador and felt that Lanssac was poorly inclined towards him. It would be this letter that convinced Henri to recall Lanssac. He would not depart at the point of recall, unable to do so until financial matters with the Pope were settled on 5 February. Romier argues that the loss of Lanssac (and Avançon) from Rome represented the departure of the 'most distinguished' agents of Henri's policy in the peninsula.

After the forty day truce that Carafa negotiated had expired, both sides returned to fighting with enthusiasm. Lanssac was present for the driving out of the Spanish garrison from Ostia on 23 January 1557, and hurried to inform the Pope. Well aware of the Pope's hatred for the Spanish he joked to the Pontiff that he had spoken with an excommunicated people.

The duc de Guise was to be sent to Italy for the coming campaign and he departed Lyon to this effect on 20 December alongside the comte de Brissac. Meanwhile, the son of the connétable de Montmorency, the comte de Dammartin was in Rome petitioning the Pope to agree to an annulment of his secretly arranged marriage. Lanssac and the ordinary ambassador de Selve warned the king that the young noble wished to go to Civitavecchia to face off against the Spanish. Indeed, the comte de Dammartin would participate in the Papal recapture of Ostia in January 1557. This would not win him the annulment of his marriage, the college of cardinals ruling unfavourably, and leading to Henri to declare the marriage void by other means so that his illegitimate daughter Diane might marry the comte.

At the start of January, Guise was in Turin, where he established his plan of attack. Lanssac, who was in Rome sent him despatches about what he was up against for an invasion of Naples. Romier argues that the sending of Guise was a mistake for the campaign, as he was a simple man of war, who was naïve in non-military arts that were required for prospering in Italy. The historian contrasts him in this field with the cardinal de Tournon, bishop of Valence and Lanssac who had built the capacity to operate in a region where agreements were fickle.

In Rome, relations deteriorated between the French representatives and the cardinale di Carafa in the spring of 1557. De Selve entered dispute with the archbishop of Vienne. Meanwhile, Carafa fell out with the duque de Soma who favoured a quick attack into Naples, and Lanssac to whose intrigues he attributed the disappearance of his French secretary.

Yielding to Carafa's request, the cardinal de Lorraine oversaw the effecting of Lanssac's recall in February. The historian Romier argues this was a great loss at a time when his counsel would have been of great value, noting that his replacement was little experienced in Italian affairs. Lanssac departed Rome forlornly on 5 February.

=== Guise's campaign ===
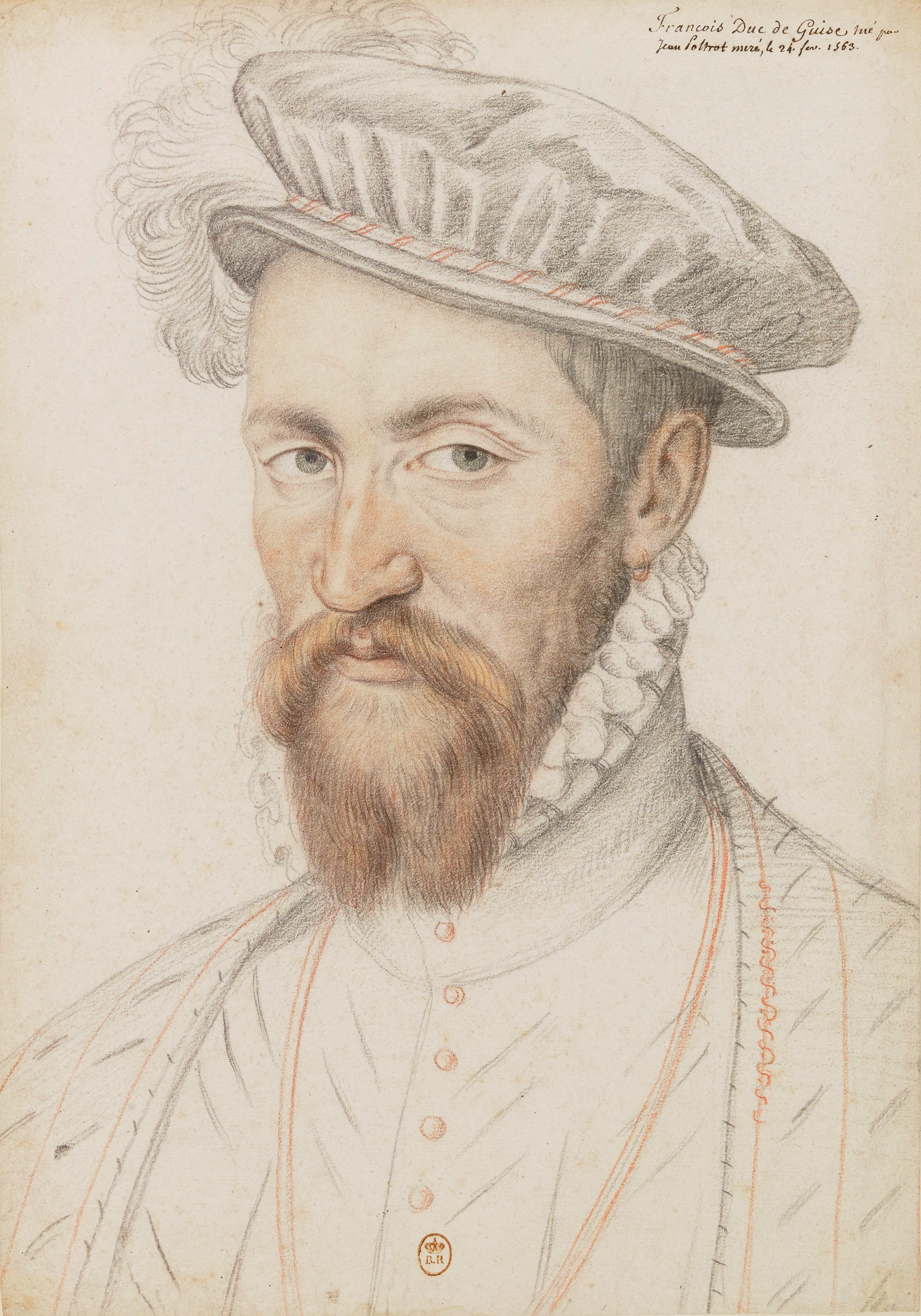
duc de Guise who led the French campaign into Italy in 1557 in alliance with the Pope

Guise hurried to Reggio Emilia in Italy for the meeting with the duca di Ferrara, his father-in-law which transpired from 13 to 16 February. For the conduct of this meeting with the French ally, Guise received the assistance of Lanssac who had been recalled from Rome with the cardinale di Carafa, and the archbishop of Vienne who had been sent by Henri to replace Lanssac. Both the archbishop and Lanssac came to the meeting with inopportune news. The duca di Ferrara hoped to secure from Guise a commitment for the conquest of Cremona, by which he could aggrandise his Italian territories. Neither Carafa nor Henri were favourable to this attack which would create hostilities with the Duke of Milan. For Carafa this attack would mean the departure of the French army back northwards. Ferrara made an alternate proposal for an attack against Parma, which was under the dominion of the Farnese duca di Parma. This was indeed what Guise had been ordered to undertake by Henri before his departure. However, on his way south he had observed the strong fortifications that had been placed throughout the ducato, and he was aware his army was not geared towards a campaign of sieges. Nevertheless, he trusted his father-in-law the duca di Ferrara to provide siege equipment and promised he would conquer Parma within 40 days. This proposal ran into strong opposition from cardinale di Carafa, who argued that this would be an act of aggression the Pope could not assent to. He proposed instead the original project of Guise seeing to the defence of the Papal States and then invading Naples. Guise then presented to the conference the prospect of undertaking an invasion of Tuscany. The Duke of Florence however ably convinced both the Papacy and the French court of his intention to join with the Franco-Papal league. Thus despite the enthusiasm of Guise and Carafa for the project it was quashed on orders from Henri and Rome. Only Naples was left as a prospect for Guise.

In the field, the duc de Guise found himself frustrated by Antonio Carafa (marchese di Montebello) who had been sent to pay his Italian soldiers. Guise waited impatiently for the Pope to provide the legitimation for an invasion of Naples, by investing the kingdom in the hands of a son of Henry II however Paul prevaricated on taking this step. In late May, Guise received orders from Henri to abandon a campaign against Naples and turn his attentions to Lombardia and Tuscany.

=== Saint-Quentin ===
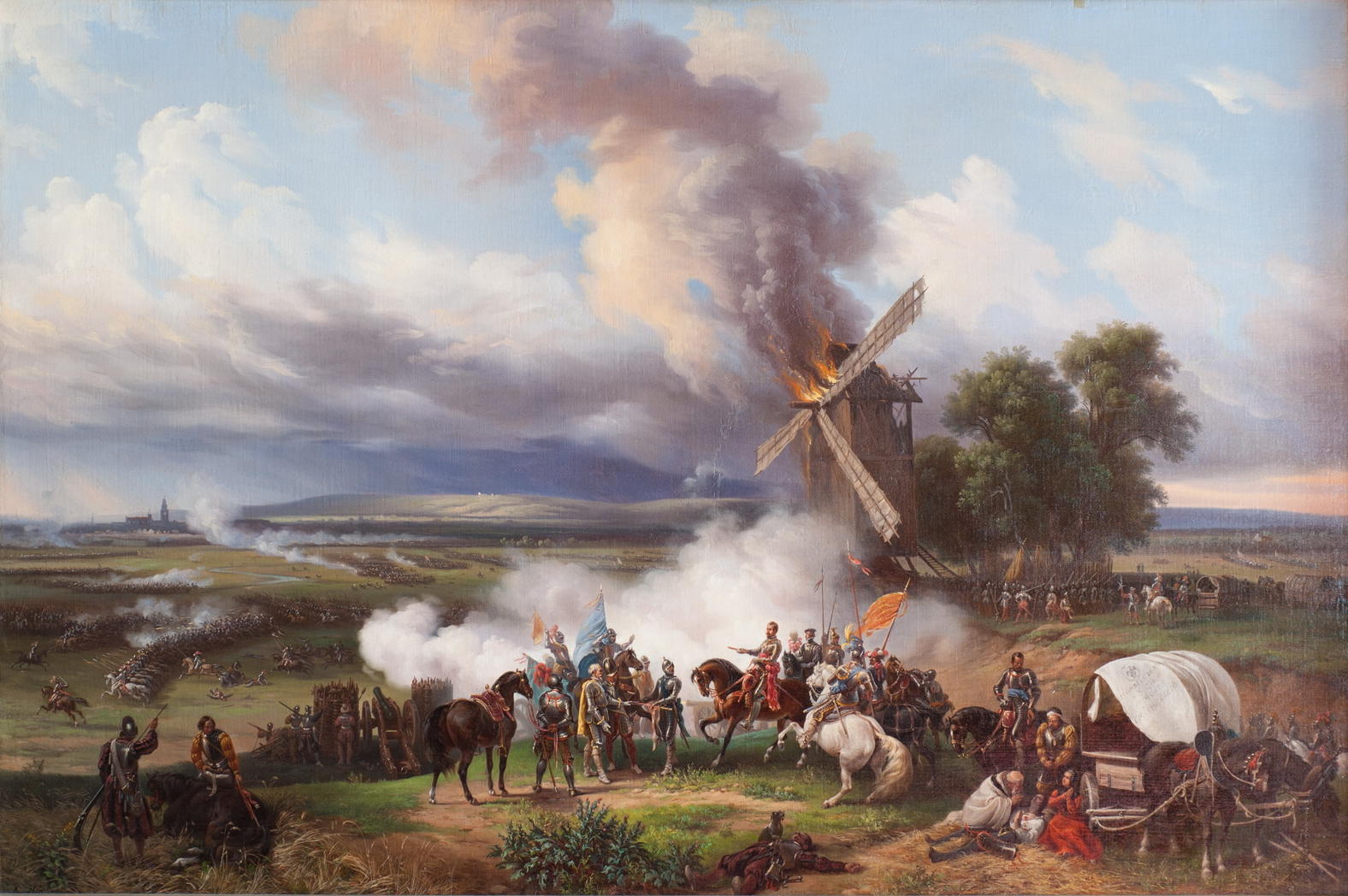
Disastrous battle of Saint-Quentin at which Lanssac was again made prisoner

Arriving back at the French court on 1 March, Lanssac offered a dismissive report on the Carafa. Soon after, Guise's complaints about the poor support he had received in his campaign arrived at the court. At the same time the war was heating up in Italy, war resumed between the French and Spanish in the Netherlands. With the cream of the French army absent in Italy, the connétable de Montmorency was left to face off with the duca di Savoy. Lanssac participated in the disastrous campaign of Montmorency in Picardie which culminated in the seismic defeat of the battle of Saint-Quentin. The French army was annihilated, with 600 nobles killed and another 300 taken captive, among them Lanssac's patron Montmorency, the duc de Longueville, the maréchal de Saint-André and Lanssac himself. Lanssac was first held at La Fère before being transferred to Péronne. At this time negotiations were undertaken over his ransom, which may have been set at a very low sum of 500 écus, an insignificant amount compared to the 500,000 écus total the Spanish made in ransom receipts from their triumph at Saint-Quentin.

Lanssac would remain in captivity until the treaty concerning prisoners had been established on 16 March 1558. While he did not participate in the duc de Guise's great triumph at the siege of Calais in 1558 which transpired during his captivity, he had the honour of guarding the newly won city upon his release, and was thus present in Calais in July 1558. In 1559, the Italian Wars would be brought to a close in the Peace of Cateau-Cambrésis.

In 1559 Lanssac still maintained the courtly position of gentilhomme de la chambre du roi that he had been granted in 1553. During this year the number of holders of this post were downscaled from 111 to 37 as a cost saving measure. Lanssac survived the curtailing due to being a client of Catherine's. By the 1560s the office of gentilhomme de la chambre was divided into quarters of the year, and its holders would only fulfil their function for 3 months a year, so they could be rotated.

== Young kings ==
=== Palace revolution ===
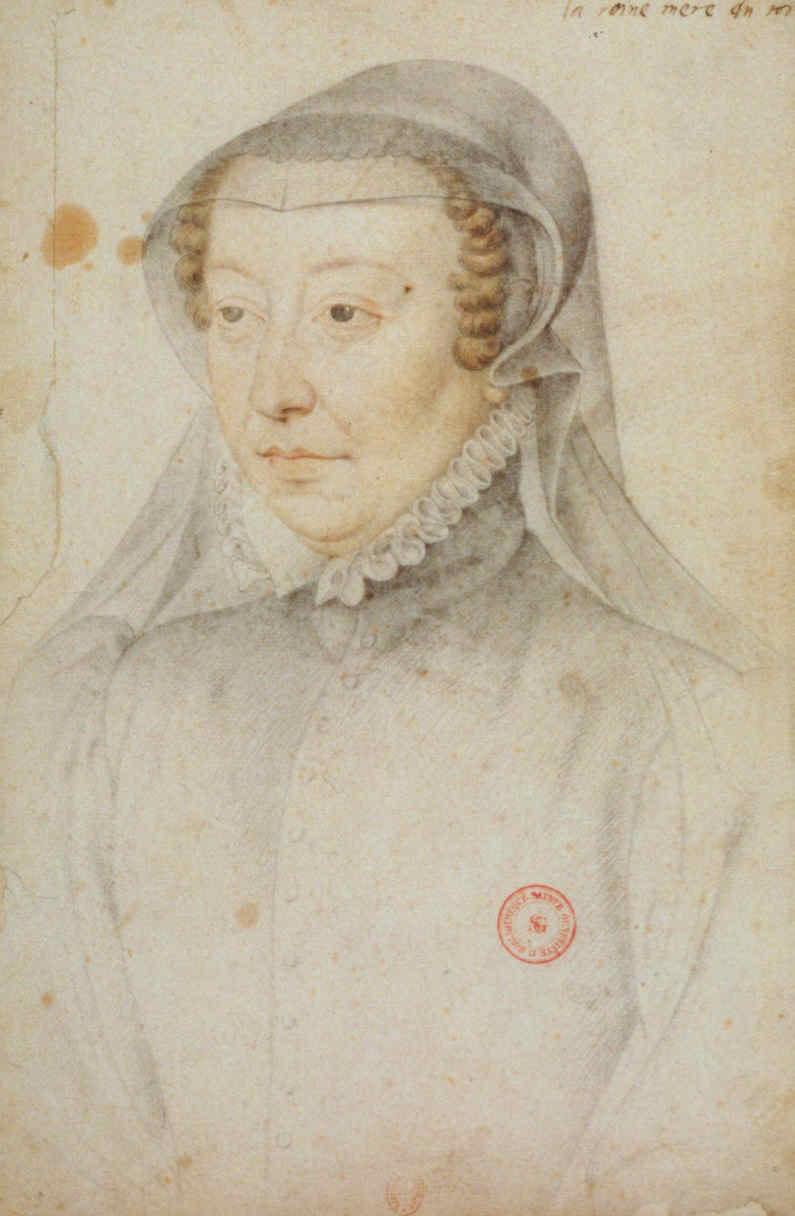
Catherine, wife to Henry II and mother to Francis II, Charles IX, Henry III. She would serve as the patron to Lanssac for the remainder of his life, affording him the senior position in her household from 1573

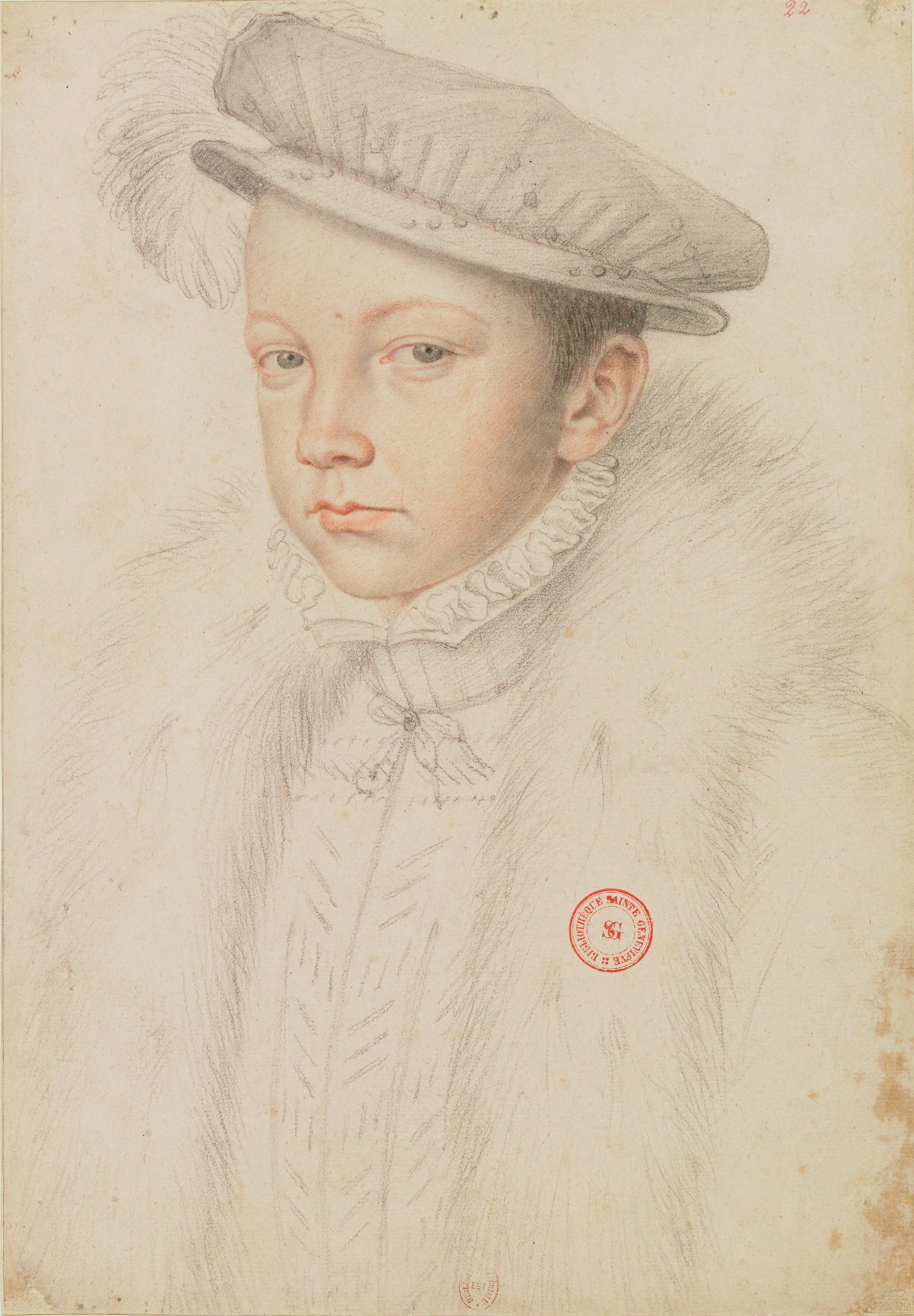
Francis II, who succeeded his father as king in 1559

Upon the death of Henry II, Francis II ascended to the throne, with his government led by the Lorraine-Guise brothers: the cardinal de Lorraine and duc de Guise. This new administration were ill-inclined to share their control of the government with the princes du sang (princes of the blood). To ward off the danger of these descendants of the royal line, the conseil privé (privy council) was expanded to around thirty figures so that the princes du sang could be drowned out. Among the conseillers would be the clients of the Lorraine-Guise family and the queen mother Catherine: the premier président of the chambre des comptes L'Hôpital (first president of the chamber of accounts), the bishop of Orléans, the archbishop of Vienne, the bishop of Amiens, the bishop of Valence, du Mortier, the diplomat Avançon and the seigneur de Lanssac. Lanssac received his induction into the conseil on 16 July. His inclusion came despite the fact his old patron, the connétable de Montmorency, was now in disgrace. By this time he already enjoyed great favour with Catherine however. Lhoumeau argues that she was already anticipating bestowing the offices in her household of chevalier d'honneur and surintendant des finances (knight of honour and superintendent of the finances) on him.

Cloulas argues this conseil was a polite fiction, only meeting once properly during the reign of Francis II (for the Assembly of Notables in August 1560), while real business was conducted by the Lorraine-Guise administration elsewhere. Nevertheless, membership of the conseil privé brought with it an income of 2,000 livres, and the privilege of being allowed to be present during the king's levée (the rising of the king in the morning).

=== Élisabeth's mission ===
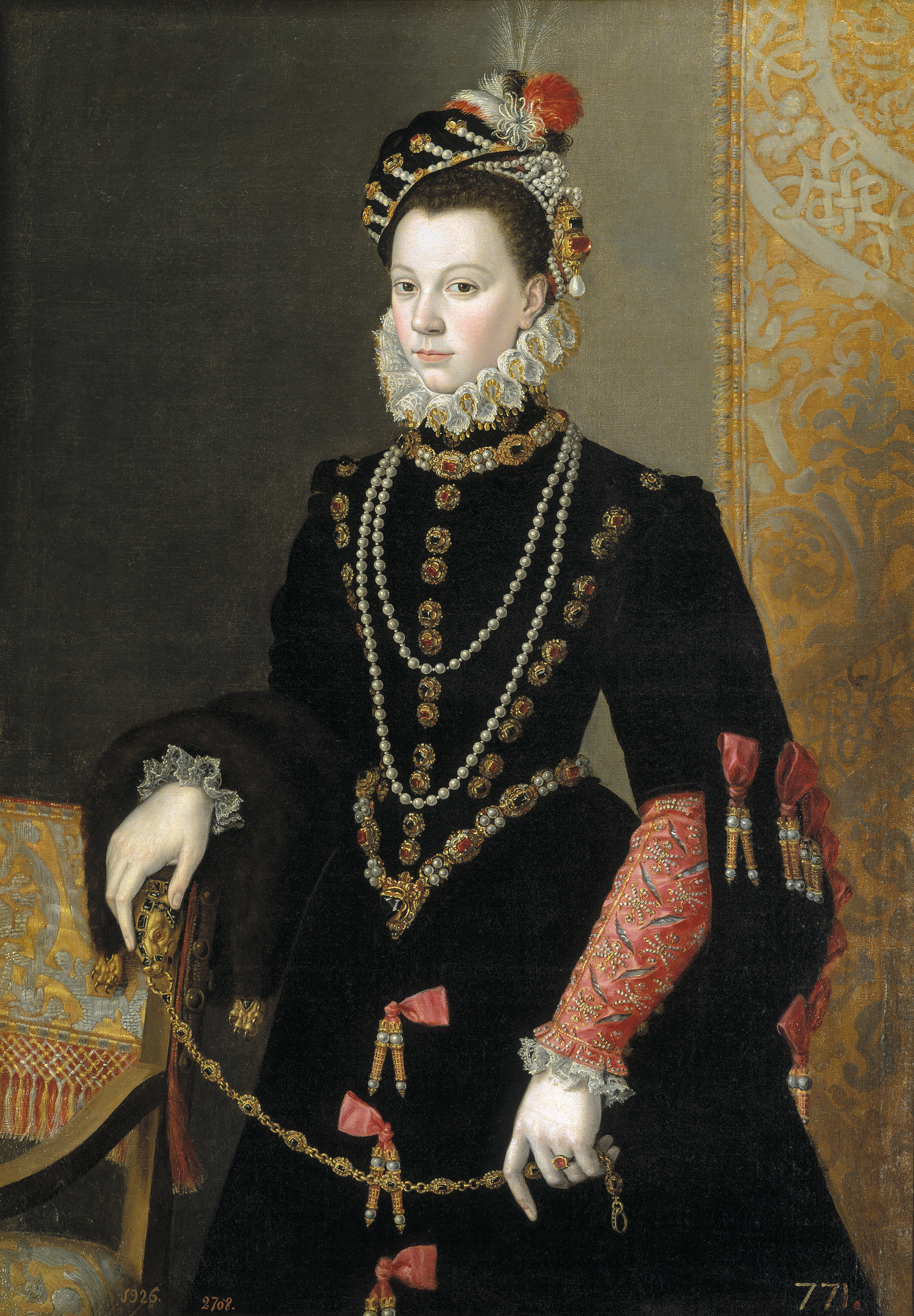
Élisabeth, married to the Spanish king Philip II by the terms of the Peace of Cateau-Cambrésis.

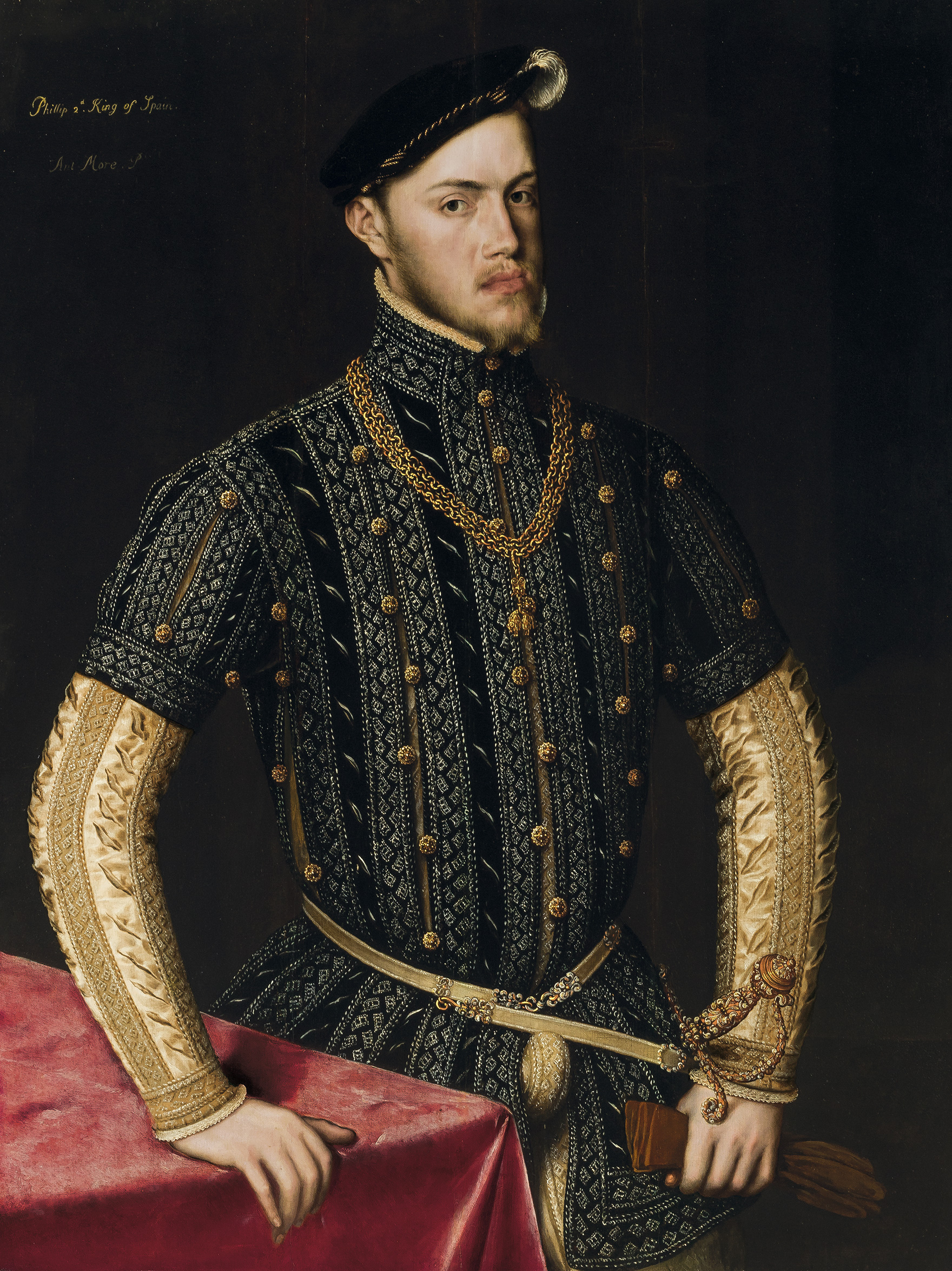
Philip II, the king of Spain

Lanssac participated in the journey out of the French kingdom undertaken by the king's sister Élisabeth so that she might be united with her new Spanish husband king Philip. This marriage was one of the terms of the peace of Cateau-Cambrésis. Up to the Spanish border Élisabeth was also accompanied by the king of Navarre and his cousin the prince de La Roche-sur-Yon. In the kingdom of Navarre, on the way to Pamplona, a dispute arose among Élisabeth's entourage that Lanssac reported back to the French court. Lanssac travelled out ahead of the royal party, and on 6 December announced to the cardinal de Lorraine the arrival of the duque del Infantado (duke of Infantado) in Pamplona. He was delighted by the reception he was granted by the duque and the cardenal de Burgos. He would reunite with the king of Navarre in Pau before the month was out. The handover of Élisabeth to Spanish protection was undertaken in an elaborate ceremony at the abbey of Roncesvalles. Here, Burgos and Infantado who served as the Spanish plenipotentiaries, along with other senior Spanish nobles, joined with the party. Élisabeth wept at the ceremony, but was comforted and reassured by Lanssac. With this ceremony over, the journey into Spain continued.

United with her in a foreign kingdom by January 1560, Lanssac then played a leading role in helping her adjust to the customs of the Spanish court alongside the French ambassador in the country the bishop of Limoges. He would stay by her side for the next four months. His familiarity with the Spanish language allowed him to serve as a translator. The extraordinary ambassador (as Lanssac technically was) informed the cardinal de Lorraine of the great joy the Spaniards expressed at the presence of Élisabeth. Lanssac reported to the young queen's mother in March about the discontent of Élisabeth's French servants who had been dismissed in favour of Spanish servants.

During April both Lanssac and the bishop of Limoges worked hard towards the securing of the towns as dower that had been granted to the late empress Isabel (who had died in 1539). They received assurances the revenues of the towns in question would be secured for Élisabeth for the next two years. The ambassadors further argued that given the cost of living was now much greater than it had been in the time of Isabel, that Élisabeth's income be increased up to a value of 100,000 écus. They also pressed Philip on several other financial points on Élisabeth's behalf. The two men had extraordinary success, with Philip conceding to all their demands. The bishop of Limoges richly praised Lanssac highly in his diplomatic despatches to Catherine and the king Francis. He argued Lanssac had shown himself to be a man of great virtues and honour, who had devoted not only his body but his personal finances to the service of Élisabeth. Due to the delays in these negotiations, it would not be until 16 May that Lanssac took his leave of Spain and departed back to France.

=== Security of the south-west ===
On his return, there was talk of sending Lanssac out for a new mission in England. However, in the wake of the Conjuration d'Amboise (conspiracy of Amboise) in March 1560, Guyenne was cast into a state of disorder. The king, Francis was aware of the authority Lanssac enjoyed in Bordeaux. Thus he charged the diplomat with travelling across Aunis, Saintonge the Blayais and Bordeaux to assess how dire the situation was and to provide a letter of warning to the parlement of Bordeaux about the prospect of a sedition against the city.

In Bordeaux, Lanssac was afforded the honour of being allowed to keep his sword on his person. He instead provided it to the parlementaire président Roffignac who assured him of the bodies readiness to devote their lives to Francis' service. Having delivered the letters in his possession to the various great seigneurs of Guyenne, he reported back to Francis on 11 September that security measures had been put in place with the agreement of the lieutenant-general of Guyenne the seigneur de Burie and the governor of Bordeaux the comte de Noailles for the preservation of the two châteaux of Bordeaux, Hâ and Trompette. As a result of the increases in the guard and repair works he assured the crown there was no safer city in the kingdom than Bordeaux. Due to these precautions, the disorders that plagued the Agenais, Périgord and Bazadais did not trouble Bordeaux. Lanssac then returned to the French court. Noailles waxed lyrically about his mission to the French court, wishing that there could be many Lanssac's due to his dexterous efforts. He also wrote to the duc de Guise, assuring him Lanssac's mission had meant there was no need to expand the garrison of Bordeaux.

In the inductions into the Ordre de Saint-Michel (Order of Saint-Michel) (the highest order of French chivalry) undertaken by the Lorraine-Guise administration on 29 September 1560, eighteen new chevaliers (knights) were created. Many nobles who were close to the Lorraine family received the prestigious honour. In addition to their own men, some elevations were made through consultation with the queen mother Catherine. By this means the seigneur de Sipierre, governor of the king's brothers; Nicolas d'Anjou-Mézières; and the seigneur de Lanssac who by this point was an intimate advisor to Catherine, were made chevaliers.

=== Catherine's government ===
On 5 December 1560, the king Francis II died at the age of 16 after an agonising illness. Sometime before the death of Francis, Lanssac was entrusted by Catherine with heading out to deliver a letter to the disgraced connétable de Montmorency, concerning the composition of the coming regency government for her next eldest son the young duc d'Orléans (who became king Charles IX.

Lanssac had a role to play in the modest funeral accorded to the dead king, accompanying the remains alongside the seigneur de La Brosse and the bishop of Senlis to the Cathédrale Sainte-Croix d'Orléans. Here, they were entombed on 17 December.

As an advisor to Catherine, he played the role of an intermediary between her, the duchesse de Montpensier and the court of the king of Navarre in the negotiations that saw the king of Navarre accept the title of lieutenant-généraux du royaume (lieutenant-general of the kingdom) and cede the position of regent for the young king, which he enjoyed the rights for, to Catherine. Lanssac's conduct in these negotiations was very skilful according to Lhoumeau.

In his correspondence, it would be to Catherine that he signed off his letters with the greatest deference, even more so than those to the king. He would function in her household as the intermediary through which those who wished to secure favour from the queen mother would have to pass.

Catherine dispatched Lanssac to Guyenne in February 1561 to see to the defence of the province. He spent a brief time in Bordeaux to this end, where he was to liaise with the lieutenant-general Burie and the seigneur de Duras on military matters. His stay in the area would be very brief, as he had returned to involve himself in discussions of the edict of pacification by 19 March. For the purpose of seeing the edict enforced he was twice sent to remonstrate with the Paris parlement to chide the court for overstepping the proper boundaries of its authority.

=== Mission to Roma ===
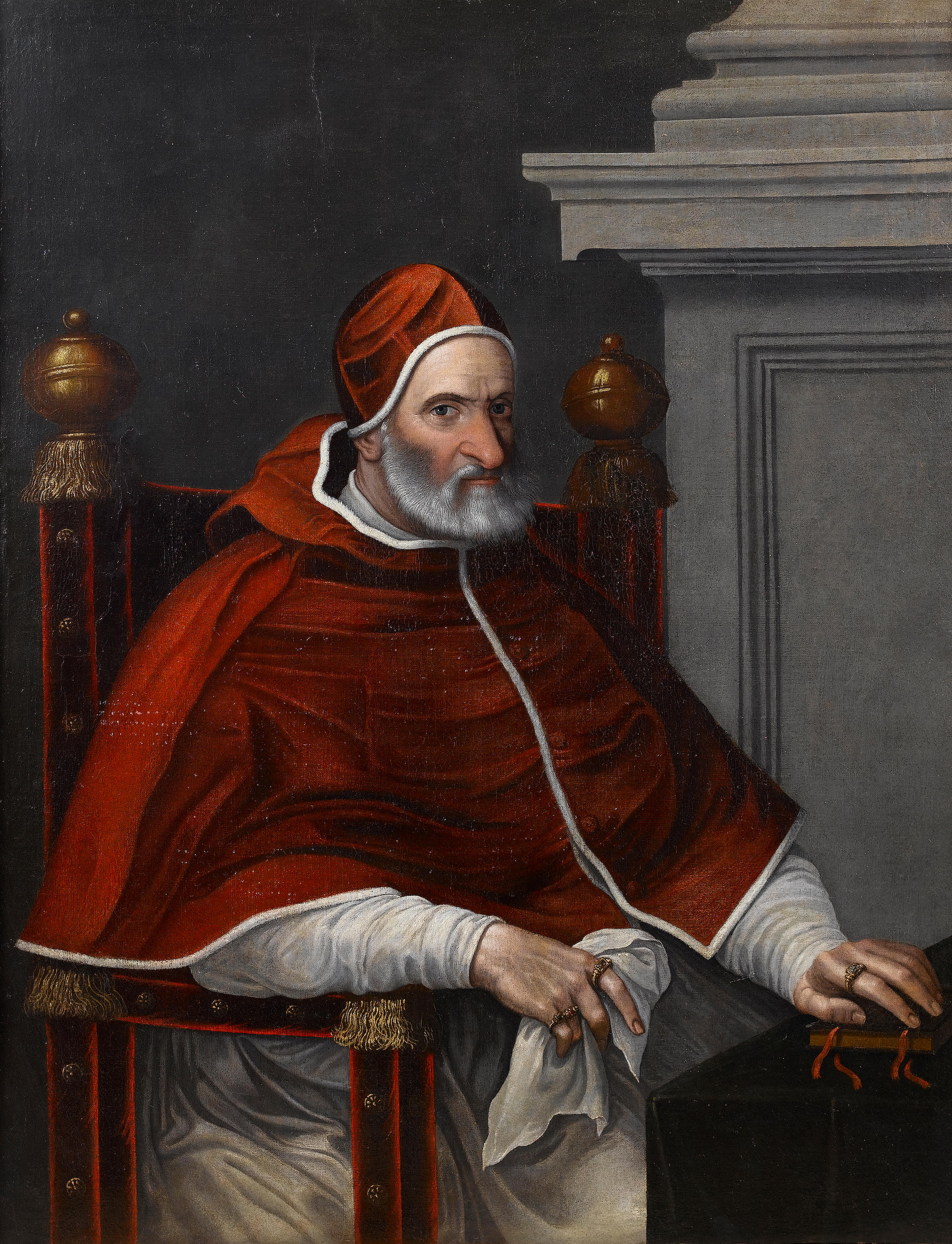
Pius IV, Pope from 1560 to 1565 who oversaw the Council of Trento

Over the winter of 1561–1562 Lanssac was sent to undertake an extraordinary diplomatic mission in Rome, a city in which he enjoyed diplomatic experience from the 1550s. He was to reassure the Pope about the recent Colloquy of Poissy which had aroused Papal distress, and discuss further matters. Lanssac would depart sometime after 28 January 1562 for the mission. On route to the Papal court, Lanssac was to stop over at the Savoyard court, to congratulate the duchessa di Savoia on the recent birth of a son. Lhoumeau speculates that while with the duca di Savoia, Lanssac would have discussed with him the restitution of the remaining French held positions in Piemonte (Turin, Chieri, Chivasso and Villanova d'Asti). While at the Papal court, Lanssac offered a defence to the Pontiff of the crown's new Edict of Saint-Germain-en-Laye, and was, according to Catherine, successful in seeing the Pope not be wholly set against it. In March, the Pope would quiz Lanssac on the matter of these remaining French possessions in Piemonte. Lanssac assured him, a resolution would be reached on the matter. Indeed, by July, Lanssac was able to report to the bishop of Rennes that the territories had been returned to the duca di Savoia, while the French king remained in possession of Pignerol and Savigliano and the marchesato di Saluzzo (marquisate of Saluzzo).

With the outbreak of hostilities between the crown and their Protestant rebels in April 1562, Lanssac also had a responsibility to see the Pope grant financial concessions to France, in particular support in raising a large loan for the crown to aid it in fighting Protestantism, and an endorsement of an alienation of 100,000 écus worth of ecclesiastical property in France. The Pope may have indicated to Lanssac that he would be willing to devote a million écus d'or (gold crowns) to support the royalist-Catholic cause in France. Lanssac reported by encrypted communications that the Pope was open to seeing church land alienated, in return for religious commitments from the French crown, and French participation in the upcoming church council. On his return to France, Lanssac presented a very favourable picture of the fruits of his negotiations to Catherine, going beyond what he had actually secured. Catherine would instead request of the Papacy that they act as a guarantor for a loan of 200,000 écus. In May the Pope would agree to donate 100,000 écus to the French crown, while a further 100,000 écus would be loaned.

=== Council of Trento ===
Lanssac would serve as the leader of the French ambassadorial mission at the church Council of Trento at the instigation of the queen mother Catherine. The bishop of Aire had been considered for the role of mission leader, but this was rejected by Catherine and the duc de Guise, both considered him to be too ultra-montane, and instead favoured the choice of a non-prelate. Lanssac was little keen to take up the role, but was granted a sum of 12,000 livres by Catherine to convince him. Supporting him would be the seigneur de Pibrac and du Ferrier. Both of these men were suspected by some of being favourable to Protestantism, but the fears of the cardinale d'Este on this count were allayed by the fact that Lanssac was leading the mission. Though the presence of Lanssac eased his fears, according to Thompson, one of Lanssac's purposes at the council was to prevent the formation of a Catholic league. The cardinal de Lorraine would later be established as one of the French ambassadors in November 1562. The third session of this long running church council had opened on 18 January 1562. Lanssac endeavoured to either see the postponement of the sessions or race to Trento, so that he might be present before the council had begun its deliberations. This was unsuccessful, and realising that he could not arrive before deliberations began, he therefore tarried in Lyon. Here, he tried to beseech the governor of the city the comte de Sault to grant the Protestants the right to worship in a place within the city. He had the leading Protestants and Catholics of Lyon embrace, but a few days later the city was taken by a Protestant coup. Moving on, he stopped by the duca di Savoia, and continued the discussion of the restitution of French held places in Piemonte with Savoia.

Lanssac arrived in Trento on 18 May, and was followed by his two colleagues three days later. He bemoaned to the French ambassador in Rome on the day after his arrival that the French would gain little at this council if the Pope did not afford time for the absent prelates and French prelates to arrive. The diplomats presented their credentials on 26 May 1562. They informed the French bishops who were present at the council to consult with them as needed. With their arrival they announced their priorities for the council. They were to end the improper use of wealth in the church and see to the clergy engaging in their proper duties. While serving as ambassador to the council, Lanssac received 15 letters from Catherine. The despatches Lanssac received during his service at Trento were among the longest Catherine produced for her diplomats of the period, averaging almost 750 words each. Gellard connects the length of the correspondence sent by Catherine to the importance she placed on the mission. Lanssac attempted to use the familial connection between the member of the French court Louis de Gonzague and his uncle cardinale di Gonzaga who held the presidency of the council of Trento, to gain more accommodations for France.

The French delegation would find themselves in disagreement with the Spanish delegation at Trento over their relative precedence with the Pope. This dispute did not immediately emerge on their arrival as had been feared, due to the absence of the Spanish ambassador on the day of Lanssac's arrival. Nevertheless, the French king's representative would enjoy precedence over the Spanish king's representative, much to the outrage of the latter. Lanssac hotly defended the status quo of French precedence, citing the various aids the French had rendered to the Pope over the years. To question this 'ancient honour' was an outrage for all the French ambassadors. He made it clear that if this privilege was innovated on, he and all the French prelates would depart from Trento. He later received instructions that made it clear he was only to act on this threat after having received the express order, so that it could be clear it was the Pope's innovations that had sunk the council of Trento and not king Charles' doing. This position of Lanssac's was challenged by the Spanish representative on the ground of their particular devotion to the Catholic faith. The Spanish ambassador vowed to only make himself present when the French ambassador was absent so that he would not have to be subordinated to him. For the feast of Saint-Peter, Lanssac became aware that the French and Spanish were to be treated as were they of equal precedence he rose indignantly and was followed by the French prelates. The cardinal de Lorraine spoke out against the innovation. It would be resolved not to present the incense to anyone to avoid being seen to favour either the French or Spanish ambassador by presenting it to one of them first. The dispute would ruminate for many more years, still actively causing disagreement in 1588 during the baron de Saint-Gouard's embassy in Rome. The contemporary author Brantôme praises Lanssac's firmness on the matter of precedence, and attributes it to his military background, arguing that a diplomat of the church or judiciary would not have been as effective as Lanssac.

The Pope opined that Lanssac acted more as an ambassador for French Protestantism than as an ambassador for the French crown during his time at Trento. Lanssac hotly debated this, writing to the Pope indignantly on 8 June, and encouraging the French ambassador in Rome to intervene on his behalf. As a result of these attacks on him, Lanssac begged Catherine to relieve him of the charge on 7 June. The Pope would not long be in this sour mood once he learned that the arrival of the French prelates to Trento was to be accelerated. Lanssac again requested relief on 29 July and then once more on 14 August. These requests were refused by Charles who expressed his satisfaction in the work Lanssac was doing at Trento. With the French prelates who were on their way due to represent a large delegation, led by the cardinal de Lorraine, Lanssac scrambled to fulfil the 'tedious' task of securing appropriate accommodation for them. This was made more challenging by the small size of Trento and the lateness of their arrival. Learning that the cardinal de Lorraine was close to Trento, Lanssac travelled to accompany him for the final stretch to the city. Lorraine's arrival greatly reduced the role Lanssac was to play in the proceedings, due to the prelates knowledge and authority. Lorraine oversaw the marshalling of the French delegation in support of the positions of the Imperial delegation: seeking the right for the clergy to be able to marry, for the laity to take communion in both kinds and the adoption of usage of the vernacular in some church contexts.

Lanssac's requests for relief continued into 1563, and he again asked to be relieved in both March and April of that year, reminding Catherine of his long service outside the kingdom. His repeated attempts to escape the charge led to some suggesting he be replaced by the bishop of Orléans.

In the final sessions of the council of Trento, the three diplomats made the queen's policy of religious moderation, and obedience to the peace edict of Amboise (which had brought the civil war in France to a close) clear. Lanssac ceased to play the role of diplomat to the council in July 1563, several months before the other members of the mission ceased their roles. He had finally been granted permission for his relief, and informed the duca di Ferrara of this on 2 July. He would depart on 6 July. Shortly before his departure he wrote to the bishop of Rennes to recommend to him that portraits of the two daughters of the king of the Romans be sent to the French court to further plans for a royal marriage that would be realised in 1570 by Charles' marriage to Elisabeth von Österreich.

Much later, in 1588, when a committee from the Estates General, among whom Lanssac was a member were reviewing whether the Tridentine decrees (the resolutions of the council of Trento) should be adopted in France, Lanssac mounted a spirited defence of both the council and the decrees it had promulgated, which he argued they were obliged to adopt. He was challenged in this by D'Espeisses. D'Espeisses enquired of Lanssac as to whether his opinion on the council was the same now as it had been during its meeting, to which Lanssac answered in the affirmative. D'Espeisses then revealed a letter of Lanssac's written during the time of the council in which he complained about the council's 'unusual decrees' that were contrary to the interests of the French kingdom. It was further alleged in this letter that the decisions of the assembly were in fact emanated from the Pope in Rome and not from the council. After this the meeting of the committee descended into chaos. This was a triumph for the Gallican party that wished to resist the imposition of the Tridentine decrees in the kingdom.

=== Peace with England ===
Lanssac arrived back at the French court for the culmination of the siege of English held Le Havre, which had been ceded to them by the French Protestants during the civil war of 1562–1563. In an effort to bolster her sons authority and quash the efforts of the prince de Condé to secure the position of lieutenant-généraux du royaume, Charles was declared to have reached his majority at the parlement of Rouen on 15 August 1563. Lanssac was entrusted with delivering this edict to the parlement of Paris and securing its registration - in this his mission was a failure. The parlement resisted the edict, remonstrating with the king. Lanssac complained about their tardiness and attacks on the king as tolerating multiple religions. Receiving their remonstrance, Charles retorted that the declaration of his majority was not his decision but that of the princes du sang and his conseillers, he demanded they register the edict. After the parlement again remonstrated with the king, Charles declared that he wished the body provide justice to his subjects, not act as his guardians. With the edict finally registered, Lanssac was tasked with delivering the king's satisfaction to the court, and expressing Charles' hopes that going forward the court would be obedient to the crown. This tone aroused the umbrage of the prémier président of the parlement who resented the severe tone.

Charles charged Lanssac with responsibility for the enforcement of an edict which mandated the prohibition of weapons in Paris. He therefore liaised with the prévôt des marchands (provost of the merchants - de facto mayor of Paris) about the efforts he was undertaking to see the submission of privately held weapons in October 1563. As a result of this, the poor people of Paris handed in the weapons in their possession in return for compensation. Meanwhile, the wealthier residents of the capital were allowed to deposit their weapons in an area where they would be labelled until such time they could be reclaimed.

At this time, Lanssac enjoyed a position of influence with the queen mother Catherine in matters of foreign policy. Alongside him in this circle of advisors were the ambassador to Spain, the baron de Saint-Sulpice and former ambassador the bishop of Limoges; the bishops of Orléans and Valence; and most centrally the sécretaire d'État the baron de Châteauneuf. Lanssac, and the bishops of Limoges and Orléans formed a triumvirate in control of the kingdoms financial affairs after the death of Châteauneuf in 1567.

Alongside the bishop of Limoges, Lanssac would lead the negotiations with England to establish a settlement between the two countries now that Le Havre had been reconquered and the chancelier L'Hôpital had declared English rights to Calais to be forfeit. The negotiations began at Gravelines, before moving to Montceaux on 9 November 1563 and then heading to Paris. The long negotiations were handled dexterously by Lanssac. The resulting treaty of Troyes, signed on 12 April saw France assured eternal possession of Calais, reversing the time limited terms of Cateau-Cambrésis. Lanssac was not a signatory to the final treaty the French representatives of which were the bishop of Orléans and the sécretaire d'État Bourdin.

=== Mission to Spain ===
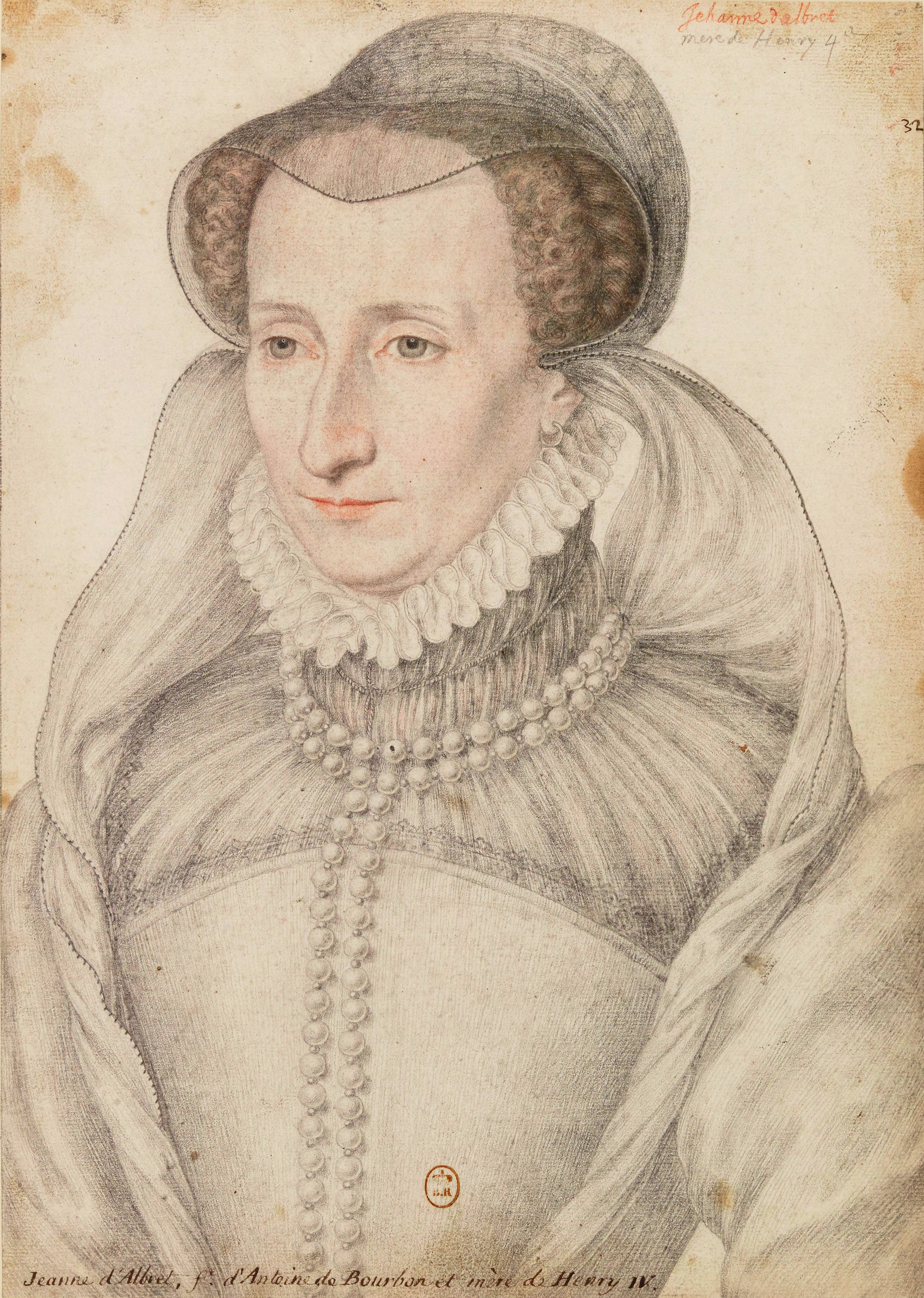
Queen of Navarre, Protestant noble whom the conspiracy of Philip II was a partial motivation for Lanssac's extraordinary diplomatic mission

In February 1564, Lanssac took on the role of extraordinary ambassador to Spain again. The purpose of his mission was to testify to Charles' commitment to reinforcing the peace. In addition to this responsibility there were concerns about the border with Flanders, the behaviour of the Spanish ambassador to France, and the Pope's attitude towards the queen of Navarre. Meeting with the French ambassador to Spain the baron de Saint-Sulpice on the way he arrived in Barcelona on 5 February. Contemporaneous to Lanssac's mission, a treasonous plot by the seigneur de Monluc to betray Béarn to Philip II and seized the queen of Navarre was revealed to the French court by Saint-Sulpice (though without knowledge of Monluc being party to the agreement). The revelation of this conspiracy made Philip far more timid in the policy, which would be reflected in his meeting with Lanssac. He presented the Spanish king with letters from Charles and Catherine, and assured him of the friendship the French crown had for the Spanish. Catherine's instructions to Lanssac made it clear that he was to impress upon Philip that Charles was satisfied with the queen of Navarre as she had restored the practice of Catholic religion in her territories, and was responding to a royal request to come to court. Philip explained to Lanssac that no weight should be put behind the idea that he would intervene in the favour of the English queen Elizabeth in her disagreements with France. He promised to sooth the troubles that caused discord between the French and Spanish on the border with Flanders. Philip assured that he would join the French protests against the Papal treatment of 'madame de Vendôme' (he would not address her as the queen of Navarre) at the Papal court. As for the French troubles with the Spanish ambassador Chantonnay, he had just been relieved of his posting at the French court. The Spanish king was more neutral on the prospect of a meeting between himself and Charles/Catherine. Lanssac took his leave of the Spanish king on 14 February, and was provided with letters for Catherine and Charles. In addition to these he wrote his own diplomatic despatch to the French court announcing the positive conclusion of his mission. He then travelled to Madrid where he met with the Spanish queen Élisabeth, whose esteem he enjoyed. After this he headed back to France, arriving back at Bordeaux on 10 March. Informed of the good favour Philip had indicated towards her from Lanssac's meeting with the king, the queen of Navarre endeavoured to thank the latter.

=== Grand Tour ===
Returning to France he frequented the parlement of Toulouse, observing it to be in a state of discord, before moving on to the parlement of Bordeaux. In April he wrote to Saint-Sulpice to warn him that the king and queen mother did not to hear requests from him to be relieved of his charge. The crown would however grant Saint-Sulpice 1,000 écus in return for this. Lanssac reported to the queen in the spring and summer of 1564 as to the tense religious situation in the south-west of France. In a letter of 28 July he informed Catherine that the country was not in the state of tranquillity it needed to be in, with men of different religions inflamed at each other, and inventing false stories of outrages. He further reported that in Carcassonne and particularly Montpellier he had borne witness to destroyed churches and houses. While he noted that the garrisons in the area were a great imposition, he counselled they could not be removed until such time as greater harmony was in effect. He made it clear that the continuation of the grand tour was the only tonic to the troubles he witnessed and urged the crown not to be diverted from its progress. Lanssac reported unfavourably on the actions of the parlement of Toulouse as further inflaming affairs. He noted the poor enforcement of the peace edicts prohibition on the bearing of arms, not all men of the church had received the return of their benefices and that in Saintonge and Périgord gentleman took the revenues of the benefices by force.

Catherine was at this time undertaking a grand tour of the kingdom with her son the king, to assure herself of the autonomy of the crown from the influence of the rival factions (chief among them the Lorraine-Guise). This was a 27-month voyage around France. To aid the accomplishment of this, at this time Catherine concentrated more state power in the hands of men whose loyalty to the crown was assured. She targeted uncommitted Catholic nobles of the older generation as well as new courtiers to this end. Among those elevated in this process were Louis de Gonzague, who was established as the duc de Nevers by marriage to the heiress Henriette, the comte de Retz and Lanssac. When the court had reached Roussillon, they wrote to Lanssac on 26 July. He was charged with joining with the baron de Jarnac the governor of La Rochelle and Aunis to work to ensure the people of the governate showed more obedience to the pacification edict. At this time Lanssac was at his residence in Bourg where he was putting his personal affairs in order. In August 1564 he convened the notables of La Rochelle urging them to uphold the edict of Amboise and suppress disorders in the city. The magistrates of the city were reminded of their obligations to the pacification edict, and he implored both the Protestant and Catholic clergy to avoid incendiary sermons and live in good peace with their neighbours even if they were another religion.

On 25 July 1564 the Holy Roman Emperor Ferdinand died. Lanssac was entrusted by Catherine with communicating the king's sadness at the news to the new Emperor Maximilian. He was also to negotiate an end to the wars of religion with Maximilian. At the time of receiving this mission he was in Avignon, and he travelled to Vienna, where, probably failing to find the Emperor, in November he travelled on to Prague. He was received very generously at the Imperial court, and would later write that any Imperial representative to France needed to be likewise fêted. Lanssac tried and failed to negotiate a marriage between Charles' sister Marguerite with the Emperor's son Rudolf. On 9 December he arrived in Augsburg where he was a guest of the Fugger. Back in France in February 1565 he met with his old patron the connétable de Montmorency in Toulouse who was preparing the way for the arrival of the French court. He was present for the king's lit de justice, upon the latter's arrival, and attended meetings of the conseil privé.

While the court was still in Toulouse, word arrived (Saint-Sulpice having written Lanssac and Élisabeth having written Catherine) of the successful negotiation of an interview that was to take place between Catherine and her daughter Élisabeth at Bayonne. The baron de Saint-Sulpice travelled to Bayonne to prepare Catherine to best be able to defend the French crown's conciliatory policy as regarded the Protestants. On the road to Bayonne he crossed paths with Lanssac, who was travelling to Spain to offer the thanks of Charles to Philip for agreeing to allow the interview to go ahead.

In April the court was in Bordeaux, and Lanssac was present for another lit de justice.

After the conclusion of the Bayonne Interview in July 1565, the court continued its progress from Bayonne up through Cognac.

The court arrived at Jarnac on 21 August 1565, where the Protestant baron de Jarnac was governor. As a friend of Jarnac's, Lanssac was entrusted with seeing to the maintenance of order in the region while the court was staying there. Jarnac indicated his support for the edict of Amboise, to the pleasure of Catherine and the king. Having left Jarnac the court made its way to Saintes, Marennes, Brouage and finally La Rochelle. These visits to places, many of which were dominated by Protestants, were accomplished without incident.

Lanssac disconnected from the tour in October so that he could effect his second marriage. Lanssac then received a new extraordinary diplomatic mission. This mission saw him head to the Holy Roman Empire. The purpose of this new mission was to reassure the German Protestant princes as to the nature of the discussions that had taken place at Bayonne. He was to assure them that no infringements upon the liberties granted to Protestants in the edict of Amboise had been discussed.

He was back at the court sometime before it arrived at Moulins. On 29 January 1566 at Moulins a grand meeting of the court declared the amiral de Coligny to be innocent of involvement in the 1563 assassination of the duc de Guise, Lanssac was many of the grandees who bore witness to this important declaration.

In 1566, sometime after the court had returned from the tour, Lanssac was given the mission to explain to the Spanish ambassador in France that Charles deplored the seditions that were occurring in Spanish Netherlands. He was to say that the French king wished to be well appraised of what was transpiring. With the court in Paris, there was concern about the large number of noble retinues of various factions in the city. As a result of this in addition to increasing the guard of the king, the queen requested the maréchal de Montmorency, who was the governor of the Île de France, to prohibit those who were not among the 'ordinary household' of a noble to be withdrawn from the city. Montmorency refused to enforce this request, and thus the queen turned to Lanssac and the baron de La Garde to implement it. At the end of July 1566, Lanssac took his leave of the king to return to his estates, and was substituted in his absence as governor of Charles by Saint-Sulpice.

By 17 January 1567, Lanssac was back in attendance of the conseils des finances, and he attended these meetings regularly until July. Around this time he was charged with investigating the robbing of the courier of the Spanish governor of the Netherlands, the duque de Alba. Catherine assured the Spanish ambassador on 22 August that Lanssac was to head to the post office at which the theft had transpired to rigorously punish those responsible. The matter was thus settled.

=== Second war of religion ===
Around this time the internal peace of France was shattered by an attempted Protestant coup in September 1567 which sought to seize the king. After the battle of Saint-Denis saw the triumph of the royal army over the Protestants in December, the war continued, but without further major engagements due to the lack of means of both sides. Lanssac was sent to the royal camp which was under the command of the king's brother the duc d'Anjou at Nemours and was informed there was no intention to stop the Protestant army from achieving juncture with a German force under the authority of von Pfalz-Simmern. As a result of the lack of funds, as early as December, the Protestants reached out to begin negotiations with the crown, sending Téligny to the court with the prince de Condé's proposal for peace. Soon thereafter, Coligny's brother cardinal de Châtillon met with the bishop of Orléans and Lanssac at Vincennes to conduct further negotiations on 17 January 1568, though for the moment nothing was agreed. After meeting with them, Châtillon met with several parlementaires then with the cardinal de Bourbon and Catherine. Lanssac and the bishop of Orléans would again be sent to inform Châtillon that the Protestant demands were unacceptable: i.e. that the pacification edict be permanently irreversible and that the king pay for Condé's mercenaries. Thus Châtillon returned to the Protestant camp empty handed. Condé was however determined to gain peace, and requested new negotiations. By mid March a peace deal had been reached. By the terms of Longjumeau the edict of Amboise which had brought the first civil war to a close was restored, affording Protestants limited rights of worship.

On 13 April 1568, Lanssac signed the contract of indemnity for the payment of the Protestant mercenaries. He was then entrusted by Charles with making it clear to the bourgeois of Paris that 1,000,000 livres was required to relieve the people of the pillage and ransoming they were subject to by the foreign mercenaries. After several deliberations, payment of the sum was accepted by the assembly in the hôtel de ville.

=== Third war of religion ===
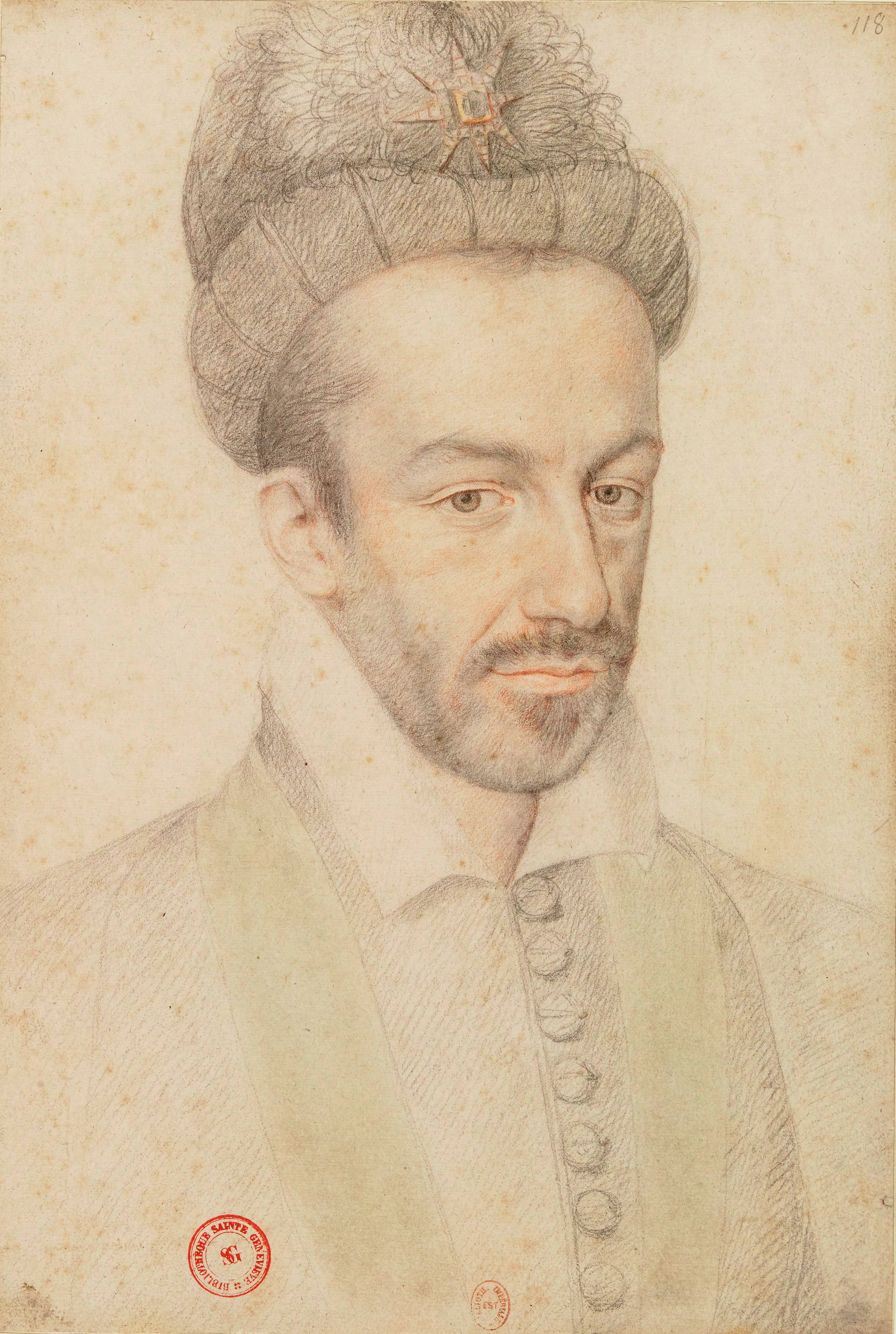
duc d'Anjou, brother to Charles IX and subsequently king as Henry III

The peace of Longjumeau would prove to be less a peace than a short truce in the civil wars. Outrages were committed against its terms by both Protestants and Catholics. Catherine summoned the conseil privé to get their opinions on how to proceed. Lanssac opined that royal justice needed to be re-established with usage of force singularly exercised by the crown. He suggested each city should have a gentleman appointed by the king who would see justice and peace brought forth and evil punished. The conseil would not reach a conclusion on that day, and the state of civil war worsened. On 27 September, Lanssac was present for the decision to outlaw Protestantism.

The brother of the king, the duc d'Anjou departed from the capital to lead the royal army against the rebels on 4 October 1568.

Though the army was technically under the charge of the young prince, Catherine selected the maréchal de Tavannes and Lanssac to jointly command the 'battle' of the army (the main body of soldiers between the vanguard and rear-guard). Their shared command proved to be an issue, inducing paralysis in the army. Lanssac attempted to oversee an assault of La Charité but was unsuccessful in this and the city remained in Protestant hands. Compounding this reversal, the Protestants seized first Châtellerault on 12 July and then Lusignan on 20 July 1569.

During these months therefore, the Protestant rebels were able to take the initiative. The royal army would however achieve a great coup at Moncontour in October 1569, routing the army of Coligny with the capture of both his artillery and baggage. The king was jealous of his brothers successes and therefore on 19 October he charged Lanssac with putting Protestant held Lusignan to siege. Travelling to Lusignan with his brother in law René de Rochechouart, the governor of Lusignan the baron de Mirambeau surrendered the town to them on 28 October on promise of safe conduct. When the Protestant leader Coligny learned of the easy surrender he was furious, and announced that had he got Mirambeau in his grasp he would have had him executed.

Anjou meanwhile had settled in for a siege of Saint-Jean-d'Angély. Here he was joined by the king. Lanssac was tasked by Charles with making his way to Bordeaux where there was rumour of a Protestant plot, and to see to the reduction of Blaye which was held by the Protestant seigneur de Pardaillan. Several Bordeaux parlementaires were held in captivity there. Meeting Pardaillan's brother on route, Lanssac made a request that Pardaillan restore Blaye to the king's obedience. This was refused and Lanssac despaired in seeing Blaye restored to royal authority by means of diplomacy. He thus headed to Bordeaux where he requested the payment of the sum requested by the baron de La Garde for the payment of his soldiers. The money was quickly found, and Lanssac sent out inquiries from the king to several seigneurs (including his son-in-law the comte de Luxe) to inquire what they could do to support king Charles in Béarn against the Protestant queen of Navarre. The enterprise inspired by this effort was a dismal failure, with the queen of Navarre having three of the instigators of the troubles hanged, and Lanssac had to engage himself to see his son-in-law spared from execution. With sporadic violence continuing to plague the border of Guyenne and the Navarrese lands, Lanssac made an appeal to Charles to dispatch a great noble to Guyenne to unite the factions of the province. He also saw to it that Luxe was generously compensated by the crown for his efforts. At this time Lanssac enjoyed the temporary authority of the lieutenant-generalcy of Guyenne.

As the duc d'Anjou reached adulthood and began to constitute his own household, Lanssac and the cardinal de Lorraine would often find themselves following him, despite not holding a position in the young prince's household. By 1570 Lanssac's son Guy de Saint-Gelais would enter the circle of the duc d'Anjou, alongside the son of another of Catherine's principle advisors, the baron de Saint-Sulpice.

Though he asked to be allowed to return to the court from Bordeaux, the continuity of seditions in the area would mean this was only granted in January 1570. Before taking leave of the Bordeaux parlement he informed them that they could raise money by selling the property of Protestants who had entered rebellion. Meeting with the royal court at Angers he was tasked with seeing to the reception of the seigneur de La Guesle, prémier président of the Parlement of Dijon. To this end he travelled to Paris.

Upon the death of the bishop of Aire and Dax, Lanssac made efforts to ensure that the benefice remained in the hands of the Foix-Candalle family, who were allied with the Montmorency. He wrote to the duc de Montmorency as soon as he learned of the death to assure him of this.

In August 1570, the civil war was concluded in the Peace of Saint-Germain-en-Laye. All members of the conseil privé including Lanssac had to swear to uphold its terms. Lanssac was sent to secure the oaths of the Protestant leaders to uphold the edict at Les Riceys on 21 August.

=== Alienation from Spain ===
The peace of Saint-Germain which brought to a close the third French War of Religion through the provision of toleration to the Protestants opened up a new period of Spanish hostility with France. The Spanish ambassador in France, Álava denounced the French ambassador in Spain, Fourquevaux, by saying that he was like Lanssac (a man he particularly hated) in being of 'Turkish stock'. Lanssac was among the conseillers whose Catholic faith was doubted by Álava at this time (alongside the duc de Montmorency, the bishops of Orléans, Limoges and Rennes and the maréchal de Vielleville.

Lanssac received the new English ambassador Francis Walsingham, and took him to present his credentials to Catherine on 25 January 1571. Due to the fact that Mary, queen of the Scots remained a prisoner of the English queen, the reception Walsingham received was a frosty one.

In his capacity as capitaine de la compagnie des cent gentilshommes de la maison du roi (the body of which he led in parade) he was involved in the entries into Paris of Charles, and his new wife Elisabeth on 6 and 29 March respectively. He was back in the capital in October to collect 530,000 livres which was to be devoted to the payment of the German reiters. The banker Scipion Sardini offered to provide the majority of this sum assuming he could be assured reimbursement. Though he struck stringent terms, they were accepted. A further 50,000 was required for the mercenary captain von Pfalz-Simmern, and Lanssac had to report to the court that he awaited the return of the maréchal de Cossé before he could realise this loan.

The queen mother saw to the elevation of Lanssac as a chambellan in the royal household in 1572. He would still be in possession of this post in 1575 at the start of the reign of Henry III. The post of chambellan was senior to that of the gentilhomme de la chambre, and traditionally there were four such officers at the head of the gentilshommes. Henry III would seek to dilute the dynasties that Catherine had put in place in the royal household after his coronation, and expanded the post such that there were thirteen chambellan by 1580.

On 29 April 1572, the treaty of Blois was established between England and France by which France offered to support England if the Spanish king tried to descend against the English coast. To ratify this treaty, a large delegation of English nobles arrived in Paris on 8 June 1572. Lanssac saw to it that they were lavished with celebrations and various entertainments during their stay. The English ambassador Walsingham thanked Lanssac with the gift of three greyhounds.

=== St Bartholomew's Day Massacre ===
During the St Bartholomew's Day Massacre, in which many Protestants across France were murdered, Lanssac played the role of protector to the young La Rochefoucauld, the son of the prominent Protestant noble the prince de Marcillac who was killed during the massacre. Lanssac shielded La Rochefoucauld in his Parisian residence on the rue Saint-Honoré along with the young prince's governor and the memoirist Jean de Mergey who was a noble of the La Rochefoucauld entourage. The La Rochefoucauld and Saint-Gelais families both claimed descent from the Lusignan family and thus were arguably of the same house. Indeed, Lanssac quartered his arms with those of Lusignan.

In the aftermath of the violence, the English ambassador Walsingham desired to hear from the king on the causes of the slaughter, before he wrote his despatch to Elizabeth. The streets were still considered too unsafe, so Lanssac and the sieur de Mauvissière with twelve other gentleman accompanied him from his hôtel to the Louvre. Lanssac, the bishops of Orléans and Limoges and the sécretaire d'État Villeroy advised Charles to blame the house of Lorraine-Guise for the massacre.

At the end of 1572 and beginning of 1573, the project of seeing the duc d'Anjou's election as king of the Rzeczpospolita Obojga Narodów (Polish-Lithuanian Commonwealth) was undertaken. Lanssac with pleasure saw that his eldest son Guy was to hold a place in the embassy to secure the prince's election. The negotiation was a success, and Lanssac requested that the duc d'Anjou bestow the office of grand écuyer on his son, though by contrast this was not a success.

On 17 July 1573, the comte de Retz resigned from the charge of capitaine de la compagnie des cent gentilshommes de la maison du roi, so that he might assume the post of maréchal, and the sieur de Chavigny was elevated to the prestigious charge formerly occupied by the comte. Lanssac had held the other of the two captaincies since at least 1564. This posting brought with it an income of 1,600 livres.

=== Chevalier d'honneur ===
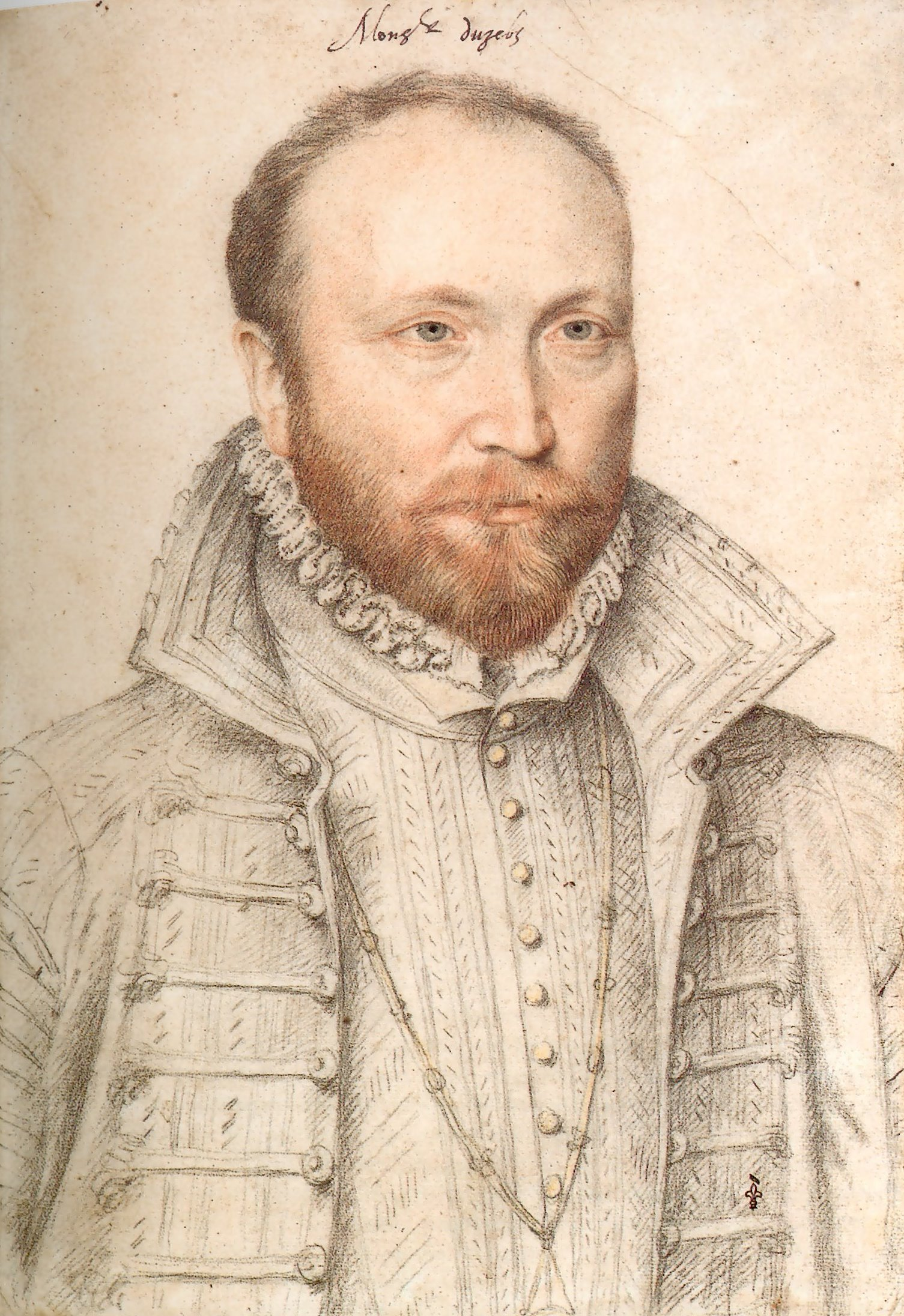
Duc d'Uzès who preceded Lanssac as Catherine's chevalier d'honneur

On 15 August 1573 the holder of the post of chevalier d'honneur (knight of honour) to Catherine, the duc d'Uzès died and the office thus fell vacant. Lanssac who had long been a favourite of Catherine's was elevated to the position of her premier gentilhomme de la chambre as well as her chevalier d'honneur at this time. Le Roux argues that in the absences from the court of Lanssac, the maréchal de Matignon served as a de facto chevalier d'honneur in his place. The posting of chevalier d'honneur brought with it an income of 1,200 livres and was held until the death of the incumbent.

On 13 September 1573, Lanssac was present for the receipt of the Polish ambassadors who came to announce the successful election of the duc d'Anjou. Lanssac, aware of local customs, and likely at the instigation of Catherine, advised the young king to make sure that during dinners he did not isolate himself away from the diplomats and local Polish nobility by ensuring they were seated at his table. Having travelled to his new kingdom he would be crowned in February 1574. The duc d'Anjou did not embody this advice during his time in the country, and gradually withdrew to a more close circle of his entourage.

=== Malcontents ===
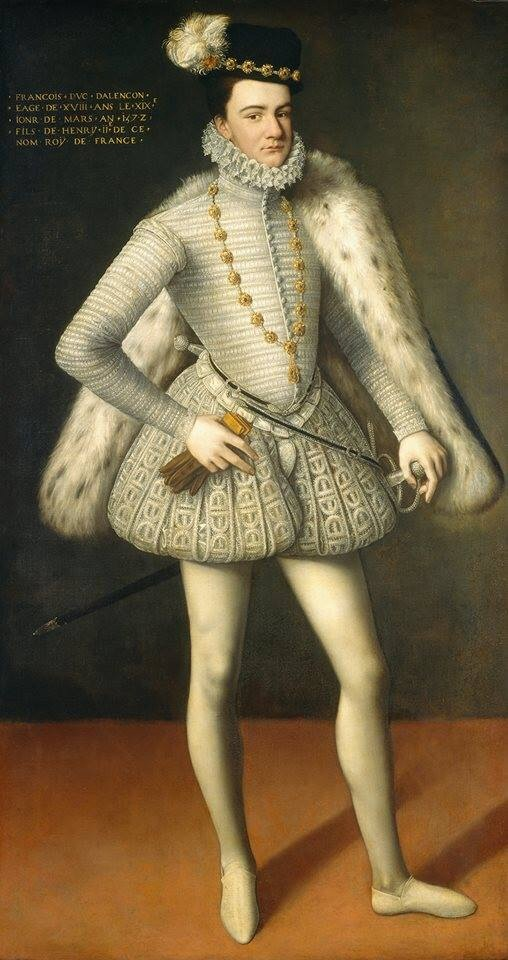
Duc d'Anjou the youngest brother of king Charles IX who entered rebellion against the crown in the 1570s

During the absence of Anjou from France, a conspiracy was uncovered by which the king's youngest brother the duc d'Anjou and the young Protestant king of Navarre were to be liberated from the court and taken to head the Protestants in the south west of the kingdom. As a result of the uncovering of this conspiracy, La Môle and Coconas two of the conspirators were arrested, and the maréchaux de Cossé and duc de Montmorency locked in the Bastille. Lanssac was closely involved with this process, attending a meeting at the house of the premier président with the procureur général (attorney general). On the day of La Môle's arrest, he ordered the procureur général to ensure that the prisoner and those with him did not liaise with anyone, and that they be removed of their valuables with which they might seek to bribe guards. When a necromancer named Cosimo was arrested, Lanssac instructed the procureur général to question him on waxen images that had been found in the possession of La Môle.

Shortly after the execution of La Môle and Coconas, on 17 May, Lanssac was sent to see to the pacification of Étampes with a company of 100 gentleman. He was back with the king by the end of the month where he witnessed the death of the monarch he had served as governor to since the 1550s. He was entrusted with guarding the body of the king.

== Reign of Henry III ==
=== Council and office ===
Having returned to France on the death of his brother, Anjou now styled himself king Henry III. The new king met with his conseil d'État at Lyon upon his re-entry into the kingdom in September 1574. This conseil contained a small set of grandees: the queen mother Catherine, the new king's younger brother Alençon, the king of Navarre, the cardinal de Lorraine and cardinal de Guise, the bishops of Orléans and Limoges, the parlementaire the comte de Cheverny and Lanssac. They ratified the decision Henri had made on his journey back to France to hand over the remaining French Piemontese lands to the duca di Savoy (duke of Savoy). He would still be a member of this conseil d'État when it met two years later in 1576. By this time, due to the need to accommodate his brother Alençon's power and satisfy the grandees of the kingdom the conseil had expanded to containing 134 members. Le Roux argues that political power did not lie with the conseil d'État but rather with the conseil des affaires. The conseil des affaires by contrast to the conseil d'État afforded a prominent position to the members of the king's entourage.

Bsack on 18 July 1574 the capitaine des gardes du corps the vicomte d'Auchy had died. Catherine hoped to see her man, Lanssac succeed to the charge, however the new king Henri was determined to stamp his authority on such affairs and not simply accept his mothers clients. Thus he placed the sieur de Rambouillet (who had already begun exercising the responsibilities with the king in Turin on his way back to France) in the post instead of Lanssac. By this means he ensured he had a man in the post who had demonstrated their loyalty to him as opposed to a loyalty to Catherine. Nevertheless, Lanssac and the sieur de Chavigny were confirmed in their positions as capitaines des cent gentilshommes.

=== Fifth war of religion ===
With the pressing financial situation brought about by the civil war in 1575, Henri called together his financial advisers in June. This small group included alongside Lanssac, the chancelier Birague, the intendant des finances Claude Marcel, the bishop of Orléans, the comte de Cheverny and Martin de Beaune. These figures conducted negotiations with various officials to see to the collection of the taille (direct land tax), gabelles (salt taxes) and various other taxes.

Catherine negotiated a truce with her rebellious son, the duc d'Alençon, in November 1575 by which he would gain Niort, Saumur, Angoulême and Bourges. Niort capitulated to the terms Catherine had negotiated after some effort, but the governor of Angoulême, the baron de Ruffec hotly resisted the request. Thus the duc de Montpensier was dispatched to see Ruffec surrender the city. To assist him Lanssac and the maréchal de Sansac who enjoyed significant influence in the Angoumois were entrusted with accompanying him. Their efforts were unsuccessful. Thus new negotiations between Catherine and Alençon were required in December to avoid the termination of the truce. Lanssac participated in these discussions by which La Charité, Cognac and Saint-Jean-d'Angély were offered to him as compensation for the failure to provide Angoulême.

By the peace that brought the war to a close Protestants were granted full rights of religious liberty outside of Paris. A further term of the peace was the granting of 2,000,000 livres to the landesherr von Pfalz-Lautern (whose soldiers threatening Paris to where Catherine and Lanssac had returned). This was to be paid over two instalments. Though the money would be raised in time, the provision of the hostages Pfalz-Lautern requested were not.

To pay off the vast costs Pfalz-Lautern demanded, an Estates General was convened at the end of 1576. Lanssac attended this meeting which transpired at Blois. Lanssac and Chavigny stood on either side of the king's throne carrying their axes representing their respective roles as capitaine de cent gentilshommes de la maison du roi. He participated in the discussions of the conseil privé during the meeting of the Estates. The body did not provide the financial relief the king had hoped they would.

=== Sixth war of religion ===
The king found himself in Poitiers at the time of the sixth war of religion in 1577. The regions of Poitou and Saintonge were feared to be home to armed bands of Protestants. Therefore, for the security of the court in Poitiers, a small city that was vulnerable to infiltration due to its overcrowding, the city was divided into military districts. These districts were placed under the responsibility of those close to Henri: Orsini, the sieur de Rambouillet, the seigneur de Villequier, de Fiesque and Lanssac. When the king returned to Paris he brought soldiers with him into the city.

With the return of peace in the form of the treaty of Bergerac negotiated by Catherine with the king of Navarre, one of the terms established prohibitions on the boarding of vessels. Lanssac's son Guy ignored these prohibitions and boarded both Rochelais and English vessels. This was an embarrassing situation for the French crown, and Henri disowned his rebellious governor Guy. Meanwhile, Lanssac had to apologise on his sons behalf to the English ambassador.

The king's brother, Alençon, who had been coaxed back to court undertook a dramatic escape from the court with his favourites in February 1578. Catherine quickly endeavoured to see her son returned to the court, and travelled to meet with the prince alongside Lanssac and the duc de Montpensier. However, Alençon feigned illness and refused to receive her. Free of the court, Alençon turned his attentions to his designs in the Spanish Netherlands.

In 1578 Lanssac was bought out of his position as capitaine de la seconde compagnie des cent gentilshommes de la maison du roi by the seigneur de Loué who purchased it from him for 60,000 livres. Le Roux argues it is likely Henri encouraged Lanssac to cede the charge in the hopes of replacing the old man of his mothers clientele with his own man. Loué would never assume the charge and rather it would be the comte de Marennes who took on the responsibility in 1578.

=== Pacification of the south ===
Starting on 2 August 1578, the queen mother began a trip into the south of the kingdom, so that she might reunite Marguerite de Valois with her husband the king of Navarre. Shortly after the departure Lanssac rendezvoused with the queen for the trip south. Lanssac played host to the party at Bourg on the journey, and buoyed the spirits of the party. While initially intended to meet in Bordeaux, the king of Navarre refused to enter the city and thus Catherine and Navarre met near La Réole instead. While there, the two sides signed 'articles'. Catherine and Marguerite then carried onwards, arriving in Toulouse to be greeted by the baron de Damville, governor of Languedoc, and the vicomte de Joyeuse his lieutenant-général on 28 October. The progression continued onwards through various southern towns until arriving at Nérac in February 1579 for negotiations with the Protestants. Lanssac would be one of the signatories for the agreement that was reached for the Catholics. Heading onwards to Provence, both Lanssac and the cardinal d'Armagnac would attempt to sooth the troubles of the province.

In the crisis created by the rebellion of the disgraced royal favourite the baron de Bellegarde in 1579, Catherine was entrusted with negotiating with the errant noble who was held up in Saluzzo. She thus made her way into Dauphiné after concluding affairs in Provence. Catherine travelled to Lyon with the baron de Ruffec, the duc de Mayenne, the cardinal de Bourbon, the parlementaire Paul de Foix and Lanssac. Bellegarde was successfully convinced to negotiate with her, and a meeting was arranged for Montluel on 17 October, Bellegarde arriving two days prior. Bellegarde assures her of his loyalty. In return for this assurance, Catherine offered him the government of Saluzzo. No sooner had Bellegarde returned to Saluzzo than he died on 20 December, making the reconciliation that had been negotiated between him and the crown meaningless.

=== Chevalier de l'Ordre du Saint-Esprit ===
In 1578 Henri created a new most senior order of French chivalry, known as the Ordre du Saint-Esprit (Order of Saint-Esprit). He hoped it would replace the ordre de Saint-Michel which had 'fallen into disuse'. Lanssac would receive the honour of being made a chevalier of this ordre in the induction of 31 December 1579 alongside several princes du sang including the prince de Conti; the bishop of Langres; the maréchal de Matignon; the ambassador to England La Mothe-Fénelon and the former ambassador to Spain the seigneur de Saint-Sulpice. A solemn service was held in the church of Grand-Augustins on 1 January 1580 for the new chevaliers.

When the new English ambassador Cobham was granted his reception in January 1580, he was escorted by Jérôme de Gondi to Catherine's chambers. Outside of the queen mothers chambers he was received by Lanssac, the duc de Guise, duc de Nevers and the sécretaires d'État (secretaries of state). The king for his part was accompanied by only a few men.

=== Nevers against Montpensier ===
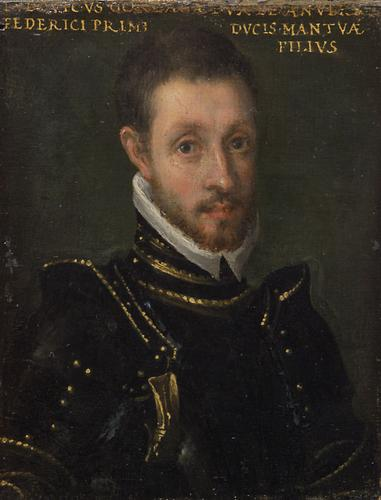
Duc de Nevers one party to the quarrel of 1580 to 1581

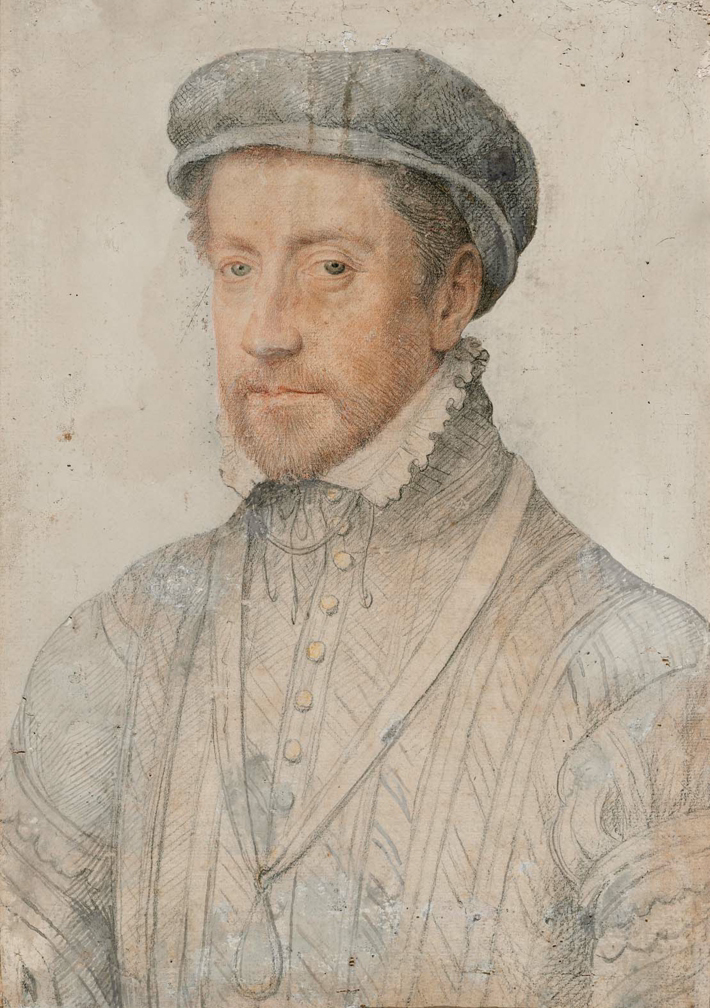
Duc de Montpensier one party to the quarrel of 1580 to 1581

Starting in March 1580 a quarrel emerged between the duc de Nevers and the duc de Montpensier. Montpensier reported to the king's brother Alençon that Nevers had intended, when he was tasked with subduing the rebel prince in 1575 to see him killed. Nevers took great offence at this 'slanderous' implication which he indicated he considered to be accusing him of lèse majesté (crime against the dignity of the crown). Montpensier produced a declaration on the matter to which Nevers responded by publishing a denial.

Moving from a war of words, both Montpensier and Nevers looked to mobilise their patronage networks in the dispute. Henri meanwhile hoped to end the dispute which threatened to upset the balance in court and the reconciliation the king was attempting to effect with his brother Alençon. Alençon further inflamed matters by taking Montpensier's side in the dispute.

In May 1580, Henri dispatched his first envoy to entreat with Montpensier. This was followed in September by a temporary restraint on the duc de Nevers who was limited in his movement to his own lands. In December, Lanssac was sent to parlay with the duc de Montpensier by the king. That same month in a meeting of the conseil privé at Blois including the duc d'Alençon and king of Navarre it was declared that the duc de Montpensier had no cause to take offence at the statements of the duc de Nevers. This failed to satisfy Montpensier and it was followed in January with the dispatch of the sieur de Rambouillet to Nevers. Nevers was informed of the outcome of Lanssac's dealings with Montpensier by his friend the seigneur de Ruffey. The latter succeeded in drawing from the duc a letter that his earlier writing had not been directed at the duc de Montpensier.

In the settlement reached on 18 April 1581, the king declared that Montpensier had no cause to be offended by the manifesto published by the duc de Nevers as it was not about him, and that likewise Nevers had no cause to be offended by Montpensier's declaration as it did not concern him. The dispute was thus condemned to oblivion.

With the extension of the male line of the House of Aviz, Lanssac played a role in the French negotiations over the fate of Portugal in October 1580.

=== Alençon's English match ===
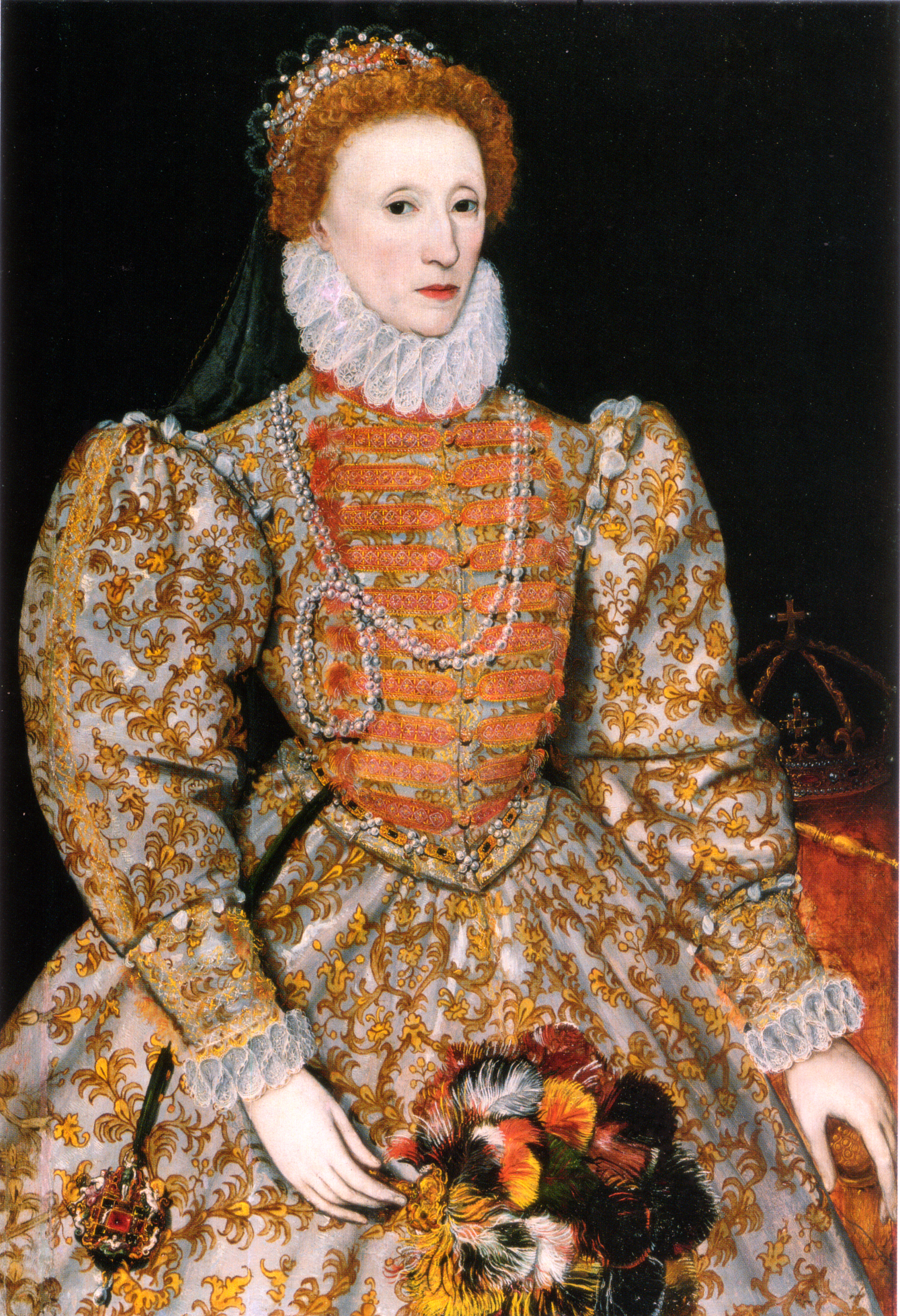
Elizabeth I, queen of England and marriage prospect for the duc d'Alençon

A large extraordinary diplomatic mission was dispatched to England in the spring of 1581 for the purpose of sealing the deal on a marriage between queen Elizabeth and the duc d'Alençon. The delegates for the mission were selected on 15 January. Lanssac was one of the men charged with involvement. Alongside him in the mission were the princes du sang the duc de Montpensier, prince-dauphin and comte de Soissons; the maréchal de Cossé, the governor of haute-Normandie the baron de Carrouges, the former ambassador to England La Mothe-Fénelon, the parlementaire Brisson and the sécretaire d'État Pinart. Lanssac departed Blois to join this mission on 16 February, and was granted 3,000 écus for his expenses. The actual departure across the channel would be delayed however. Meanwhile, Catherine advised Lanssac that if Elizabeth sunk the marriage proposal, he could still negotiate a treaty with England. They finally departed on 16 April on English ships which had arrived in Calais weeks previous. They were received in England by a number of great lords dispatched by Elizabeth. The party enjoyed its audience with Elizabeth on 24 April 1581 and she spoke with each ambassador individually. Lanssac flattered her with complements on behalf of Catherine, and then took the opportunity of her leaving from where she was seated due to the heat to privately present her letters from Catherine and explained the specific charge he had from the queen mother. He further explained that it was Catherine's desire that Elizabeth allow herself to sit for a portrait.

The audience then ended for the day, resuming on 25 April. Lanssac, Carrouges, the prince-dauphin and Mauvissière were invited to eat at her table. Elizabeth then received Lanssac, and some of the other commissioners in her private chambers. Lanssac requested the prince-dauphin to make a plea of the queen to deputise some lords of her council to complete the project of marriage. Elizabeth deputised 5 or 6 lords to this effect. A few days later on 28 April, Elizabeth explained her hesitancy to go through with the marriage on the grounds of her age, the rebellion in England in response to the prospect of the marriage and Alençon's enterprises in the Netherlands. The embassy came to fear popular anger due to the fact of Alençon's Catholicism and the possibility a pregnancy could kill the queen. Over the coming days the ambassadors were treated to festivities, banquets and tournaments. The English hoped that they could secure an alliance with the French prior to going further on a marriage plan, however the ambassadors were not authorised to discuss affairs beyond the marriage.

A marriage contract, drawn up by the président Brisson was approved on 11 June. Two days later Lanssac and the other ambassadors took their leave. Their negotiations would ultimately prove to have been fruitless, Elizabeth avoiding any commitment to Alençon. Lanssac arrived back in France on 28 June, taking a time to rest before delivering his report on his specific diplomatic mission to Catherine.

Lanssac continued to enjoy the ear of Catherine to whom he was the chevalier d'honneur, and when she headed the royal council in 1581, he would be there to advise her alongside La Mothe-Fénelon, Pinart, the seigneur de Genlis, the chancelier (chancellor) Birague and the garde des sceaux (possessor of the chanceliers seals) Cheverny. Le Roux notes that these men had more connection to Catherine than they did their king, Henri.

After a time in his baronnie, Lanssac was back at the court by 25 September where he was charged by the conseil privé with delivering an edict to the chambre des comptes. He then returned to Bourg where he fulfilled a mission for the king of Navarre assuring him that both Protestants and Catholics were able to worship alongside one another in many cities. He saw to the re-opening of the church of Bourg and brought together the people of Bourg to see them swear to behave gently to one another without recourse to scandal.

=== Final diplomatic missions ===
In April 1582, Lanssac played host to the English ambassador who reported to him that if the marriage project between Elizabeth and the duc d'Alençon did not come to pass, it was through no doing of Elizabeth. Rather, the ambassador alleged, it was Henri who opposed the union. When Henri learned of this he send the sécretaire d'État Pinart to remonstrate with the ambassador that in fact the king desired nothing more than to see the marriage come to pass.

Over the coming year, Lanssac was often at the side of Catherine on her various travels around the kingdom. Catherine at this time was attempting to treat with her son the duc d'Alençon. While she was at Noisy-le-Roi in September 1583, Lanssac counselled that Pinart should be dispatched to Alençon to convince the prince that the policy he was pursuing was self destructive. The sécretaire further informed the prince that he should disband the soldiers he had raised. Pinart's entreaties did little and Catherine was forced to go to Château-Thierry herself to reason with her son.

Lanssac and Catherine again met with Alençon during the course of the illness that would kill the prince in March 1584. It was in part to find out his condition that they travelled to Château-Thierry. A further reason to meet with him was to again reason with him about his plans to get Henri to intervene against Spain in the Netherlands.

=== Ligue crisis ===
With the death of Alençon, Henri's heir became the Protestant king of Navarre. This was seized upon as an unacceptable state of affairs by segments of the Catholic nobility who re-founded a Catholic Ligue (League) to oppose both this succession and other royal policies. This ligue headed by the duc de Guise

On 17 January 1585 an agreement was reached between the duc de Guise, his brother the duc de Mayenne and other members of the Lorraine-Guise family on the one hand, and the Spanish crown on the other. By this agreement it was declared that the cardinal de Bourbon was the proper successor to Henri for the throne upon his death, and that king Philip would provide 600,000 écus to the ligueur party in France. In return, Guise promised the eradication of Protestantism, the recognition of the Trentine decrees, the return to the Spanish of French held Cambrai, the termination of the French alliance with the Ottoman Empire, the ending of French naval activity hostile to Spain and French support against the rebels in the Spanish Netherlands. Both Lanssac's legitimate (Guy) and illegitimate son (Urbain) who were well placed in southern France and as well seasoned diplomatically as their father aided in the establishing of the treaty between the ligue and Spain.

After the duc de Guise and the ligue entered rebellion against the crown, Catherine undertook negotiations with the errant prince. Struggling to get Guise to declare himself, she engaged other intermediaries in the hopes they would have better luck, among them the sécretaire d'État Pinart and Lanssac. However they reported no more success, claiming that Guise professed to be 'perplexed' himself. Lanssac and Catherine had hopes upon the arrival of the duc de Guise's daughter Renée de Lorraine the abbess of Saint-Pierre that she might be able to impress upon her father the importance of obeying the king.

Meanwhile, Catherine offered a spectacle of illness to Guise. Lanssac reported to a 'principal lady' of the court that her troubles were more mental than physical, as she was frustrated at the failures of her efforts of negotiation. On 12 May at the château de Sarry a conference was held between Catherine's party and those of the ligueurs. In attendance were the duc de Guise, duc de Lorraine, cardinal de Guise and cardinal de Bourbon for the ligueurs. For Catherine were the archbishop of Lyon, cardinal de Lenoncourt, the abbot of Chatelliers and Lanssac. The party of the ligue made it clear at the conference that they were seeking the sole practice of the Catholic religion in France.

Seeing the cardinal de Bourbon as the weak link in the ligueur chain, Catherine obtained for Lanssac a meeting with Bourbon's favourite the seigneur de Rubempré. Through Rubempré Lanssac was introduced to Bourbon on the excuse of delivering to him complements from Catherine. Though there was a temporary success in shaking his attachment to the ligueur cause, the interviews aroused the suspicion of the cardinal de Guise and the duc de Guise suddenly returned. By this means the effort to secure his defection was a dismal failure.

Catherine asked the cardinal de Bourbon and duc de Guise for their conditions of peace in writing so that she could present them to the king. These were drawn up for her on 9 June. After a few further conferences between Catherine and the leading ligueurs, peace was signed at Nemours on 7 July. By the terms of the Treaty of Nemours, Protestantism was outlawed and the ligue was completely triumphant.

=== Triumph of the ligue ===
Henri was obliged to raised three armies by the terms of Nemours to fight against the Protestants. Lanssac was charged by Henri with enquiring of Guise which army he desired command of (one at the centre of the kingdom, one to guard the frontier against German intervention and a final one to go against the king of Navarre). Guise elected to lead the army against the German frontier.

In 1586, Lanssac alongside the comte de Soissons and several chevaliers de l'ordre du Saint-Esprit were entrusted with seeing the cour des comptes (court of accounts) publish an edict the king had recently pushed through the parlements by the means of a lit de justice. On 25 June they were met with refusal from the cour. They returned next day to the chambre des comptes and made the will of the king clear. The edict was thus registered and published.

=== New southern peace mission ===
With the war progressing against her Protestant son-in-law in the south west of the kingdom, Catherine held out hopes of negotiating between the crown and the king of Navarre. Initially Catherine hoped negotiations could take place at the château de La Mothe-Saint-Héray, but the prince de Condé requested that it transpire between Cognac and Jarnac. Catherine thus departed from Chenonceau on 23 October, accompanied by the Duc de Montpensier, duc de Nevers, maréchal de Retz, chancelier de Birague, governor of Poitou the seigneur de Malicorne, and the royal favourites Lanssac and the sieur de Rambouillet among assorted others.

The first conference between this royal party and the Protestants took place on 13 December and was shortly thereafter followed by a second conference. The conferences started off on poor footing, with the sides far apart from one another. With bluntness Catherine had explained to the king of Navarre at the second conference that Henri's first plank of negotiation was to see his heir convert to Catholicism. Unable to overcome this obstacle the conference ended in failure. Navarre departed, and refused Catherine's request to meet with her at Niort. The civil war in the kingdom was thus left to be fought by arms as opposed to words.

In the middle of 1587, the German threat to the kingdom escalated and thus Catherine desired to achieve an understanding with the duc de Guise as to the repelling of the Germans. Thus she departed Meaux alongside the sécretaire d'État Pinart, surintendant des finances Bellièvre, royal favourite Villequier and Lanssac on 21 May. They met with the cardinal de Bourbon, cardinal de Vendôme, cardinal de Guise, cardinal de Vaudémont, the duc de Guise, duc de Mayenne and duc d'Elbeuf near Reims. The royal party tried to negotiate the ligueurs (leaguers) out of their unlawful occupation of various Picard towns.

Henri again turned to Lanssac for assistance with the passage of a fiscal edict through the examinations of the chambre des comptes in September 1587 to help support the costs of the royal armies.

That same month Lanssac was tasked with getting the same fiscal edict pushed through the parlement of Paris. His first visit to the body was unsuccessful, and Catherine thus wrote a letter to the parlement. Despite this support, November arrived and the edict remained unregistered. On 18 November Lanssac was again sent to the parlement, where he obtained at last their approval of the edict.

In May 1588, the crown was gravely shaken by the day of the Barricades, a ligueur uprising of Parisians with the duc de Guise at their head, that saw the king and his court forced from the capital. One parlementaire had advised Henri to ride the streets of the capital with Villequier and Lanssac to reason with the people so that they might disassemble their barricades, however this would not transpire. After Henri's departure, Catherine, Villequier, Pinart and Lanssac remained in the capital so that they might conduct negotiations with the ligueur duc de Guise (and so that Lanssac might remain at the queen mother's side). The product of these negotiations would be the treaty established between the crown and the ligue on 21 July. By the terms of the Edict of Union, the edict of Nemours was re-affirmed, new governorships allocated to the Lorraine-Guise family, the raising of the duc de Guise to lieutenant-général du royaume and the royal favourite the duc d'Épernon was disgraced.

Peace between the ligue and the crown was solemnised with a thanksgiving mass at the cathedral of Notre-Dame on 19 July 1588. Cannons were fired in celebration and bonfires lit. Lanssac was among the many great noble attendees, which included the duc de Guise, duchesse de Montpensier, the cardinal de Bourbon and the royal favourite Villequier. The edict of peace was registered two days later on 21 July.

Lanssac was with the royal court for the tense reconciliation between Henri and the duc de Guise that transpired at Chartres.

In September, Henri effected a palace revolution by which he dismissed many of his chief ministers associated with Catherine. Despite being an attack on her, this did not effect Lanssac's position, and he remained at Catherine's side at court until at least 19 December.

Pushed towards a resumption of the war against the Protestants in 1588, Henri looked to raise funds to support the campaign from the servants of the crown. By this means 45,000 écus was gained by the crown for the effort between 30 August and 24 December 1588. Lanssac, as a client of Catherine's, lent 3,333 écus to this cause on 26 October.

=== Estates General and a coup ===
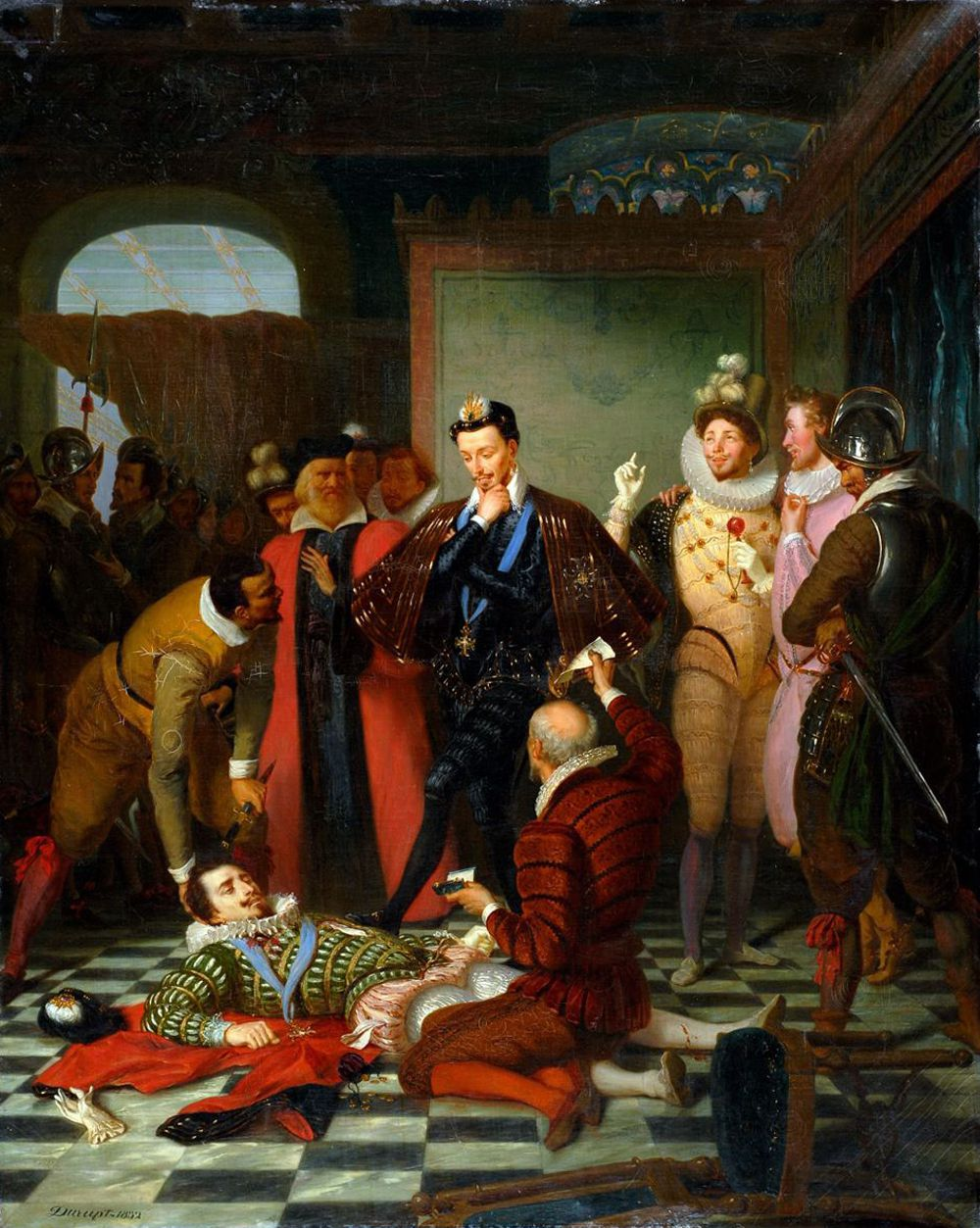
Assassination of the duc de Guise after which Lanssac's son's Guy and Urbain fled Blois and Lanssac himself retired to his estates

Lanssac attended the Estates General of 1588 in his capacity as a conseiller d'État (councillor of state). He was present for the king's addresses to the assembly. His illegitimate son, the bishop of Comminges served in the Estates as a representative of the First Estate.

After the assassination of the duc de Guise in December, Lanssac retired from the court to his estates at Précy-sur-Oise. Meanwhile, his sons Guy and the bishop of Comminges who in contrast to their father had both thrown in their lot closely with the ligue fled from Blois after the assassinations. On 5 January 1589 his great patron Catherine died. She awarded him 12,000 livres, and sought from Henri allocations from the forests of Bourgogne for the remainder of her debts to him.

=== Death ===
Lanssac died in 1593 at Précy-sur-Oise. It would be at Précy that his remains would be interred, as opposed to the abbey of Saint-Vincent in the old Saint-Gelais family haunt of Bourg. When his wife died a little while later, she would be buried alongside him in the church of Précy.

== Sources ==
- Babelon, Jean-Pierre (2009). Henri IV. Fayard.
- Boltanski, Ariane (2006). Les ducs de Nevers et l'État royal: genèse d'un compromis (ca 1550 - ca 1600). Librairie Droz.
- Boucher, Jacqueline (2012). Lettres de Henri III, Roi de France: Tome VII (21 Mars 1585-31 Décembre 1587). Société de l'Histoire de France.
- Boucher, Jacqueline (2023). Société et Mentalités autour de Henri III. Classiques Garnier.
- Brunet, Serge (2016). "La Ligue Campanėre (Pyrénées Centrales) et la fin des Ligues Hispanophiles de Guyenne et de Languedoc (1585-1596)". In Brunet, Serge (ed.). La Sainte Union des Catholiques de France et la fin des Guerres de Religion (1585-1629).
- Carpi, Olivia (2012). Les Guerres de Religion (1559-1598): Un Conflit Franco-Français. Ellipses.
- Chevallier, Pierre (1985). Henri III: Roi Shakespearien. Fayard.
- Cloulas, Ivan (1979). Catherine de Médicis. Fayard.
- Cloulas, Ivan (1985). Henri II. Fayard.
- Durot, Éric (2012). François de Lorraine, duc de Guise entre Dieu et le Roi. Classiques Garnier.
- Gellard, Matthieu (2014). Une Reine Épistolaire: Lettres et Pouvoir au Temps de Catherine de Médicis. Classiques Garnier.
- Gould, Kevin (2016). Catholic Activism in South-West France 1540-1570. Routledge.
- Haan, Bertrand (2011). L'Amitié Entre Princes: Une Alliance Franco-Espagnole au Temps des Guerres de Religion (1560-1570). Presses Universitaires de France.
- Harding, Robert (1978). Anatomy of a Power Elite: the Provincial Governors in Early Modern France. Yale University Press.
- Jouanna, Arlette (1989). Le Devoir de révolte: La noblesse française et la gestation de l'Etat moderne 1559-1661. Fayard.
- Jouanna, Arlette; Le Thiec, Guy; Biloghi, Dominique (1998). "Index des Noms de Personnes". In Jouanna, Arlette; Boucher, Jacqueline; Biloghi, Dominique; Le Thiec, Guy (eds.). Histoire et Dictionnaire des Guerres de Religion.
- Jouanna, Arlette (2015). The St Bartholomew's Day Massacre: The Mysteries of a Crime of State. Translated by Bergin, Joseph. Manchester University Press.
- Knecht, Robert (1996). The Rise and Fall of Renaissance France. Fontana Press.
- Knecht, Robert (2016). Hero or Tyrant? Henry III, King of France, 1574-1589. Routledge.
- Le Person, Xavier (2002). «Practiques» et «practiqueurs»: la vie politique à la fin du règne de Henri III (1584-1589). Librairie Droz.
- Le Roux, Nicolas (2000). La Faveur du Roi: Mignons et Courtisans au Temps des Derniers Valois. Champ Vallon.
- Le Roux, Nicolas (2006). Un Régicide au nom de Dieu: L'Assassinat d'Henri III. Gallimard.
- Le Roux, Nicolas (2013). Le Roi, La Cour, L'État de La Renaissance à l'Absolutisme. Champ Vallon.
- Le Roux, Nicolas (2020). Portraits d'un Royaume: Henri III, la Noblesse et la Ligue. Passés Composés.
- Le Roux, Nicolas (2022). 1559-1629 Les Guerres de Religion. Gallimard.
- Lhoumeau, Charles Sauzé de (1940). Un Fils Naturel de François Ier: Louis de Saint-Gelais, baron de la Mothe-Saint-Héray. Société Française d'Imprimerie et de Librairie.
- Pernot, Michel (2013). Henri III: Le Roi Décrié. Éditions de Fallois.
- Potter, David (1995). A History of France 1460-1560: The Emergence of a Nation State. Macmillan.
- Ribera, Jean-Michel (2018). Diplomatie et Espionnage: Les Ambassadeurs du Roi de France auprès de Philippe II - Du Traité du Cateau-Cambrésis (1559) à la mort de Henri III (1589). Classiques Garnier.
- Ritchie, Pamela E. (2002). Mary of Guise in Scotland 1548-1560. Tuckwell Press.
- Roelker, Nancy (1968). Queen of Navarre: Jeanne d'Albret 1528-1572. Harvard University Press.
- Roelker, Nancy (1996). One King, One Faith: The Parlement of Paris and the Religious Reformation of the Sixteenth Century. University of California Press.
- Romier, Lucien (1913). Les Origines Politiques des Guerres de Religion I: Henri II et L'Italie (1547-1555). Librairie Académique Perrin et Cie.
- Romier, Lucien (1914). Les Origines Politiques des Guerres de Religion II: La Fin de la Magnificence Extérieure, le Roi contre les Protestants (1555-1559). Librairie Académique Perrin et Cie.
- Salmon, J.H.M. (1979). Society in Crisis: France in the Sixteenth Century. Metheun & Co.
- Shaw, Christine; Mallett, Michael (2019). The Italian Wars 1494-1559: War, State and Society in Early Modern Europe. Routledge.
- Thompson, James (1909). The Wars of Religion in France 1559-1576: The Huguenots, Catherine de Medici and Philip II. Chicago University Press.
