= Salat (river) =

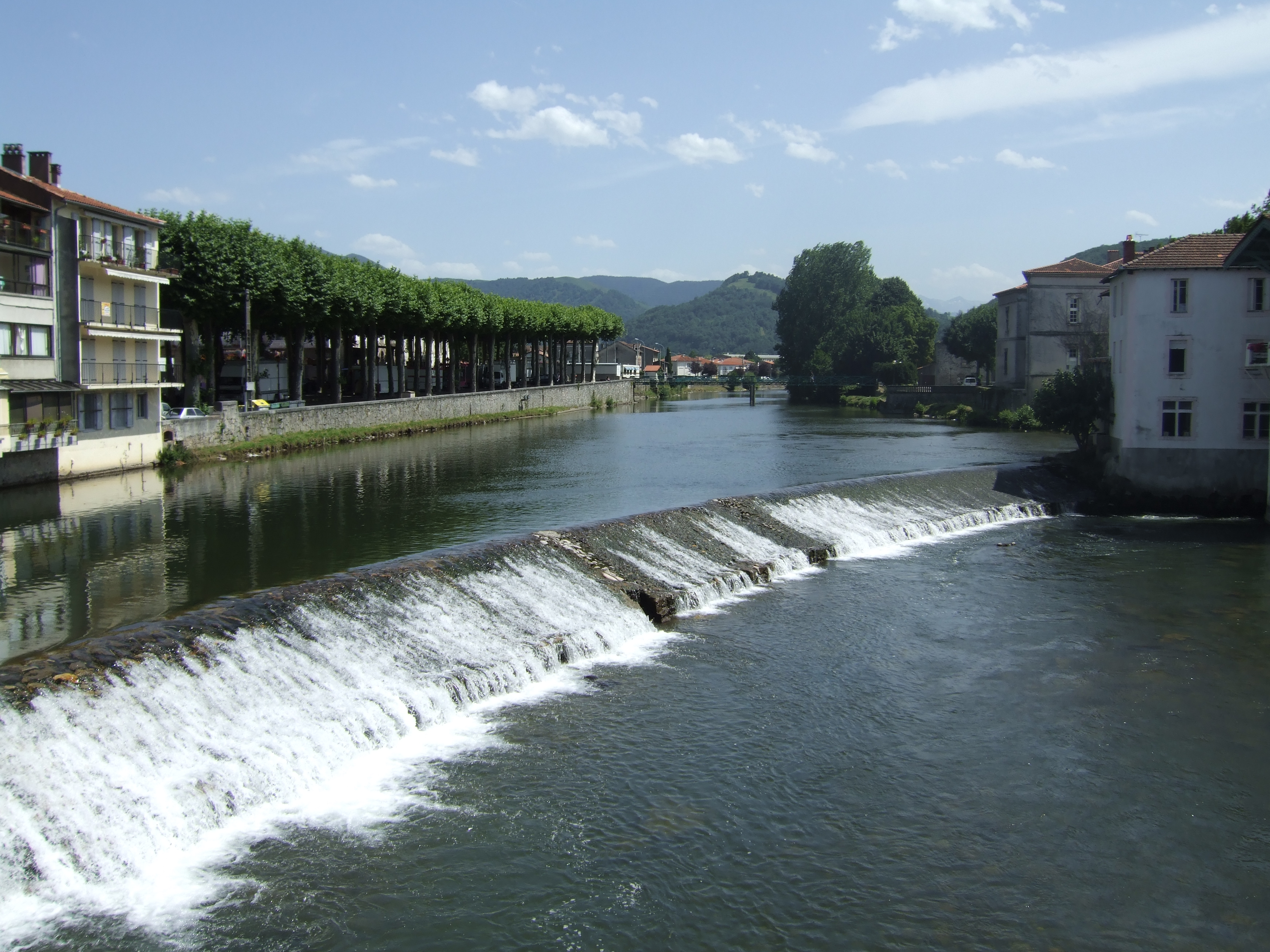
- In Saint-Girons

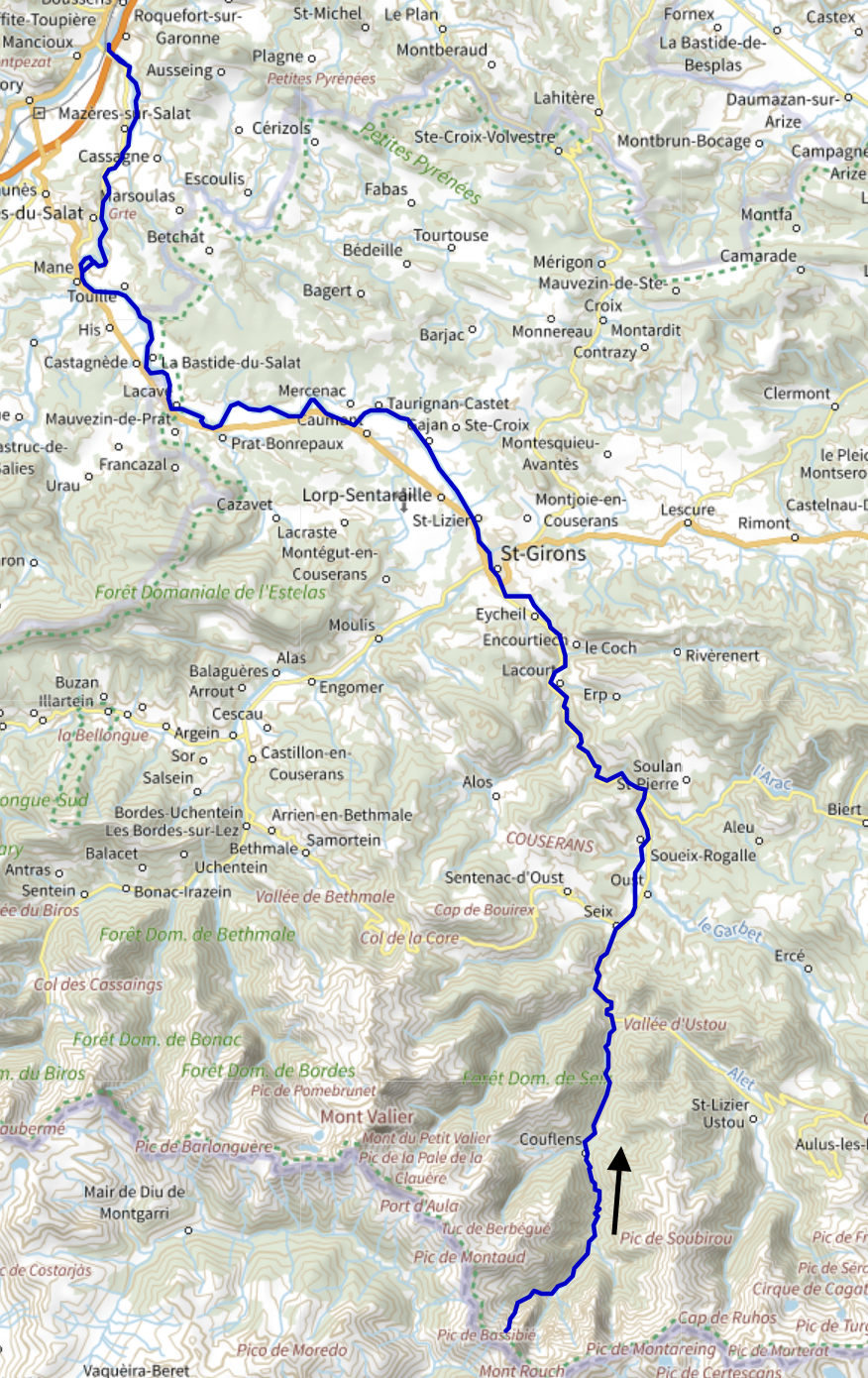

Location
- Country: France

Physical characteristics
- Source
  - location: Mont Rouch, Pyrenees
  - elevation: 2,500 m (8,200 ft)
- Mouth
  - location: Garonne
  - coordinates: 43°9′40″N 0°57′58″E
- Length: 74 km (46 mi)
- Basin size: 1,570 km^{2} (610 sq mi)
- Discharge
  - average: 43 m^{3}/s (1,500 cu ft/s)

Basin features
- Progression: Garonne→ Gironde estuary→ Atlantic Ocean

The Salat (French pronunciation: [salat]; Occitan: Salat) is a river in southern France, a right tributary of the Garonne. It is 74.1 km (46.0 mi) long. It rises in nine points above the hamlet Salau in the municipality Couflens, on the slopes of Mont Rouch, central Pyrenees. The former Gascon province of Couserans is based on its valley.

== Departments and Cities ==
- Ariège: Saint-Girons
- Haute-Garonne: Salies-du-Salat, Boussens.

== Main tributaries ==
- Alet
- Garbet
- Arac
- Lez
- Baup
- Arbas
