= Salies-du-Salat =

- Commune
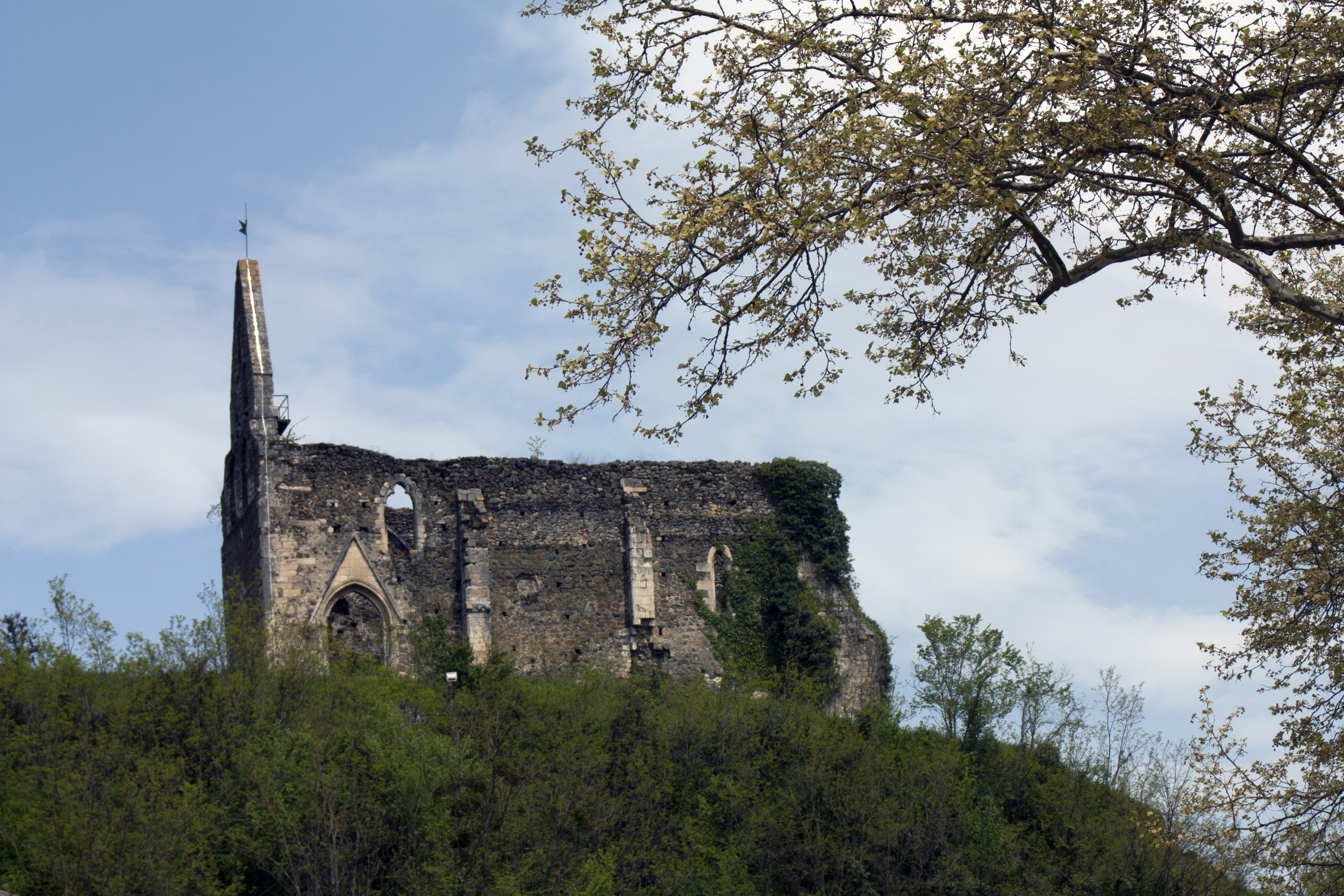
- The church in Salies-du-Salat

- Coat of arms
- Location of Salies-du-Salat
- Location within France Location within Occitanie
- Coordinates: 43°06′15″N 0°57′34″E
- Country: France
- Region: Occitania
- Department: Haute-Garonne
- Arrondissement: Saint-Gaudens
- Canton: Bagnères-de-Luchon
- Intercommunality: Cagire Garonne Salat

Government
  - Mayor (2020–2026): Jean-Pierre Duprat
- Area^{1}: 6.81 km^{2} (2.63 sq mi)
- Elevation: 300 m (980 ft)
- Highest elevation: 428 m (1,404 ft)
- Lowest elevation: 281 m (922 ft)
- Population (2023): 1,733
  - Density: 254/km^{2} (659/sq mi)
- Time zone: UTC+01:00 (CET)
  - Summer (DST): UTC+02:00 (CEST)
- INSEE/Postal code: 31523 /31260
- ^{1} French Land Register data, which excludes lakes, ponds, glaciers > 1 km^{2} (0.386 sq mi or 247 acres) and river estuaries.

Salies-du-Salat (French pronunciation: [saliz dy salat], literally Salies of the Salat; Occitan: Salias de Salat) is a commune in the Haute-Garonne department in southwestern France.

== Population ==
Historical population
Year	Pop.	±% p.a.
1968	1,975	—
1975	2,191	+1.49%
1982	2,154	−0.24%
1990	2,074	−0.47%
1999	1,943	−0.72%
2007	1,932	−0.07%
2012	1,877	−0.58%
2017	1,788	−0.97%
2023	1,733	−0.52%
Source: INSEE

== Economy ==
Salies-du-Salat is known for its hot springs. The spa buildings, recently renovated, form the center of the town.

There is a small casino located in the town. A weekly market takes place on Mondays in the centre of town.

== See also ==
- Communes of the Haute-Garonne department
