= Baup =

Baup is a surname. Notable people with the surname include:

- Élie Baup (born 1955), French football manager and goalkeeper
- Marie-Julie Baup (born 1979), French actress, writer, and comedian
