= Alet =

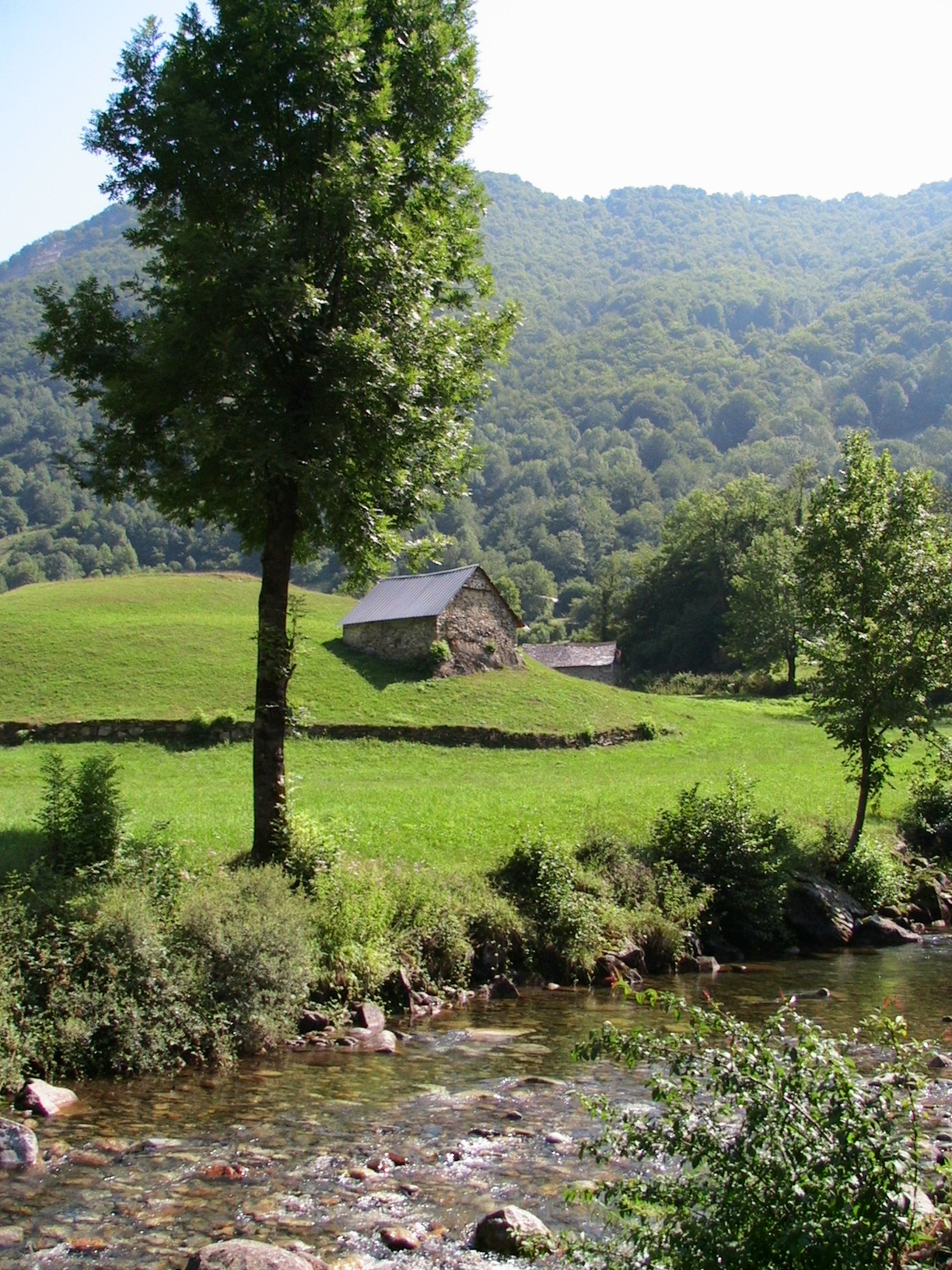

- Location within France Location within Occitanie

Location
- Country: France

Physical characteristics
- Source
  - location: Ariège, Pyrenees
- Mouth: Salat
  - coordinates: 42°49′53″N 1°11′54″E
- Length: 19.6 km (12.2 mi)

Basin features
- Progression: Salat→ Garonne→ Gironde estuary→ Atlantic Ocean

The Alet is a river in southwestern France. The river is a right tributary of the Salat. The total length is 19.6 km (12.2 mi) from its source in the Ariège department in the Pyrenees to where it empties into the Salat, near Seix. The Alet is part of the Garonne basin.
